= Margarita Province =

Former province of the Spanish Empire

Coordinates: 11°02′N 63°51′W

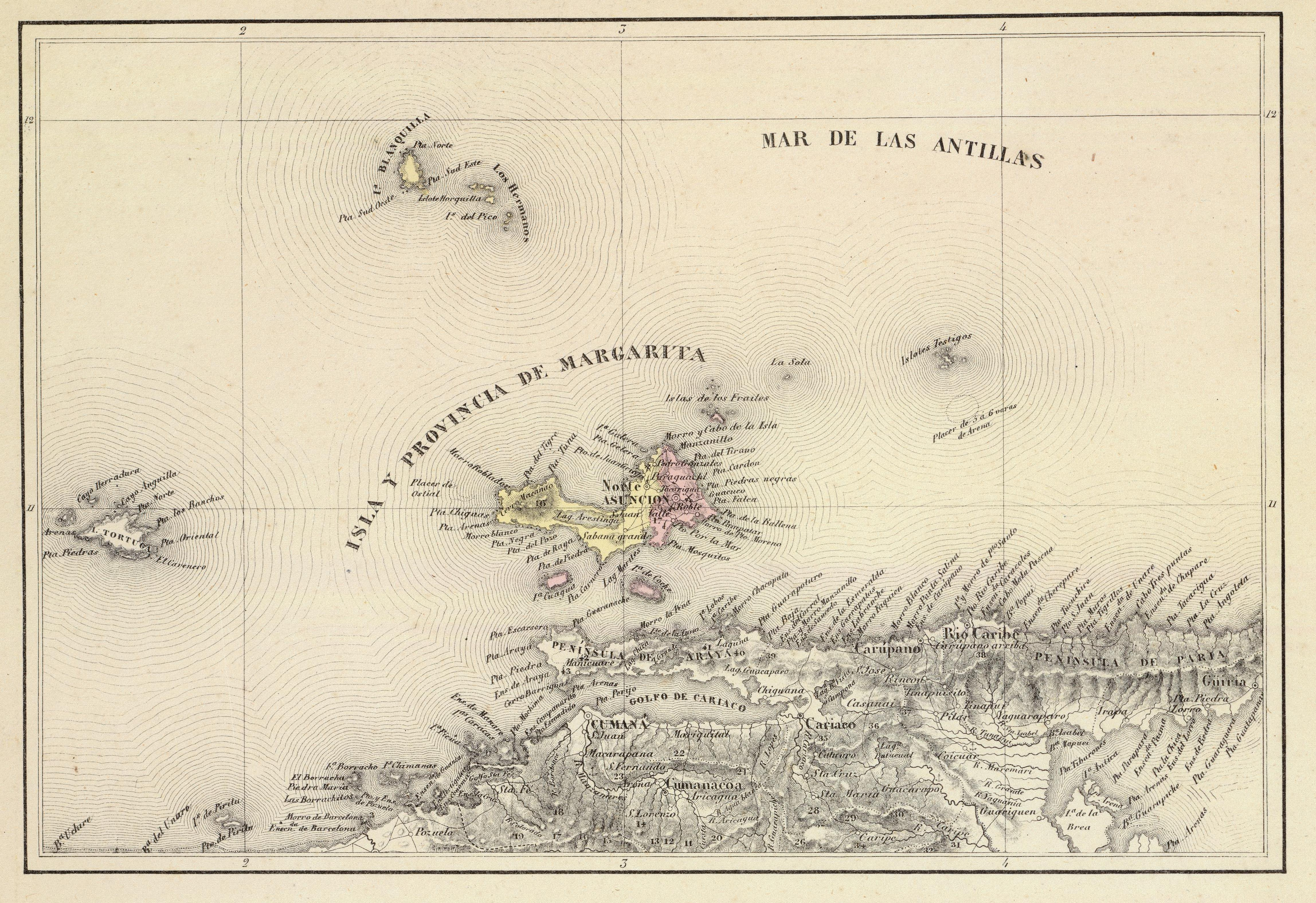
1840 map by Agostino Codazzi.

Province of Margarita was a province of the Spanish Empire created in 1510, being the first to be established within the territory of present-day Venezuela, covering the entire surface of Margarita Island and its adjacent islands.

== History ==
In 1498, the island was encountered by Christopher Columbus during his third voyage. Later, on 18 March 1525, Emperor Charles V erected the Province or Governorship of Margarita, granting it as property for two lifetimes to Marcelo Villalobos. When he died on 24 June 1526, he was succeeded by his daughter Aldonza Villalobos Manrique according to the royal capitulation of 13 June 1527, but since she was a minor, her mother Isabel Manrique assumed the government of the island.

Isabel Manrique took care of the settlement task by bringing groups of colonists to settle permanently, and since she could not handle all administrative tasks, she appointed Pedro de Villárdiga as lieutenant governor of Margarita.

Aldonza Villalobos Manrique married at the age of 16 and went on to govern the island for 33 years until her death in 1575. She had appointed her son-in-law Juan Sarmiento as interim governor, who that same year handed over the interim post to colonial governor Miguel Maza Lizana, who held it for six years. After three interim governors, the title of governor passed in 1583 to the great-grandson of the first island owner: Juan Sarmiento de Villandrando.

Columbus baptized the island with the name La Asunción, as it was discovered on the religious feast day of the Virgin of that name. The following year, in 1499, Pedro Alonso Niño and Cristóbal Guerra renamed it "La Margarita" due to the abundance of pearls found in the region; other hypotheses suggest that the name "Margarita" refers to Queen Margaret of Austria.

Margarita depended on the Royal Audiencia of Santo Domingo until 1739, when it was annexed to the Viceroyalty of New Granada, along with the other Venezuelan provinces, until 1777, when King Charles III created the Captaincy General of Venezuela. On 5 July 1811, the Act of Independence of Venezuela was signed, in which representatives from Margarita were among the seven of the ten provinces belonging to the Captaincy General of Venezuela that signed the declaration of independence from the Spanish Crown and promulgated the Republic of Venezuela. In 1819, Venezuela joined New Granada and Quito to form the Republic of Colombia. In 1830, Venezuela separated from Colombia, and with the emergence of the Republic of Venezuela, Margarita was one of its 13 original provinces. In 1864, when the country was divided into 20 states and a Federal District, Margarita took the name of State of Nueva Esparta.

Margarita Island launched its cry of independence on 4 May 1810, in a movement led by Juan Bautista Arismendi; that day Margarita joined the independence movement proclaimed in Caracas on 19 April of the same year. A year later, on 5 July 1811, the provinces of Barcelona, Barinas, Caracas, Cumaná, Margarita, Mérida, and Trujillo declared themselves free and independent and signed the Act of Independence, thus forming the First Republic of Venezuela. Later, the Guayana Province joined them.

== Territorial division ==
In 1835, the Province of Margarita was divided into the cantons of La Asunción (composed of the parishes of Paraguachí, Pampatar, Los Robles, El Valle, and Porlamar) and Norte (composed of the parishes of Tacarigua, Juangriego, San Juan, Pedro González, and Sabana Grande).

In 1856, the Province of Margarita was divided into the cantons of Norte (composed of the parishes of Norte, Juangriego, Tacarigua, Pedro González, Los Hatos, Pedregales, San Juan, and the islands of Tortuga, Blanquilla, Testigos, and Aves de Barlovento), with its capital in Santa Ana del Norte, and Sur (composed of the parishes of Asunción, Pampatar, Porlamar, Paraguachí, Espíritu Santo, Robles, and Sabana Grande), with its capital in La Asunción.

== Divisions ==
The Province was named for its most important part, Isla Margarita.

Capital: Asunción.

Cantons:

- Asunción Canton
- Norte Canton (seat: Santa Ana del Norte).

== Governors ==
A partial list of governors:

Term	Governor	Notes and sources
1595	Francisco Gutiérrez Flores	
1619-1626	Andrés Rodríguez Villegas	Governor and captain-general
1626-1630	Garcia Álvarez de Figueroa	
1630-1638	Juan de Eulate	Governor from 1630 to 1638 before retiring to Spain.
1638-1642	Juan Luis de Camarena	Governor from 18 February 1638 until 1642. Died in office.
1643-1649	Francisco de Santillán y Argote	Governor from 13 April 1643 to 23 March 1649.
	Fernando de Mendoza Mate de Luna	Followed Santillán y Argote
1668-1671	Martin de Tellerfa	
1671-1676	Francisco Mejía y Alarcón	Appointed governor of Margarita in January 1672.
1676-1681	Juan Muñoz Gadea	Appointed governor on 25 November 1676.
1681-1683	Juan Fermín de Huidobro	
1683-1685	Juan Muñoz Gadea	Second term
1686-1688	Martín Cabeza de Vaca	
1688-1690	Sancho de Zapata de Mendoza	
1692-1699	José Leoz y Echalaz	
1699-1706	Diego Suinaga y Orbea	Appointed governor in 1699
1713-1718	Diego Antonio de Molina Miñano	Nombrado Gobernador y Capitán General 23 August 1712, tomó posesión ele 11 October 1713. Cesó en enel cargo October 1718.
1718-1723	José Arias	Fue Gobernador y Capitán General del 26 Junio 1717 a 2 octubre 1723.
1724-	Juan de Vera y Fajardo	Nombrado Gobernador y Capitán General el 1 June 1724
1746-1750	José Longar y Cobián	
1750-1756	Joaquín Moreno de Mendoza	
1757-1764	Alonso de Rio y Castro	
1764-1776	José de Matos y Rabel	
1776-1785	Félix Francisco Bejarano	
1785-1792	Miguel González Dávila	
1793-1796	Juan de Dios Valdés de Yarza	
