= Luisa (film) =

- Directed by: Juan Carlos Wessolossky
- Written by: Juan Carlos Wessolossky
- Produced by: Juan Carlos Wessolossky
- Starring: Carlos Mata, Eliana Lopez
- Cinematography: Javier Martíntereso
- Music by: Luis Fernando Laya
- Production company: CNAC
- Distributed by: Vila Del Cine
- Release date: 2016
- Country: Venezuela
- Language: Spanish

Luisa is a Venezuelan historical film produced by Fundación Villa del Cine and the Centro Nacional Autónomo de Cinematografía (CNAC). It stars Carlos Mata, Juvel Vielma, Eliana López, José Ramón Barreto, Aileen Celeste, and Leandro Arvelo,

The film depicts the life of Luisa Cáceres de Arismendi, focusing on her role in the Venezuelan War of Independence, her imprisonment by the Spanish army in 1815, and her relationship with Juan Bautista Arismendi.

The film was directed by Juan Carlos Wessolossky and was released domestically in 2016. The film received negative reviews.

== Plot ==
Set in 1816 in Margarita Island, tell the story of a brave woman called Luisa Caceres De Arismendi.

== Cast ==
- Carlos Mata as Juan Bautista Arismendi
- Juvel Vielma as Palacios
- Eliana Lopez as Luisa Caceres De Arismendi
- Miguel Ferrari as Joaquin Urreizeta
- Leandro Arvelo as Felix Caceres, Luisa Younger brother
- Victor Cámara as Bianchi, pirate ally with Arismendi
- Jose Ramon Barreto
- Brenda Hanst
- Alejandro Mata as Domingo Caceres
- Carlos Clemares as Pablo Morillo
- Felix Loreto
- Walter Gamberini

== Production ==
The film was initially announced with a high-profile Latin American cast that included Bárbara Mori, Javier Cámara, Guy Ecker, and Adriana Barraza, among others. However, these international actors later withdrew due to budget limitations. The project was subsequently recast, with Eliana López and Juvel Vielma in leading roles.

The production was filmed primarily on the island of Margarita.
