= Francisco de Santillán y Argote =

Spanish soldier and colonial administrator

Governor of Margarita
- In office 13 April 1643 – 23 March 1649
- Preceded by: Juan Luis de Camarena
- Succeeded by: Fernando de Mendoza Mate de Luna

Francisco de Santillán y Argote was a Spanish soldier and colonial administrator who was governor of the Province of Margarita from 13 April 1643 to 23 March 1649. He was succeeded by Fernando de Mendoza Mate de Luna.

Captain Francisco de Santillán y Argote was appointed Governor of the Isla Margarita and dispatched to take up that post by an order of 12 May 1643. Don Juan Damián López de Haro was appointed Bishop of Puerto Rico in 1644, holding office until his death in 1648. He found that the churches were extremely poor. He considered that the church was not getting the proper share of tithes, and directed that they should be paid in the cathedral to avoid abuses. Santillan joined with Gregorio de Castellar y Mantilla, Governor and Captain-General of Cumaná, in opposing the decision, which they saw as a violation of the currently accepted property rights, and wanted to continue to collect tithes. Don Damian died in Margarita on 20 September 1648 after a ship carrying plague arrived from Puerto Rico. Two hundred other people died, according to Santillan's report to the court.

Francisco de Santillán y Argote was later made a Knight of the Order of Santiago.
