= Santa Rosa de la Eminencia castle =

Colonial castle on Margarita Island, Venezuela

- La Asunción, Nueva Esparta
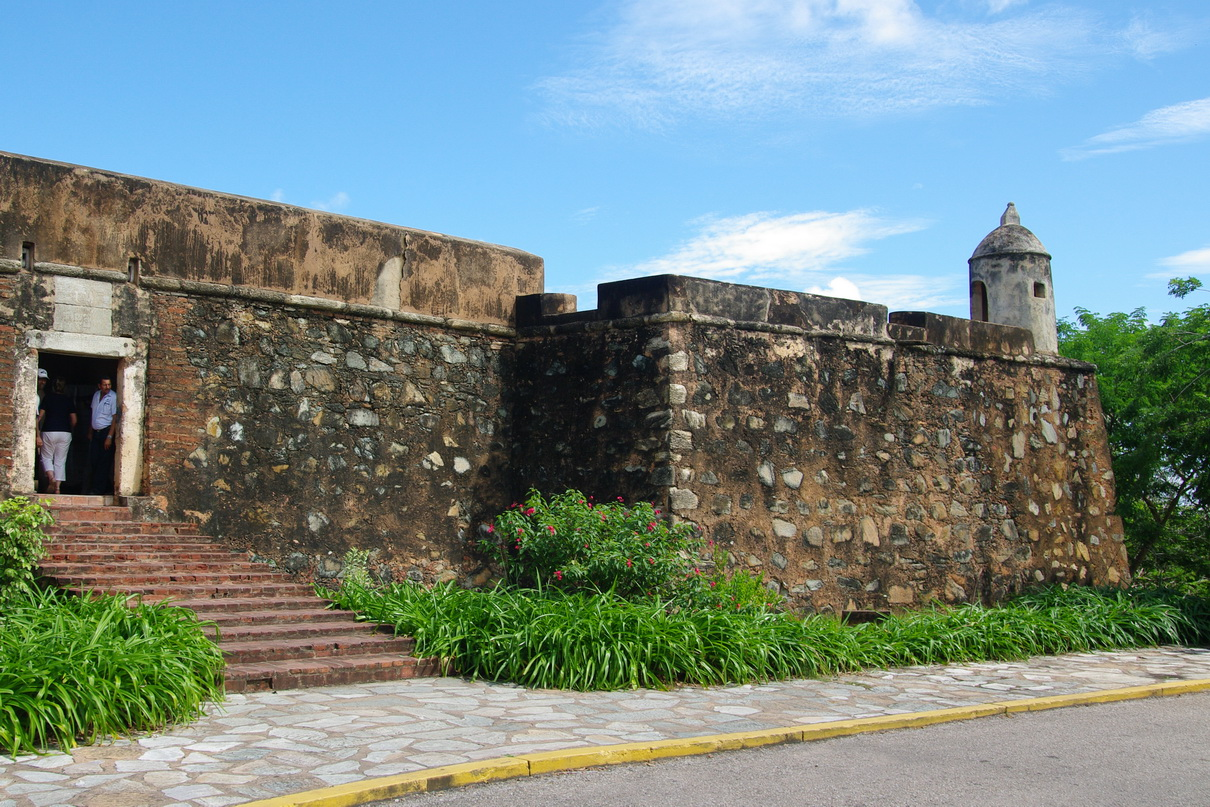
- Stonewalls protect the castle's core from the outer structures surrounding it.

Site information
- Type: Fortress
- Controlled by: State government
- Open to the public: yes

Location
- Coordinates: 11.0268767°N 63.8672699°W

Site history
- Built: c. 1682
- Built by: Juan Fermín de Huidobro

Santa Rosa de la Eminencia castle is a colonial castle built in the seventeenth century by the Spanish monarchy on Margarita Island, Venezuela. After a group of French pirates attacked the city of La Asunción, its construction started on 24 March 1677, by order of governor Juan Muñoz de Gadea, and it was finished c. 1683.

The structure comprises three defensive fronts, each one with two bastions, two half bastions and three curtains, and is positioned at the top of a hill that overlooks the city The castle served as a prison for war heroine Luisa Cáceres de Arismendi between November 1815 and January 1816. She was held captive by the Spanish forces on an attempt to bow down her husband, Juan Bautista Arismendi, who was the chief of the patriotic forces on the island. Simón Bolívar's arrival to the island prompted the partial destruction and abandonment of the fort in May 1816. By 1899, the facility serviced as headquarters, and later as quarters for the National Army. It was declared as a National Monument in 1965.

== Description ==
The Santa Rosa de la Eminencia castle was built on the site of the old San Bernardo fortress; its construction started on 24 March 1677 and finished c. 1683, under the command of governor Don Juan Fermín de Huidobro. Construction of the fortress began by order of governor Juan Muñoz de Gadea after a group of French pirates attacked the city in early 1677. The castle is positioned at the top of a hill that overlooks the city of La Asunción, and next to a reservoir. It comprises three defensive fronts, each one with two bastions, two half bastions and three curtains. The castle also includes barracks, a chapel, and a cistern, located at the parade along a curbstone and the ramp leading to the upper level. La Asunción was founded in 1562 by Pedro González Cervantes de Albornoz on the Santa Lucía valley, located at the eastern part of the Margarita island on the state of Nueva Esparta. The city was an important stronghold at the Venezuelan War of Independence.

== History ==
From November 1815 and until January 1816, Luisa Cáceres de Arismendi, a heroine of the Venezuelan War of Independence, was imprisoned in the castle. The Spaniards wanted to bow down her husband, Juan Bautista Arismendi, who was the chief of the patriotic forces on the island. After the patriots attempted an unsuccessful takeover of the fort in December 1815, Arismendi gave birth in January 1816 to a child that died at birth due to the terrible conditions of her confinement in the castle. Later in May 1816, Simón Bolívar's arrival to the island prompted the abandonment and partial destruction of the fort by the Spanish forces.

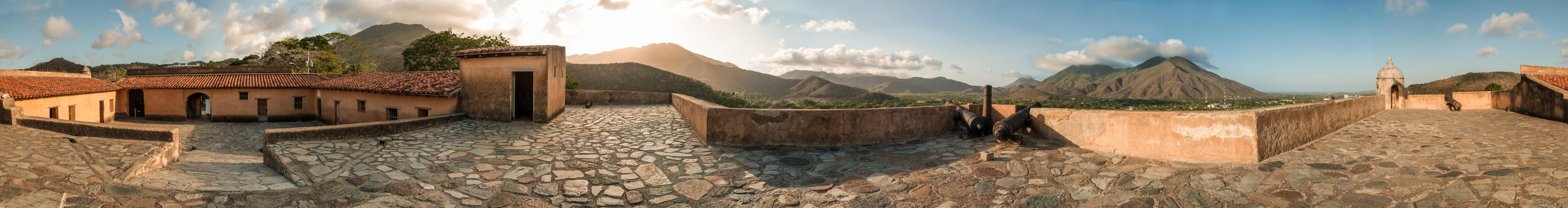
Panoramic 360°

Between 1818 and 1821, the structure was repaired and used as an artillery quarter during the War of Independence. It was later used as a magazine for the storage of gunpowder and ammunition in 1830; two years later, it functioned as barraks and armory. By 1899, the facility serviced as headquarters, and after receiving further repairs under instructions from the president Cipriano Castro in 1901, it served as quarters for the National Army. The sickness and eventual death of president Juan Vicente Gómez in 1935 led to the abandonment of the castle by the troops. Later in 1955, and due to a local initiative, the castle achieved the status of War Museum. It was declared as a National Monument in 1965 by president Raúl Leoni.
