= San Carlos de Borromeo Fortress =

- Pampatar, Isla Margarita
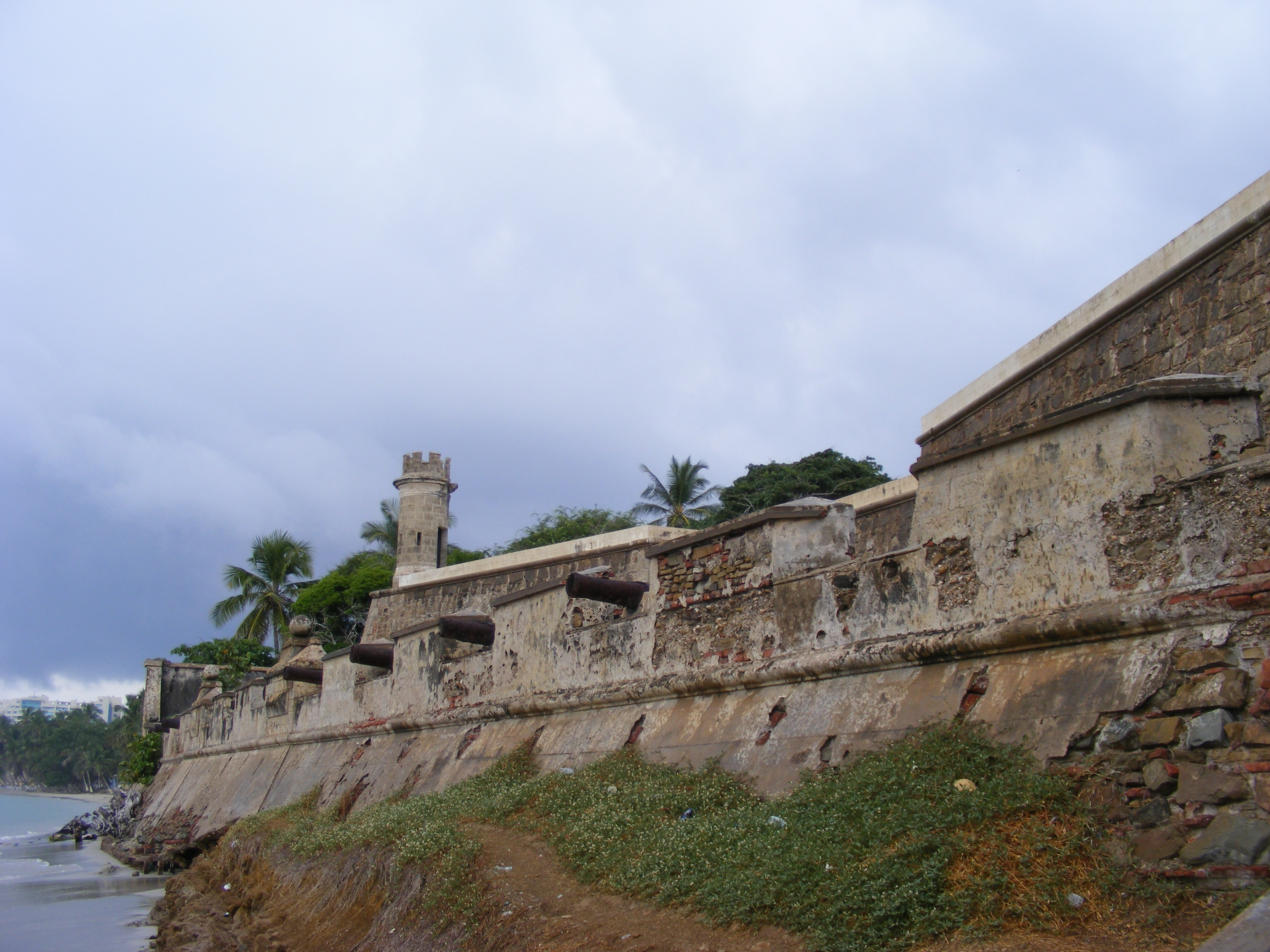
- San Carlos de Borromeo Fortress

Location
- Coordinates: 10.997513°N 63.798485°W

Site history
- Built: 1664 - 1684
- Built by: Juan Betín (design); Captain Carlos Navarro (construction)

San Carlos de Borromeo Fortress (Spanish: Castillo San Carlos de Borromeo) is a colonial fortress in the Bay of Pampatar in the northeast of Isla Margarita, Venezuela. It was completed in 1684 for protection against the constant threat of pirates. The fortress was ransacked several times before Venezuela gained independence from Spain. Today the castle has been restored and serves as a museum.

== History ==
Pampatar, or Port Royal Mampatare, was founded in 1536 on the shore of the best protected deep water anchorage on the island. The city was divided into two parts due to the irregular coastline. The original castle was built over a period of about 20 years, started in 1622. It was sited in the heart of the old city, looking out over the Bay of Pampatar. Its purpose, together with the La Caranta fort on the other side of the bay, was to protect the town from pirates with crossfire.

The fort was destroyed by Dutch pirates in 1662 when they burned Pampatar. In 1664 Captain Carlos Navarro began the reconstruction of the castle after a design by military engineer Juan Betín. In 1676 Juan Muñoz Gadea was appointed Governor of Margarita. When he reached the island in August 1677 he found that it had been devastated earlier in the year by a privateering raid by the French Marquis de Maintenon. Gadea focused all available resources, including some of his own funds, on completing and manning Fort San Carlos. The work was eventually completed in 1684. In subsequent years the castle was destroyed and rebuilt several times. La Caranta was destroyed by pirates in 1626. The ruins remain.

During the Venezuelan War of Independence the revolutionary Luisa Cáceres de Arismendi was held in the castle in 1816 while being moved from the Castillo de Santa Rosa in La Asunción to the prison in La Guaira on the mainland. She is considered the heroine of the war of independence, and her remains are now in the National Pantheon of Venezuela.

On 3 November 1816 the Spanish were forced to evacuate Isla Margarita. After boarding all the soldiers and supplies, they left a lighted fuse leading to a pile of gunpowder that would have destroyed the castle. A revolutionary soldier noticed the fuse by accident and extinguished it before any damage was done. The next year the Spanish under General Pablo Morillo returned to the island and made the fort their headquarters during a campaign to regain control. However, after six weeks in which the islanders reverted to guerrilla warfare the Spanish returned to the mainland.

== Structure ==
Layout of the fortress

The castle is a classical example of contemporary military architecture, typical of fortifications built along the coast of Venezuela during that period. The fort has thick stone walls. The square structure has four observation towers, one at each corner. The base is star-shaped. The coastal battery consisted of a dozen cannon pointing across the bay. There is a moat around the fort, but it was never practical to fill it with water.

== Today ==
San Carlos de Borromeo Castle has been renovated and is now a museum. Many of the fort's rooms were made into exhibition areas. The restoration was completed in 1968. The museum includes paintings of heroes of the War of Independence, and of events in the war. One commemorates the Battle of Matasiete, and is the most popular item in the collection. In this battle, fought on 31 July 1817, revolutionary forces under General Francisco Esteban Gómez defeated Spanish Royalist forces under the command of General Morillo outside La Asunción, a few miles to the northwest. There are also old weapons and a replica of Christopher Columbus's boat, the Santa María. The museum also has a collection of memorabilia of Luisa Caceres de Arismendi.

== Gallery ==
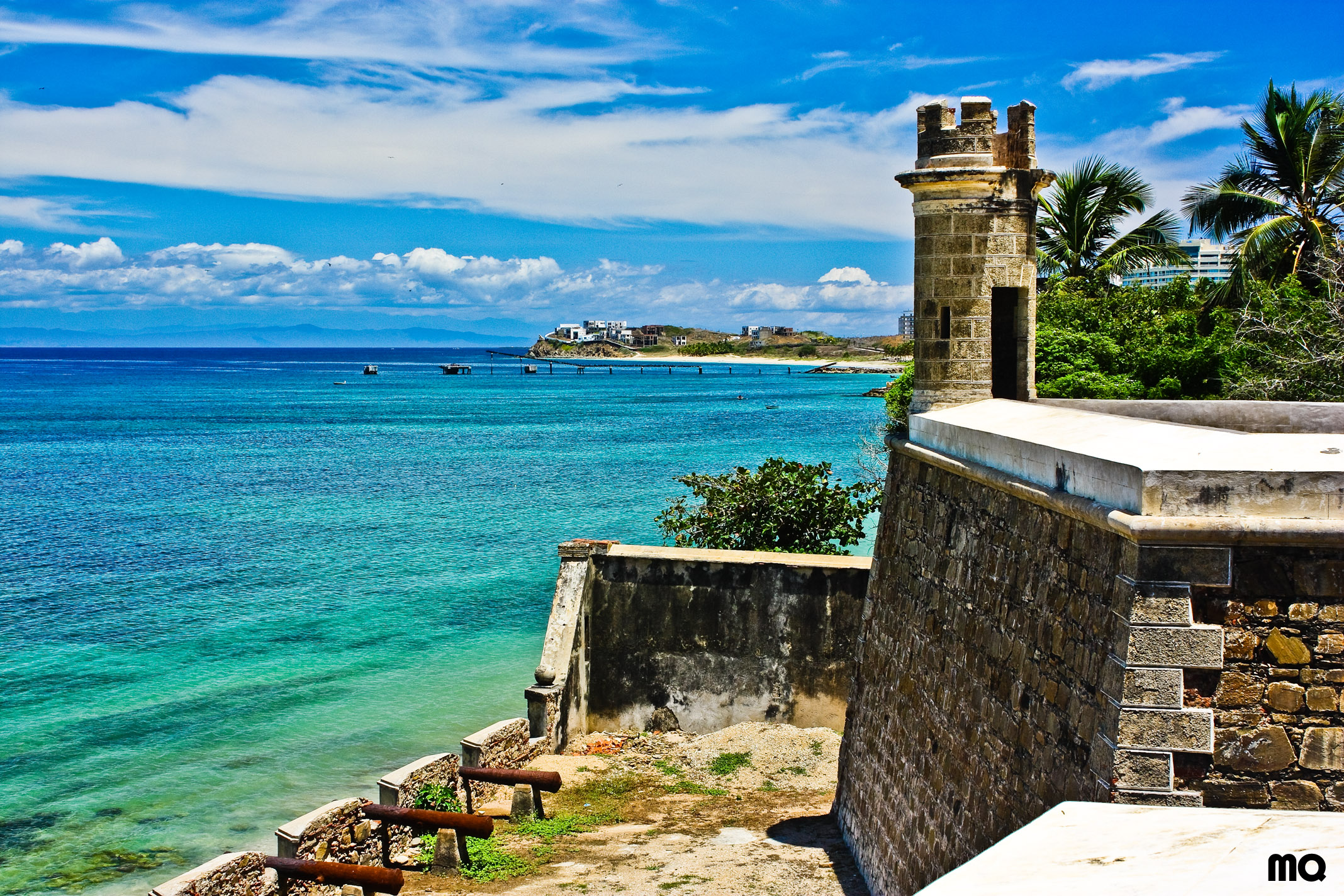
Tower

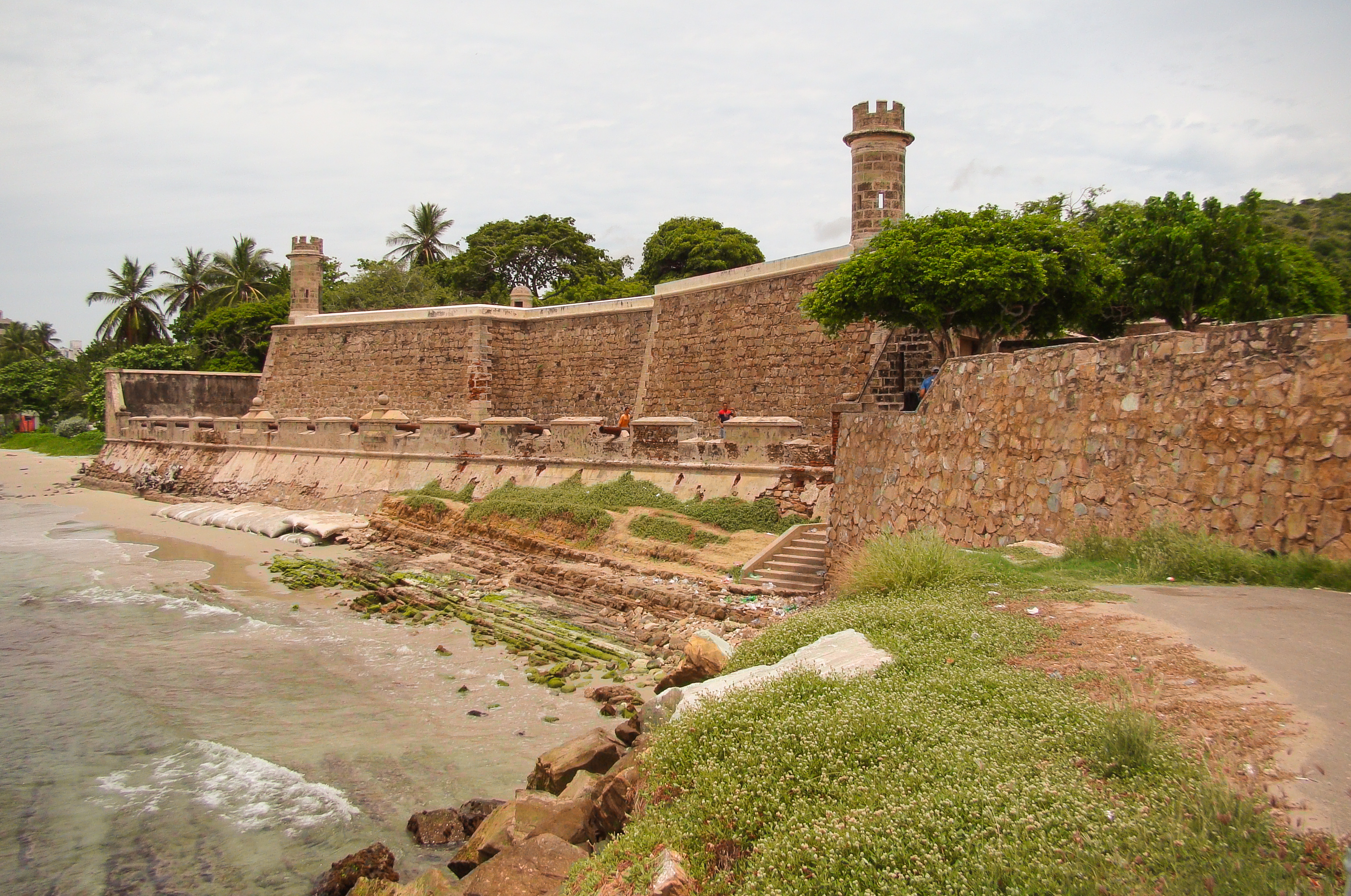
From the shore

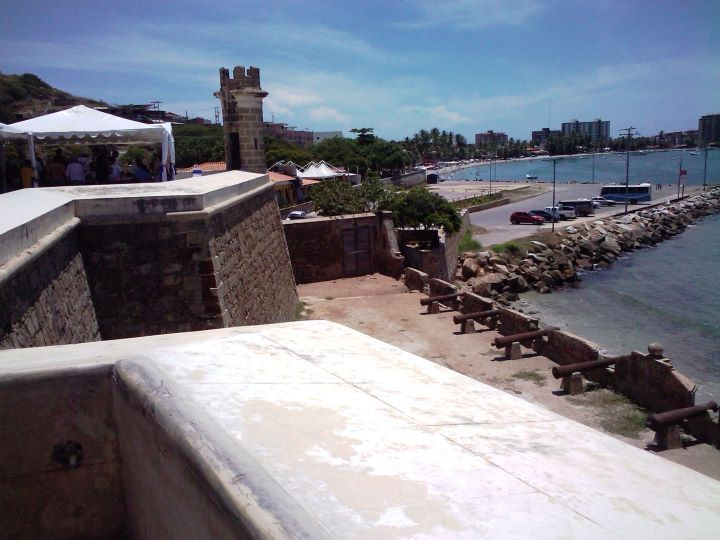
Defensive wall

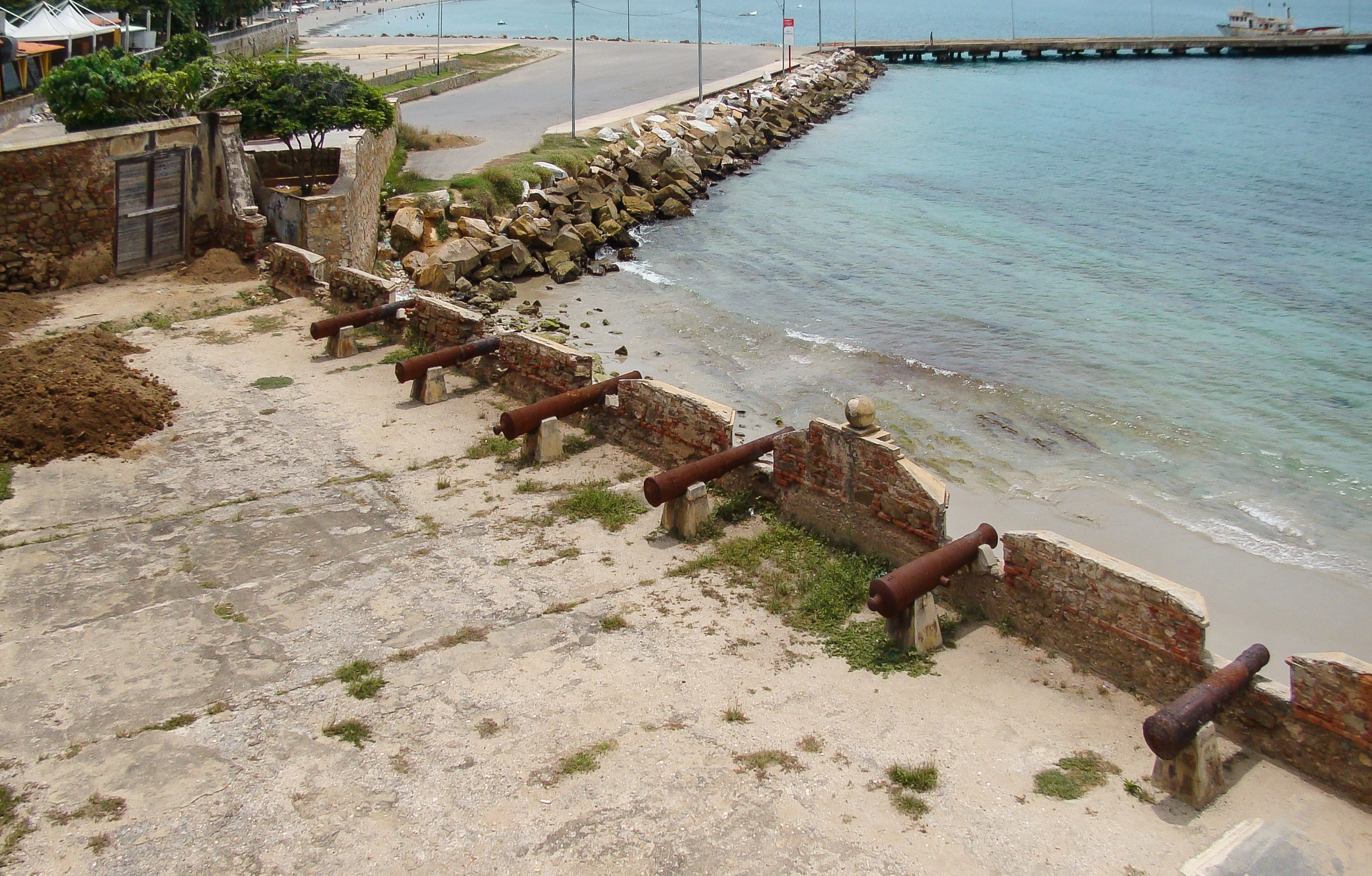
Cannons

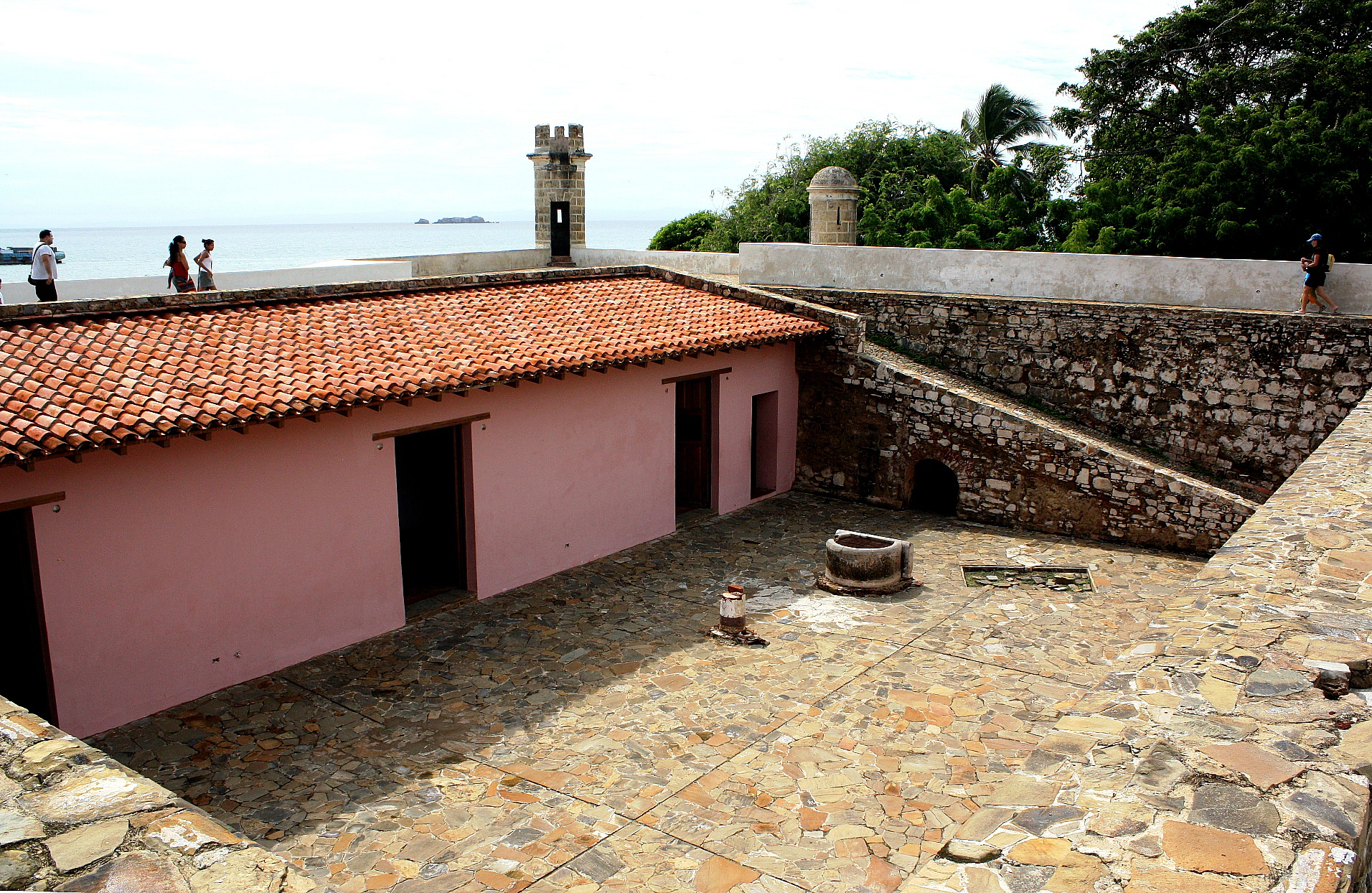
Interior building

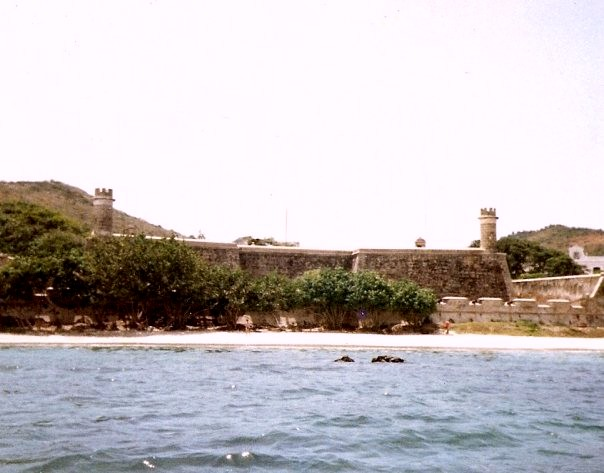
From the sea
