= Juan Luis de Camarena =

Spanish colonial governor

Governor of Margarita
- In office 18 February 1638 – 1642
- Preceded by: Juan de Eulate
- Succeeded by: Francisco de Santillán y Argote

Juan Luis de Camarena (d. 1642) was a Spanish soldier and colonial administrator who was governor of the Province of Margarita from 18 February 1638 until 1642. He died in office.

Camarena was a native of Seville. Capitán Juan Luis de Camarena was created sergeant-major of the military forces of Puerto Rico. On 18 February 1638 he was confirmed as Governor of the province on Margarita. The previous year, his predecessor, Juan de Eulate, had authorized the strangling of sixty Dutch and French prisoners taken at forts at Moruga near Punta de Galera, Trinidad, and in Tobago. The letter appointing Camarena governor, dated 23 December 1637, enjoined him to observe secrecy about the massacre.
