= Juan Fermín de Huidobro =

Juan Fermín de Huidobro Juan Fermín de Huidobro

Governor of Margarita
- In office 17 May 1681 – 19 September 1683
- Preceded by: Juan Muñoz Gadea
- Succeeded by: Juan Muñoz Gadea

Personal details
- Born: La Asunción, Isla Margarita
- Died: 1689 La Asunción, Isla Margarita
- Occupation: Military engineer

Juan Fermín de Huidobro (died 1689) was a Spanish military engineer who was Governor of Margarita Province, in what is now Venezuela, between 1681 and 1683.

== Early career ==
Juan Fermín de Huidobro was born in La Asunción, Isla Margarita, and joined the royal army at an early age. He was of criolla descent. In 1664 he was sent to serve in Trinidad, then in 1668 to New Granada. From there he was appointed to Guayana as lieutenant governor. He returned from Guayana to Margarita, holding various military positions and amassing considerable wealth.

Fermín was appointed maese de campo (military commander) of Margarita in 1677. Governor Juan Muñoz Gadea commissioned him to start construction of the Santa Rosa de la Eminencia castle in La Asunción, on the site of the old San Bernardo fortress. The two men fell out, and work stopped until 1680. Fermín visited Spain, and on 15 June 1680 was authorized to return to Margarita. That year the Council of the Indies ordered him to build a fort with four bastions and a watchtower in Puerto de la Mar, now Porlamar.

== Governor of Margarita ==
Muñoz Gadea antagonized the local people with his demands, including restrictions on trade, and a group led by Fermín arranged to suspend him from office. Muñoz remained on the island, but Fermín took over control. Fermín was appointed Governor of Margarita on 17 May 1681. As governor, Fermín inspected the defenses of the island and the coast of Cumaná. He suggested demolishing and relocating the tower of Porlamar, and demolishing the castle and the main church of Cumaná, as being cheaper than repairing them. He continued to work on the Santa Rosa castle, contributing some of his own money to the effort.

On 6 February 1683 Fermín reported the completion of the Castillo de Santa Rosa. He then asked for a transfer to another location. He was about to complete the tower at Porlamar when he was arrested on 19 September 1683 by Muñoz de Gadea, whom the Council of the Indies had restored as governor.

== Later career ==
Fermín appealed to the Real Audiencia of Santo Domingo. They sent judge Gregorio San Millán to the island, but Muñoz forced him to leave. A letter arrived from Spain on 28 March 1684 in which Muñoz Gadea was formally confirmed as governor. The Real Audiencia sent judge Fernando Araujo y Rivera to Margarita, who arrived on 5 July 1688 with a body of troops. Araujo arrested Muñoz and wanted to restore Fermín, but was opposed by the people of the island, who had many complaints with his behavior while in office. Araujo now started a trial of Fermín, who died the next year.
