= Juan Muñoz Gadea =

Governor of Margarita
- In office 25 November 1676 – 17 May 1681
- Preceded by: Francisco de Mejía y Alarcón
- Succeeded by: Juan Fermín de Huidobro

Governor of Margarita
- In office 19 September 1683 – 1685
- Preceded by: Juan Fermín de Huidobro
- Succeeded by: Martin Cabeza de Vaca

Personal details
- Born: November 12, 1634 Lima, Peru
- Occupation: Soldier

Juan Muñoz de Gadea (born 12 November 1634) was a Spanish soldier who served in Peru, Chile, Mexico and the Philippines. He was appointed Governor of Margarita in 1676.

== South America ==
Juan Muñoz de Gadea was born on 12 November 1634 in Lima, Peru. (Note: Captain Juan Munoz of the cavalry of the Philippines, born in Lima, aged forty, is reported as a resident of Cabastreros Street, Madrid.) On 7 January 1650 he enrolled in the army as a harquebusier in the seaport of Callao, Peru. In February 1654 he was in Chile, where he escorted a herd of over 1,000 horses from Maule to Concepción to relieve the garrison during a native revolt. For a period he was deputy Corregidor of Colchagua Corregimiento. On 19 February 1658 he won permission to leave Chile to pay a visit to Spain. He reached Havana, Cuba, too late to sail with the annual fleet. There he found his older brother, Nicolás Muñoz de Gadea in Havana, who was starting a term as Lieutenant Governor of Cuba.

== Mexico and the Caribbean ==
Muñoz Gadea sailed to New Spain, where on 7 January 1659 he was given a commission by the Viceroy Duque de Albuquerque to recruit and train a company of soldiers in Puebla. In September he was appointed Provost Marshal of all the newly formed companies that were gathering in Veracruz. On 14 December 1662 he was appointed second in command to an expedition led by Francisco de Leiva Issasi to carry troops to the Antilles. His ship with 100 troops was wrecked of the coast of Cuba, and they were marooned for a period on an offshore islet before being ferried to Havana. There they heard that the English pirate Christopher Myngs had sacked Campeche in February 1663, and were ordered to Campeche to assist in its defense. He reached Campeche by January 1664. On 15 October 1664 Muñoz Gadea was appointed sargento major and commander of the garrison of the city. In 1668 he resigned from this position.

== Philippines ==
Muñoz de Gadea travelled north to Mexico City. On the journey, pirates captured the ship that carried all his possessions. On 26 November 1668 the Viceroy Marqués de Mancera offered him the position of alcade mayor of La Antigua, Veracruz. Muñoz Gadea declined this offer and instead crossed the Pacific to the Philippines, where he obtained a position on the staff of the Governor in Manila. On 18 January 1672 he was given permission to return to Spain by way of Mexico, since his brother Nicolás had died and left him as heir. In the Caribbean, the Dutch ship he was sailing on was captured by the English and taken to Jamaica. He was held prisoner there, and then shipped to England, arriving destitute in London on 20 November 1673. The Spanish Ambassador to England let him accompany his party to Cadiz.

== Margarita ==
On 12 October 1674 Muñoz Gadea requested a new position in the Americas, and on 25 November 1676 he was appointed Governor of Margarita Province, off the coast of Venezuela. On 17 December 1676 he was told to travel to his new post on ships Buen Suceso and the Asunción, which were sailing independently of the fleet to Trinidad and Cumaná, and then on to Maracaibo. After some delays, he reached Isla Margarita at the end of August 1677. The island had been devastated earlier in the year by a raid by the Marquis de Maintenon at command of a fleet of 10 ships with 800 buccaneers. The former governor, Francisco de Mejía y Alarcón, had been helpless against the superior forces, who had guides familiar with the island. The privateers had looted and burned the buildings, then extorted whatever valuables the people had managed to take with them when they fled to the mountains as ransom for their prisoners.

It was clear to Muñoz Gadea that the defenses urgently needed improvement. He closed all ports apart from Pampatar and threw all resources, including some of his own funds, into improving the defenses of Pampatar's San Carlos de Borromeo Fortress. Muñoz Gadea quickly antagonized the local people with his demands, including restrictions on trade, and they arranged to suspend him from office. He remained on the island, but Juan Fermín de Huidobro took over control. Juan Fermín was a military engineer and a native of Isla Margarita to whom Muñoz Gadea had given the job of building the Castillo de Santa Rosa in La Asunción.

The population of Margarita had been reduced by the pirate raids, and the pearl fishery was abandoned. By a decree of 16 April 1680, all royal duties were suspended for four years. On 15 June 1680 Fermín was appointed maese de campo of Margarita. On 17 May 1681 he was appointed Governor. On 6 February 1683 Fermín reported the completion of the Castillo de Santa Rosa. Muñoz Gadea continued disputes and legal actions against Fermín, who eventually left the island. Muñoz Gadea was reappointed Governor on 19 September 1683 by the General Council of the Indies. Fermín appealed, but Muñoz Gadea was formally confirmed as governor on 28 March 1684. He left office in 1685, and in 1686 was replaced as governor by Martin Cabeza de Vaca.

In response to further complaints from Fermín, the Audiencia sent judge Fernando Araujo y Rivera to Margarita, who arrived on 5 July 1688 with a body of troops. Araujo arrested Muñoz and wanted to restore Fermín, but was opposed by the people of the island, who had many complaints with his behavior while in office.
