= Luisa Cáceres de Arismendi =

Venezuelan war heroine

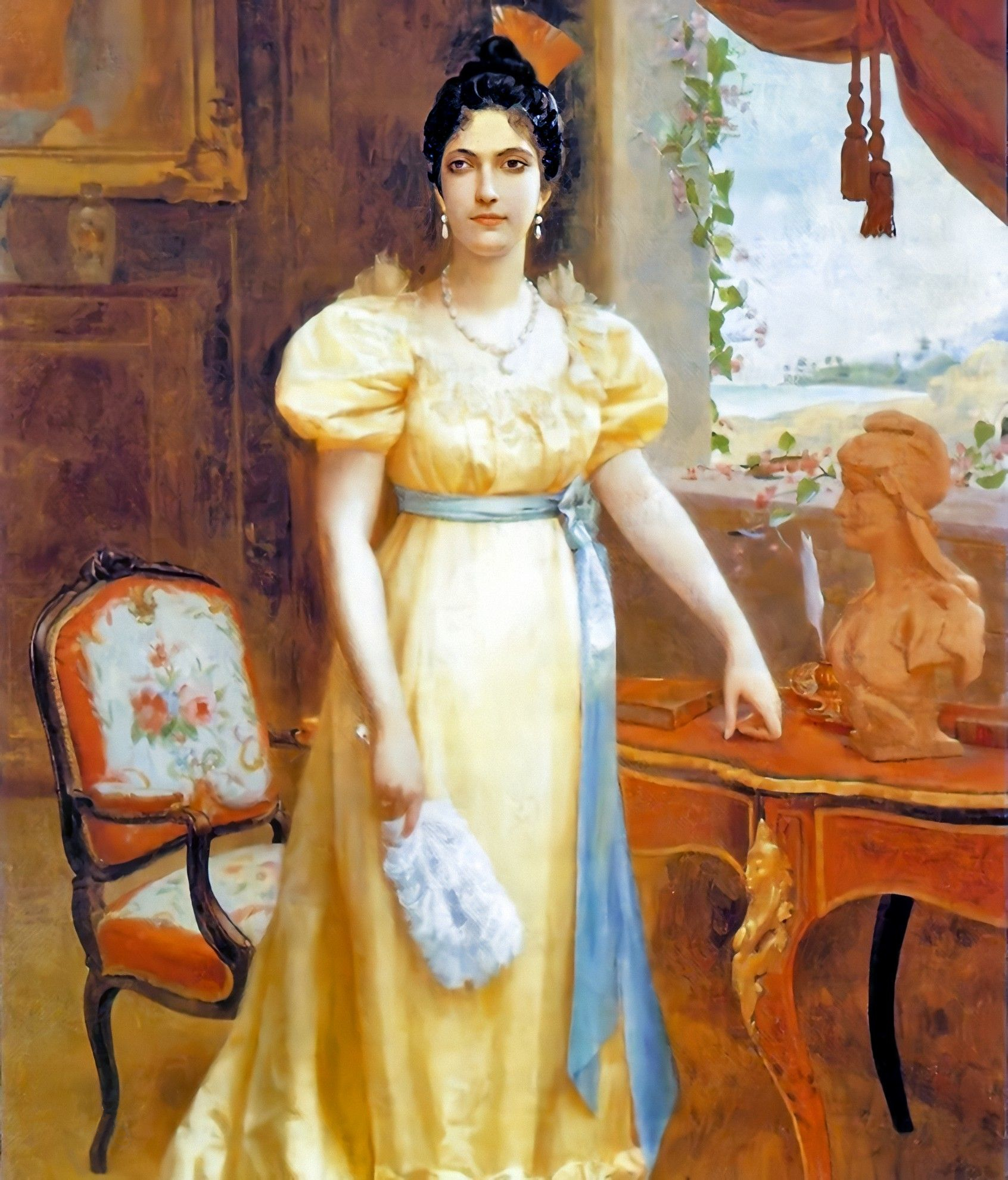
Posthumous portrait of Luisa Cáceres de Arismendi

Luisa Cáceres Díaz de Arismendi (September 25, 1799 – June 28, 1866) was a heroine of the Venezuelan War of Independence.

== Biography ==
Luisa Cáceres Díaz de Arismendi was born on September 25, 1799. Her father, Domingo Cáceres, and her brother Félix were assassinated by the Royalists in the town of Ocumare in 1814, and thus she participated in the 1814 Caracas Exodus and emigrated with the rest of her family to Isla Margarita. She married the general Juan Bautista Arismendi on December 4, 1814; they had met in Caracas, during Christmas of 1813.

In 1815 she was detained by the Spanish authorities with the purpose of pressing her husband Arismendi, who was by then battling a fierce campaign against the Royal Spanish forces. But the island's governor, Joaquín Urreiztieta, did not obtain anything from her and her husband which means that Luisa stayed imprisoned in Santa Rosa fortress, where she delivered a baby girl who died at childbirth. She was transferred to the Pampatar fortress, afterwards to La Guaira and finally she was sent to Spain (1816), where she was also victim of tortures to make her relinquish her republican ideals.

She was then taken to Cádiz; but on the way the ship she was on was attacked by privateer vessel, and she and other passengers were stranded on Santa Maria Island in the Azores. Luisa finally arrived at Cádiz on January 17, 1817. She was presented to the general captain of Andalusia. He protested against the arbitrary decision of the Spanish authorities in the Americas, and gave Luisa the category of being confined.

Nevertheless she never abandoned her independentist ideals. After being released, she returned to Venezuela on July 26, 1818, and continued to support the ideas of freedom and sovereignty of the people of the Americas. She lived in Caracas until her death on June 28, 1866. In recognition of her fight for Venezuelan independence, her remains were entombed in the Panteón Nacional in 1876.

Luisa Cáceres de Arismendi is pictured on the 20 Bolivar Fuerte (strong bolivar) note, introduced on January 1, 2008.

=== Family Tragedy ===
On 6 March, royalist troops under Francisco Rosete attacked the garrison at Ocumare de la Costa, killing Luisa's father, who was there at the invitation of General Juan José Toro.

The Military Command in Caracas, led by Colonel Juan Bautista Mendígar, organized an expedition of young students to support the patriots in Ocumare on 14 March. Among the soldiers was Félix Cáceres, Luisa's brother. Mendígar's forces were defeated, Félix was captured, and he was executed on 16 March.

The successive defeats and the offensive of José Tomás Boves and his “Infernal Legion” forced the patriot forces to abandon Caracas. On 7 July 1814, the retreat to the east was undertaken, commanded by Simón Bolívar and José Félix Ribas, in what is known in Venezuelan history as the Emigración a Oriente. The Cáceres family joined the emigrants, losing four relatives during the journey, leaving only Luisa, her mother, and a younger brother. They passed through Barcelona and reached Cumaná at the end of August, but the city soon fell to Boves.

Many emigrants fled to Margarita Island, where Colonel Juan Bautista Arismendi provided them shelter and resources. Having known the Cáceres family in Caracas during Christmas 1813, Arismendi offered them clothing, lodging, and assistance. On 4 December 1814, Luisa Cáceres married Colonel Arismendi.

=== Imprisonment on Margarita Island ===
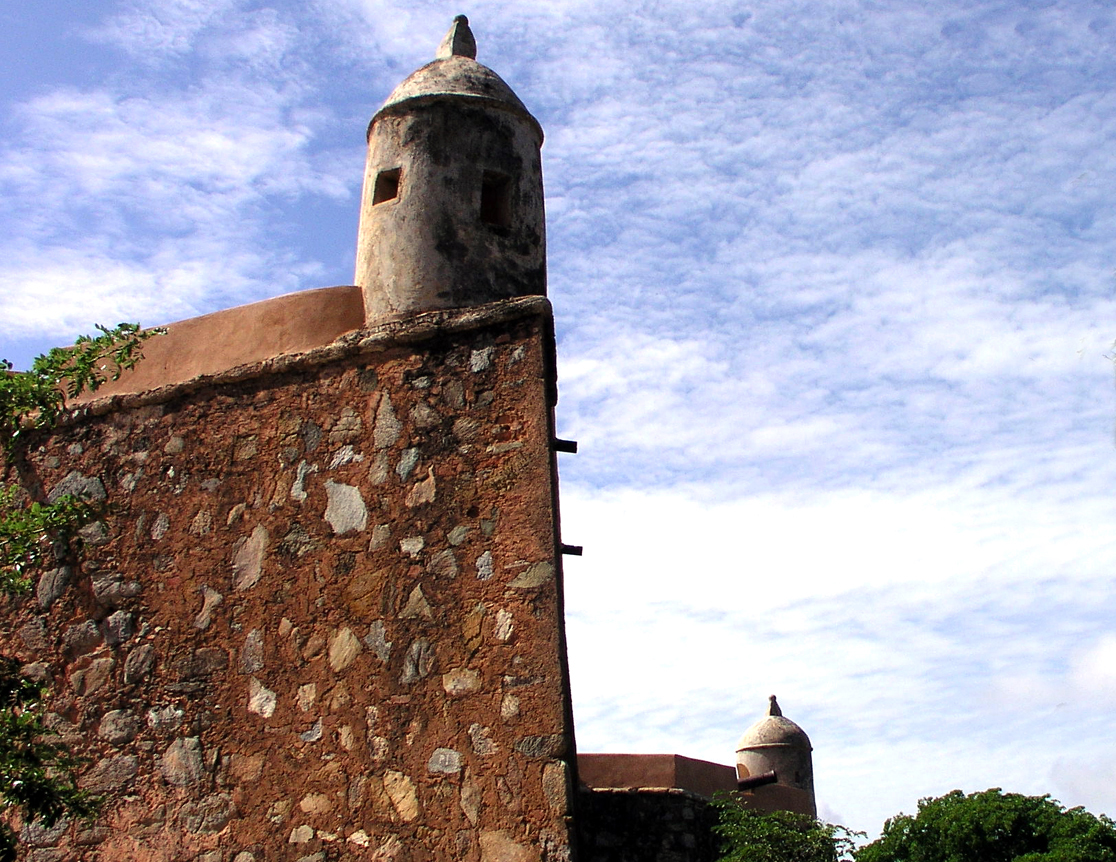
Castillo Santa Rosa de la Eminencia, La Asunción.

By 9 April 1815, Arismendi was acting governor when General Pablo Morillo arrived at Margarita Island with an unprecedented royalist fleet. Arismendi surrendered without combat, and Morillo decreed a general amnesty.

In September 1815, orders were issued to arrest Arismendi. He escaped and hid in the mountains of Copey with one of his sons. On 24 September, Luisa—pregnant at the time—was taken hostage to force her husband's surrender and imprisoned under guard in the Anés family home. Days later, she was transferred to a cell in Castillo Santa Rosa, a dark, windowless dungeon where she suffered torture and humiliation. She was constantly watched and forced to eat the soldiers' rations.

Arismendi captured several Spanish officers, including Commander Cobián of Santa Rosa. Royalist commander Joaquín Urreiztieta offered to exchange the prisoners for Luisa's freedom, but Arismendi famously replied: “Tell the Spanish commander that without a homeland, I do not want a wife.”

Her captivity worsened after a failed patriot assault on the fortress. She was forced to walk past the bodies of executed patriots and drink water contaminated with their blood. On 26 January 1816, she gave birth to a daughter who died at birth due to the deplorable conditions of the cell.

=== Transfer to La Guaira Prison ===
Brigadiers Juan Bautista Pardo and Salvador Moxó ordered her transfer to the Castillo San Carlos de Borromeo in Pampatar, where she remained for several days before being sent to the prison of La Guaira and later to the Convent of the Immaculate Conception in Caracas, entering as a prisoner on 22 March 1816. She remained isolated, without news of her family. After republican victories under Arismendi in Margarita and José Antonio Páez in Apure, Moxó ordered Luisa to be sent to Cádiz. She was returned to La Guaira prison on 24 November 1816 and embarked on 3 December. The ship was attacked by a privateer, and the passengers were abandoned on Santa Maria Island in the Azores.

=== Stay in Cádiz ===
Luisa arrived in Cádiz on 18 January 1817 and was placed under the protection of physician José María Morón and his wife, Concepción Pepet, after they posted bail and guaranteed her monthly appearances before a magistrate. She refused to sign a document renouncing her husband's patriot cause, stating that his duty was to serve the fatherland and fight for its freedom.

In March 1818, Lieutenant Francisco Carabaño and the Englishman Mr. Tottem arranged her escape. She boarded a U.S. frigate bound for America after bidding farewell to the Morón family.

=== Arrival in Philadelphia ===
On 3 May 1818, Luisa arrived in Philadelphia, where she was welcomed by relatives of patriot admiral Lino de Clemente, who supported her. Colonel Luis Rieux, Arismendi’s envoy, arranged her return to Margarita, where she landed on 26 July 1818. On 19 September 1819, the Consejo de Indias formally granted her full liberty and the right to settle wherever she wished.

She lived in Caracas until her death on 2 June 1866, after witnessing the new Venezuelan flag flying.

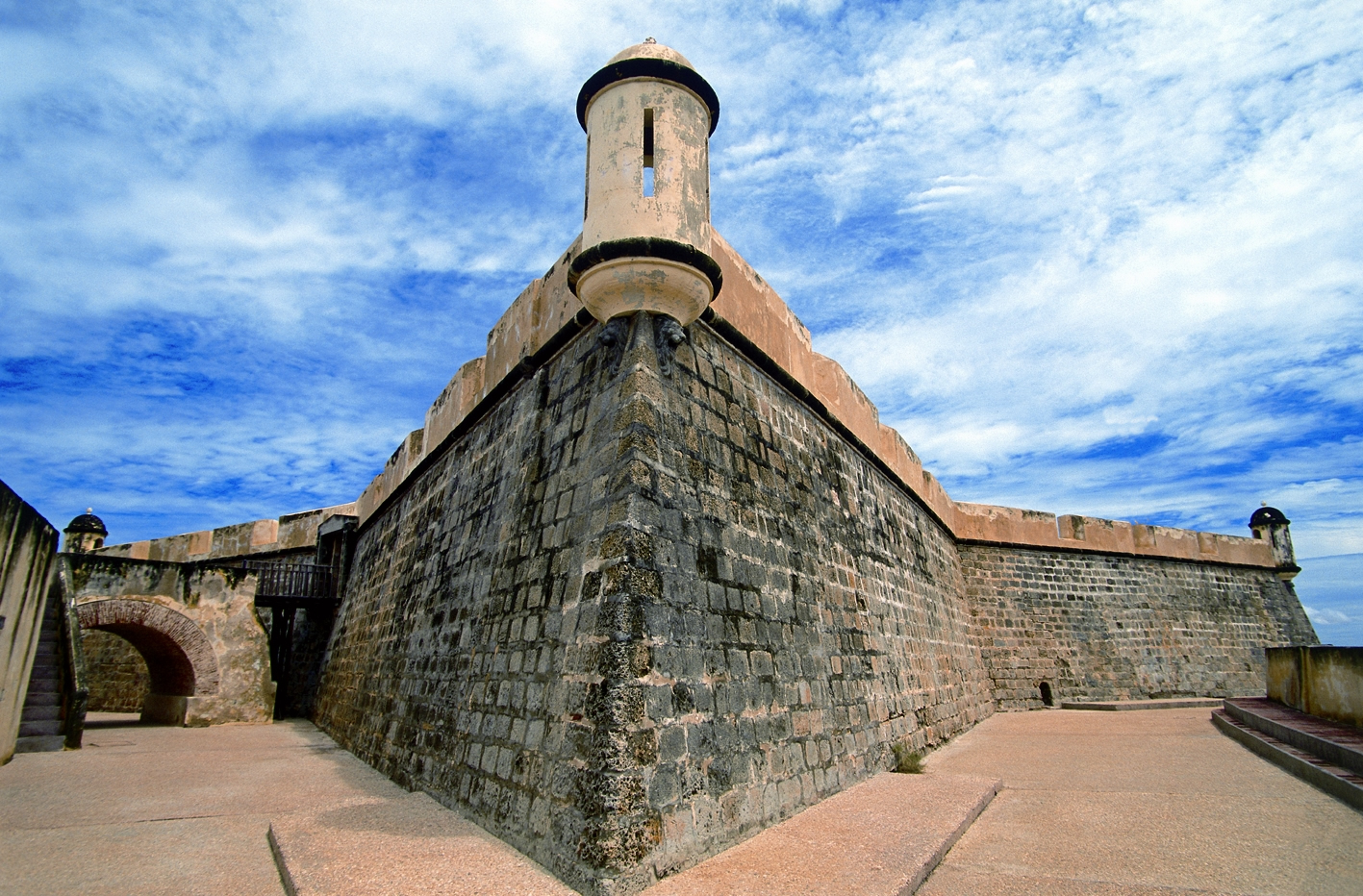
San Carlos de Borromeo Castle

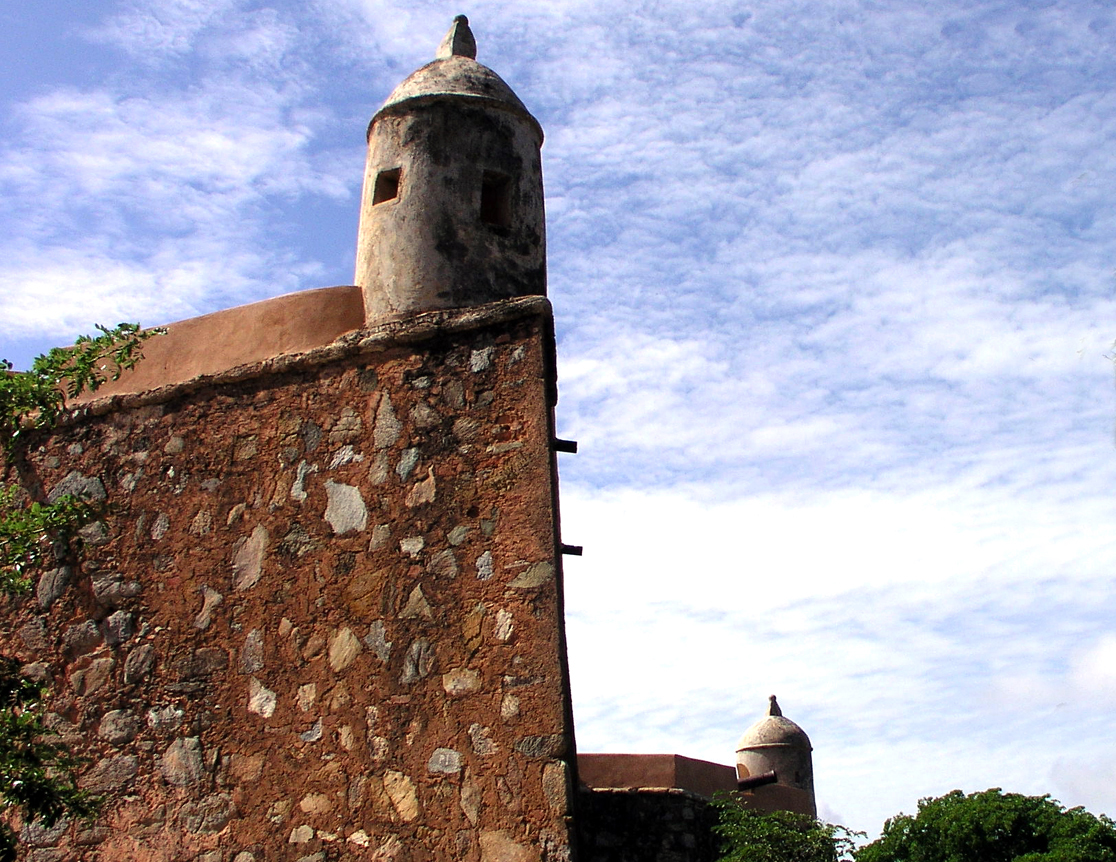
Castillo de Santa Rosa

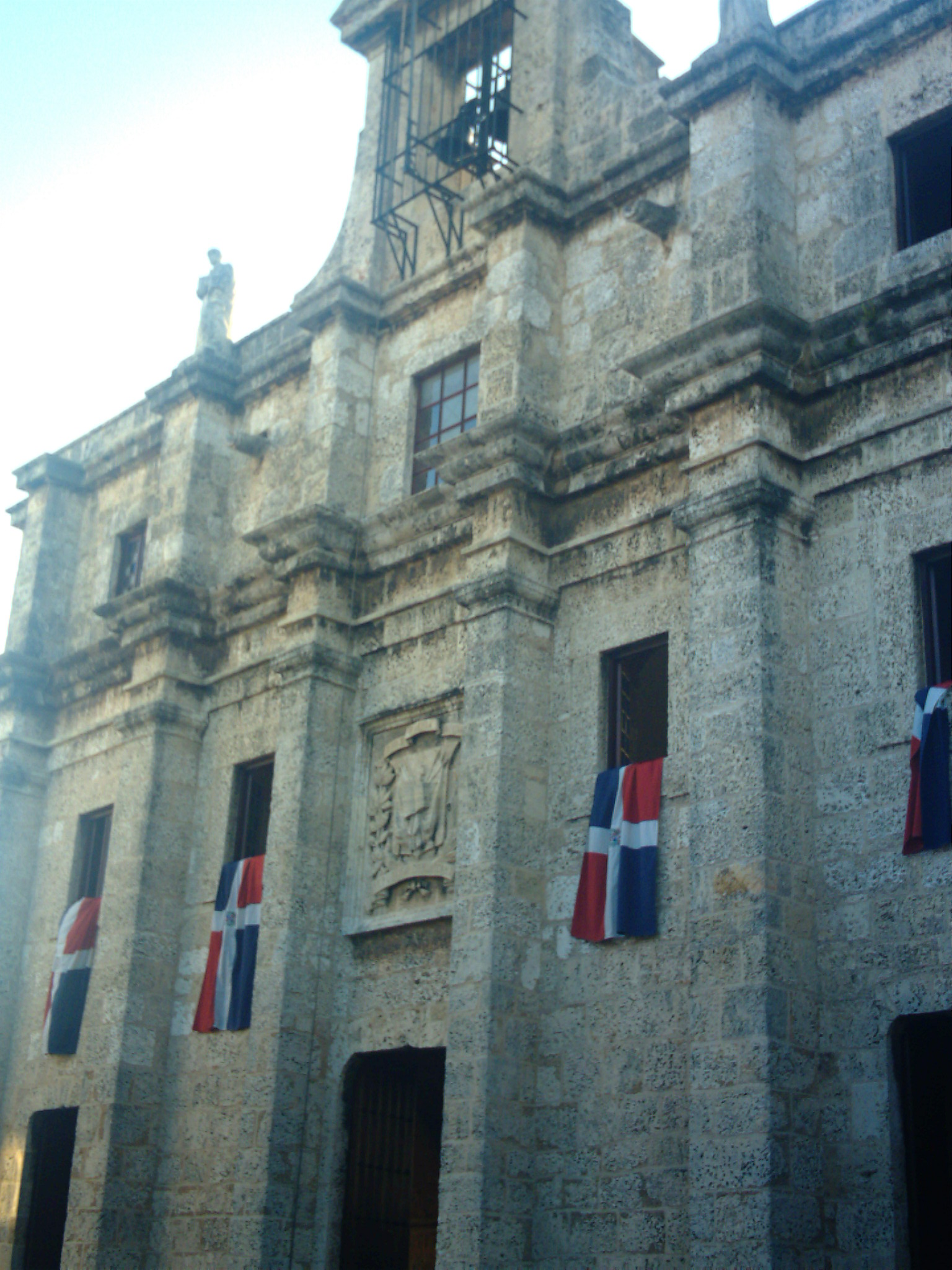
Panteón Nacional

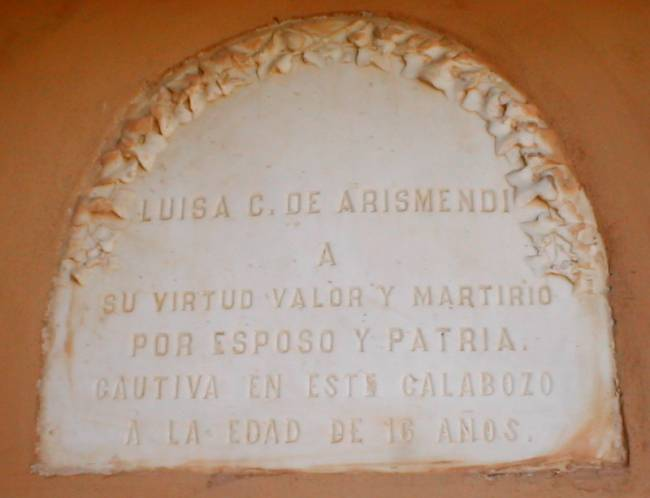
The plaque at Santa Rosa, which commemorates where Luisa was held and gave birth to a girl. The plaque translated into English reads: "Luisa C de Arismendi for her virtue, valour and martyrdom for husband and country. Held captive in this jail at sixteen years old."

== See also ==
- Venezuela
- History of Venezuela
