= Arismendi Municipality, Nueva Esparta =

Arismendi Municipality Municipio Arismendi
- Municipality
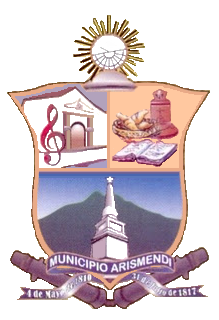
- Coat of arms

- Location in Nueva Esparta

- Location in Venezuela
- Coordinates: 11°01′55″N 63°50′59″W
- Country: Venezuela
- State: Nueva Esparta
- Municipal seat: La Asunción

Area
  - Total: 51.0 km^{2} (19.7 sq mi)
- Time zone: UTC−4 (VET)

Arismendi (Spanish: Municipio Arismendi) is a municipality of Isla Margarita in the state of Nueva Esparta, Venezuela. The capital is La Asunción.
