= La Asunción =

City in Venezuela

- City
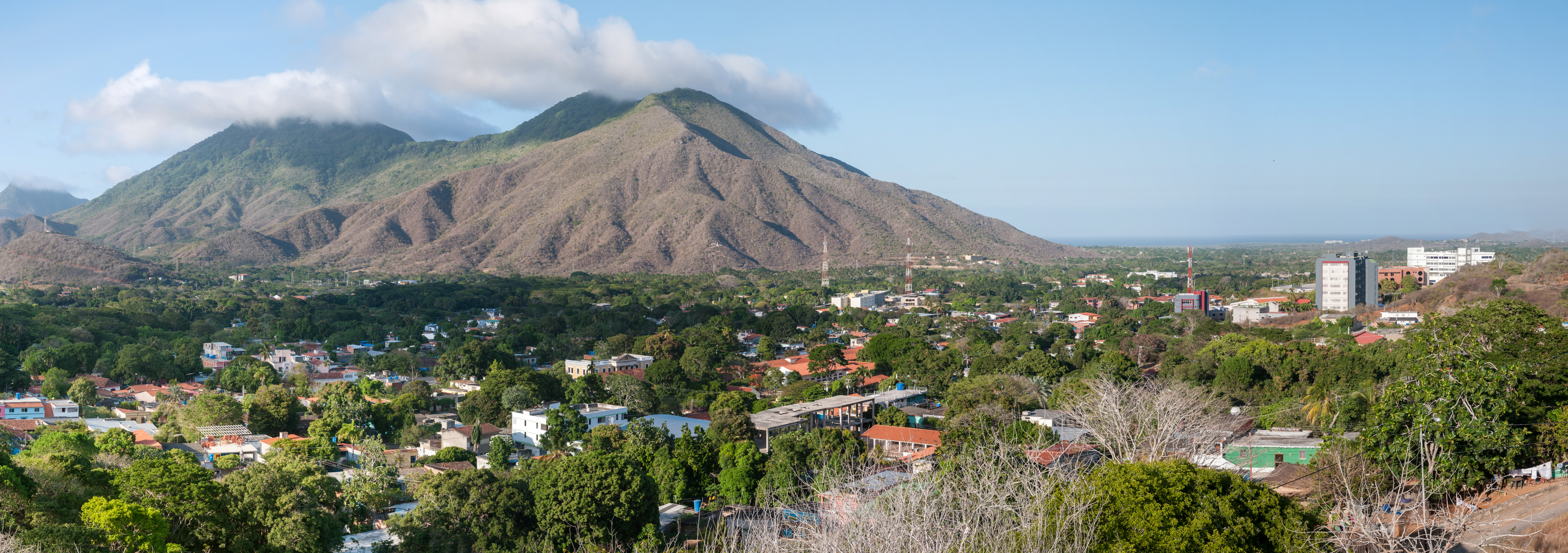
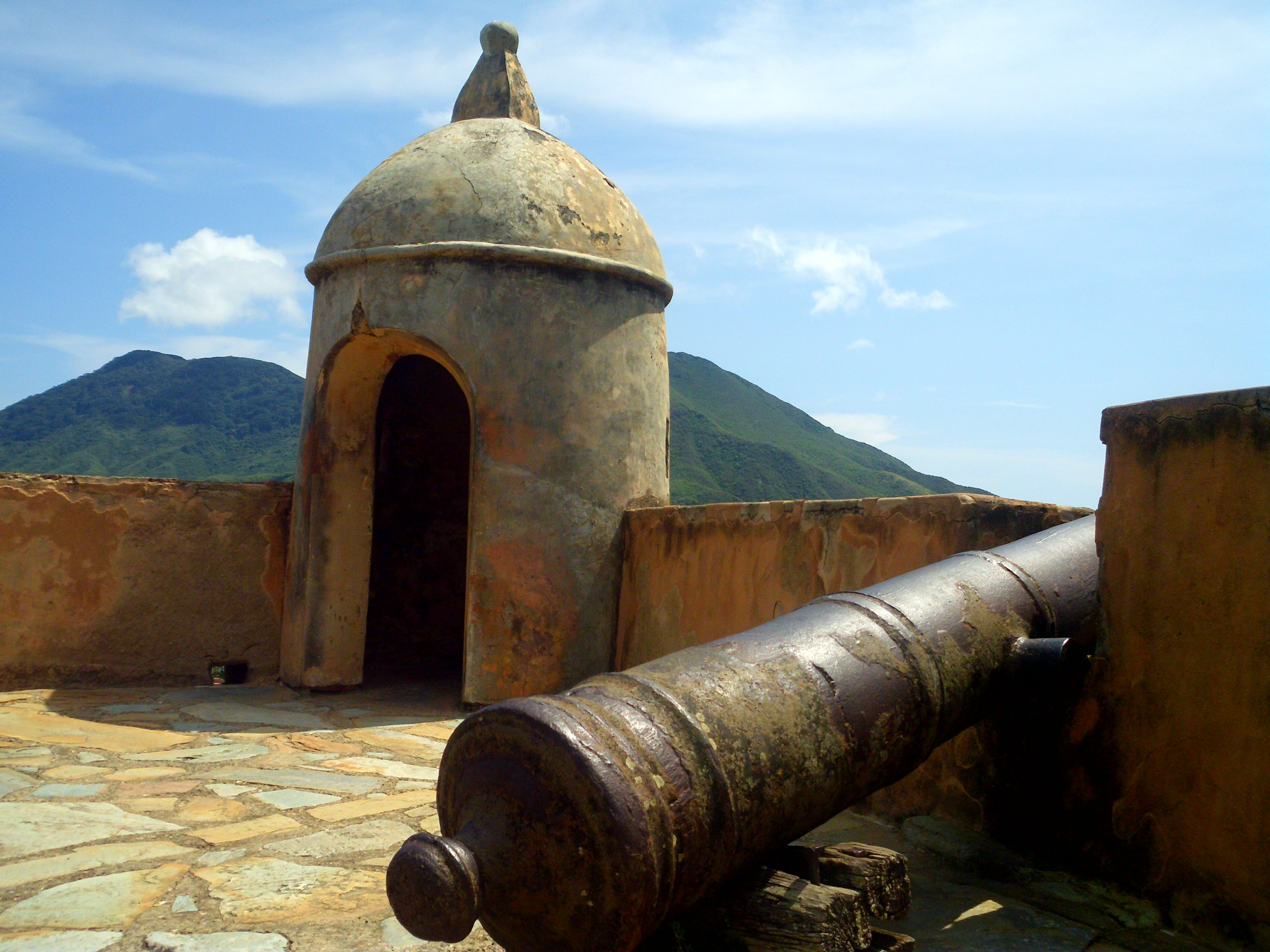
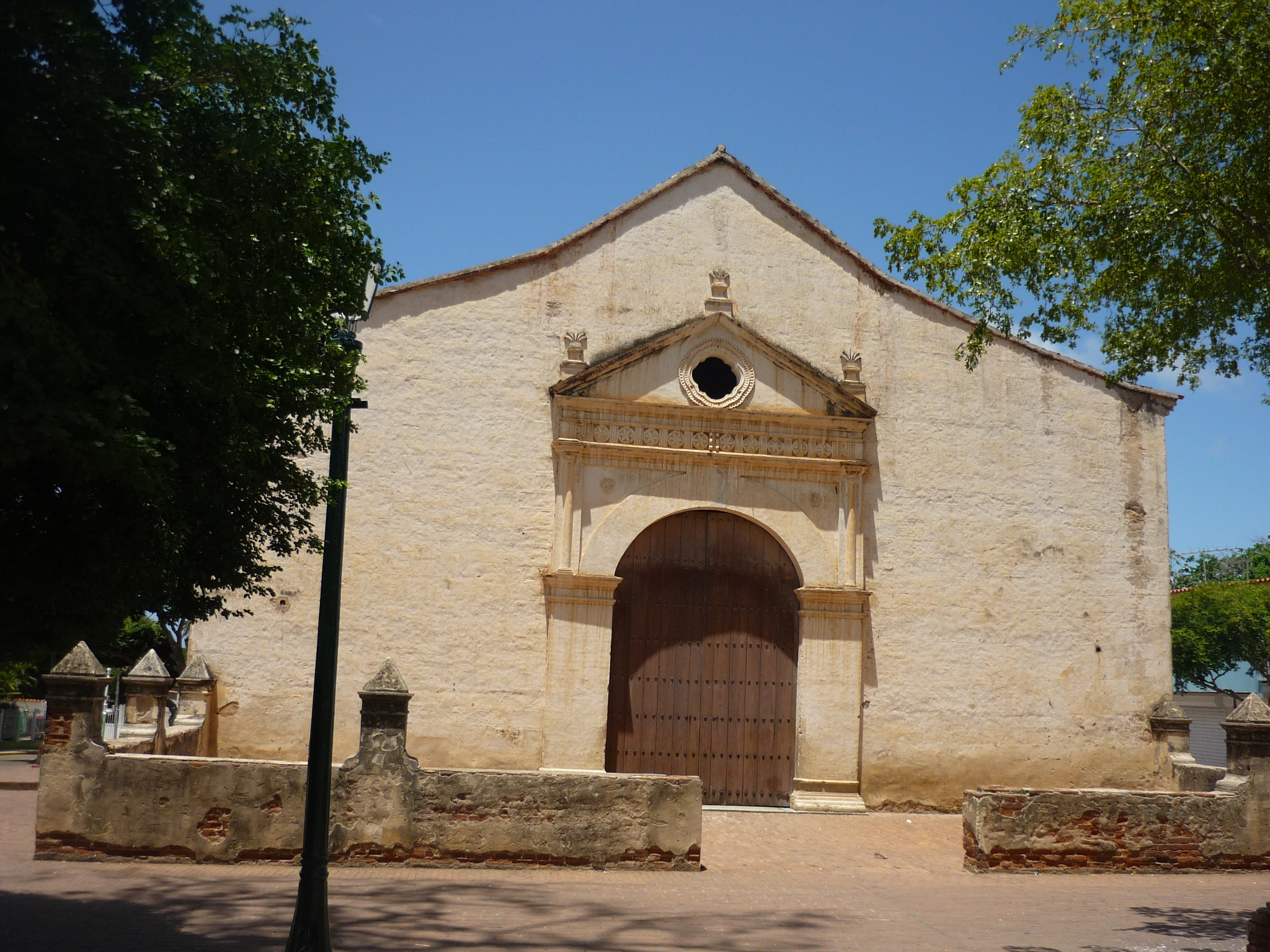
- Panoramic, Castle of Santa Rosa and House of La Asunción.

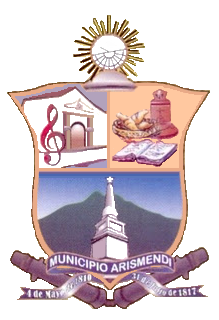
- Coat of arms

- Location within Venezuela
- Coordinates: 11°02′00″N 63°51′46″W
- Country: Venezuela
- State: Nueva Esparta
- Municipality: Arismendi Municipality
- Elevation: 42 m (138 ft)

Population (2011)
  - Total: 28,513
- Time zone: UTC−4 (VET)
- Area code: 0295
- Demonym: Asuntino/a
- Climate: BSh

La Asunción (Spanish pronunciation: [la asunˈsjon]) is a city in Venezuela. The capital of Nueva Esparta state (made up of three islands), it lies on Margarita Island in the Caribbean Sea, off the South American mainland. It is situated in a fertile valley surrounded by green hills, 6 miles (10 km) inland from the port of Porlamar, where a cooler climate exists. The city was founded in 1565 by Captain Pedro González Cervantes de Albornoz. It has an imposing backdrop of Santa Rosa Castle, also known as the Santa Rosa Fort, which was built to protect the city. The most important structures in the city are built around the Plaza Bolívar. The Catedral Nuestra Señora de La Asunción, dated to the 16th century, is one of the earliest churches in the country. According to the 2011 census, it has a population of 28,513 people.

== History ==
In 1562, the Spanish villagers of Espíritu Santo migrated to this hamlet to escape the marauding pirates and the tyrant Lope de Aguirre. In 1566 French pirates headed by Jean Bontemps completely razed the village which was further devastated by the English privateer John Hawkins. However, the town was refounded, given a coat of arms, and called a city.

La Asunción thus was founded in 1565, by Captain Pedro González Cervantes de Albornoz. Construction of the Santa Rosa de la Eminencia castle on a hill overlooking the city began on the orders of the governor, Juan Muñoz de Gadea, after the French buccaneer Marquis de Maintenon attacked the city in early 1676. The work was started on 24 March 1677 and finished c. 1683, under the command of the field master Don Juan Fermin. La Asunción was involved in the Venezuelan War of Independence, and noted General Juan Bautista Arismendi married his wife Luisa Cáceres de Arismendi on December 4, 1814, in the city at the age of 39. The castle was abandoned in 1935, but twenty years later achieved the status of a War Museum due to a local initiative. It was declared a National Monument in 1965 by president Raúl Leoni.

== Geography ==
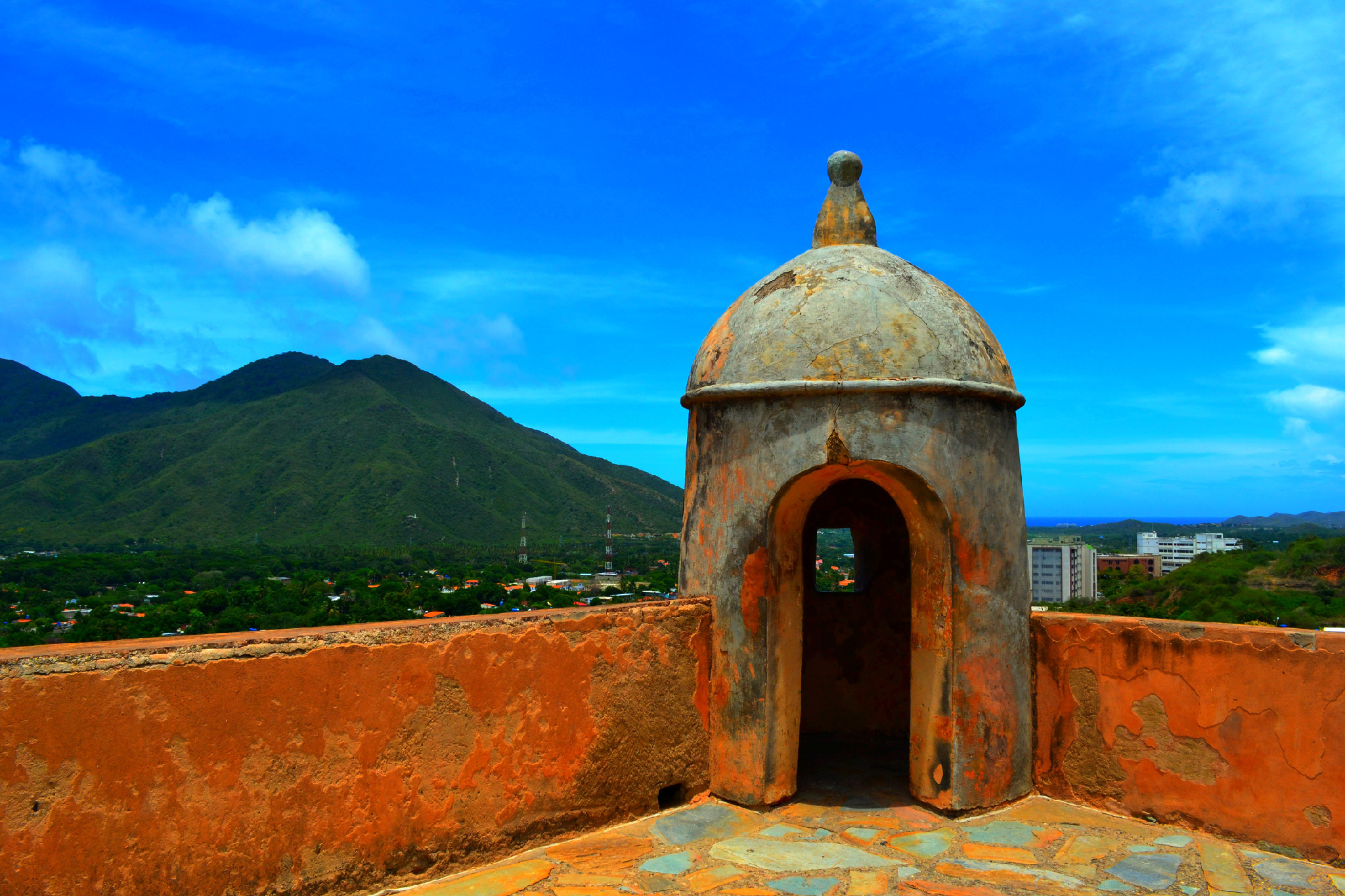
Santa Rosa de la Eminencia castle

Surrounded by green hills, La Asunción is situated in the Santa Lucia Valley in the center of eastern Margarita Island. Porlamar is 6 miles (9.7 km) to the south. At the time of its founding this was a secluded location which provided some protection from coastal pirates. The fertile Santa Lucia Valley is nurtured by the Cerro El Copey which rises in the mountains here. A bridge across the Río Asunción was built in 1609, which existed until 1970 and provided entry to the town from the north.

== Demographics ==
La Asunción, part of the state of Nueva Esparta, had a population of 10,375 in 1981. As of 30 October 2010, the population stood at 28,309. The corresponding figures for the state as whole are 263,748 and 491,610, respectively.

== Government ==
It is the seat of the regional government and the municipality of Arismendi Municipality, Nueva Esparta.

== Cityscape ==
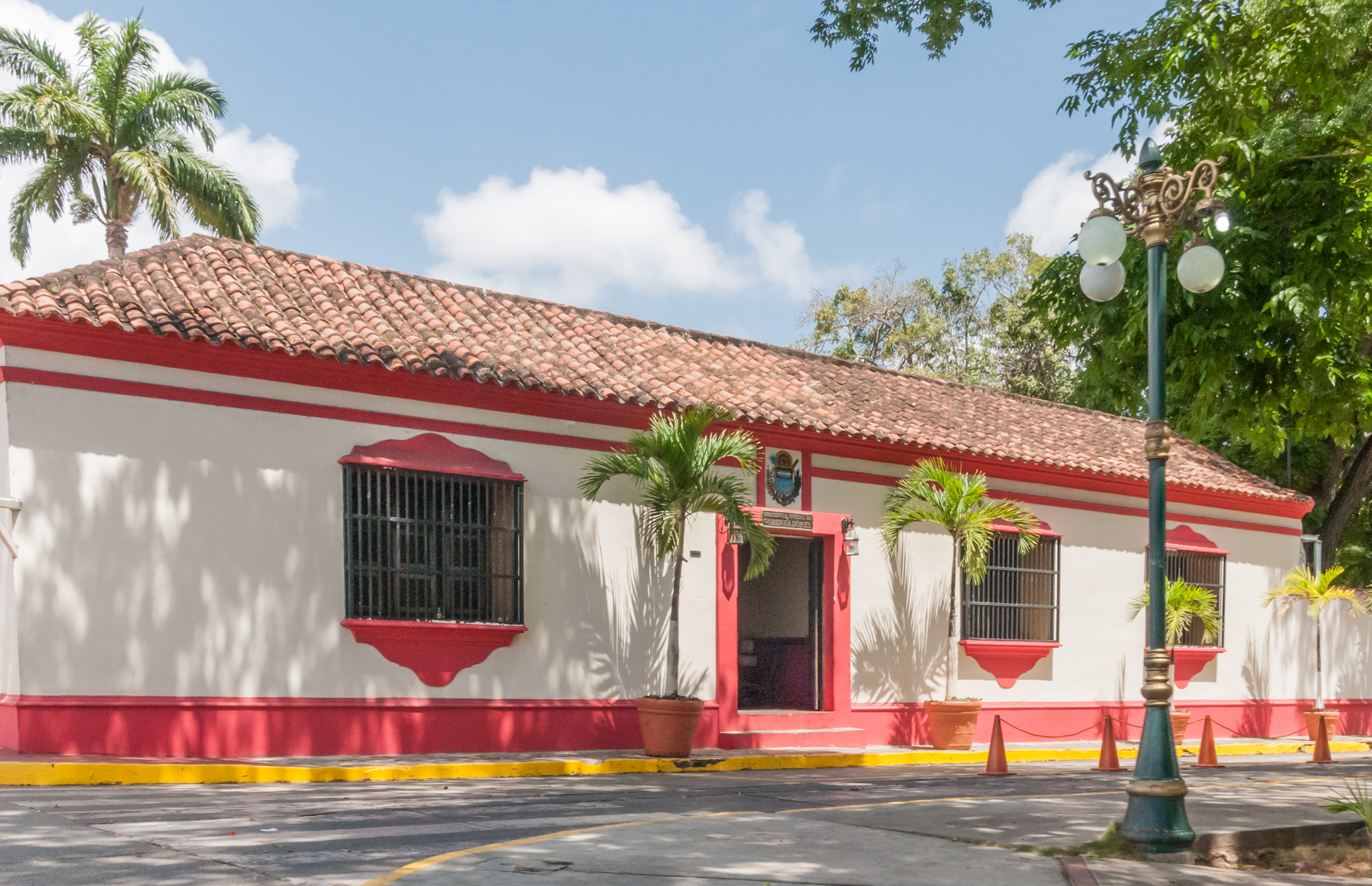
Colonial House of Police in La Asunción

The city has two banks, a post office, two museums, and a private hospital with modern facilities. The Palacio Municipal is located behind the cathedral and houses the offices of the state government. The Assemblea Legislativa occupies a former Franciscan monastery which has also served as a hospital and prison. A sundial fixed in 1612 at the initiative of a governor and known as the "Relox Equinoccia Inferior" is still visible here. The Plaza of La Asunción is divided into a southern half named for Simón Bolívar and a northern half named for Luisa Caceres, whose statue is installed there. An old two storey house has been converted into a souvenir shop with a coffee kiosk. The birthplace of the independence hero Juan Bautista Arismendi, husband of Luisa Caceres de Arismendi has been refurbished.

== Transportation ==
=== Air ===
La Asunción is located 30 kilometers from Santiago Mariño Caribbean International Airport which offers scheduled flights to mainland Venezuela as well as charter flights to international destinations.

=== Sea ===
Ferry services are available from a terminal 40 kilometers to the southwest in Punta de Piedras. Conferry offers service to Puerto La Cruz, Guanta, and La Guaira on mainland Venezuela as well as service to Coche Island.

== Landmarks ==
Some of the prominent landmarks of La Asunción are the cathedral of Nuestra Señora de la Asunción, the Santa Rosa castle, the Museo Nueva Cádiz, the Casa de la Cultura and Cerro El Copey National Park.

=== Catedral Nuestra Señora de La Asunción ===
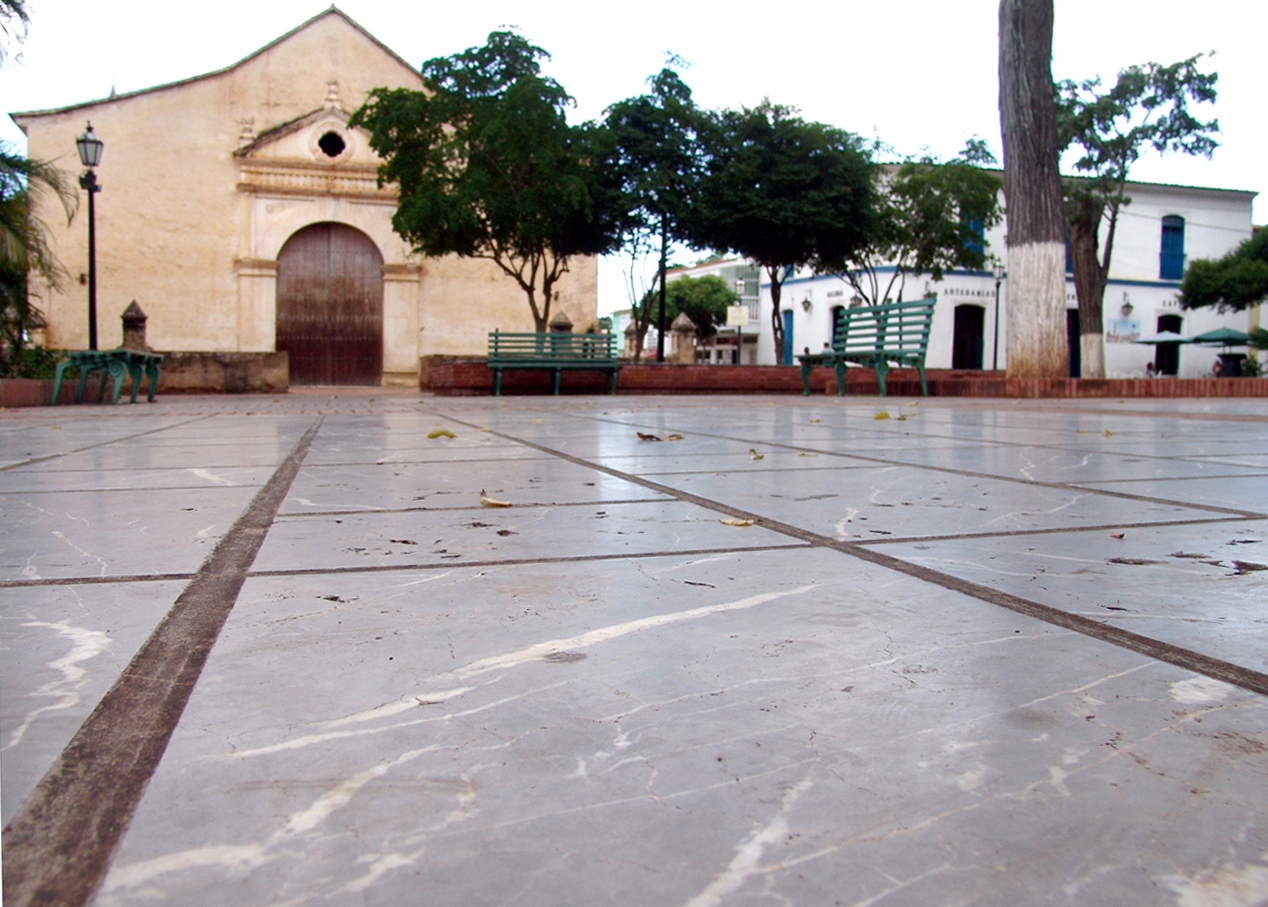
Cathedral of Nuestra Señora de La Asunción

Built between 1570 and 1612, the Catedral Nuestra Señora de La Asunción is the oldest existing church in Venezuela. Its construction was started in 1570 (much before the construction of the cathedral of Coro) and was never completed. A new church was built starting in 1609 which took 10 years to complete. The church has a rectangular plan with massive walls as protection against pirate attacks. Two lines of huge pillars support the roof. There is a bell tower outside and the bells are now preserved in the plaza. The cathedral is dedicated to Our Lady of the Assumption, a title borne by the Virgin Mary, and has been declared a historical city monument. It has a plain façade and interior, but its left lateral tower, which dates to 1599, is the oldest in the country. The most important festival observed here falls in mid-August, coinciding with the Feast of the Assumption on the Roman Catholic calendar, when a procession is held and mass offered in the church.

=== Castle of Santa Rosa de la Eminencia ===
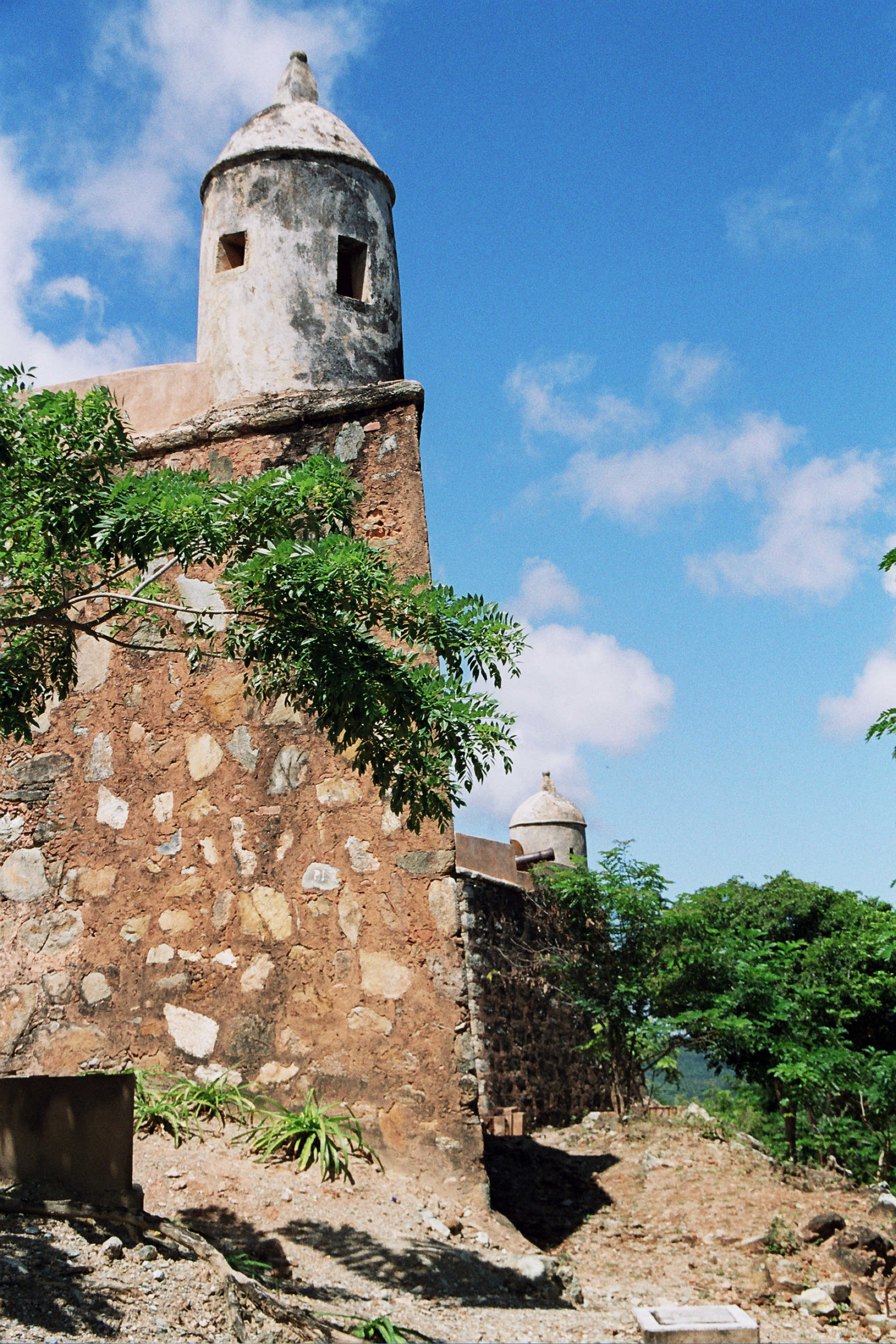
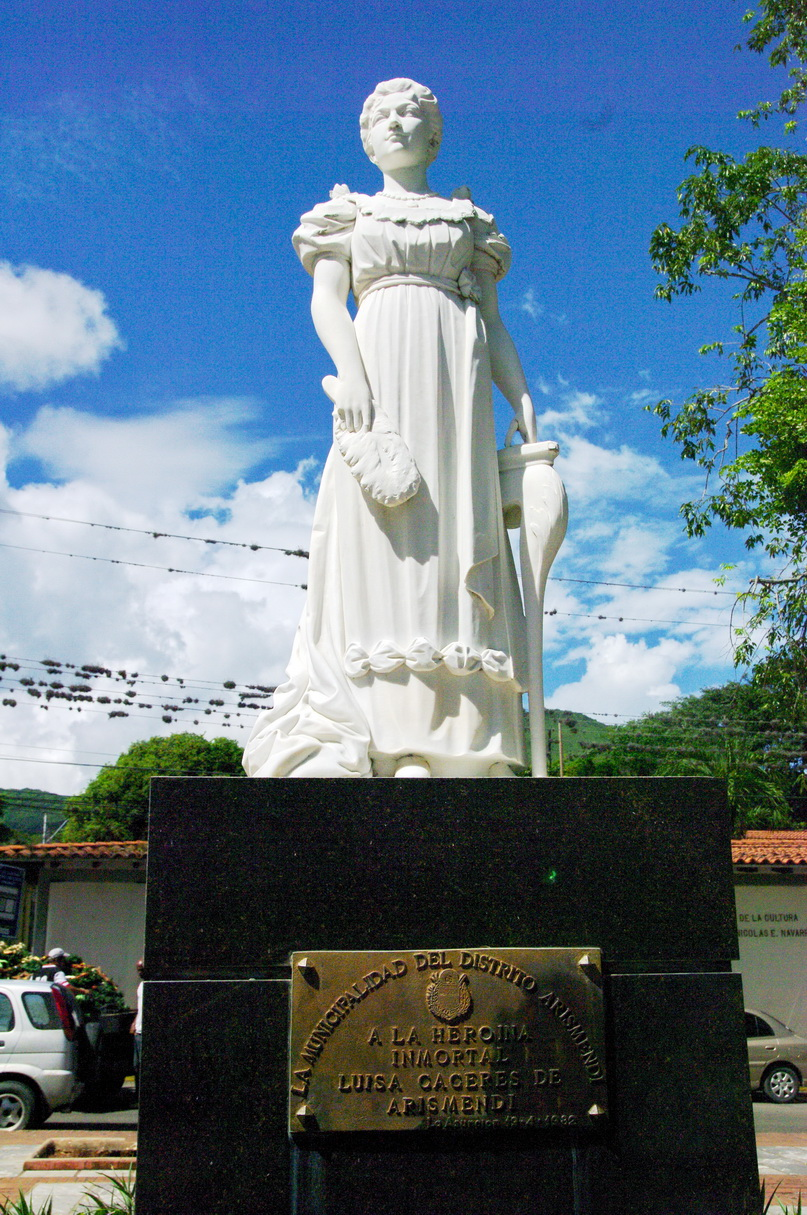
Left: Santa Rosa de la Eminencia castle; right: Statue of Luisa Cáceres de Arismendi.

The Santa Rosa de la Eminencia castle was built in 1682. Due to its prominent location on a hill, it acted as an observatory to watch for any invading forces approaching from the north, south, or east. A tunnel (a kilometer long, dug during the original construction) from the fort connected it to the governor's house, the church, and the Convent of San Francisco. The fort guarded the eastern approach to the capital and was one of three forts that secured the island's strategic location to fend off the English, French, Dutch and other colonizers. It was where Luisa Caceres de Arismendi, wife of the leading freedom fighter Juan Bautista Arismendi against Spanish imperialism, was imprisoned after capture by the Spanish on 27 September 1816. She had been taken prisoner three days earlier, on the day before her 17th birthday. She became a local heroine; in the prison cell of the fort, her first son was born and died prematurely due to lack of medical attention. She was imprisoned as her husband had escaped to the forests of Cerro El Copey and by capturing her they hoped that they could make the freedom fighter to surrender but the plan failed. After the death of the baby she was moved to Spain from where she escaped. She eventually joined her husband with whom she begot 11 children and died at the age of 65. After her death she had the honour of becoming one of two women buried in the National Pantheon in Caracas. The cell where she was incarcerated in the castle has been preserved in its original form. An inscription at the entrance to the cell reads "Luisa Caceres de Arismendi for her virtue valour and martyrdom for her husband and country as prisoner in this jail when she was 16 years of age." The fort has exhibits of weapons of war, paintings of Simon Bolivar, knights in armor, and also iron balls which were tied to the legs of prisoners. Behind the kitchen there is a bottle dungeon whose entrance is through a hole in the roof. The fort provides an excellent view of the sea and Cerro Matasiete. It had a moat and a draw bridge which no longer exist. The map on display in the museum is reported to be the best in the world.

=== Museum Nueva Cádiz ===
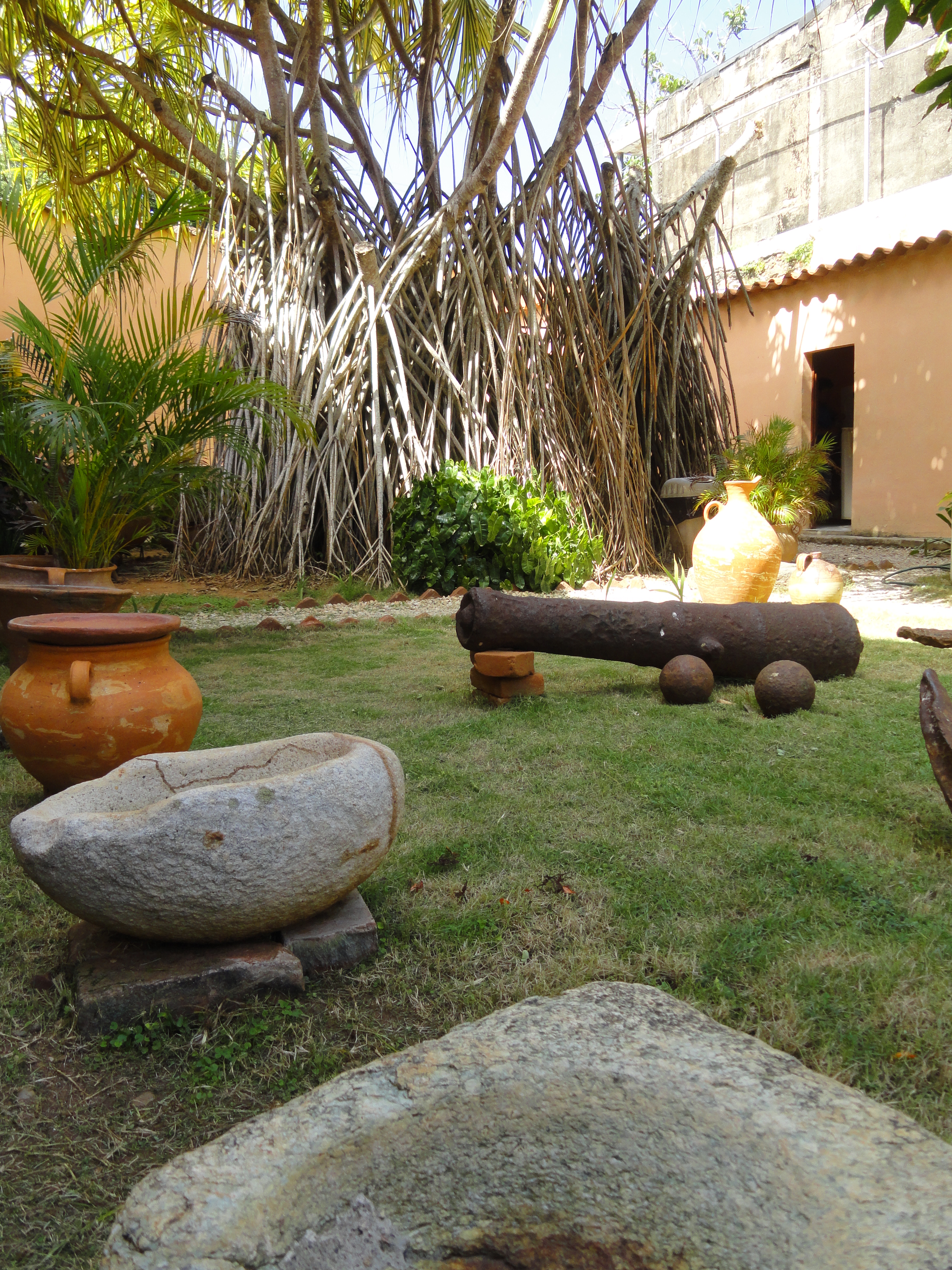
Patio of the museum

The Casa Capitular, the seat of the colonial government, and a city hall has been re-purposed as the Museo Nueva Cádiz (New Cádiz Museum) which features displays of precolonial artifacts and local handicrafts. Initially, as the seat of the government, it had housed the offices in the first floor and a prison on the ground floor. On May 4, 1810, the museum was the venue for Margarita's Declaration of Independence following the declaration made in Caracas on April 19, 1810. As the prison space was inadequate to accommodate the large number of prisoners, it was converted into a museum with a gallery and a library.

An interesting display in the museum is a sculpture of the tyrant Lope de Aguirre who terrorized the islanders in 1561. (This event is featured in the film titled Aguirre, the Wrath of God produced by Werner Herzog with Klaus Kinski in the lead role.)

=== Casa de Juan Bautista Arismendi ===
Casa de Juan Bautista Arismendi honors Venezuela's war hero, Juan Bautista Arismendi.

=== Casa de la Cultura ===
The Casa de la Cultura is located opposite the church and has a theater. A pre-Columbian pottery collection is on display here and replicas of the same could be bought in the nearby town of Santa Ana.

=== Cerro El Copey National Park ===
Isla Margarita and particularly Cerro El Copey National Park are especially important with respect to the numbers of endemic species they harbor. The island was connected to mainland until the Pleistocene. As a result, there is a predominance of typical continental bird families like Tinamidae, Dendrocolaptidae, Formicaridae and Furnaridae, which are totally absent from the Antilles. Circa 31 mammal species are found on the island, four of which (the red-tailed squirrel Sciurus granatensis nesaeus, the eastern cottontail rabbit Sylvilagus floridanus margaritae, the white-tailed dear Odocoileus virginianus margaritae, and the capuchin monkey Cebus apella margaritae) are endemic subspecies, with the main populations located inside the national park. The Margarita capuchin monkey is considered to be the country's most threatened primate species and is critically endangered.

== Gallery ==
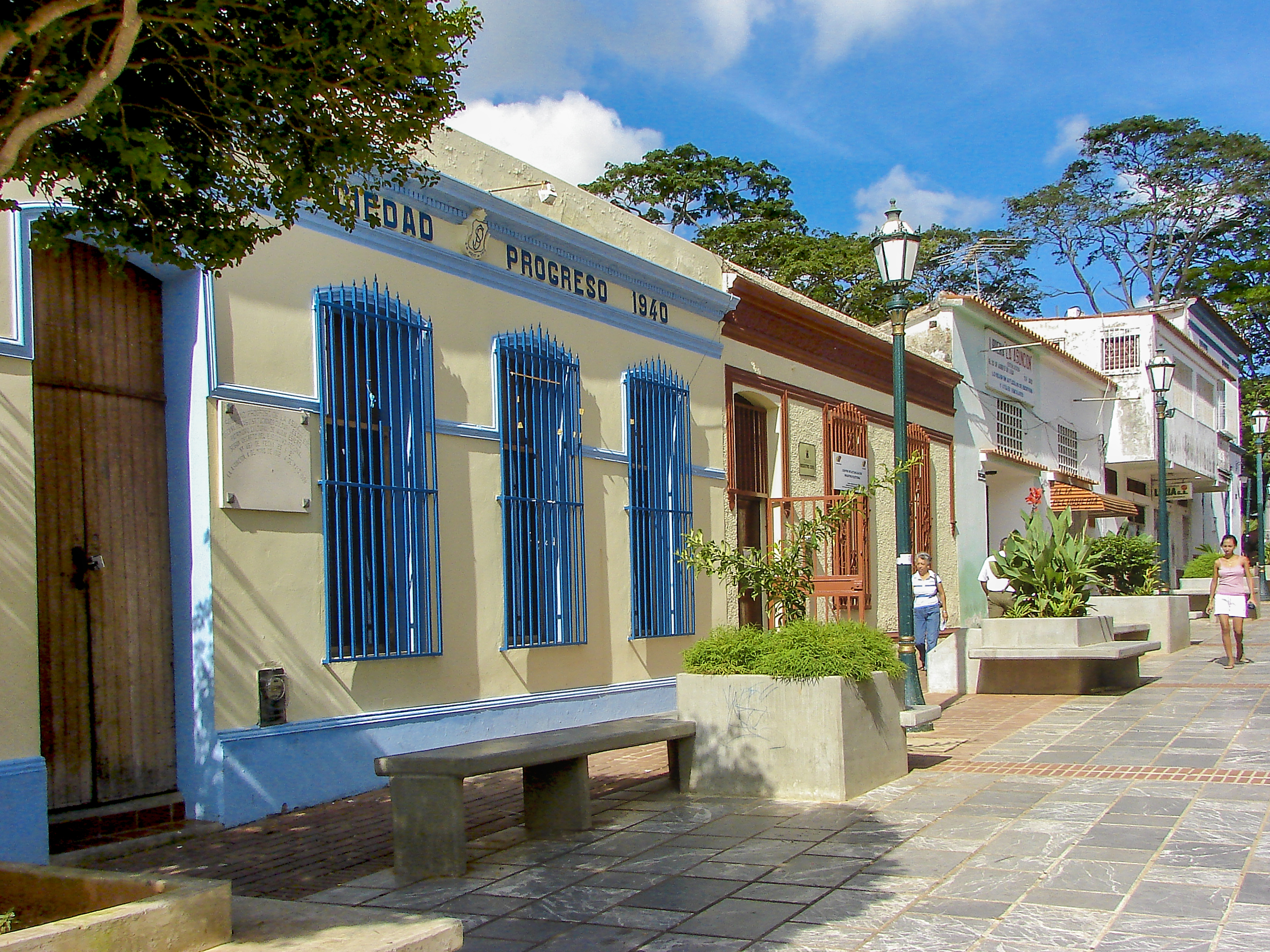
Colonial street in La Asuncion

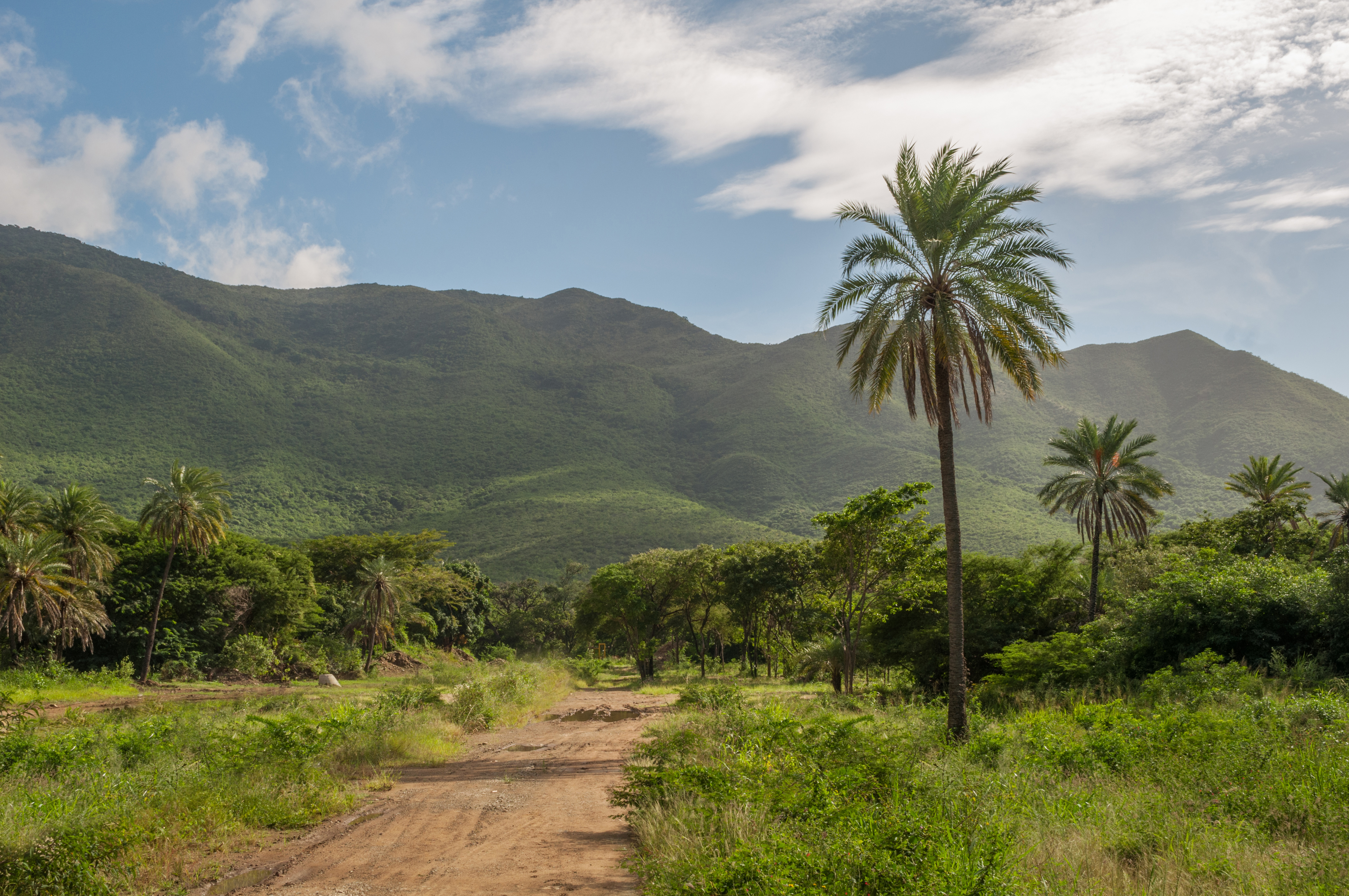
Cerro el Copey National Park

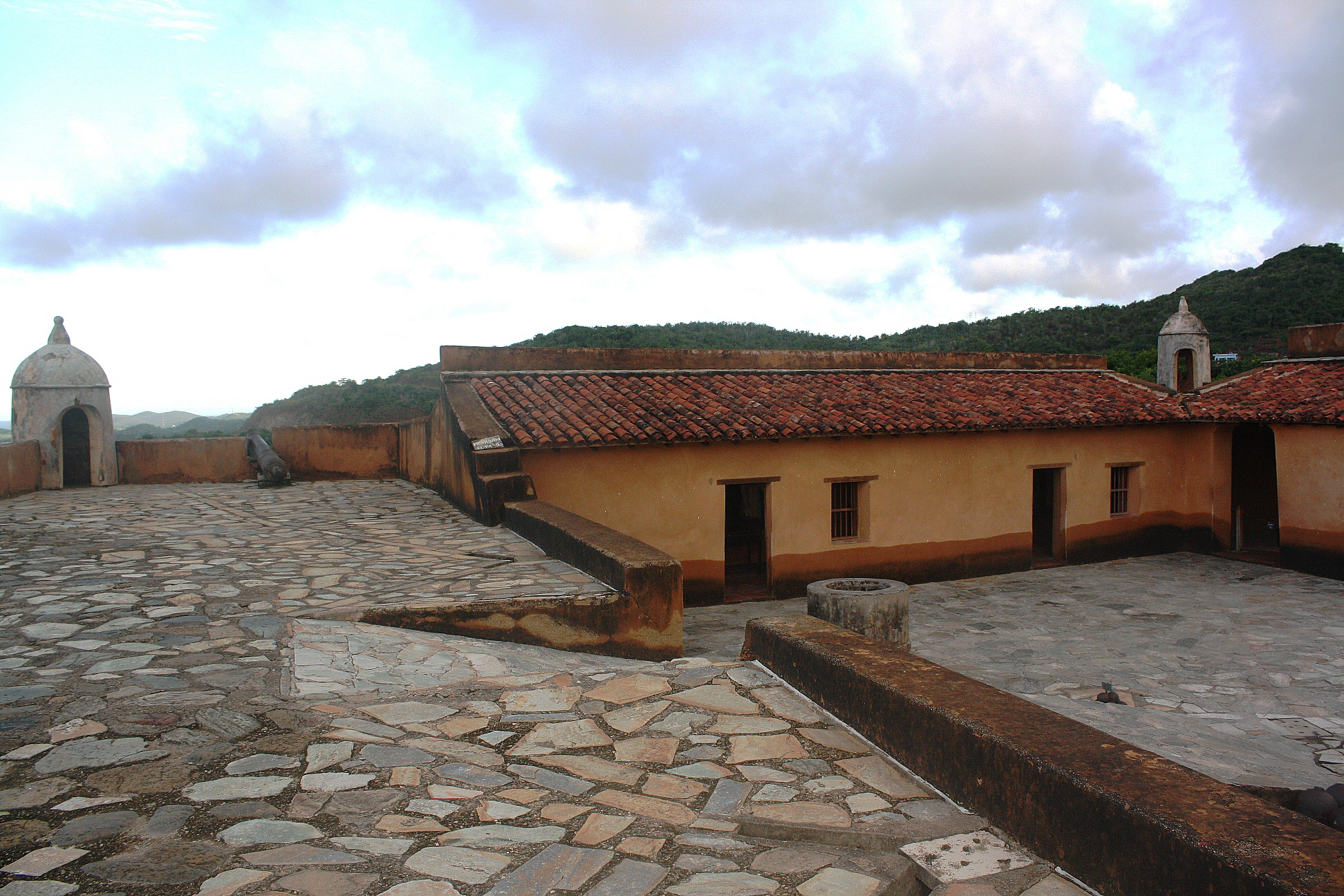
Santa Rosa Castle

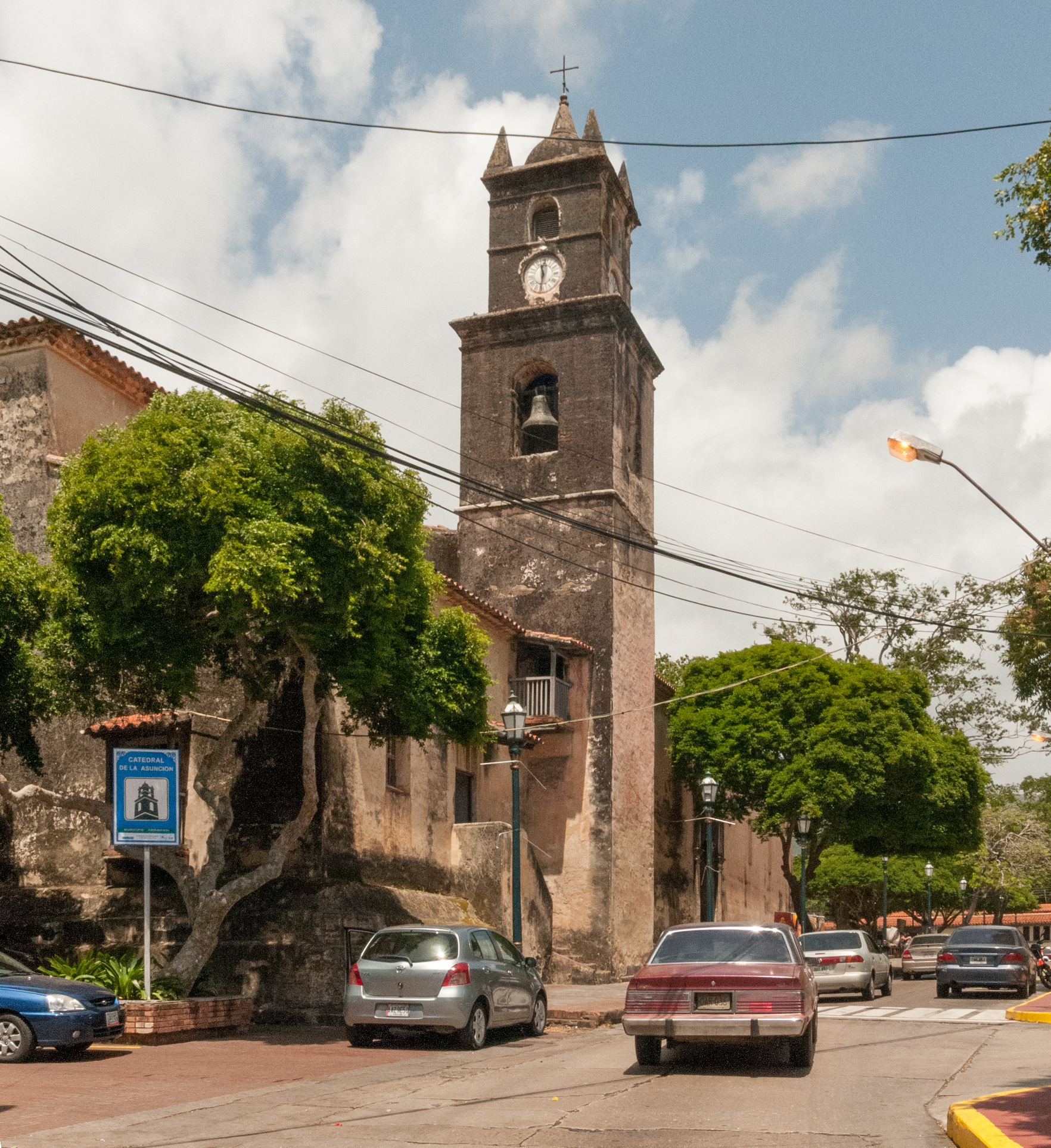
La Asunción Cathedral

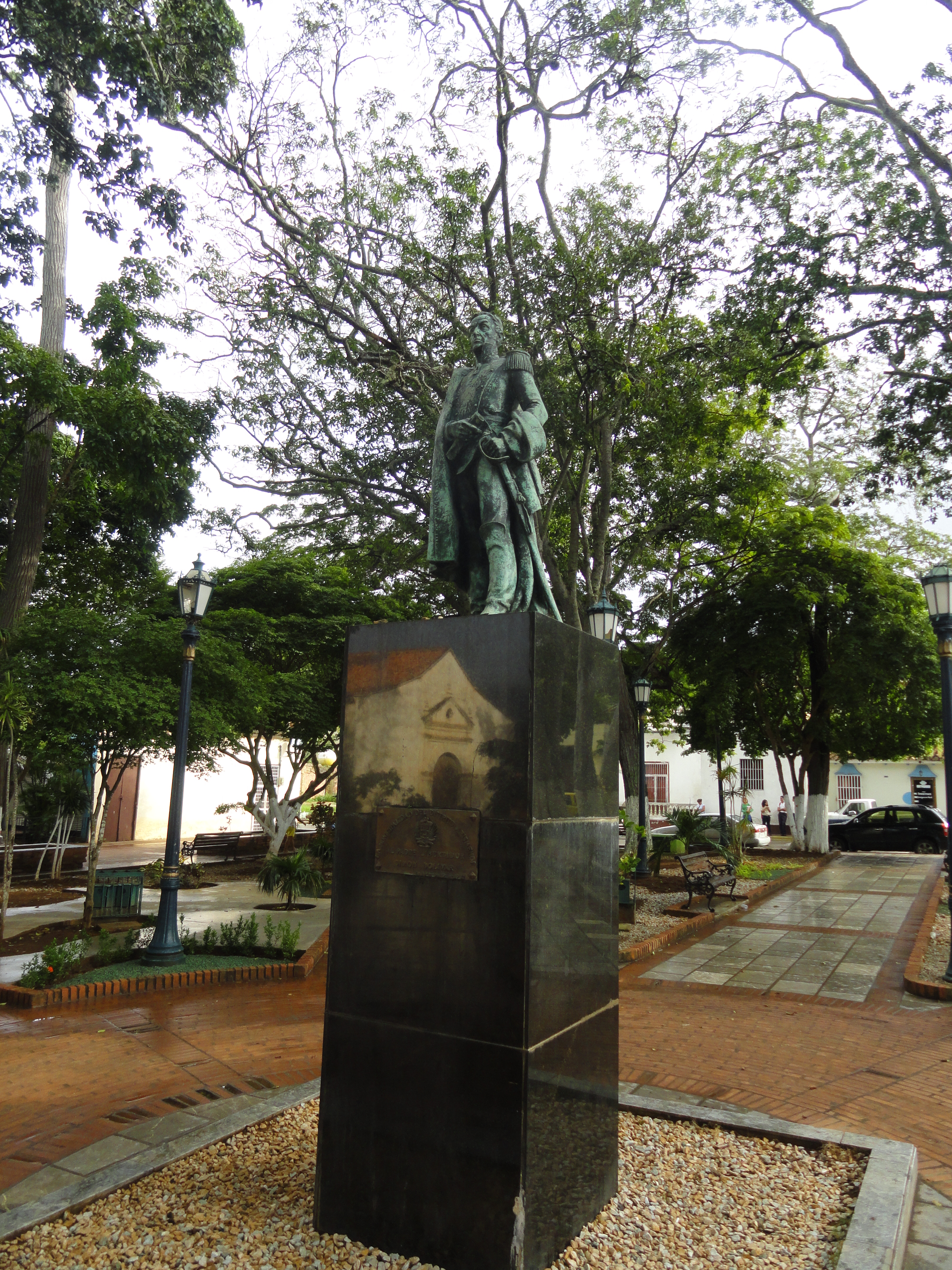
Bolívar Square

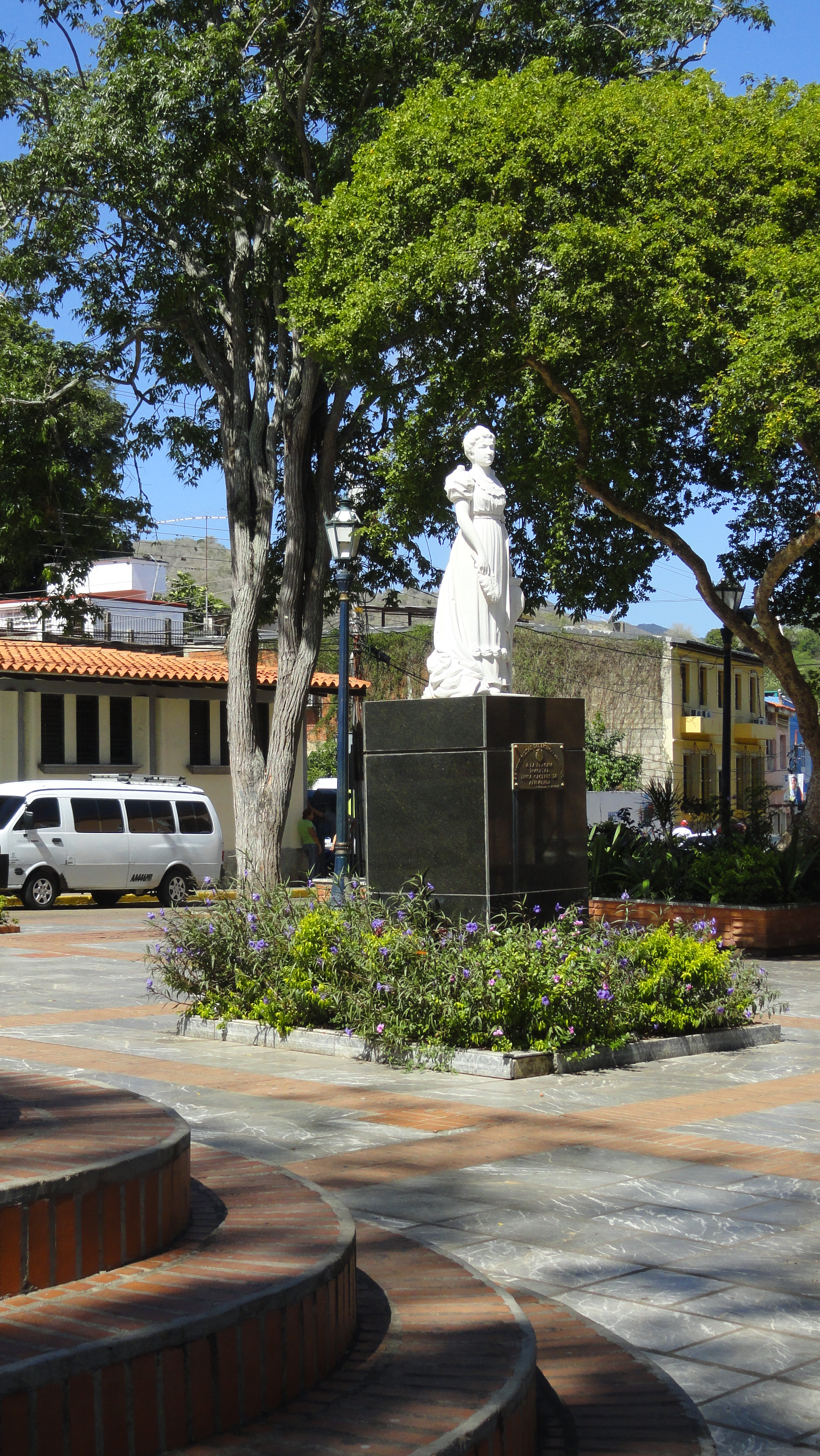
Luisa Cáceres de Arismendi Square

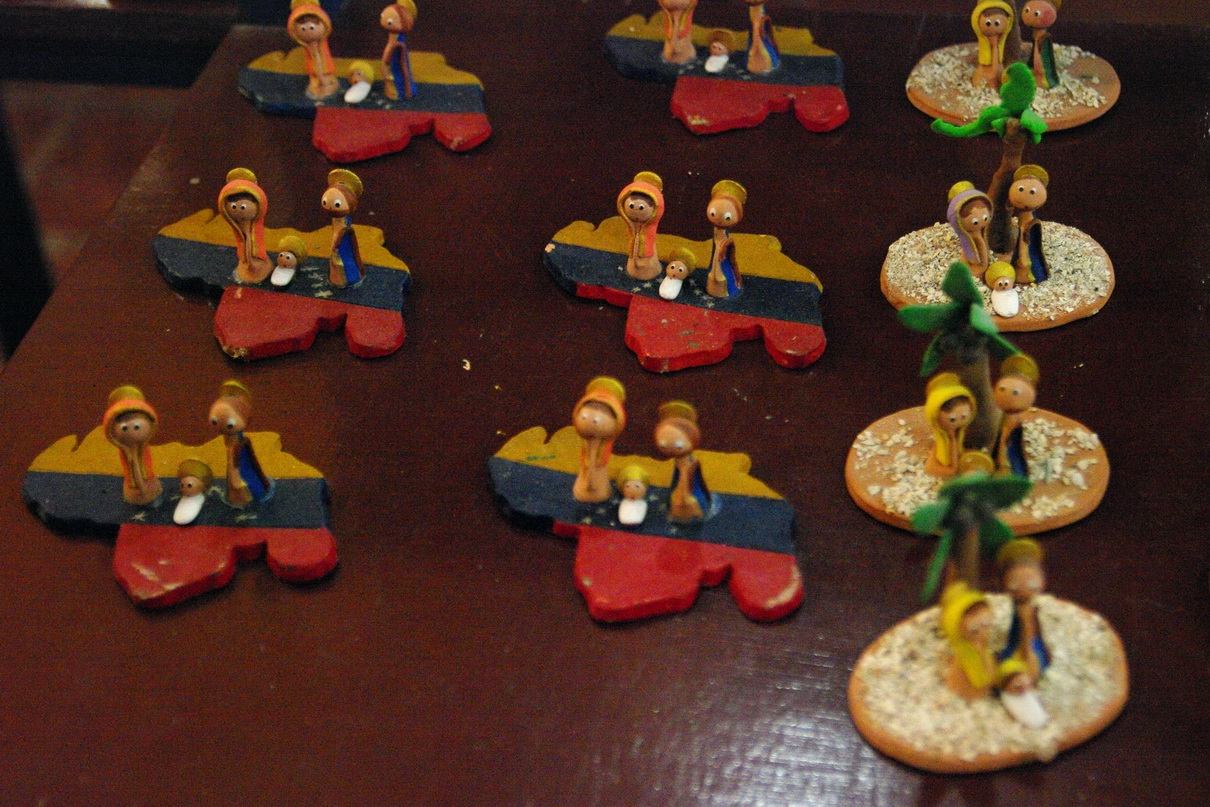
Crafts in La Asunción

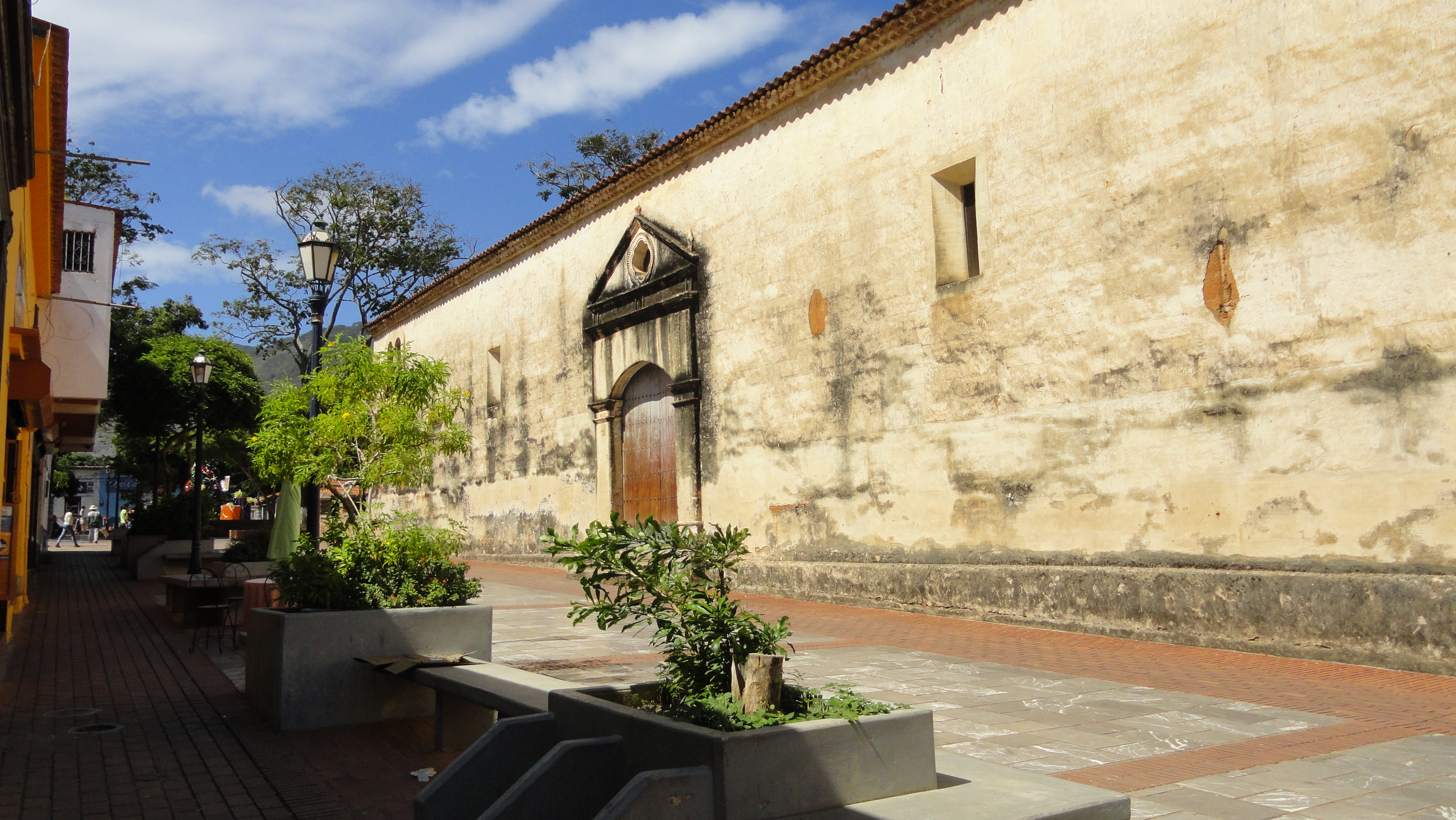
5 de Julio Boulevard

== Notable people ==
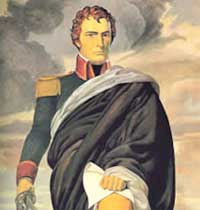
Francisco Esteban Gómez

- Juan Fermín de Huidobro (1783-1853)- governor of Margarita
- Francisco Esteban Gómez (1783-1853) - military leader who died in La Asunción
- Modesta Bor (1926-1998) - composer
- Luis Beltrán Prieto Figueroa (1902-1993) - national politician
- Juan Bautista Arismendi (1775-1841) - revolutionary general during the War of Independence
- Luisa Cáceres de Arismendi (1799-1866) - hero of the War of Independence
- José Enrique “Chelique” Sarabia - singer and songwriter
