= Fernando de Mendoza Mate de Luna =

Spanish politician (1610–1692)

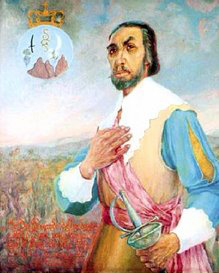
Fernando de Mendoza y Mate de Luna.

Fernando de Mendoza Mate de Luna ( 1610 – 1692 ) was born in Cadiz. He served multiple Governorships including; Governor of Isla Margarita (Venezuela) 1649-54, Governor of Tucuman (Argentina)1681-86. He founded the city of San Fernando Valley of Catamarca in 1683, and he authorized the transfer of Tucuman. He was later appointed mayor of Santiago de Chile.

Father Lozano in his manuscript, “History of the Conquest of Paraguay”, stated that Mate de Luna was, “ a knight of notorious nobility, who enamelled with his prowess in war and illustrious example of virtue and prudence in government.”
