= Juan Bautista Arismendi =

Venezuelan general (1775–1841)

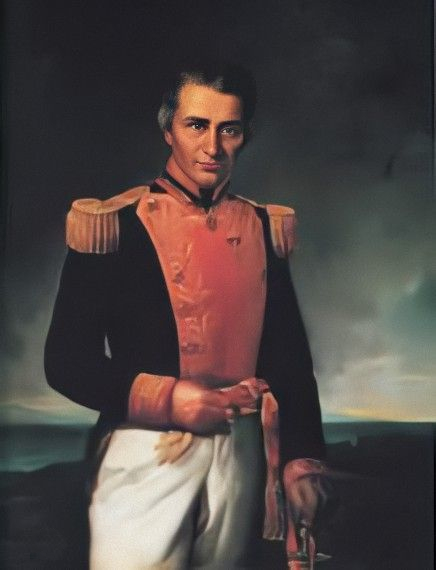

Personal details
- Born: La Asunción, Margarita Province, Viceroyalty of New Granada, Spanish Empire
- Citizenship: Spanish (c. 1770–1810); Venezuelan (1811–1812); Venezuelan (1813–1814); Venezuelan (1817–1819); Colombian (1819–1830); Venezuelan (1830–1841)

Juan Bautista Arismendi (March 15, 1775 – June 22, 1841) was a neogranadan patriot and general of the Venezuelan War of Independence. He is buried in the National Pantheon of Venezuela.

Arismendi was born in La Asuncion, Isla Margarita in 1775. He was a captain when the revolution broke out and took command of the patriots and drove the Spanish General Pablo Morillo from the island after a long conflict. He was one of the leaders that assembled a provincial congress at Angostura on 20 July 1817, and put at the head of the government a triumvirate of which Bolivar was a member. In 1819 he assisted Bolivar and Paez to drive Morillo from New Granada and from the greater part of Venezuela. In Bolivar's absence the Angostura congress forced Francisco Antonio Zea, whom he had appointed vice-president, to resign, and chose Arismendi in his place. On his return Bolivar restored Zea and exiled Arismendi to Margarita. Notwithstanding this, Arismendi espoused the cause of Bolivar during the insurrection headed by Paez in 1826, and rendered great service to the nation.
