= List of castles in Venezuela =

This is a list of castles in Venezuela.

Name	Location	Picture
Fortín Solano	Puerto Cabello	
San Carlos de Borromeo Fortress	Isla Margarita	
San Carlos de la Barra Fortress	Lake Maracaibo	
San Felipe Castle	Puerto Cabello	
Santa María de la Cabeza castle	Cumaná	
Santa Rosa de la Eminencia castle	Margarita Island	
