= Dominic von Habsburg =

Archduke Dominic of Austria
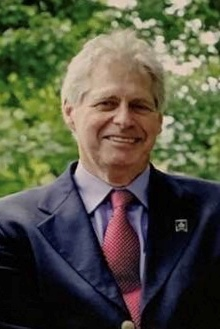
- Dominic in 2009

Carlist-Carloctavismo claimant to the Spanish throne
- Pretense: 9 May 1975 - present
- Predecessor: Archduke Franz Josef of Austria, Prince of Tuscany
- Born: 4 July 1937 (age 88); Vienna, Austria
- Spouse: Virginia Engel von Voss (m. 1960; div. 1999) Emmanuella Mlynarski (m. 1999)
- Issue: 3
Names
- Domingo de Habsburgo-Lorena y de Romania and Dominic von Habsburg-Lothringen, Erzherzog von Österreich, Prinz von Toskana
- House: Habsburg-Lorraine
- Father: Archduke Anton of Austria
- Mother: Princess Ileana of Romania

Dominic von Habsburg (born 4 July 1937) is a member of the Grand Ducal Family of Tuscany and the House of Habsburg-Lorraine.

Dominic was born in 1937 at Sonnberg Castle (near Hollabrunn, Austria), where he was baptized Dominic Habsburg-Lothringen. In the family, he is nicknamed "Niki". In 1942, after spending the first few years of his childhood at Sonnberg Castle, he moved with his parents, his brother and his four sisters to Romania. There, Dominic resided with his family at Bran Castle in Braşov. After his first cousin, King Michael I of Romania, was forced to abdicate the throne in 1947, Dominic and his family were exiled by the Communist regime and sought refuge in Switzerland and Argentina before ultimately settling in the United States.

== Personal life ==
In 1956, the Comunión Carloctavista y Círculo Carlos VIII courted Dominic as the legitimate Carlist claimant and heir to the Spanish throne to counter Generalísimo Francisco Franco's choice of Juan Carlos as king of Spain. In 1975, the Comunión Carloctavista y Círculo Carlos VIII affirmed his legitimacy as Domingo I.

Dominic returned to Austria in 1961 and resided there until 1976, when he moved to the Dominican Republic, Antigua, Italy and finally settled in New York. He was naturalized as a United States citizen in 2004.

He gained international renown in 2006 following the restitution of Bran Castle (commonly known as Dracula's Castle) in Transylvania, Romania, which had been appropriated by the Communists in 1948.

In 2012, Senator Iñaki Anasagasti of the Basque County proposed the idea of creating a Catalan-Basque-Navarrese monarchy, with Dominic as its king. In the same year he became a Knight of the Order of the Austrian Golden Fleece.

=== Marriages and children ===
He married firstly Virginia Engel von Voss (31 March 1937 – 27 September 2000) on 11 June 1960. They had two sons and divorced in 1999.

He married secondly the Israeli-born Emmanuella Mlynarski (born 14 January 1948), former wife of Israeli statesman and Ambassador to the UN Gad Yaacobi, on 14 August 1999. He legally adopted Emmanuella's daughter in 2014.

== Professional life ==
Dominic is an alumnus of the Brooks School and the Rhode Island School of Design, graduating from RISD in 1960 with a BFA in Industrial Design. In 1962, he established his own design and marketing consultancy firm in Austria, which covered a variety of companies and products throughout Europe and the United States. In 1969, he founded and directed the department for Product Research, Development and Design, at Semperit AG (later Continental Tire).

Between 1974 and 1978, the United Nations Industrial Development Organization and the World Bank enlisted him as an expert in Central America and Africa for small and medium-size industries. He was also an arts instructor in the Piesting grade school in Austria (1974–75), and a professor of industrial engineering and management at CEAT-INTEC in the Dominican Republic.

In 1976, he established a silk-screen printing studio for tropical fashions in Antigua, West Indies. At the request of the Antiguan W.I. Ministry of Education, he conducted courses for educators in hand-crafts and fine arts.

Today, Dominic is retired and living in New York. He continues to pursue art and design, as well as running Bran Castle.

== Titles ==
As a member of the Tuscan line of the House of Habsburg-Lorraine, Dominic is an Archduke of Austria, Royal Prince of Hungary and Bohemia, Prince of Tuscany, with the style His Imperial and Royal Highness.
