= Bran Castle =

- Romanian: Castelul Bran; German: (Die) Törzburg; Hungarian: Törcsvár
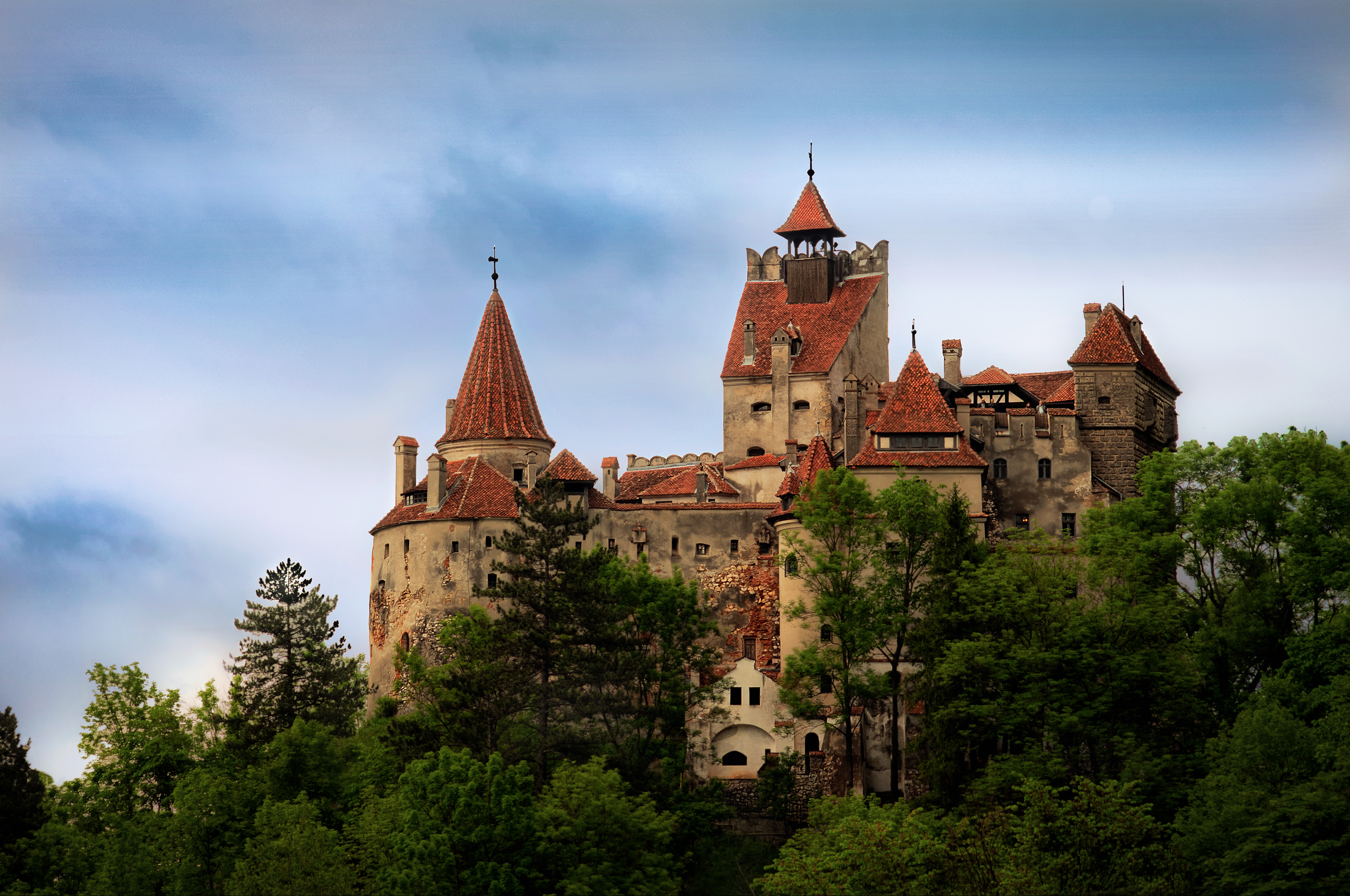
- Bran Castle

- Location within Romania
- Alternative names: Dracula's Castle

General information
- Type: Castle
- Architectural style: Medieval
- Location: Bran, near Brașov, Transylvania, 24, Gen. Traian Moșoiu St., Romania
- Coordinates: 45°30′54″N 25°22′02″E
- Elevation: 2,500 feet (760 m)
- Owner: Archduke Dominic of Austria-Tuscany

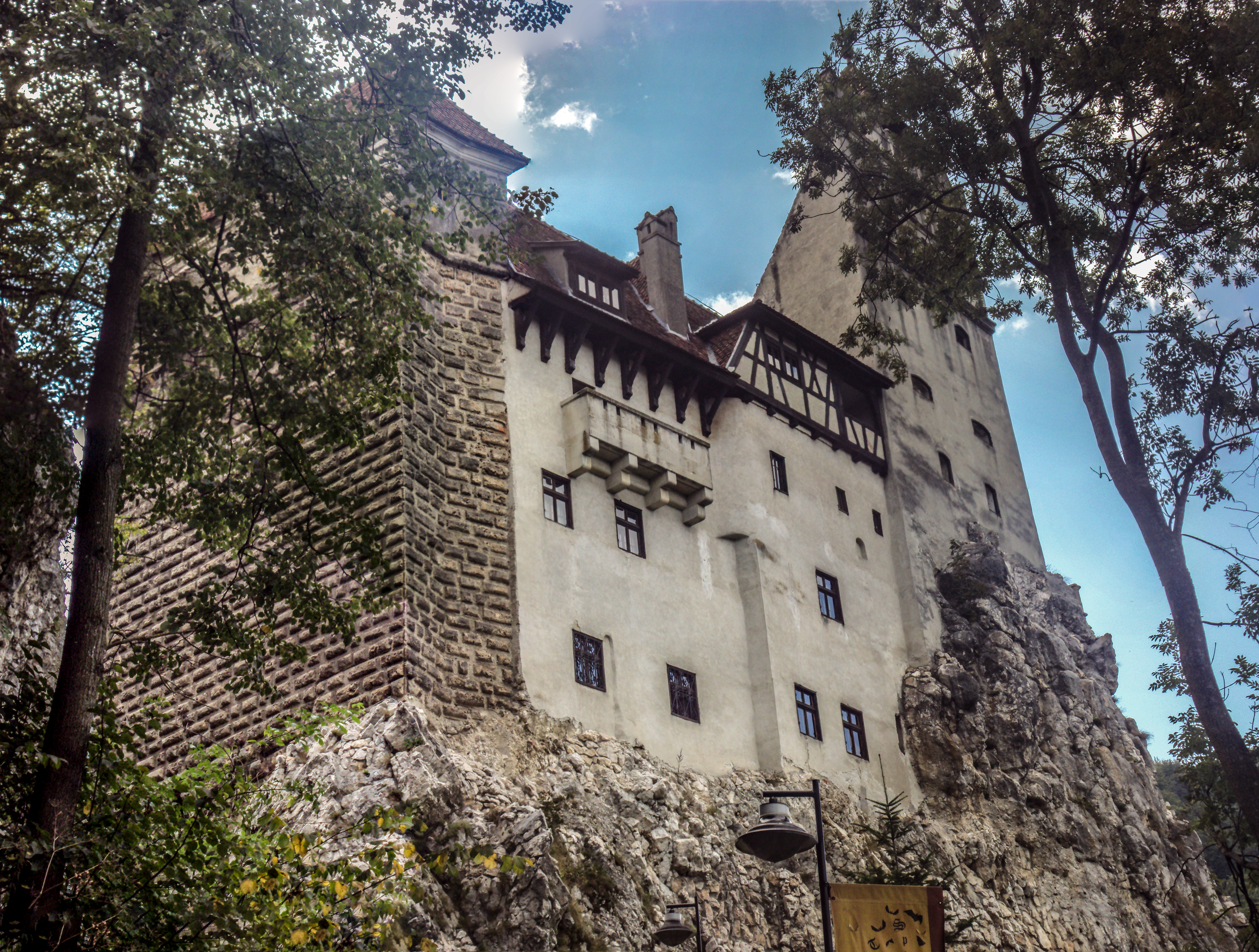
Bran Castle

Bran Castle (Romanian: Castelul Bran; German: Schloss Bran or Die Törzburg; ) is a castle in Bran, 25 kilometres (16 mi) southwest of Brașov. The castle was built by Saxons in 1377 who were given the privilege by Louis I of Hungary. It is a national monument and landmark in Transylvania. The fortress is on the Transylvanian side of the historical border with Wallachia, on road DN73.

Marketed outside Romania as Dracula's Castle, it is presented as the home of the title character in Bram Stoker's novel Dracula (1897). There is no evidence that Stoker knew anything about this castle, which has only tangential associations with Vlad the Impaler, voivode of Wallachia, whose byname 'Drăculea' resembles that of Dracula. Stoker's description of Dracula's crumbling fictional castle also bears no resemblance to Bran Castle.

The castle is now a museum dedicated to displaying art and furniture collected by Queen Marie. Tourists can see the interior on their own or by a guided tour. At the bottom of the hill is a small open-air museum exhibiting traditional Romanian peasant structures (cottages, barns, water-driven machinery, etc.) from the Bran region.

== History ==
=== Potential first castle ===
Based on the controversial information in the "Székely Chronicle of Csik" (Hungarian: Csíki székely krónika), whose veracity is questionable, it can be concluded that the original fortification was built in the 11th century by the Székelys, who were settled here by King Ladislaus I of Hungary, under the leadership of Stephen Sándor (Hungarian: Sándor István), to protect this strategically important territory from attacks by the Cumans and Pechenegs. It was likely subsequently destroyed during their next raid, as the territory was ceded to the Teutonic Order in the 13th century, and construction of a new fortification began.

=== Wooden castle of the German Order ===
In 1211, the Teutonic Order received this land as a gift from Andrew II to ensure the protection of Hungary from the Cumans. In 1212, the Teutonic Order built the wooden castle of Dietrichstein as a fortified position in the Burzenland at the entrance to a mountain pass through which traders had travelled for more than a millennium. This castle was destroyed by royal troops during the expulsion of the Teutonic Order from the territory of the Kingdom of Hungary, around 1225.

The castle's original name, Dietrichstein or lapis Theoderici in Latin, lit. "Dietrich's Stone", seems to have been derived from the Comthur (Commander) and regional Preceptor, frater Theodericus, mentioned in a 1212 document. This Dietrich is the probable builder of the castle. A 1509 document confirms that the Törzburg county had once belonged to Commander Dietrich of the Teutonic Order.

=== Stone castle of the Kronstadt Saxons ===
The first documented mention of Bran Castle is the act issued by Louis I of Hungary on 19 November 1377, giving the Saxons of Kronstadt (modern Brașov) the privilege to build the stone castle at their own expense and labour force; the settlement of Bran began to develop nearby. In 1438–1442, the castle was used in defense against the Ottoman Empire, and later became a customs post on the mountain pass between Transylvania and Wallachia. Although many castles of the time belonged to members of the nobility, it has been established that Bran Castle was built almost exclusively for fortification and protection of German colonists in Transylvania. It is believed the castle was briefly held by Mircea the Elder of Wallachia (r. 1386–95, 1397–1418) during whose period the customs point was established. The Wallachian ruler Vlad Țepeș (Vlad the Impaler; 1448–1476) does not seem to have had a significant role in the history of the fortress, although he passed several times through the Bran Gorge. At some point, Bran Castle belonged to the Hungarian kings, but due to the failure of King Vladislas II (r. 1471–1516) to repay loans, the city of Brașov regained possession of the fortress in 1533.

In 1530, Moise of Wallachia, Voivode of Wallachia, sent an army to capture the castle, but the Székely soldiers led by the castle lord Dénes defended the building, thereby forcing the Wallachian army to retreat.

Bran played a militarily strategic role up to the mid-18th century.

=== Royal residence and aftermath ===
With the 1920 Treaty of Trianon, Hungary lost Transylvania, and the castle became a royal residence within the Kingdom of Romania after being given to the royal house by the Saxons of Kronstadt-Braşov, who had no more use for it and no interest in financing the time-damaged property. It became the favorite home and retreat of Marie of Romania, who ordered its extensive renovation conducted by the Czech architect Karel Zdeněk Líman. The castle was inherited by her daughter Princess Ileana who ran a hospital there in World War II. It was later seized by the communist regime with the expulsion of the royal family in 1948.

In 2005 the Romanian government passed a law allowing restitution claims on properties illegally expropriated, such as Bran, and thus a year later ownership of the castle was awarded to Archduke Dominic of Austria, a son of Princess Ileana.

On 18 May 2006, after a period of legal proceedings, the castle was legally returned to the children of Princess Ileana. However, through the Ministry of Culture, the Romanian state was also to administer it for the next three years.

In September 2007 an investigation committee of the Romanian Parliament stated that the retrocession of the castle to Archduke Dominic was illegal, as it broke the Romanian law on property and succession. However, in October 2007 the Constitutional Court of Romania rejected the parliament's petition on the matter. In addition, an investigation commission of the Romanian government issued a decision in December 2007 reaffirming the validity and legality of the restitution procedures used and confirming that the restitution was made in full compliance with the law.

On 18 May 2009 administration of Bran Castle was transferred from the government to Archduke Dominic and his sisters, Archduchess Maria Magdalena (2 October 1939 – 18 August 2021) and Archduchess Elisabeth (15 January 1942 – 2 January 2019). On 1 June 2009, the Habsburgs opened the refurbished castle to the public as the first private museum in the country and presented a joint strategic concept in collaboration with Bran village to maintain their prominent role in the Romanian tourist circuit and to safeguard the economic base in the region.

== "Dracula's Castle" ==
Though many myths have been connected to the castle in connection with the Dracula myth, most historians agree that Vlad III Dracula, also known as Vlad the Impaler, never lived in Castle Bran, which was neither a friendly place for him to visit nor under his rule. It was once believed that he was imprisoned there after he was captured by the Hungarians in 1462, but historians now conclude that he was imprisoned in a fortress in Budapest.

=== Connection to Bram Stoker's Dracula ===
Bran Castle is not mentioned in the novel Dracula, and there is no evidence that Stoker ever visited either Transylvania or Bran Castle. Furthermore, the novel's description of the castle does not match Bran Castle. The claimed connection between the castle and the Dracula legend is tourism-driven.

During Stoker's research on the region of Transylvania, he came across accounts of the atrocities committed by Vlad III, and used the Dracula name after reading on the subject; but his inspiration for Dracula was not solely based on the historical figure. It is largely due to American cinema that Vlad III is considered the inspiration for the Dracula character.

== Other mentions in popular culture ==
Most of Laurie R. King's novel Castle Shade (2022), part of her series about Sherlock Holmes and Mary Russell, is set in and near Bran Castle in 1925.

In the documentary Romania: Seeking Dracula’s Castle (2020), this is the first castle that the presenters, Greg and Felicity, visit in order to contrast the ‘tourist’ view of Dracula with the actual history of Vlad the Impaler.

=== Image gallery ===
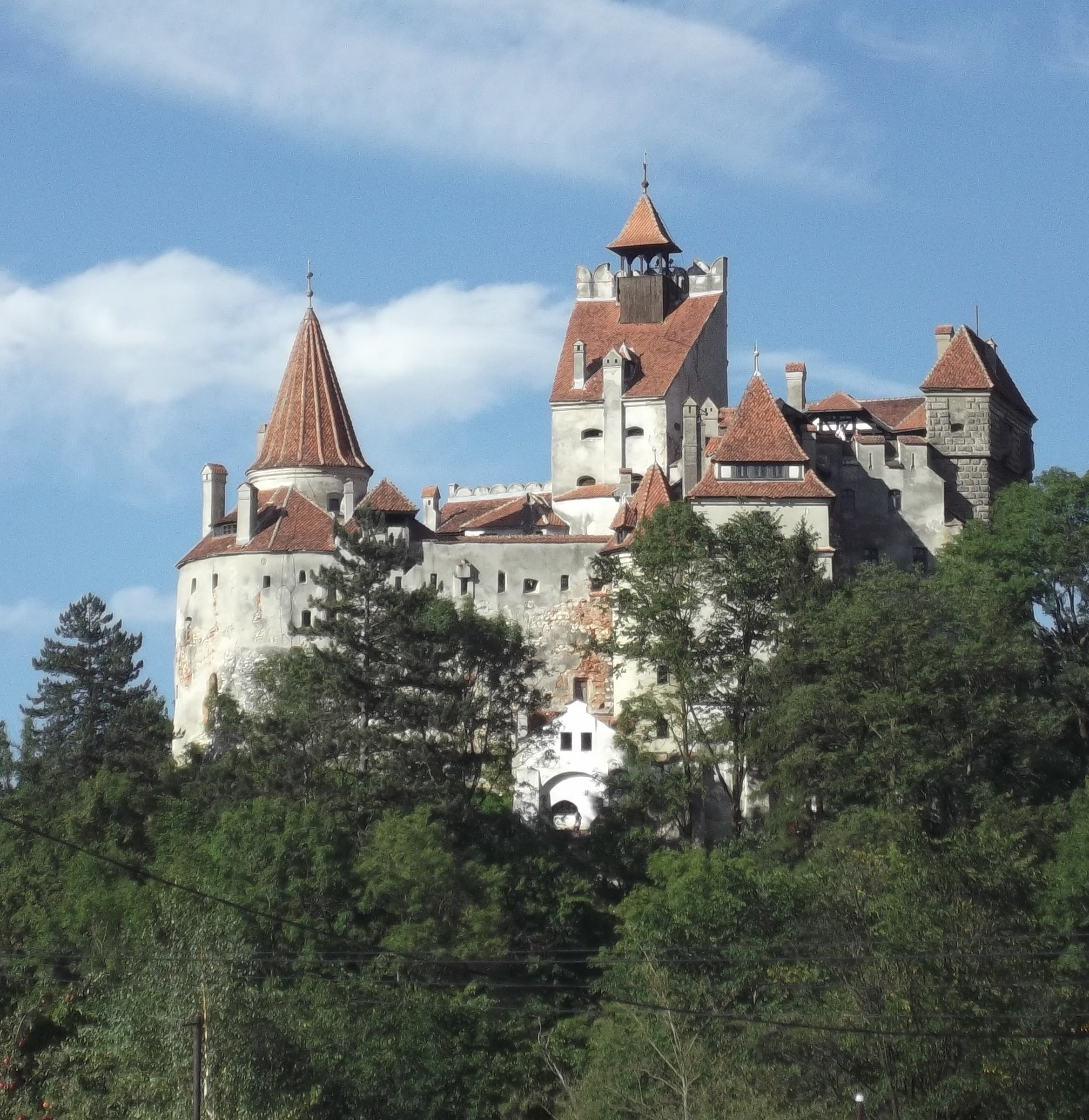
The castle in 2012

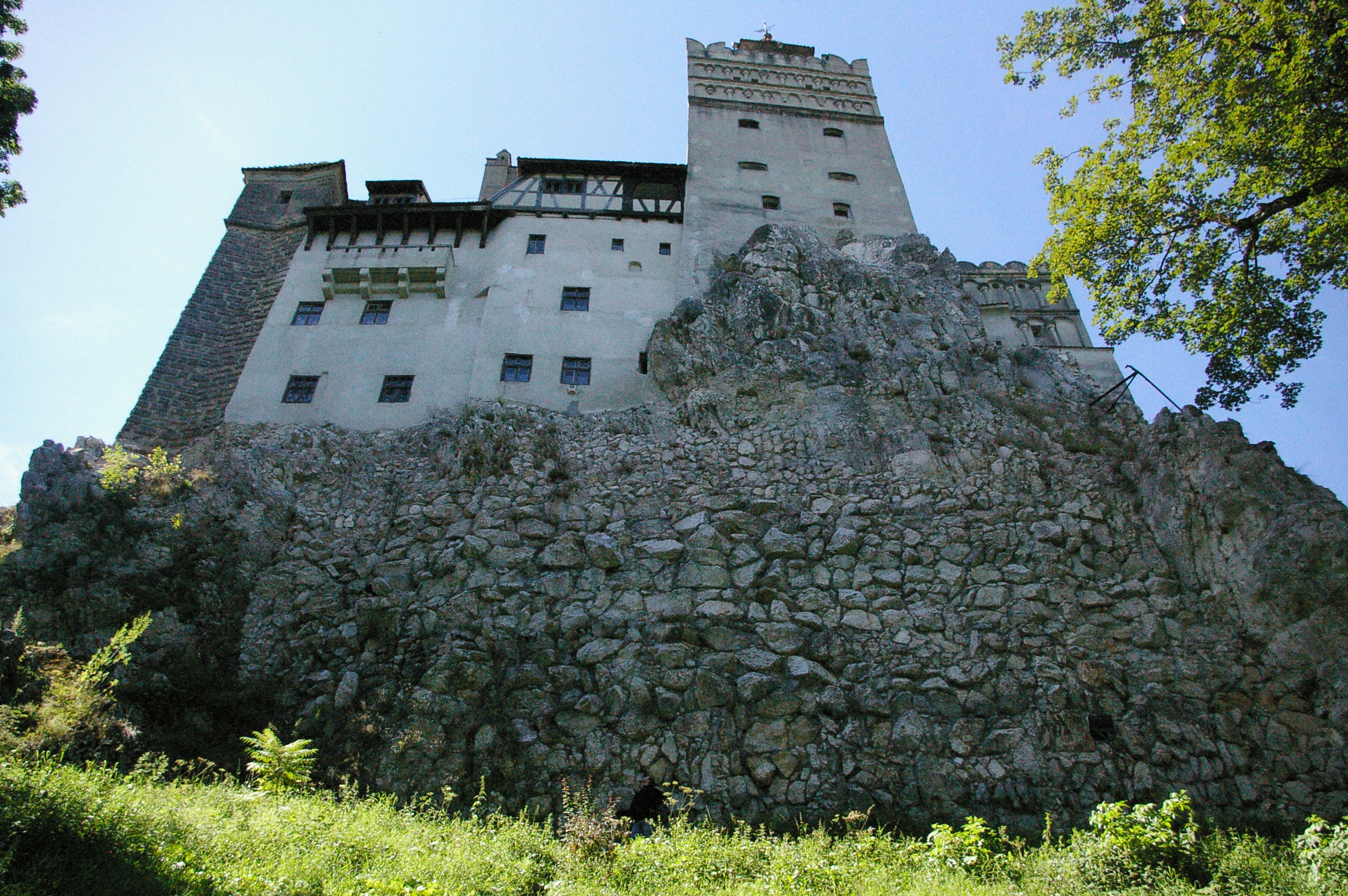
Southern front from the foot of the cliff

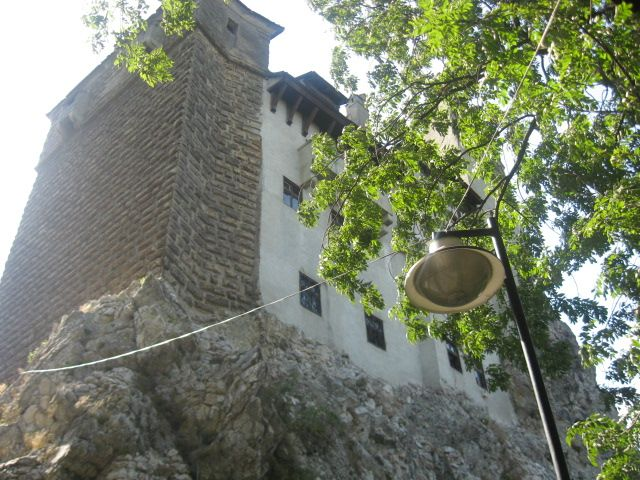
The eastern shield wall, view from the main walkway

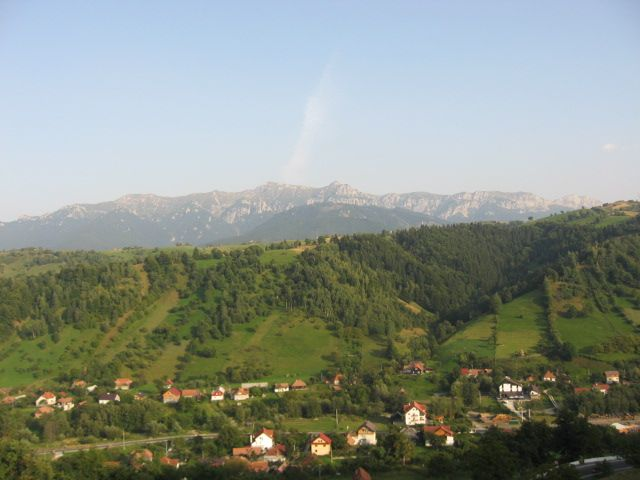
View towards Piatra Craiului from an upstairs balcony

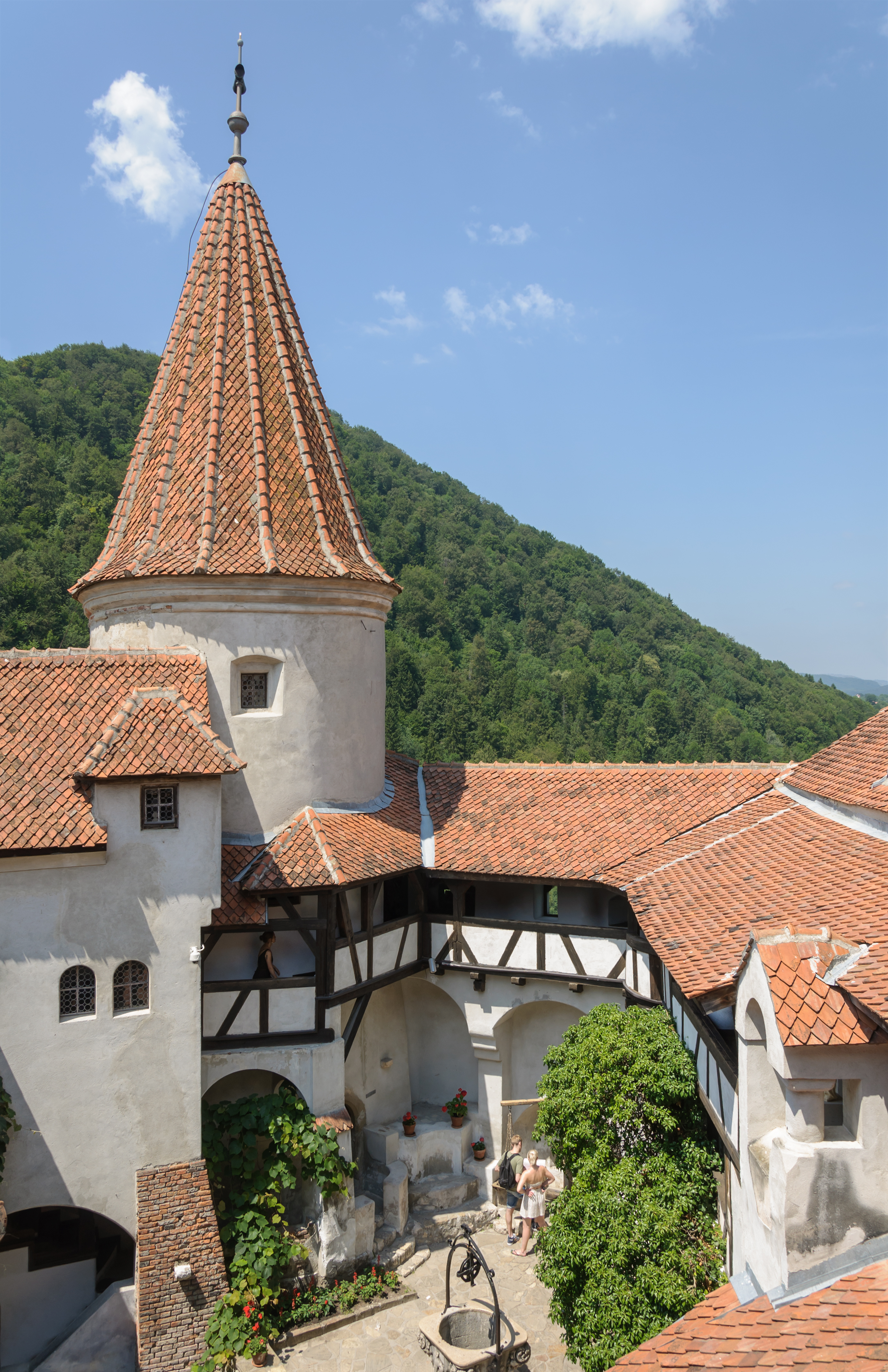
The courtyard, looking west

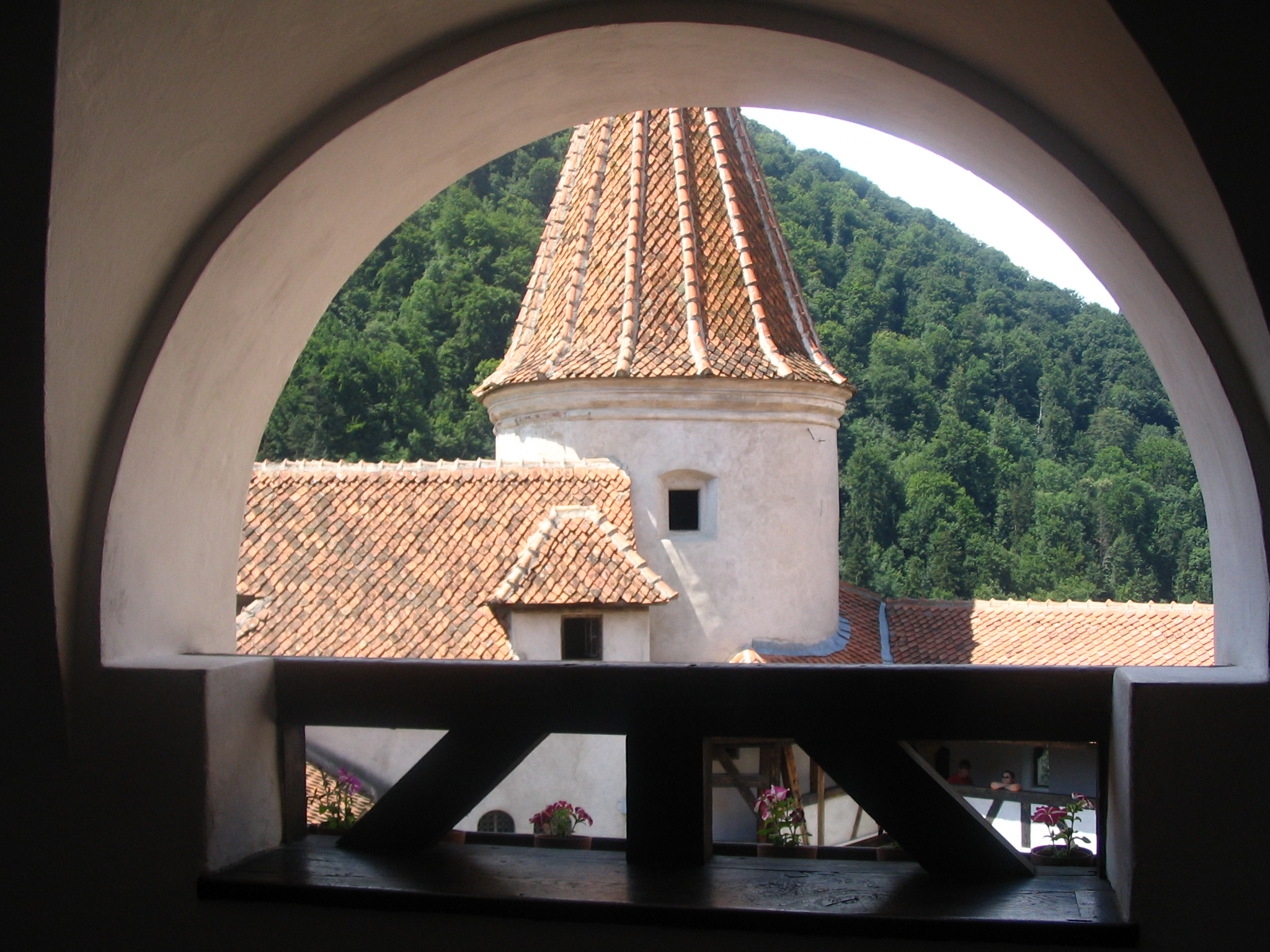
Western tower, seen from inside

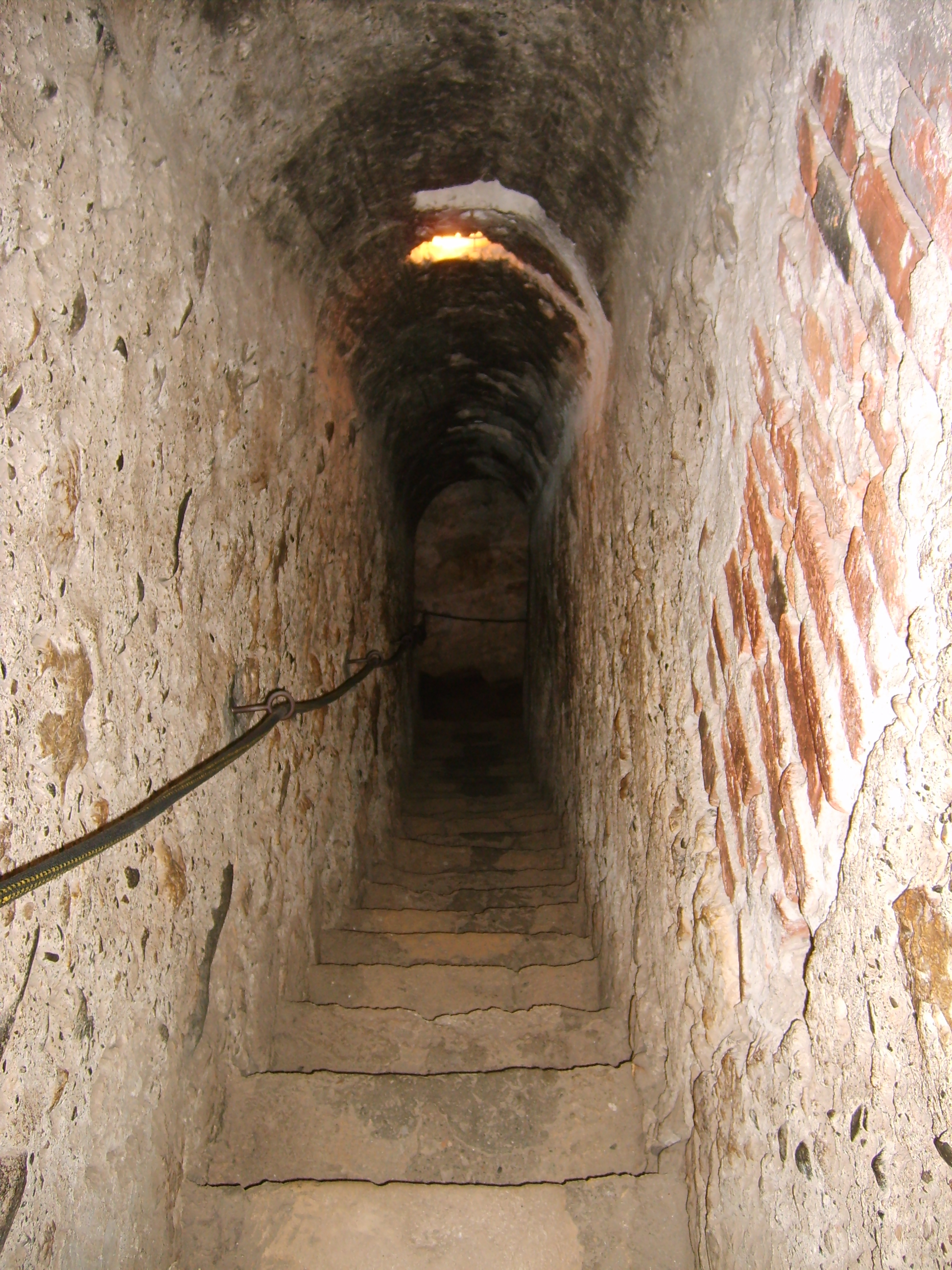
Secret passage connecting the first and third floors

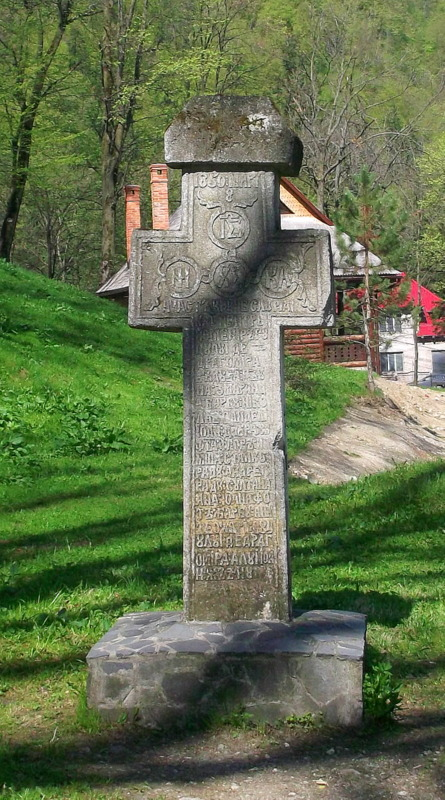
19th-century stone cross placed in the park

== See also ==
- Castles in Romania
  - Poenari Castle, an authentic Vlad the Impaler castle ruin
  - Peleș Castle
  - Corvin Castle
- Tourism in Romania
- Seven Wonders of Romania
- Brașov County
