= Iñaki Anasagasti =

Venezuelan-Spanish politician

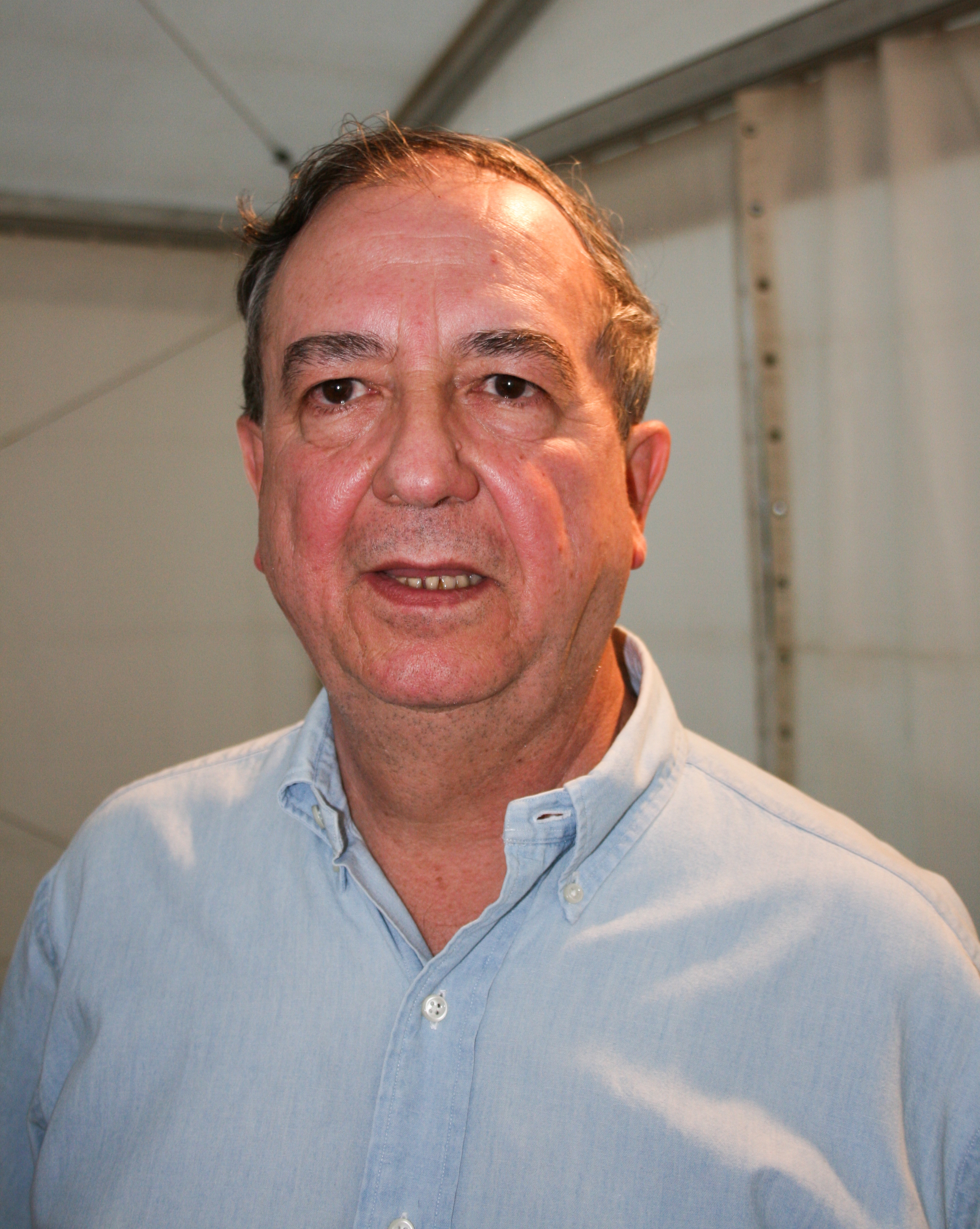
Anasagasti in 2010

Iñaki Anasagasti (born 16 November 1947) is a Venezuelan-Spanish politician, belonging to the Basque Nationalist Party.

== Biography ==
Anasagasti was born to exiled Spanish parents in Cumaná, Venezuela. His father was a Basque nationalist and a member of the Basque Nationalist Party (PNV), who had fled the country after the Spanish Civil War. In the mid-1950s, his parents decided that Iñaki and his three brothers had to be educated in the Basque Country of Spain, so sent their children to return to San Sebastián to the care of their grandparents. Iñaki studied at the Sociedad de María, San Sebastián from 1955 to 1961 and from this date to 1965 in Santiago Apóstol of Bilbao.

== Venezuela ==
In 1965 his father died and he returned to Venezuela, where he remained for ten years. He became acquainted with the exiled Basque Nationalist Party in Caracas, and studied Journalism and Sociology at the Universidad Católica Andres Bello run by Jesuits. There he met his future wife Maria Esther Solabarrieta, whom he married in 1976. In the early 1970s he was named president of Euzko Gaztedi Indarra a youth wing of the EGI, in the Basque center of Caracas. He became involved with Radio Euzkadi, broadcast daily in Venezuela and collaborated in the resistance magazine Gudari.

== Return to Spain ==
In August 1975, he returned again to San Sebastián and directed the publication of the PNV, Euzkadi. He was detained on 1 April 1976 with Joseba Goikoetxea (assassinated later by ETA) and Bingen Zubiri, and by order of the Minister of the Interior Manuel Fraga, he was jailed for three days. He was chosen in 1977 as a member of the regional council of the PNV in Biscay (Bizkai Buru Batzar), a position that he occupied until 1980 under the Presidency of Carlos Garaikoetxea.

== Cortes Generales ==
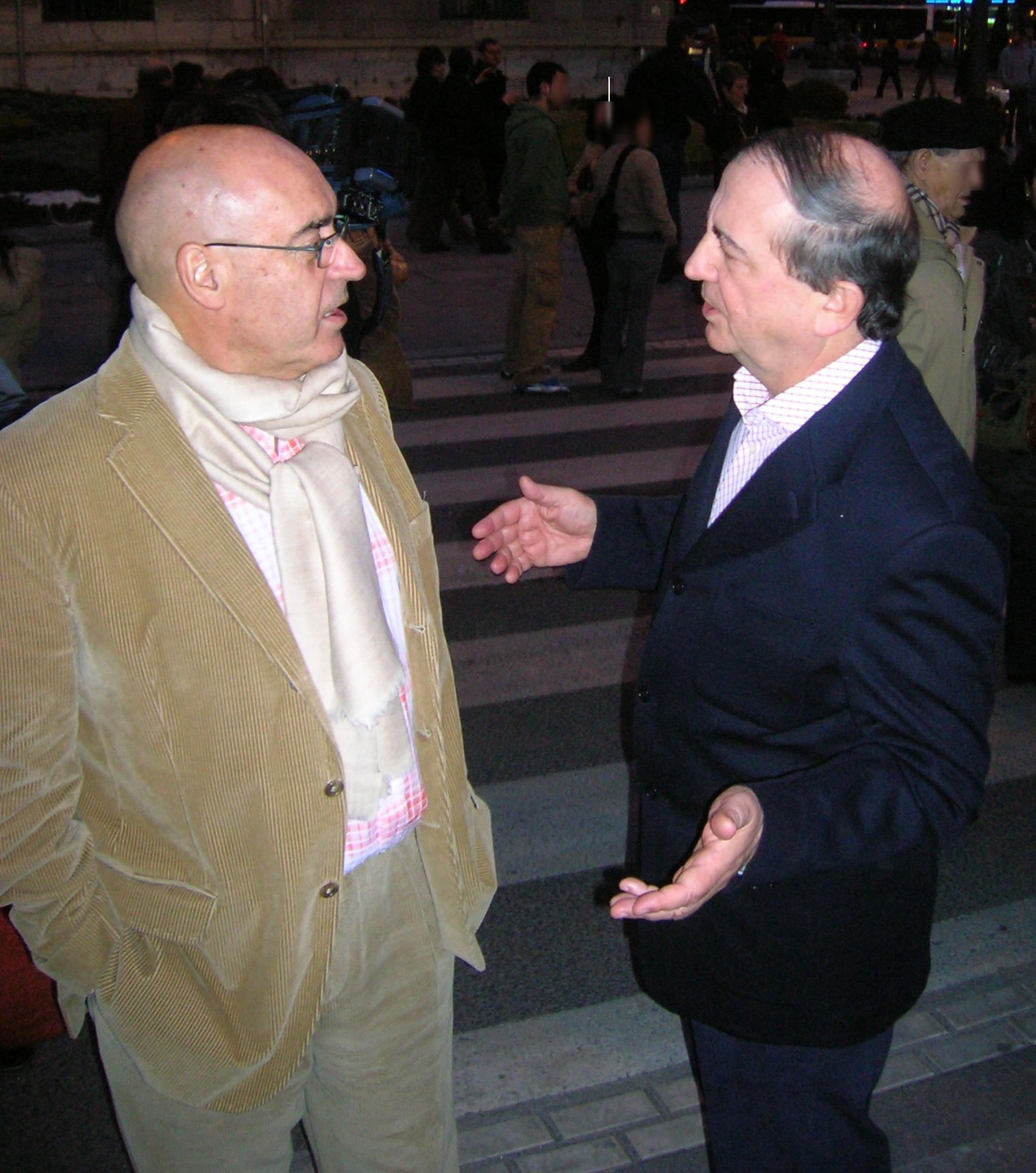
Anasagasti (right) and Javier Rojo, President of the Senate

In 1980 he was elected to the Basque Parliament where he was an MP between 1980 and 1986. In 1986 he was elected to the Congress of deputies, representing Vizcaya, where he served until 2004 as leader for the Basque Nationalist Parliament Group. In 2004 he was elected senator for Vizcaya, and reelected in 2008, at the Senate he was elected to the Bureau of the Senate in the 8th legislature, in the position of First Secretary.

In 2012 he proposed the idea of creating a Catalan-Basque-Navarrese monarchy around Archduke Domingo de Habsburgo-Borbón, the Habsburg-Bourbon Carlist-Carloctavismo claimant to the Spanish throne.

== See also ==
- Carlism
