= Princess Ileana of Romania =

Romanian royal

Princess Ileana
- Archduchess Ileana of Austria; Mother Alexandra
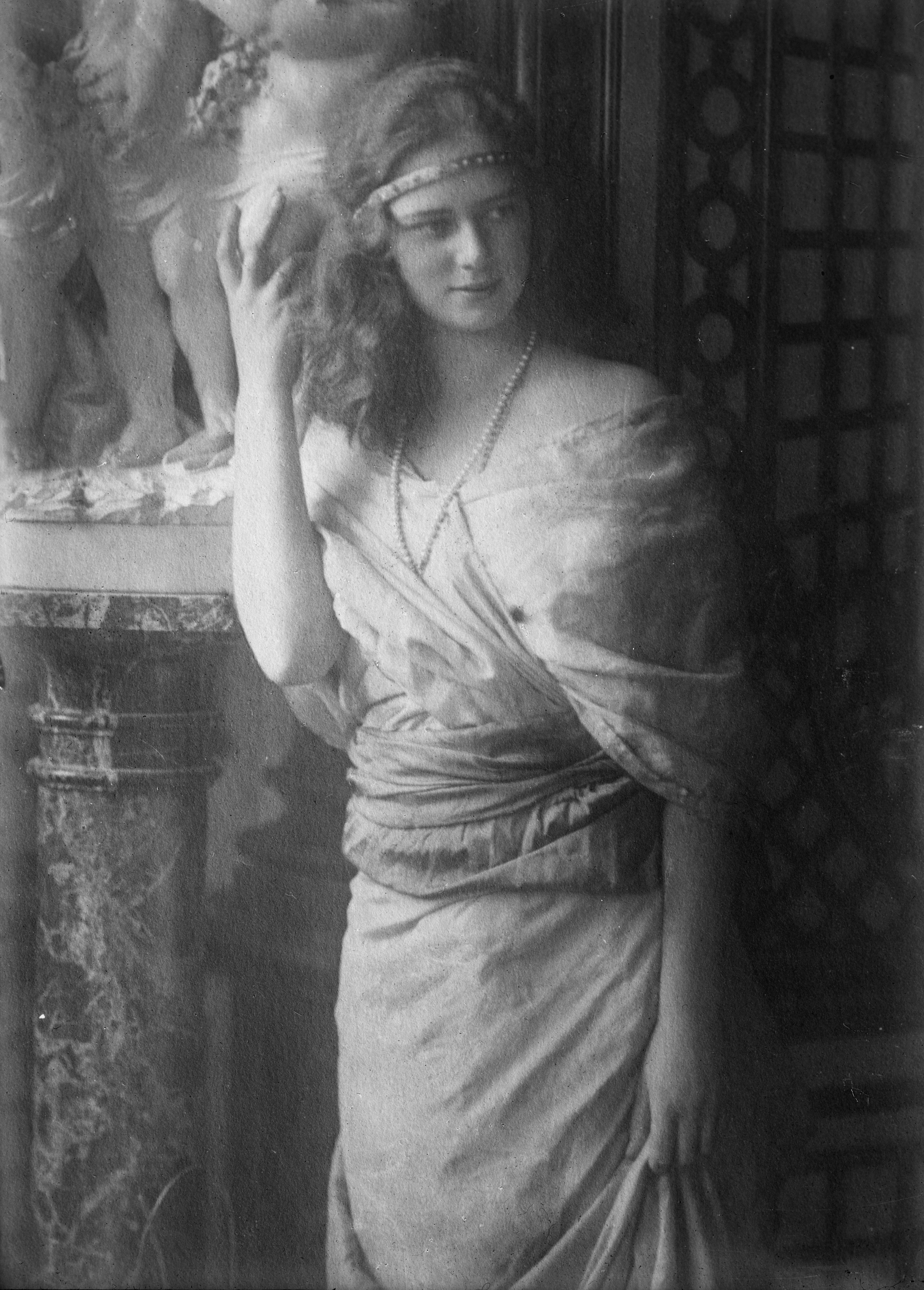
- Photograph, late 1920s
- Born: 5 January 1909; Cotroceni Palace, Bucharest, Kingdom of Romania
- Died: 21 January 1991 (aged 82); Youngstown, Ohio, U.S.
- Burial: Ellwood City, Pennsylvania , U.S.
- Spouse: Archduke Anton of Austria (m. 1931; div. 1954) Dr. Stefan Nikolas Issarescu (m. 1954; div. 1965)
- Issue: Archduke Stefan; Archduchess Maria Ileana; Archduchess Alexandra; Archduke Dominic; Archduchess Maria Magdalena; Archduchess Elisabeth
- House: Hohenzollern-Sigmaringen
- Father: Ferdinand I of Romania (officially); Barbu Știrbey (rumored)
- Mother: Marie of Edinburgh

Princess Ileana of Romania, also known as Mother Alexandra (5 January 1909 – 21 January 1991), was the youngest daughter of King Ferdinand I of Romania and his consort, Queen Marie. She was a great-granddaughter of Emperor Alexander II of Russia, Queen Maria II of Portugal, and Queen Victoria of the United Kingdom. She was born as Her Royal Highness Princess Ileana of Romania, Princess of Hohenzollern-Sigmaringen.

== Birth and early life ==
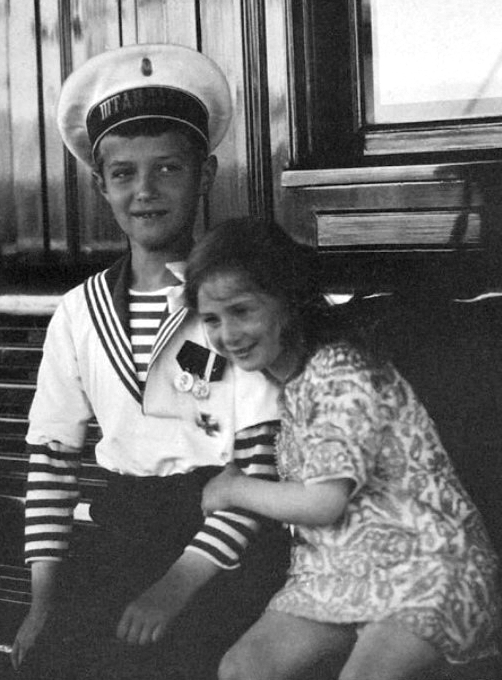
Princess Ileana of Romania with her second cousin, Tsesarevich Alexei of Russia

Ileana was born in Bucharest on 5 January 1909, the youngest daughter of Queen Marie of Romania and King Ferdinand I of Romania. Ileana had four older siblings: Carol, Elisabeth (later Queen of Greece), Princess Maria (later Queen of Yugoslavia), and Nicholas; and a younger brother Mircea.

Her mother wrote in her memoirs:

Ileana from her earliest infancy had an earnestness about her which the other four did not possess. Her large dark blue eyes looked at you with deep inquiry and the child seemed to understand your every emotion with almost uncanny lucidity.

Ileana was naturally well-behaved; Ileana, as is so seldom the case, was born with the law within her, it was never necessary to teach Ileana the difference between right and wrong; Ileana knew. But this did not make of her a prig, she was a gay, happy child, full of life and high spirits, and when Mircea appeared early in the year 1913, Ileana loved him with motherly ardour and Mircea adored Ileana more than anyone on this earth; more than his mother, more than his nurse.

== Girl Guiding ==
Before her marriage, Ileana was the organizer and Chief of the Romanian Girl Guide Movement.

Later, Princess Ileana was involved in Guiding in Austria and served as president of the Austrian Girl Guides from 1935 until Girl Guiding and Scouting were banned in 1938 after the Anschluss.

== Other achievements ==
Ileana was the organizer of the Girl Reserves of the Red Cross, and of the first school of Social Work in Romania.

She was an avid sailor: she earned her navigator's papers, and she owned and sailed the "Isprava" for many years.

== Before King Michael's abdication ==
=== Marriage ===
In 1919, Ileana and her sisters Elisabeta and Maria accompanied their mother to Paris at the Peace Conference. The sovereign hoped that during her stay there she could find suitable husbands for her two elder daughters, especially Elisabeta, already aged twenty-five. After a few months in France, the Queen and her daughters decided to return to Romania in early 1920. On the way back, they made a brief stop in Switzerland, where they found the Greek royal family, who lived in exile since the deposition of King Constantine I during the Great War.

The king's eldest son, Crown Prince and future King George II of Greece asked for Elisabeta's hand in marriage. The Swiss visit also resulted in the engagement of Ileana's eldest brother Crown Prince Carol to Princess Helen of Greece. Both couples married a year later.

In 1922, Queen Marie successfully arranged the marriage of her next daughter Maria to the King of Yugoslavia.

From then on Marie's focus was on finding her last unmarried daughter a suitable partner. An engagement to the Crown Prince of Italy was reported, but denied by Marie, and rumors of a marriage to the Tsar of Bulgaria were debunked by its royal court. In 1930, Ileana was briefly engaged to Count Alexander of Hochberg. Queen Marie favored the match, being pleased by the English blood and wealth of Alexander's family. The engagement was broken, however, when Alexander's homosexuality came to light.

In Sinaia on 26 July 1931, Ileana married the Archduke Anton of Austria, Prince of Tuscany at Peles Castle, Sinaia. This marriage was encouraged by Ileana's brother, King Carol II, who was jealous of Ileana's popularity in Romania and wanted to get her out of the country. After the wedding, Carol claimed that the Romanian people would never tolerate a Habsburg living on Romanian soil, and on these grounds refused Ileana and Anton permission to live in Romania.

After her husband was conscripted into the Luftwaffe, Ileana established a hospital for wounded Romanian soldiers at their castle, Sonnburg, outside Vienna, Austria. She was assisted in this task by her friend Sheila Kaul. In 1944, she and the children moved back to Romania, where they lived at Bran Castle, near Brasov. Archduke Anton joined them but was placed under house arrest by the Red Army. Ileana established and worked in another hospital in Bran village, which she named "The Hospital of the Queen's Heart" in memory of her beloved mother, Queen Marie of Romania.

== After exile ==
After Michael I of Romania abdicated, Ileana and her family were exiled from the newly Communist Romania. They escaped by train to the Russian sector of Vienna, at that time divided into three sectors. After that they settled in Switzerland, then moved to Argentina and in 1950, she and the children moved to the United States, where she bought a house in Newton, Massachusetts.

The years from 1950 to 1961 were spent lecturing against communism, working with the Romanian Orthodox Church in the United States, writing two books: I Live Again, a memoir of her last years in Romania, and Hospital of the Queen's Heart, describing the establishment and running of the hospital.

Ileana and Anton officially divorced on 29 May 1954. On 19 June 1954 in Newton, Massachusetts, she married Dr. Stefan Nikolas Issarescu. Her second marriage ended in divorce (without issue) in 1965.

In 1961, Ileana entered the Orthodox Monastery of Our Lady of All Protection/ Notre Dame de Toute Protection, in Bussy-en-Othe, France. On her tonsuring as a monastic, in 1967, Sister Ileana was given the name Mother Alexandra. She moved back to the United States and founded the Orthodox Monastery of the Transfiguration in Ellwood City, Pennsylvania, the first English language Orthodox monastery in North America. She was the third female descendant of Queen Victoria to become a Mother Superior in a convent of her own foundation along with Princess Alice of Battenberg and Princess Elisabeth of Hesse. She served as abbess until her retirement in 1981, remaining at the monastery until her death.

She visited Romania again in 1990, at the age of 81, in the company of her daughter, Sandi.

On 3–5 January 1991, she suffered a broken hip in a fall on the evening before her eighty-second birthday, and while in hospital, suffered two major heart attacks. She died four days after the foundations had been laid for the expansion of the monastery. At the time of her death, Ileana was the last surviving child of King Ferdinand I of Romania and Queen Marie of Romania.

== Archives ==
Princess Ileana's personal papers (including family correspondence and photographs) are preserved in the "Queen Marie of Romania Papers" collection in the library of Kent State University (Kent, Ohio, US), and also in the "Mother Alexandra Papers" collection in the Hoover Institution Archives (Stanford, California, US). In addition, Ileana's correspondence with the Romanian diplomat George I. Duca between 1924 and 1985 is preserved in the "George I. Duca Papers" collection in the Hoover Institution Archives (Stanford, California, US).

== Family ==
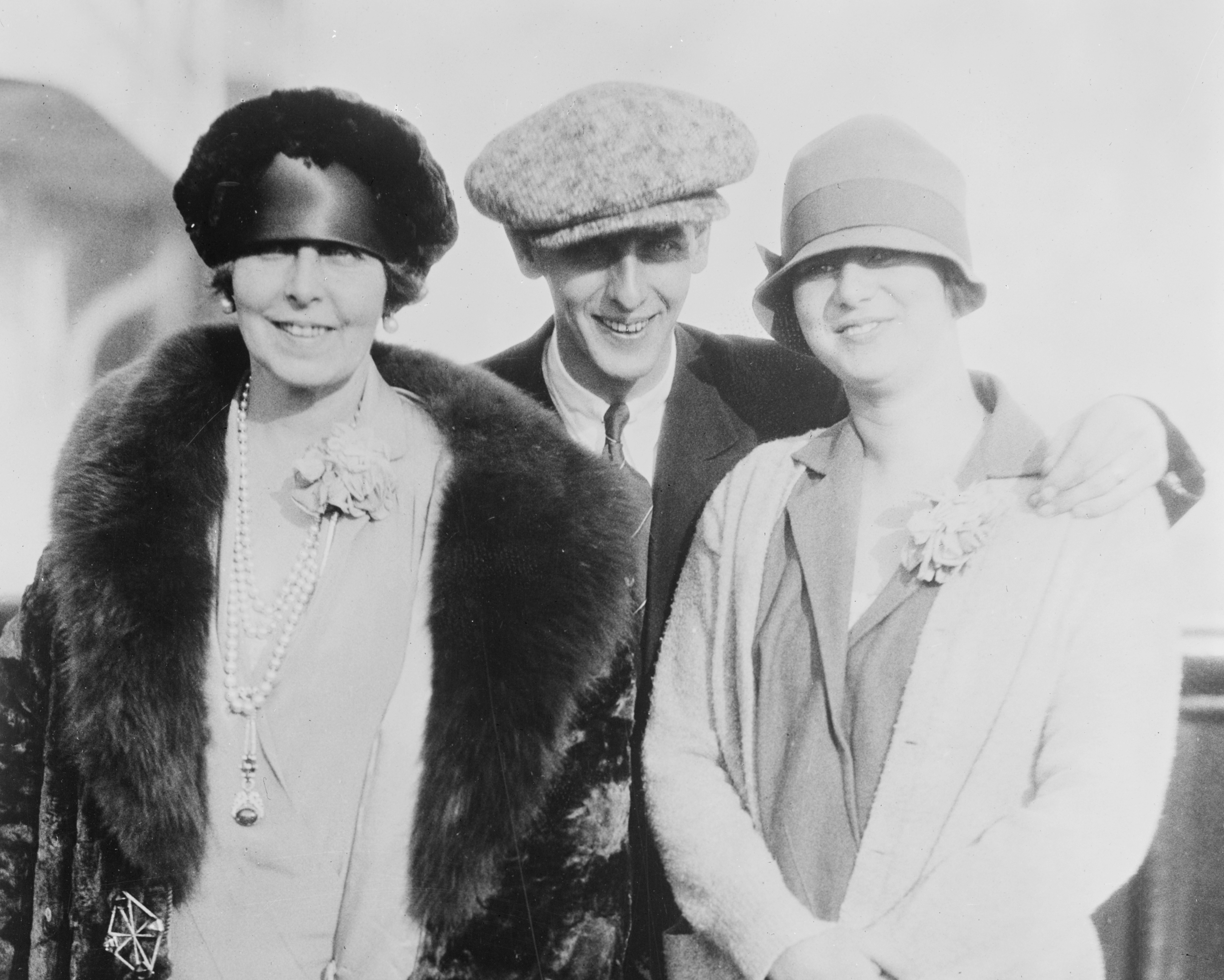
Queen Marie of Romania (left), Prince Nicolae of Romania and Princess Ileana of Romania aboard the SS Leviathan on 27 October 1926

=== Issue ===
Ileana and Anton had six children; they were raised in the Catholic faith of her husband and of the country:

- Archduke Stefan of Austria, Prince of Tuscany (5 August 1932 – 12 November 1998); married morganatically Mary Jerrine Soper (19 June 1931 – 14 July 2015), and had five children, who received in 1990 the title of Count/Countess von Habsburg for them and their descendants in the male line:
  - Christopher Habsburg-Lothringen (born 26 January 1957).
  - Ileana Habsburg-Lothringen (born 4 January 1958).
  - Peter Habsburg-Lothringen (born 19 February 1959).
  - Constanza Habsburg-Lothringen (born 2 October 1960)
  - Anton Habsburg-Lothringen (born 7 November 1964)
- Archduchess Maria Ileana of Austria, Princess of Tuscany (Minola) (18 December 1933 – 11 January 1959); married Count Jaroslaw Kottulinsky, Baron von Kottulin (3 January 1917 – 11 January 1959) (both were killed in the crash of Lufthansa Flight 502), and had one daughter:
  - Countess Maria Ileana Kottulinska, Baroness von Kottulin (Mino) (25 August 1958 – 13 October 2007); married Jonkheer Noel van Innis (born 15 December 1939) on 10 October 1997.
- Archduchess Alexandra of Austria, Princess of Tuscany (Sandi) (21 May 1935 – 13 October 1997); married Duke Eugen Eberhard of Württemberg (2 November 1930 – 26 July 2022), son of Princess Nadezhda of Bulgaria on 3 September 1962 and had no issue. They divorced in 1972 and she married Victor, Baron von Baillou (27 June 1931 - 10 November 2023) on 22 August 1973.
  - Son von Baillou (stillborn 17 March 1975).
- Archduke Dominic of Austria, Prince of Tuscany (Niki) (born 4 July 1937), inheritor of Bran Castle; married Engel von Voss (31 March 1937 – 27 September 2000) on 11 June 1960, and had two sons. He divorced her in 1999 and married Emmanuella Mlynarski (born 14 January 1948) on 14 August 1999.
  - Count Sandor von Habsburg (born 13 February 1965); married Priska Vilcsek (born 18 March 1959) on 15 May 2000 and were divorced on 22 December 2009. They had one son. He remarried Herta Öfferl on 24 December 2010.
    - Count Constantin von Habsburg (born 11 July 2000)
  - Count Gregor von Habsburg (born 20 November 1968); married Jacquelyn Frisco (born 17 November 1965) on 13 August 2011.
- Archduchess Maria Magdalena of Austria, Princess of Tuscany (Magi) (2 October 1939 – 18 August 2021); married Hans Ulrich, Baron von Holzhausen (1 September 1929 – 2 September 2024) on 27 August 1959, and had three children:
  - Johann Friedrich Anton, Baron von Holzhausen (born 29 July 1960 in Salzburg, Austria), married Brunilda Castejón-Schneider (born 14 July 1962 in Madrid, Spain) on 23 September 2001 in Wartberg, Germany, and had one son:
    - Laurenz, Baron von Holzhausen (born 21 June 2001 in Vienna, Austria)
  - Georg Ferdinand, Baron von Holzhausen (born 16 February 1962 in Salzburg, Austria), married Elena, Countess von und zu Hoensbroech (born 1 May 1965) on 30 April 1993 in Vienna, Austria, and had three sons:
    - Alexander von Holzhausen (born 28 November 1994 in Vienna, Austria)
    - Tassilo von Holzhausen (born 4 May 1997 in Vienna, Austria)
    - Clemens von Holzhausen (born 26 April 2003 in Vienna, Austria)
  - Alexandra Maria, Baroness von Holzhausen (born 22 January 1963 in Salzburg, Austria), married Christian Ferch (born 4 August 1959 in Salzburg, Austria) on 2 July 1985 in Salzburg, Austria, and had four children:
    - Ferdinand Georg Botho Ferch (born 17 October 1986 in Salzburg, Austria)
    - Leopold Anton David Ferch (born 18 August 1988 in Gmunden, Austria)
    - Benedikt Peter Nikolaus Ferch (born 22 March 1993 in Munich, Germany)
    - Elisabeth Patricia Katharina Ferch (born 23 February 1995 in Munich, Germany)
- Archduchess Elisabeth of Austria, Princess of Tuscany (Herzi) (15 January 1942 – 2 January 2019), married Dr. Friedrich Josef Sandhofer (born 1 August 1934 in Salzburg, Austria) on 3 August 1964 in Mondsee, Austria, and had four children:
  - Anton Dominic Sandhofer (born 26 October 1966 in Salzburg, Austria), married Katarzyna Marta Wojkowska (born 23 November 1962 in Warsaw, Poland) on 29 May 1983, and had one son:
    - Dominik Alexander Sandhofer (born 7 January 1994 in Innsbruck, Austria)
  - Margareta Elisabeth Sandhofer (born 10 September 1968 in Innsbruck, Austria), married Ernst Helmut Klaus Lux (born 13 September 1954 in Graz, Austria) on 20 June 1992, and had two sons:
    - Maurito Maria Ernst Lux (born 29 April 1999 in Vienna, Austria)
    - Dorian Augustinius Maria Lux (born 12 May 2001 in Vienna, Austria)
  - Andrea Alexandra Sandhofer (born 13 December 1969 in Innsbruck, Austria), married Jörg Michael Zarbl (born 25 September 1970 in Vienna, Austria) on 30 August 1996 and had two sons:
    - Ferdinand Hans Friedrich Konstantin Maria Zarbl (born 8 December 1996 in Salzburg, Austria)
    - Benedikt Bonifatius Maria Manfred Rainer Zarbl (born 19 February 1999)
  - Elisabeth Victoria Madgalena Sandhofer (born 16 November 1971 in Innsbruck, Austria), unmarried and without issue.

=== Major family events ===
- In 1954, her marriage to Anton ended in divorce. Later that year, she married Dr. Stefan Nikolas Issarescu in Newton, Massachusetts.
- Eldest son Stefan suffered a debilitating illness in 1961 which required extensive nursing, which his wife and his mother provided.
- Eldest daughter Marie Ileana and her husband were killed in a plane crash in Brazil, along with their unborn second child. They left an infant daughter.
- Son Dominic was awarded retroactive rights to Bran Castle in May 2006 by the Romanian authorities as inheritance from his mother Ileana.

== Award ==
- International Sailing Federation: Navigation Award

== Ranks ==
=== Military ===
- Kingdom of Romania:
  - Romanian Naval Forces:
    - Vice admiral

=== Scouting/Guides ===
==== National ====
  - Romanian Girl Guide Movement:
    - Chief and Organiser
  - Girl Reserves of the Romanian Red Cross:
    - Organiser
  - First School of Social Work in Romania:
    - Founder and Organiser

==== Foreign ====
- Federal State of Austria:
  - Austrian Girl Guides:
    - President
- United Kingdom:
  - Girl Guides:
    - Honorary Member

== Ancestry ==
Ancestors of Princess Ileana of Romania

8. Karl Anton, Prince of Hohenzollern
4. Leopold, Prince of Hohenzollern
9. Princess Josephine of Baden
2. Ferdinand I of Romania
10. Ferdinand II of Portugal
5. Infanta Antónia of Portugal
11. Maria II of Portugal
1. Princess Ileana of Romania
12. Prince Albert of Saxe-Coburg and Gotha
6. Alfred, Duke of Saxe-Coburg and Gotha
13. Victoria of the United Kingdom
3. Princess Marie of Edinburgh
14. Alexander II of Russia
7. Grand Duchess Maria Alexandrovna of Russia
15. Princess Marie of Hesse and by Rhine
