= Santa María de la Cabeza castle =

Colonial castle in Cumaná, Venezuela

- Cumaná, Venezuela
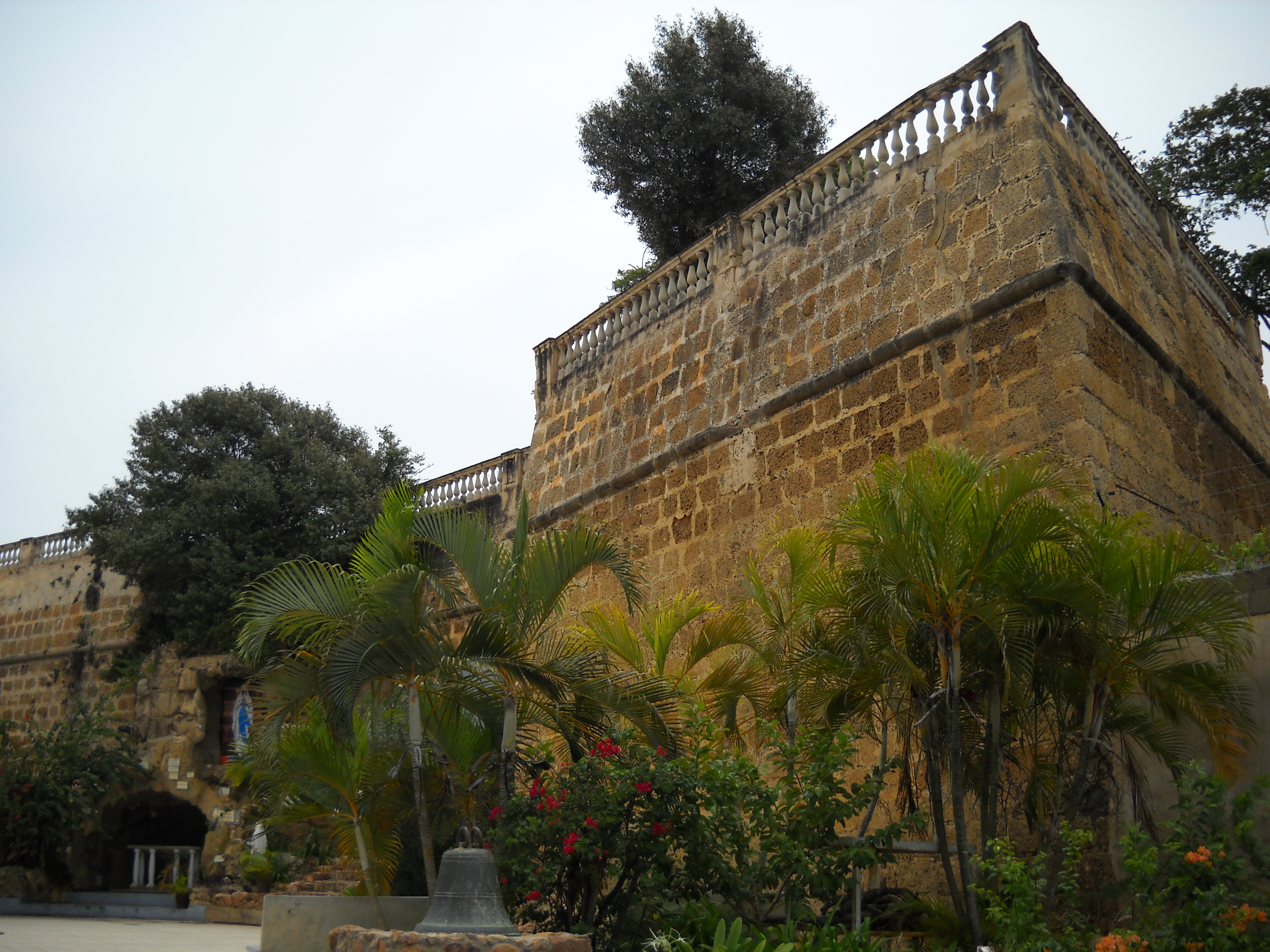
- Outside walls of the Santa María de la Cabeza castle

Site information
- Type: Fortress
- Controlled by: State government
- Open to the public: yes
- Condition: Ruins

Location
- Coordinates: 10.4611°N 64.1742°W

Site history
- Built: c. 1669–1673
- Materials: Margosa limestone

Santa María de la Cabeza castle is a colonial castle built in the seventeenth century by the Spanish monarchy in the center of the city of Cumaná, Venezuela. It was built as a replacement for the San Antonio de la Eminencia castle. Its construction was ordered by Sancho Fernando de Angulo y Sandoval, governor of the Province of Cumaná. The building was designed using the trace italienne style popular during the seventeenth century, with a proportional geometric floor design. Bastions were used as the main defensive elements. The castle housed a garrison of 250 soldiers, and was the seat of government for the province of Cumaná.

Construction began in 1668 when Angulo y Sandoval's predecessor, Juan de Urtarte, wrote a memorandum to the King of Spain stating that the San Antonio de la Eminencia castle was unfit for defense. Several years later (and without proper authorization), Angulo y Sandoval began construction of a fortress that would be more useful for the defense of the city than the two existing fortifications. The castle underwent several renovations to repair damage caused by severe earthquakes. A 1684 quake severely damaged the castle and another in 1929 left the structure in ruins. The castle was declared a cultural and municipal asset in May 2005.

== Description ==
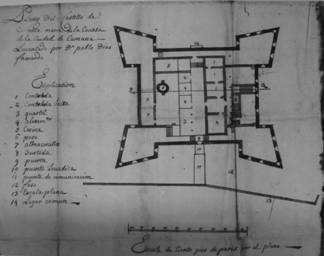
A plan of the Santa María de la Cabeza castle, designed by engineer Pablo Díaz Fajardo in 1737

The Santa María de la Cabeza castle is a fortress built c. 1669–1673 in the city of Cumaná on the orders of Sancho Fernando de Angulo y Sandoval, governor of the Province of Cumaná, as a replacement for the San Antonio de la Eminencia castle. It is located in the center of the city next to St. Agnes Church, about 400 metres (1,300 ft) from the San Antonio castle, on a small hill. The castle is square with bastions (designed by Angulo y Sandoval) at its corners. It has been described as having minor defensive capability.

The castle was built using the trace italienne style popular during the seventeenth century; its floor has a geometric design, and bastions are the main defensive elements. However, unlike other permanent bastioned fortifications, its defensive walls were designed as two sections: the lower part of the wall is vertical (perpendicular to the base) and the upper part, above the string course, is inclined inwards. This design makes the fort unique in Venezuela; in most castles, the lower portion of the walls inclines outwards at the base and the upper parts are vertical (perpendicular to the base).

The primary material used to create the bricks for the castle was margosa limestone (a type of sedimentary rock composed of limestone and clay). The front of the castle is oriented to the east, and there was a ditch around the entire perimeter, including between the castle and the Plaza de Armas (Weapons Square). As of 2008 the building had lost its parapets and shelters, but the main defensive structures and walls have been preserved. The fort housed a garrison of 250 soldiers, and was the residence of the governor of the province of Cumaná.

== Origins ==
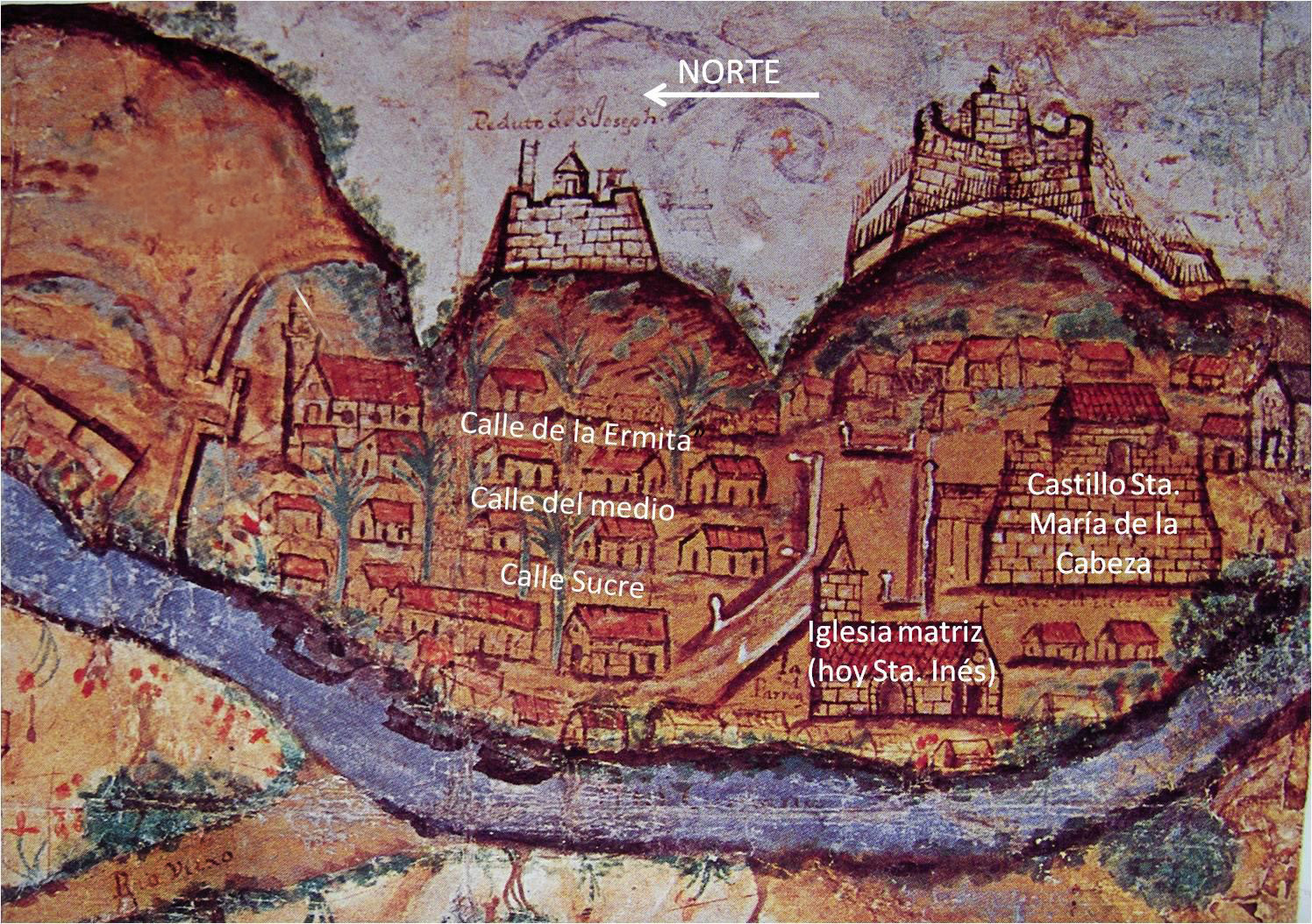
Seventeenth-century depiction of Cumaná by Luis Daniel Beauperthuy Urich

On 22 November 1668, Don Juan de Urtarte (governor of the province from 9 June 1668 to 26 July 1669) wrote a memorandum to the King of Spain stating that Fort Santiago was unfit for defense because of its round shape and its mud and stone construction. Several years later, Governor Don Sancho Fernando de Angulo y Sandoval began—without authorization from the war council—construction of a new fortress with the rationale that the San Antonio de la Eminencia castle did not meet the city's defensive requirements, as it is located on a hilltop far from the city and the coast. The governor claimed that the castle also lacked a suitable water supply and accommodation for soldiers, and thus was unable to resist prolonged sieges.

Unlike his predecessor Urtarte, who requested financing to supply and improve San Antonio, Angulo y Sandoval decided to build a new castle, one better able to defend the city than the two existing fortifications. The resulting fortress was called Santa María de la Cabeza; the governor then requested that the two older structures be demolished.

== History ==
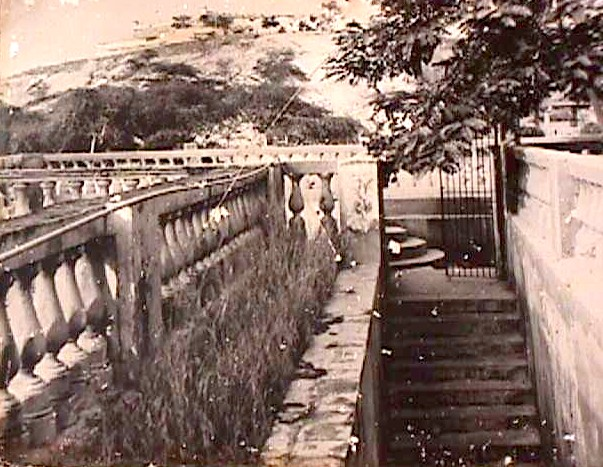
Photo of Santa María de la Cabeza castle taken before the 1929 earthquake

On 4 May 1684 an earthquake devastated the city, severely damaging the Santa María castle. A road linking the Santa María de la Cabeza and San Antonio de la Eminencia castles was mentioned by Agustín Crame in a 1777 proposal for the defense of the city. Crame opposed the idea, but stated that if a road were built it should be a gravel one. The Santa María de la Cabeza castle was partially destroyed in a powerful earthquake felt throughout the state in 1797.

After an earthquake in 1853, the reliquary enclosing an image of Nuestra Señora del Carmen (Our Lady of Mount Carmel), originally situated at the Mount Carmel chapel, was moved to the Santa María de la Cabeza castle, where Santos Berrizbeitia built a new chapel in 1912 to protect the image; it was later moved to St. Agnes Church. The ditch was filled in for construction of the Mount Carmel chapel and the deteriorated parapets were demolished. The original slopes and terraces present on Diaz Fajardo's 1737 map were probably also buried in the process. The chapel in the castle was the final resting place for Berrizbeitia; his remains, originally interred at Holy Trinity Cemetery (which he had built), were exhumed and moved five years after his death.

Between the late eighteenth and early nineteenth centuries, Cumaná experienced an increase in population. The areas around the castles and the Manzanares River became densely populated. New buildings were constructed that were attached to the castle walls, completely closing off the perimeter and making direct access impossible. Another earthquake in 1929 left the structure in ruins and rendered it unusable. The offices of the seat of government for the province of Cumaná were moved elsewhere and the building was abandoned. The castle was declared a Cultural and Municipal Asset in May 2005 by the state Cultural Assets Institute.

== Gallery ==
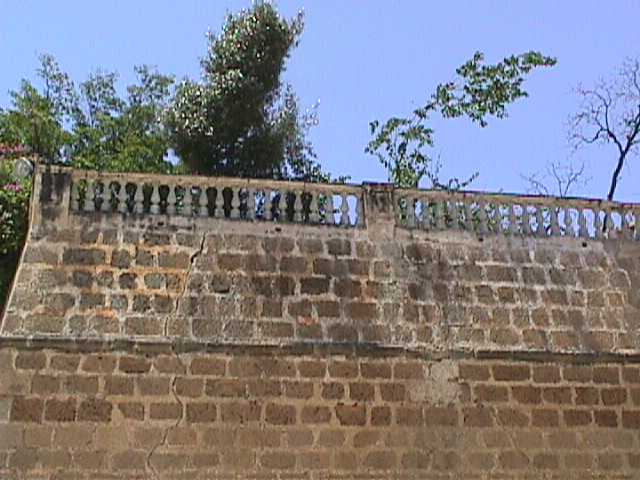

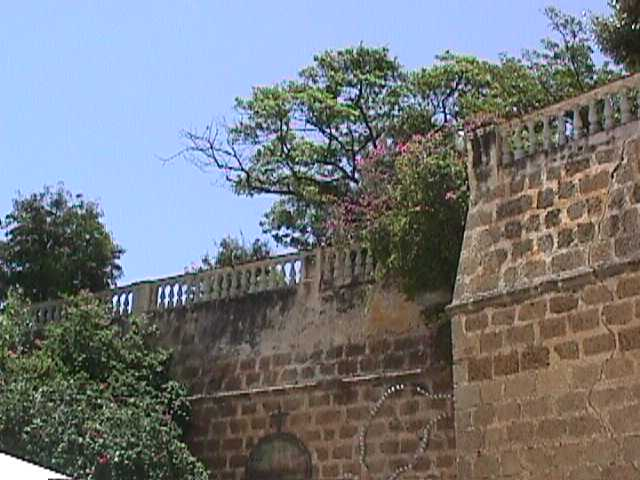

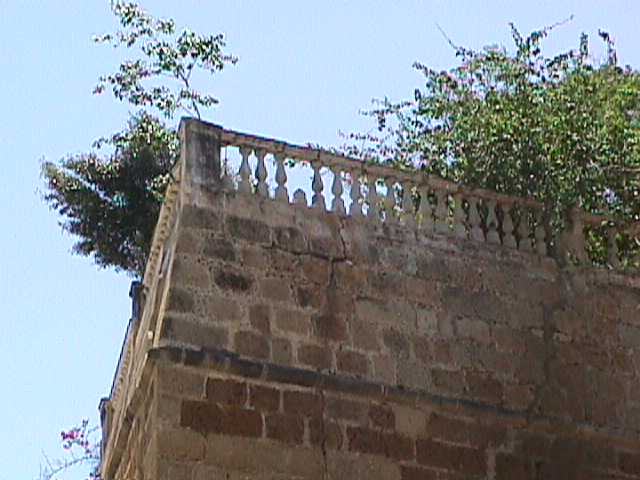

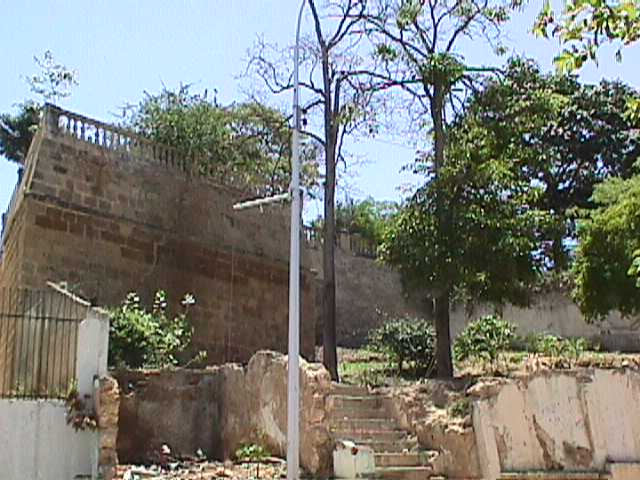
