= Cumaná =

- City
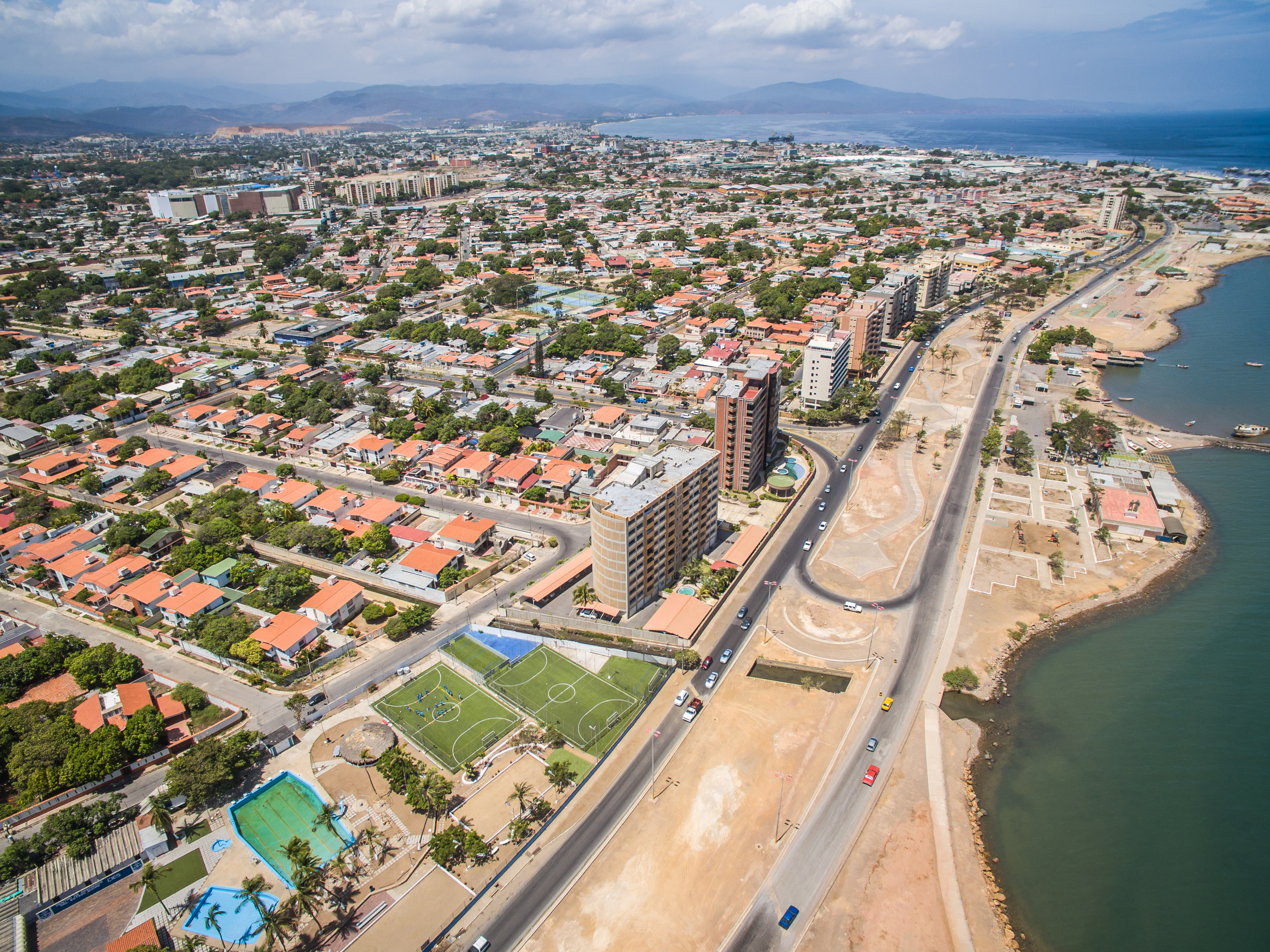
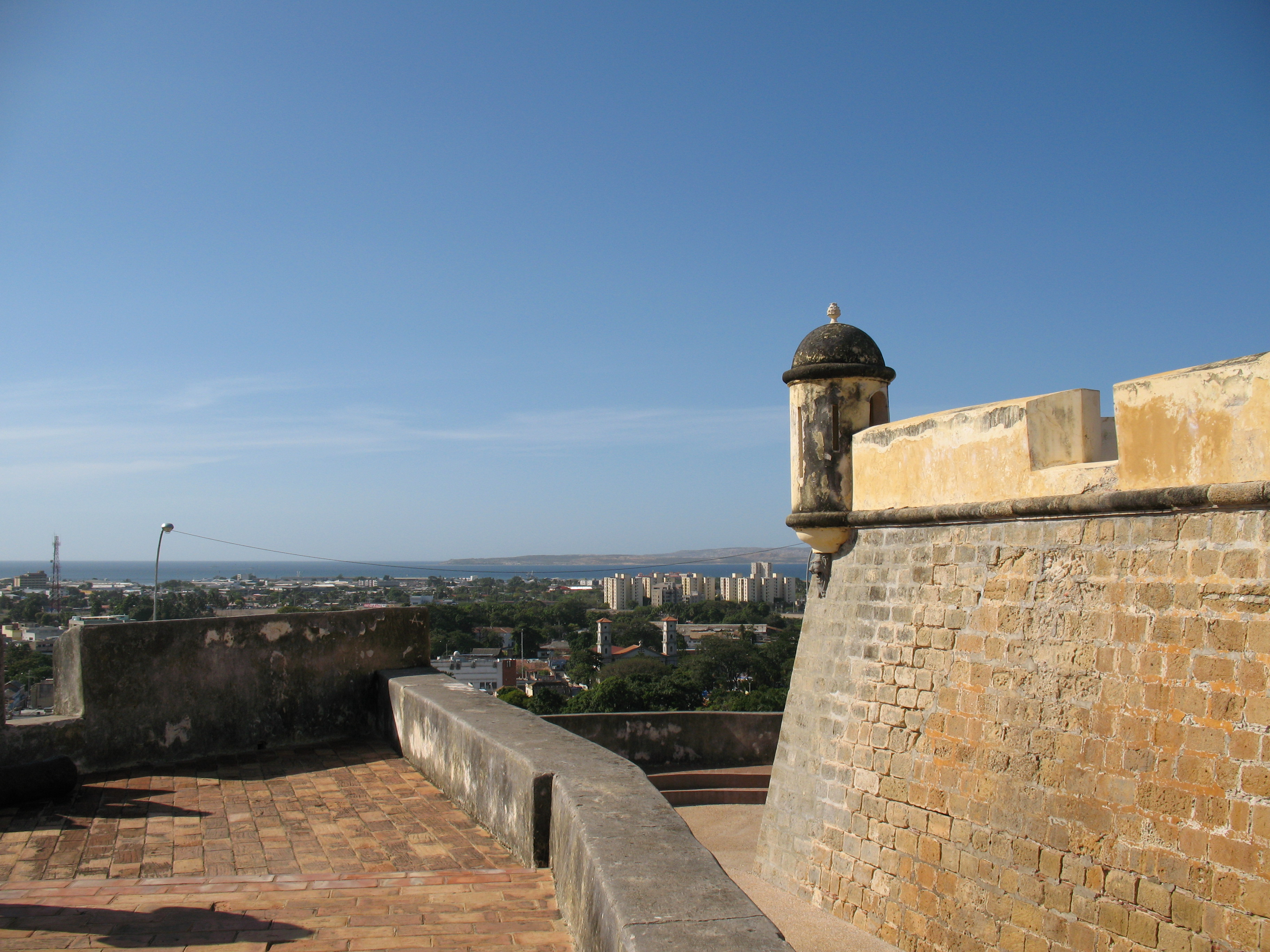
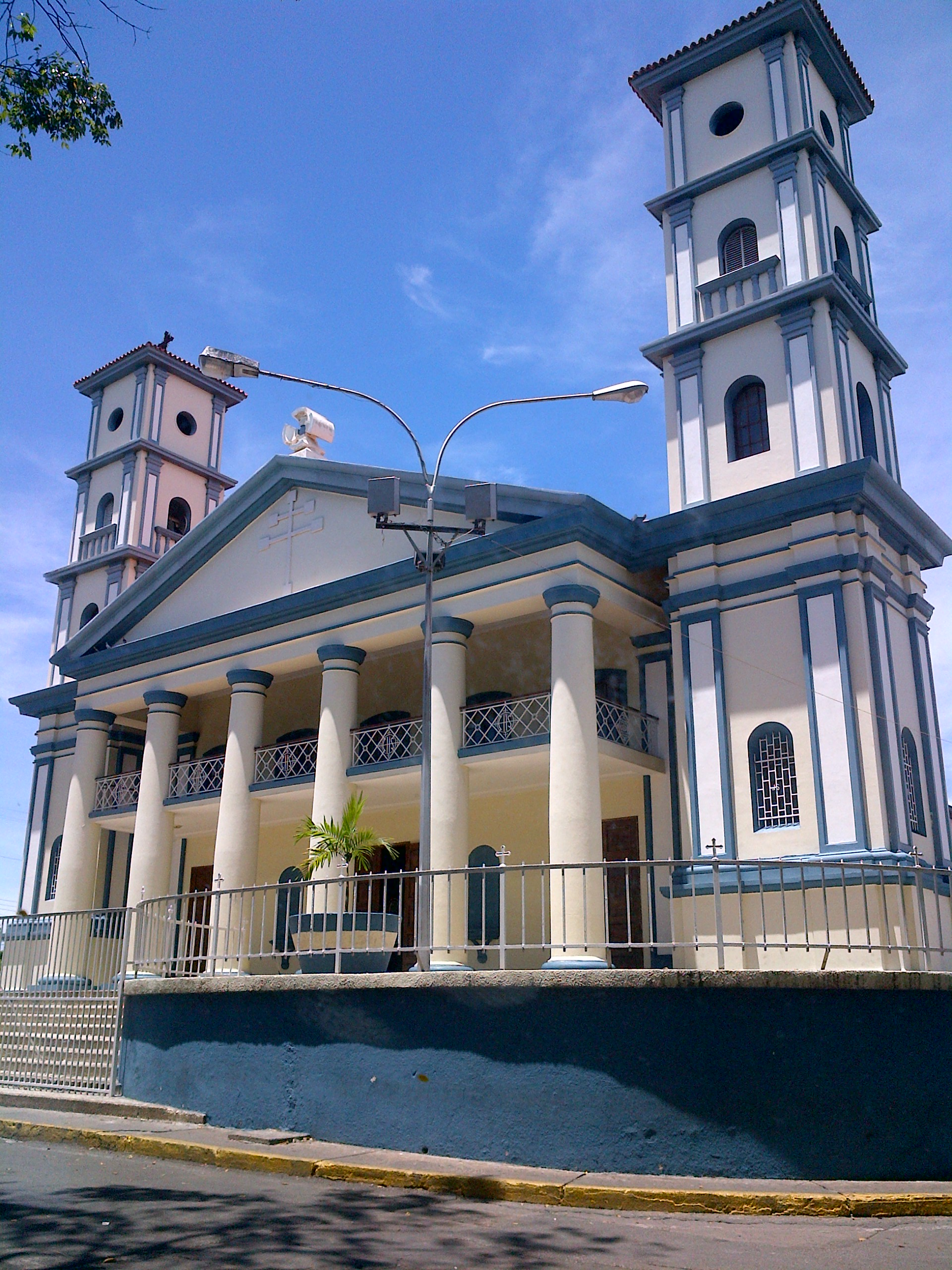
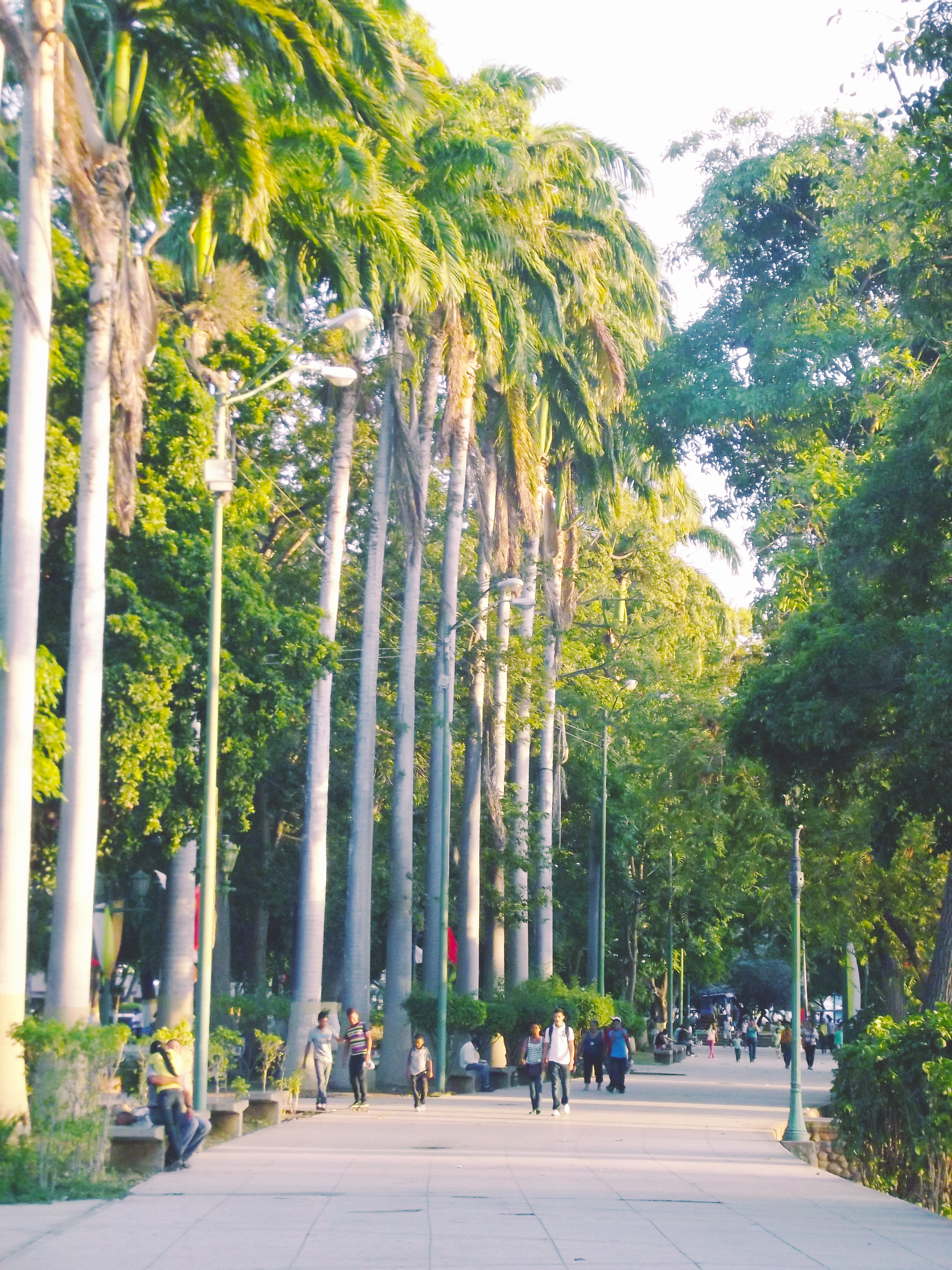
- Top: Cumana Fortless (Castillo San Antonio Eminencie), Second: Cumana Cathedral, Ayacucho Park (Parque del Ayacucho), Bottom: Panorama view of Cumana, Araya Peninsula and Cariaco Bay, from Cumana Fortless (all item from left to right)

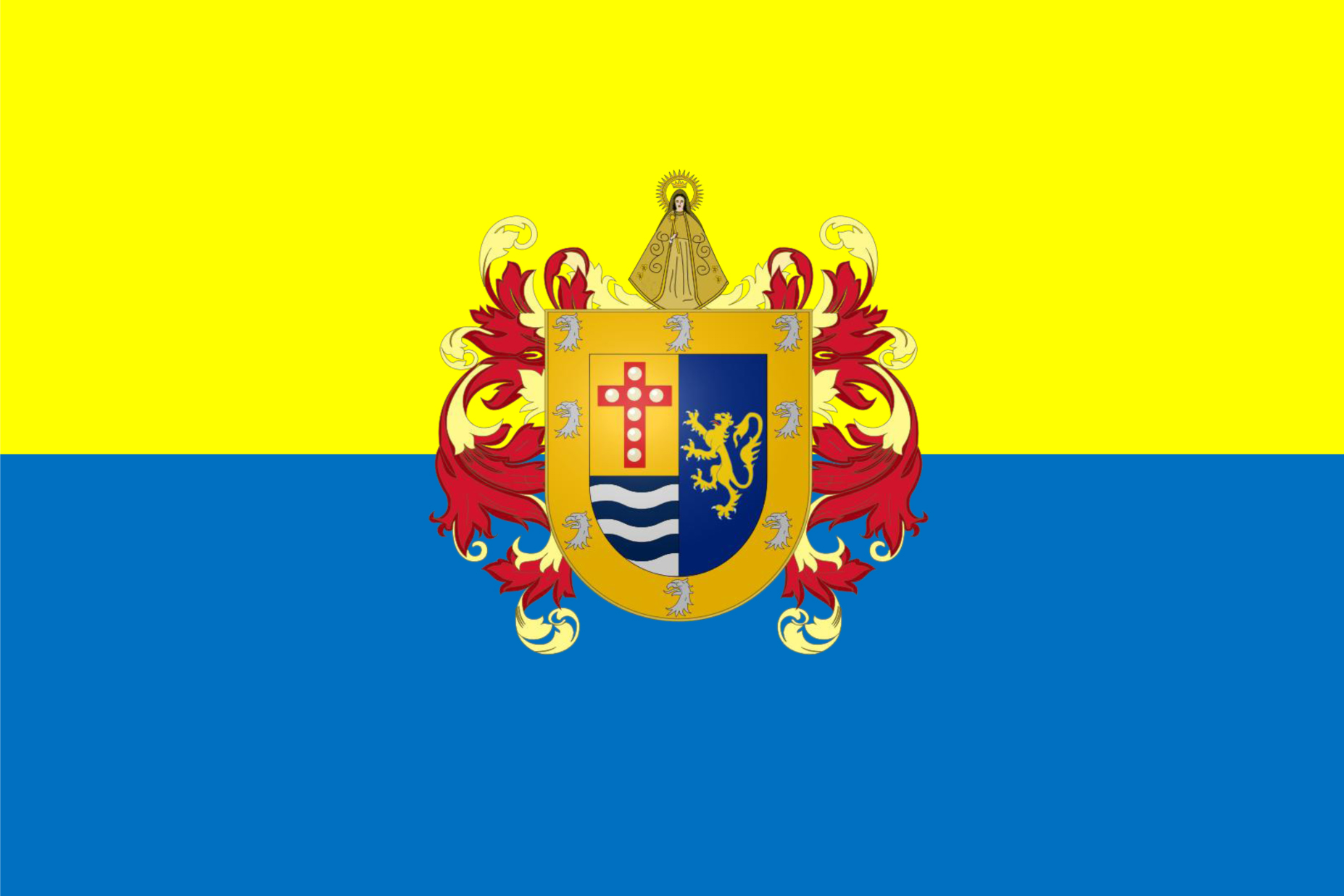
- Flag Coat of arms
- Motto: La tierra donde nace el sol, Primogénita del continente americano (English: "The land where the sun rises, Firstborn of the American Continent")
- Location in Venezuela Cumaná (the Caribbean)
- Coordinates: 10°27′23″N 64°10′3″W
- Country: Venezuela
- State: Sucre
- Municipality: Sucre
- Founded: 1510

Government
  - Type: Mayor–council
  - Mayor: Luis Sifontes (PSUV)

Area
  - City: 598 km^{2} (231 sq mi)
- Elevation: 43 m (141 ft)

Population (2019)
  - City: 384,900
  - Estimate (2026): 464,143
  - Rank: 11th in Venezuela; 10th (Agglomeration)
  - Density: 644/km^{2} (1,670/sq mi)
  - Urban 3: 379,333
  - Metro: 495,442
  - Demonym: Cumanés
- Demonym(s): cumanés (m), cumanesa (f)
- Time zone: UTC−04:00 (VET)
- Postal code: 6101
- Area code: 0293
- Climate: BSh
- Website: www.alcaldiabolivarianadesucre.com (in Spanish)

Cumaná (Spanish pronunciation: [kumaˈna]) is the capital city of Venezuela's Sucre State. It is located 402 kilometres (250 mi) east of Caracas. Cumaná was one of the first cities founded by Spain in the mainland Americas and is the oldest continuously-inhabited Hispanic-established city in South America. Its early history includes several successful counters by the indigenous people of the area who were attempting to prevent Spanish incursion into their land, resulting in the city being refounded several times. The municipality of Sucre, which includes the capital city, Cumaná, had a population of 358,919 at the 2011 Census; the latest estimate (as of mid-2016) is 423,546.

The city is located at the mouth of the Manzanares River on the Caribbean coast, in the northeast of Venezuela. It is home to the first and most important of the five campuses of the Universidad de Oriente, and is a busy maritime port, home to one of the largest tuna fleets in Venezuela. The city is close to Mochima National Park, whose beaches are a popular tourist destination among Venezuelans.

Key heroes of and contributors to the Venezuelan independence movement were born in Cumaná, including Antonio José de Sucre, the 'Gran Mariscal de Ayacucho', a leading general who also served as president of Bolivia and president of Peru. Cumaná is also the birthplace of eminent poets, writers, and politicians like Andrés Eloy Blanco, an important figure in Latin American literature who later rose to the national political scene, as well as José Antonio Ramos Sucre, another distinguished poet and diplomat. Several significant scientists, including Pehr Löfling from Sweden, Alexander von Humboldt from Germany, and Aimé Bonpland from France accomplished experimental works and discoveries while visiting or living in Cumaná in the 18th century. The city is also home to a Toyota plant, which manufactured from 1981 to 2013 the Hilux and Toyota Fortuner.

== History ==
Cumaná was the first settlement founded by Spain in Venezuela and South America, established in 1515 by Franciscan friars, under the name Nueva Toledo, but due to successful attacks by the indigenous people (such as the Cumanagoto people), it had to be refounded several times until Diego Hernández de Serpa's refoundation in 1569 with the name of Cumaná. The birthright of the continent is disputed with the town of Santa Fe (Sucre). Bartolomé de las Casas, attempting a peaceful colonization scheme, was preempted by Gonzalo de Ocampo's 1521 punitive raids against the local indigenous people, in retaliation for the destruction of the Dominican convent at Chiribichi. In 1537, New Andalusia Province was established, with Cumaná as capital (for which the province was also known as the Province of Cumaná).

After Amerindian attacks became less of a threat, the city was on various occasions destroyed by earthquakes. Thus, the oldest part of the city is late 17th and 18th century; almost none of the 16th-century architecture survived. The city gained independence on 15 July 1811.

On July 9, 1997, an earthquake measuring 7.0 on the Richter scale was recorded. It lasted approximately one minute and resulted in 73 fatalities across the entire state.

On February 22, 2026, the city, including the entire Sucre estate, suffered from the absence of water supply for over ten weeks caused by a failure in the Turimiquire supply. A water emergency was declared by Governor Jhoanna Carillo on 7 March 2026. The UN provided 2 million dollars in aid.

== Geography ==
=== Climate ===
Cumaná has a hot semi-arid climate (Köppen: BSh), narrowly bordering a tropical savanna climate (Aw).

Climate data for Cumaná (1991–2020)
Month	Jan	Feb	Mar	Apr	May	Jun	Jul	Aug	Sep	Oct	Nov	Dec	Year
Record high °C (°F)	35.2 (95.4)	37.3 (99.1)	38.4 (101.1)	39.7 (103.5)	38.4 (101.1)	36.5 (97.7)	39.8 (103.6)	36.4 (97.5)	37.3 (99.1)	37.4 (99.3)	37.0 (98.6)	36.0 (96.8)	39.8 (103.6)
Mean daily maximum °C (°F)	31.9 (89.4)	32.2 (90.0)	32.8 (91.0)	33.6 (92.5)	33.3 (91.9)	32.5 (90.5)	32.0 (89.6)	32.5 (90.5)	33.2 (91.8)	33.1 (91.6)	32.7 (90.9)	32.0 (89.6)	32.6 (90.7)
Daily mean °C (°F)	26.0 (78.8)	26.4 (79.5)	26.9 (80.4)	28.0 (82.4)	27.9 (82.2)	27.2 (81.0)	26.7 (80.1)	27.0 (80.6)	27.6 (81.7)	27.6 (81.7)	27.3 (81.1)	26.5 (79.7)	27.1 (80.8)
Mean daily minimum °C (°F)	21.6 (70.9)	21.8 (71.2)	22.5 (72.5)	23.7 (74.7)	24.0 (75.2)	23.7 (74.7)	23.3 (73.9)	23.5 (74.3)	23.9 (75.0)	23.8 (74.8)	23.5 (74.3)	22.5 (72.5)	23.1 (73.6)
Record low °C (°F)	16.5 (61.7)	17.0 (62.6)	18.1 (64.6)	19.5 (67.1)	16.1 (61.0)	18.7 (65.7)	18.9 (66.0)	19.9 (67.8)	19.4 (66.9)	19.5 (67.1)	19.5 (67.1)	18.1 (64.6)	16.1 (61.0)
Average rainfall mm (inches)	21.2 (0.83)	18.7 (0.74)	25.8 (1.02)	23.0 (0.91)	56.4 (2.22)	93.4 (3.68)	122.8 (4.83)	140.6 (5.54)	92.0 (3.62)	80.5 (3.17)	71.6 (2.82)	43.8 (1.72)	789.8 (31.09)
Average rainy days (≥ 1.0 mm)	3.6	2.7	2.2	2.9	6.4	12.3	16.4	16.6	12.0	11.6	9.8	7.4	103.9
Source: NOAA

== Attractions ==
The city features various colonial-style architecture. The Castle of Saint Anthony of the Eminence, a large Spanish fort, is open to the public and can be seen from the beach. Also surviving is the Santa Maria de la Cabeza castle, which was built in 1669. The Museo del Mar (Museum of the Sea) displays marine and maritime artifacts.

=== Basilica of Saint Agnes ===
The Basilica of Saint Agnes is the oldest church in the city. Restored around 1853, it is located in the San Francisco neighborhood, adjacent to the ruins of the Castle of Santa María de La Cabeza. It is noteworthy that the Church of Saint Agnes was not the first church constructed in the area; the Church of Our Lady of Mount Carmel, situated between the Castles of Santa María and San Antonio, was built shortly after the establishment of the Colonial Settlement. This church served as the city's first cathedral and retains the title of co-cathedral.

On 28 November 2023, Pope Francis declared the church a basilica. On 19 January 2024, the Solemn Dedication of the altar and the church was celebrated by Monsignor Jesús González de Zárate, Archbishop of Cumaná, together with the suffragan bishops and the Archbishop Emeritus of Coro. During the same ceremony, the official decree elevating the church to the rank of basilica was formally read by the Chancellor of the Archdiocese, Rev. Mauricio Rodríguez Gil.

=== Birthplace of the Poet José Antonio Ramos Sucre ===
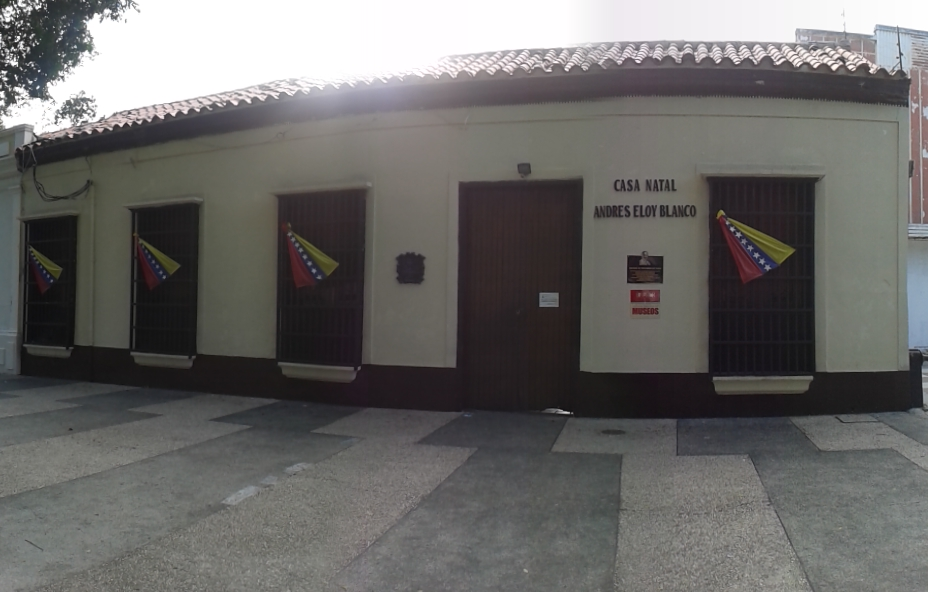
Birthplace of Andrés Eloy Blanco, Cumaná, Venezuela

The poet's birthplace is located in the historic center near the basilica of Santa Inés, at No. 29 Sucre Street. In 1907, the Ramos family relocated to Caracas. From that time onward, the house passed through several owners until 1976, when the Government of the State of Sucre decided to recover the property and designated it as the headquarters of the José Antonio Ramos Sucre Center for Literary Activities.

Today, the building has been transformed into a comprehensive cultural center, hosting lectures, concerts, and conferences, as well as a literary biennial that bears the poet's name.

=== Castle of Saint Anthony of the Eminence ===
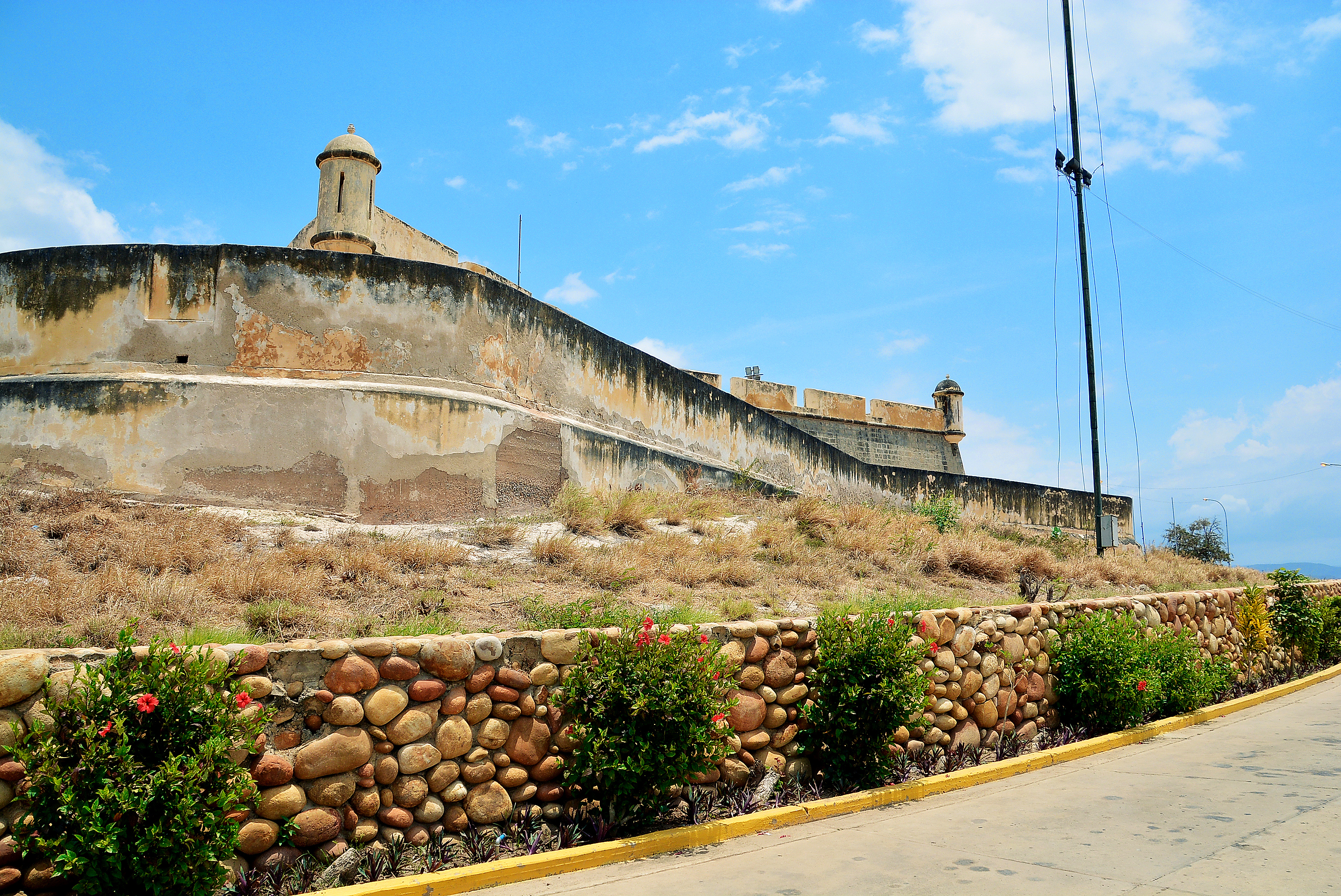
Castillo de San Antonio de la Eminencia

The castle of San Antonio de la Eminencia is a colonial fortress constructed in the seventeenth century by the Spanish monarchy in Cumaná, Venezuela. The purpose was to defend the city against the frequent attacks of English, French, and Dutch pirates. Originally known as Careacus, its construction began around 1659. Over the centuries, the structure underwent various renovations due to the significant damage caused by the powerful earthquakes that have repeatedly struck the city. A smaller fortification had been erected in 1668; in 1670, Don Juan de Urtarte, Governor of the Province of Cumaná, formally requested the strengthening and fortification of the structure.

Former President José Antonio Páez was imprisoned in the castle in 1849 after taking up arms against President José Tadeo Monagas, following his failed invasion of Venezuela from Curaçao in 1848. Páez remained confined there until May 24, 1850, when he was expelled from the country. The castle was declared a National Monument in 1965. At present, it is open to the public and may be visited by tourists in the city.

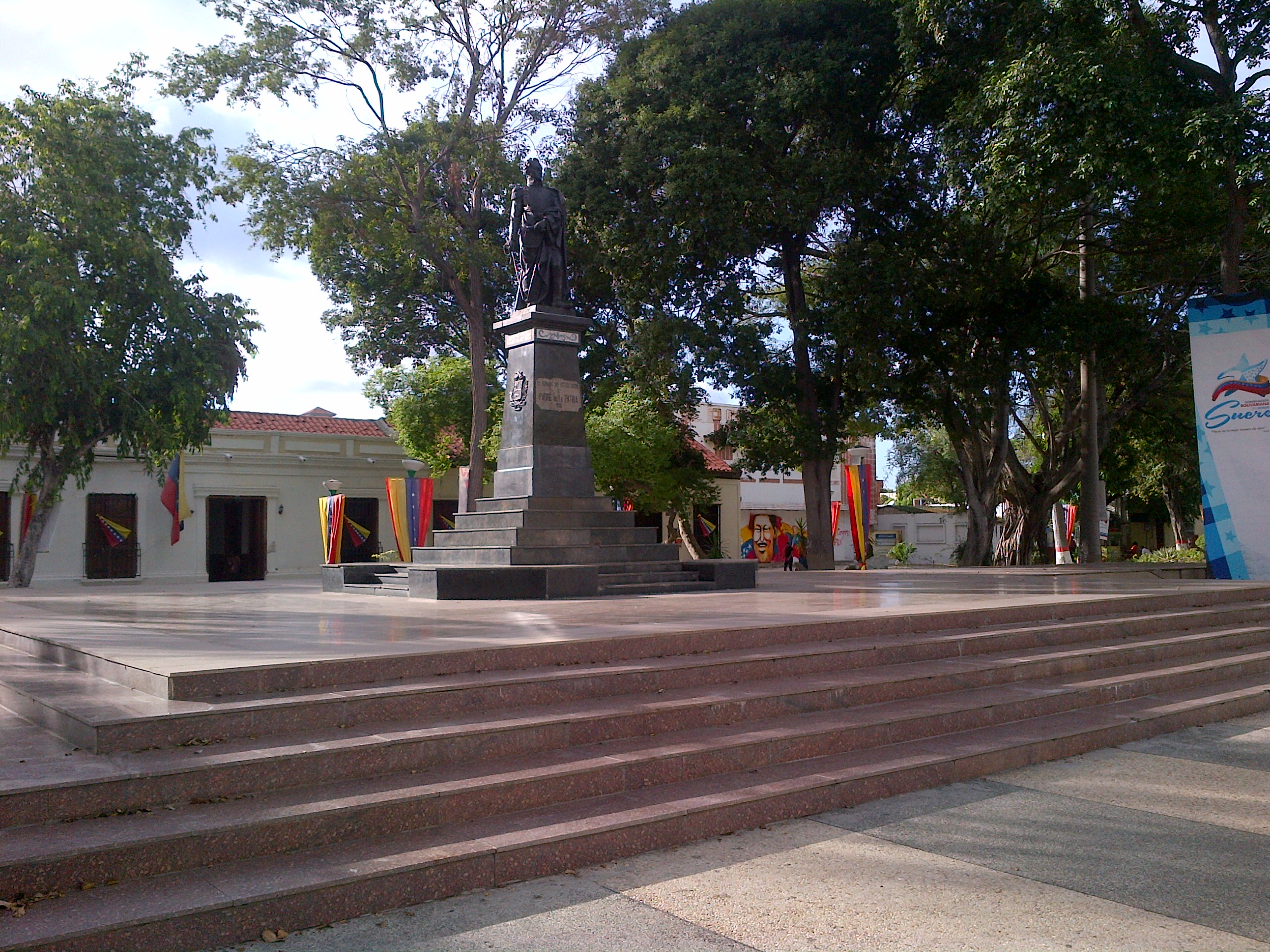
Plaza Bolívar de Cumaná, Venezuela

=== Place of Bolivar ===
Built in 1930 to commemorate the centenary of the death of the Liberator, by Doctor Antonio Álamo, president of the state. Initially known as Parque Bolívar, it was built on the remains of the Sucre Museum, which collapsed in the 1929 earthquake. Prior to the Sucre Museum, the Casa de la Moneda (Mint House) had stood on that same site (from 1797 until the early 1900s). Plaza Bolívar, along with Plaza Pichincha, was restored for the celebration of the five-hundredth anniversary of the founding of Cumaná.

== Indigenous species ==
The Cumana region is home to the Endler's livebearer, a vibrantly coloured aquarium fish named after John Endler, who discovered it in nearby Laguna de Los Patos.

== Notable people ==
- Iñaki Anasagasti (b. 1947), Spanish politician
- Rafael Betancourt (b. 1975), baseball player
- Andrés Eloy Blanco (1897–1955), poet, humorist and politician
- José Buttó, (b. 1998), baseball player
- Armando Galarraga (b. 1982), baseball player
- Edgardo Henriquez (b. 2002), baseball player
- César Jiménez (b. 1984), baseball player
- Luis Maza (b. 1980), baseball player
- Javier Otero (b. 2002), footballer
- Luis Peñalver (b. 1941), baseball player
- Vanessa Peretti (b. 1986), first deaf entrant in the Miss Venezuela pageant
- Gelmin Rivas (b. 1989), footballer
- Francisco Sánchez (b. 1976), swimmer, world champion
- Antonio José de Sucre (1795–1830), independence leader
- Jesús Sucre (b. 1988), baseball player
- José Antonio Ramos Sucre (1890–1930), poet and diplomat

== Transportation ==
The city is served by Antonio José de Sucre Airport, with commercial passenger airline flights to Caracas.

== Gallery ==
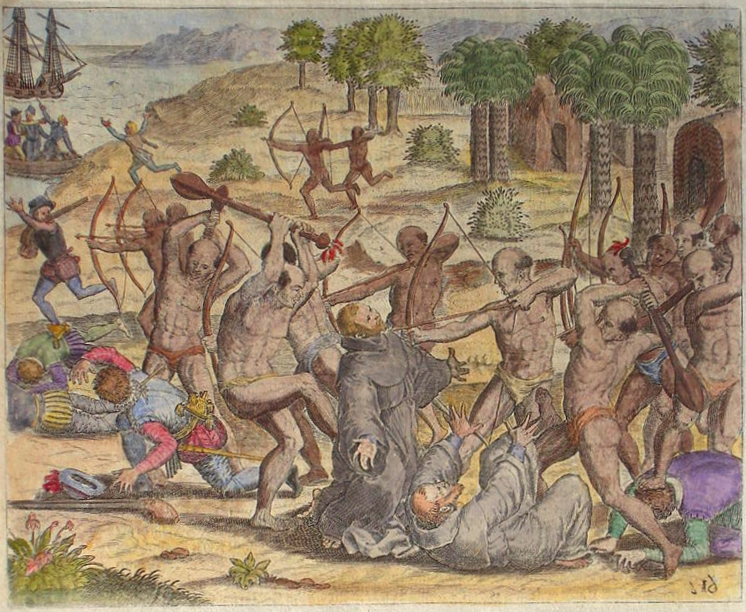
The Natives of Cumaná attack the mission after Gonzalo de Ocampo's slaving raid. Colored copperplate by Theodor de Bry, published in the "Relación brevissima de la destruccion de las Indias".

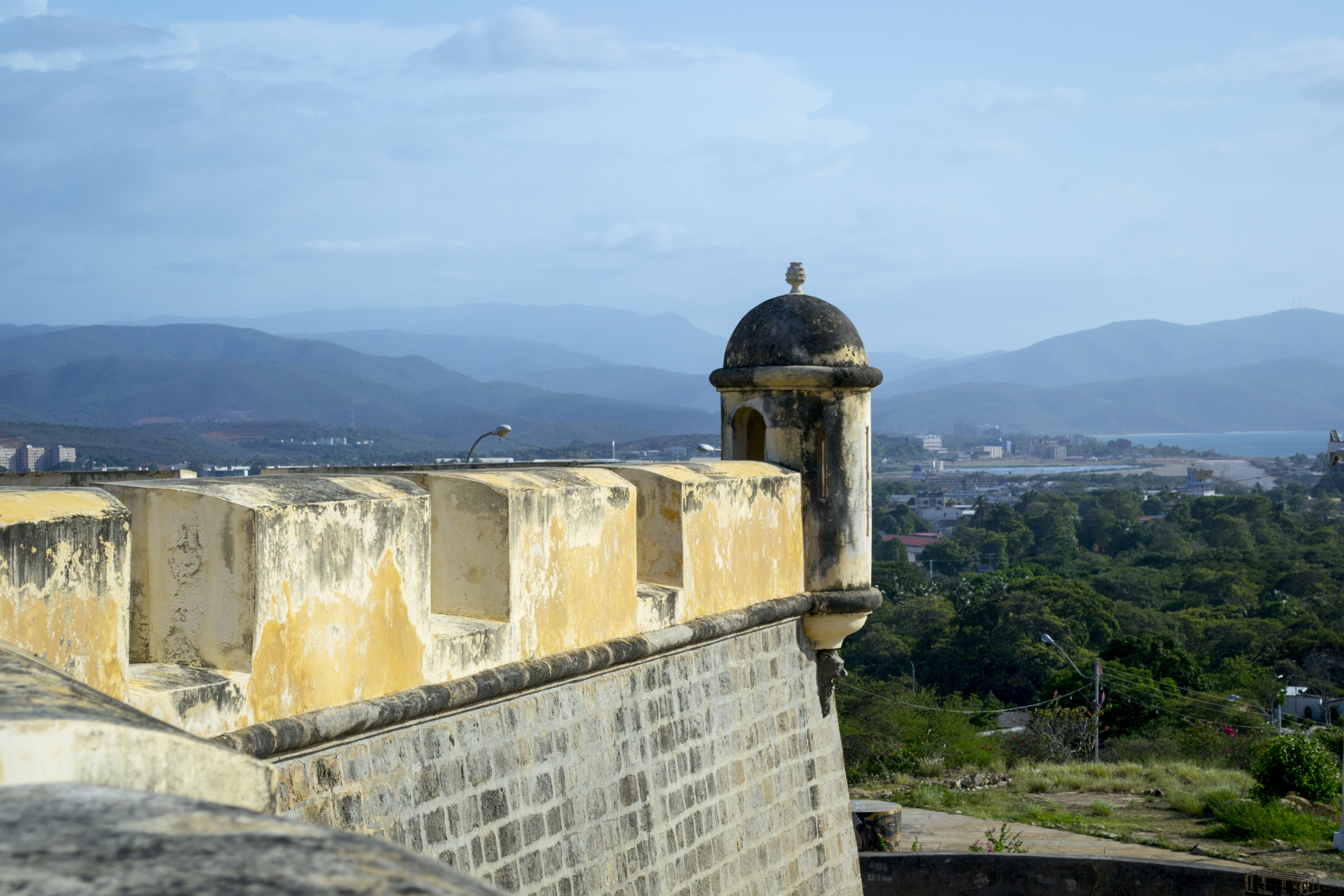
Castle of San Antonio de la Eminencia

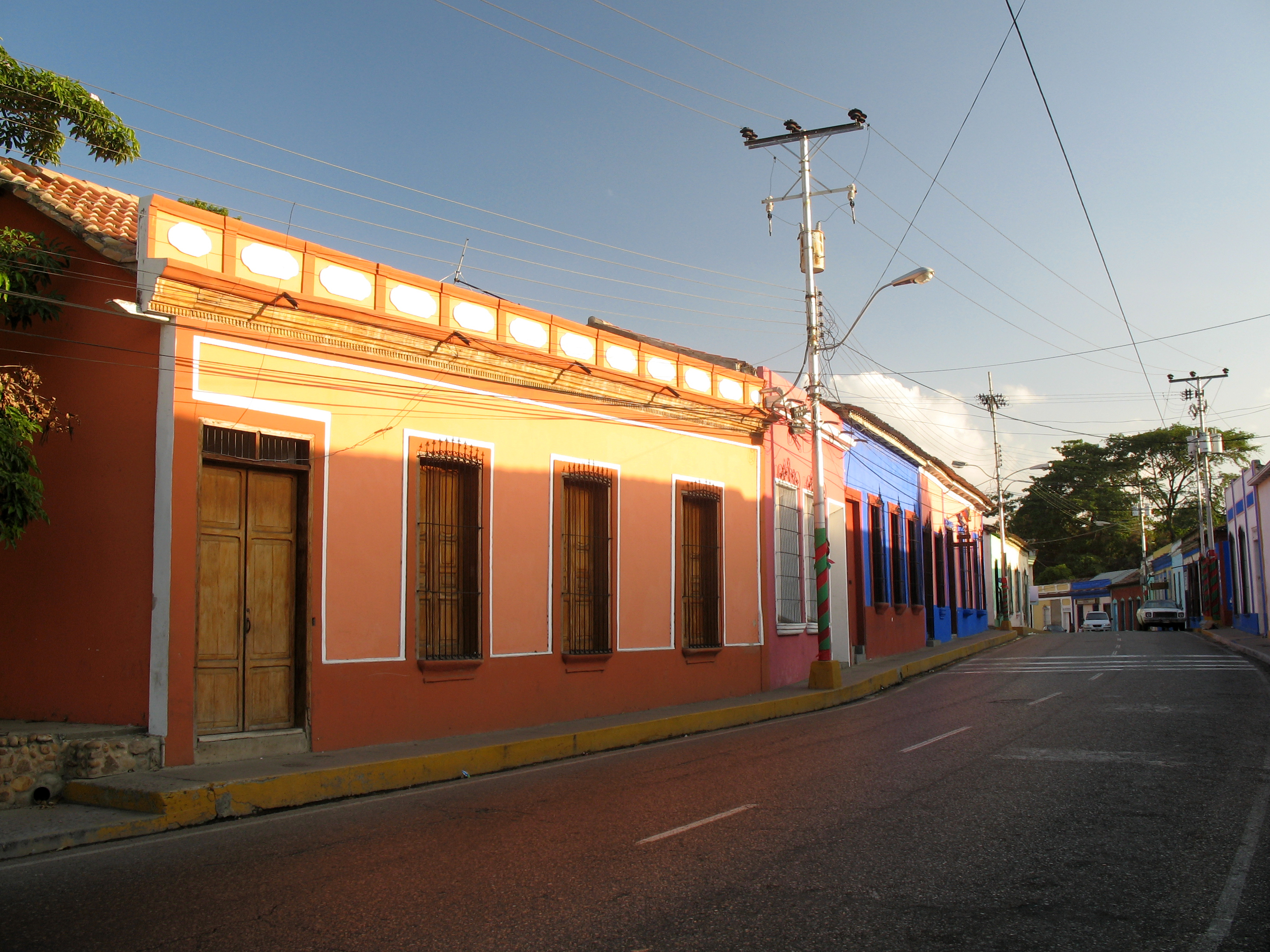
Sucre Street

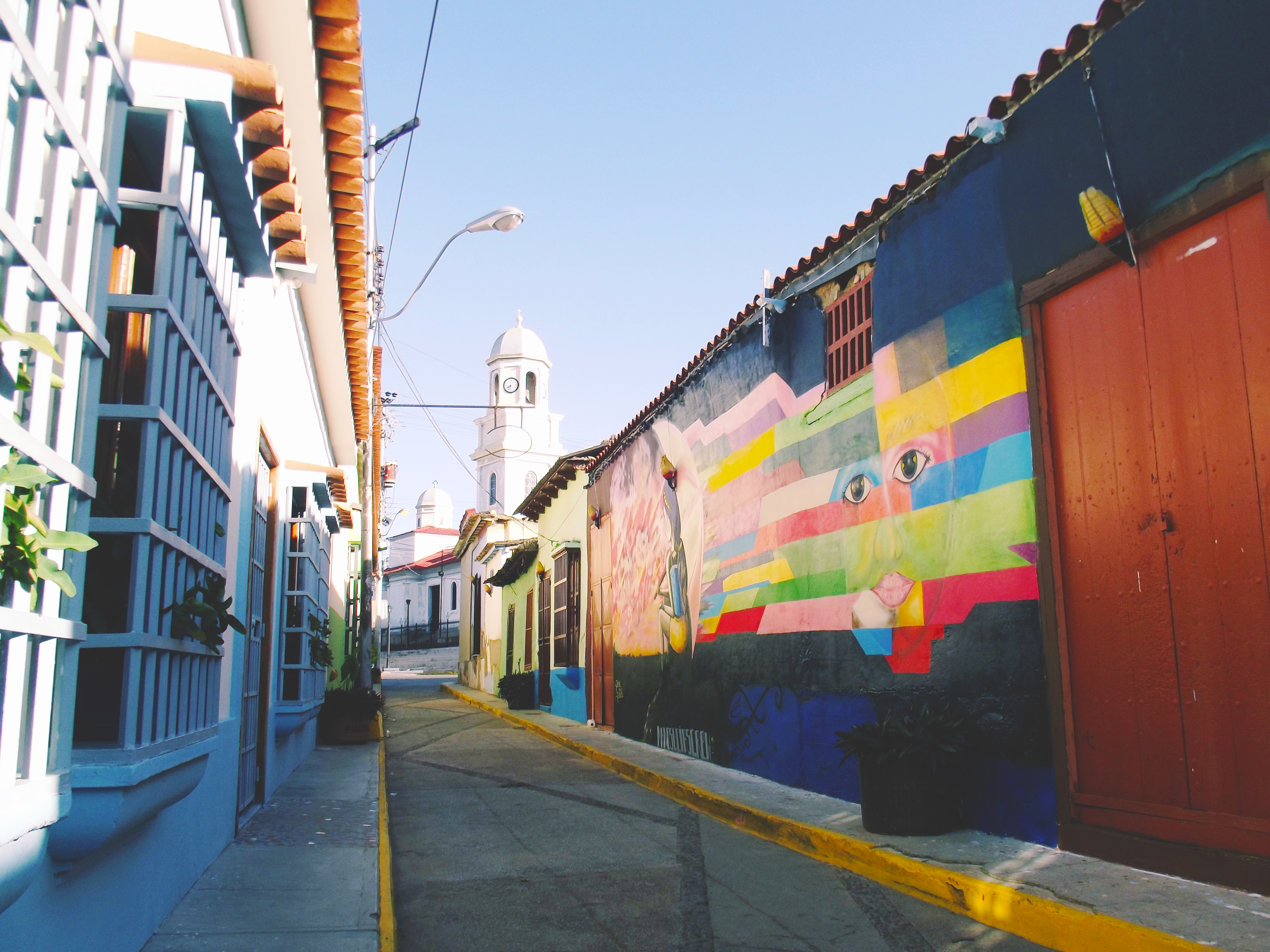
Historical quarter of Cumaná

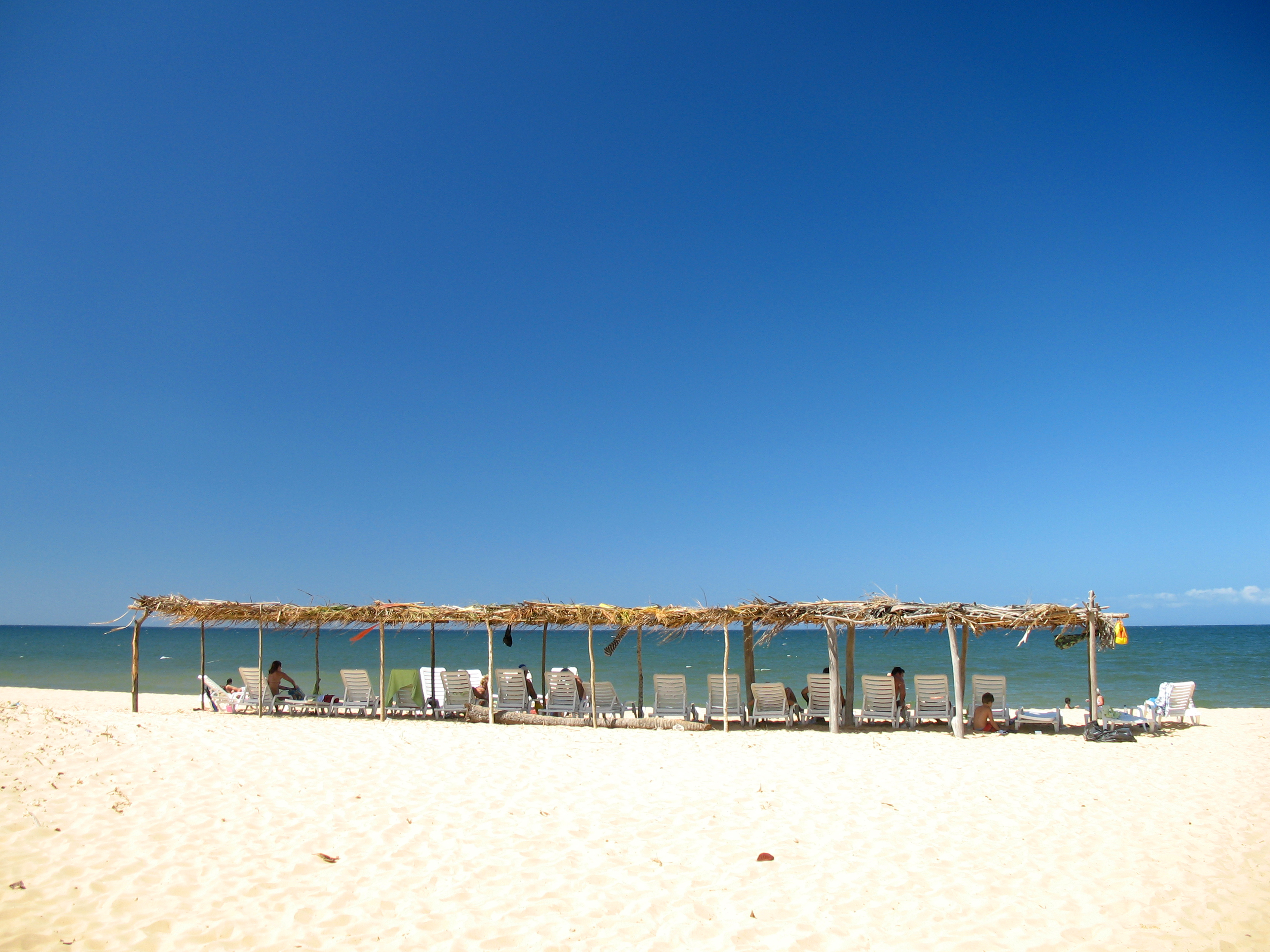
San Luis Beach

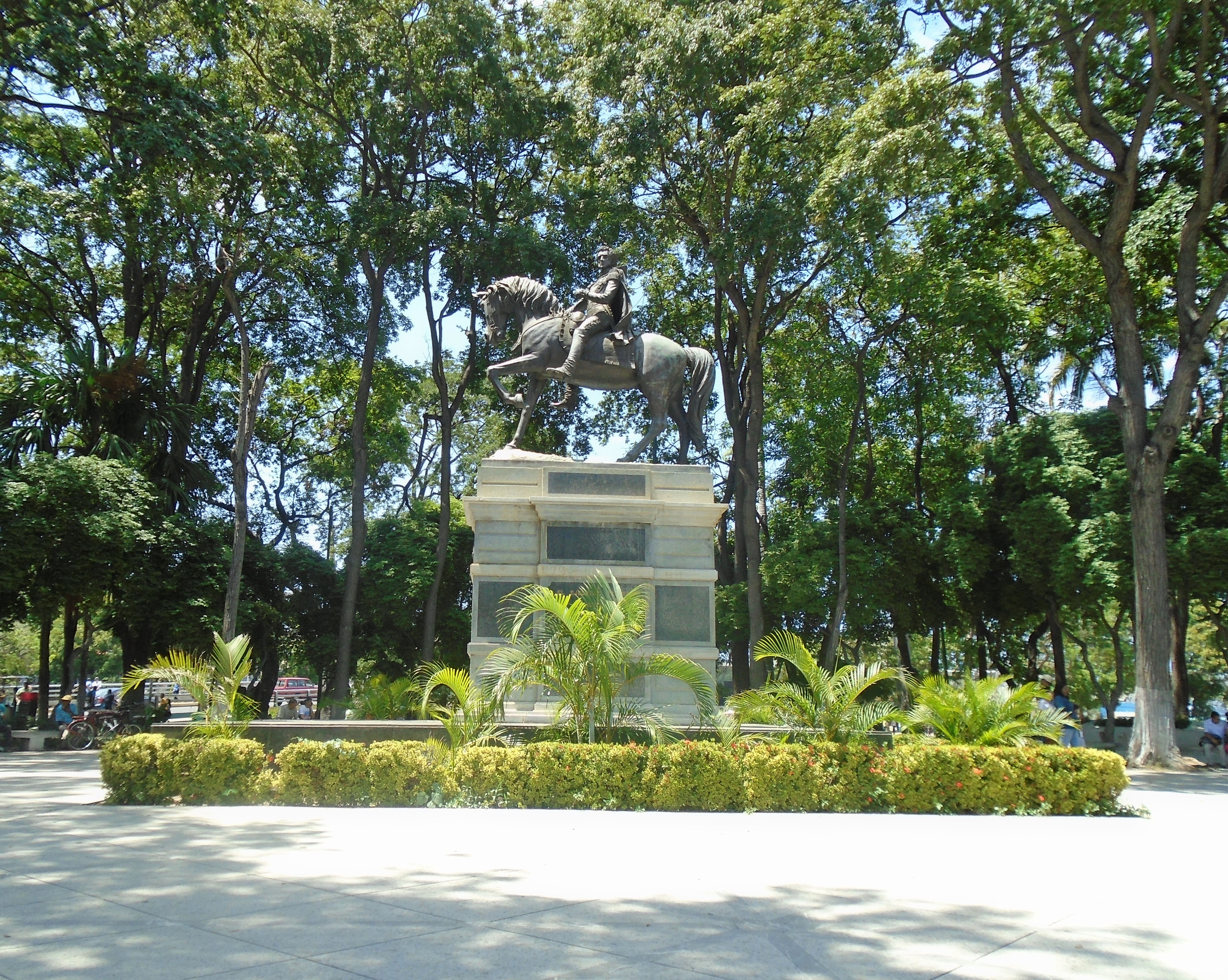
Ayacucho Square

== See also ==
- List of cities and towns in Venezuela
