= Marites =

Marites may refer also to the following:

== People ==
Given name

- Marites Burce (born 1975) – Filipino para-athlete
- Marites D. Vitug – Filipina journalist

Fictional

- Teresa "Marites" Asuncion-Dimaguiba, main character from Philippine drama series FPJ's Batang Quiapo

== Others ==
- TSS Marites, one of the other names of TSS Empire Byng, a ship owned by various organizations in the 20th century
- Laguna de Las Marites Natural Monument – a protected area with natural monument status located on the southeast coast of the coastal plain of Margarita Island, Venezuela
