= García Municipality =

García Municipality Municipio García
- Municipality
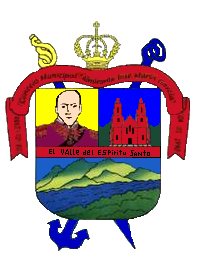
- Coat of arms

- Location in Nueva Esparta

- Location in Venezuela
- Coordinates: 10°56′42″N 63°54′16″W
- Country: Venezuela
- State: Nueva Esparta
- Municipal seat: El Valle del Espíritu Santo

Area
  - Total: 79.6 km^{2} (30.7 sq mi)
- Time zone: UTC−4 (VET)
- Website: garcia-nuevaesparta.gob.ve

García, officially José María García is a municipality located in the eastern part of Margarita Island, bordered by the Caribbean Sea and with the municipalities of Arismendi, Mariño and Díaz, in Venezuela. The municipal capital is El Valle del Espíritu Santo.
