= Nueva Esparta =

Nueva Esparta State Estado Nueva Esparta
- State
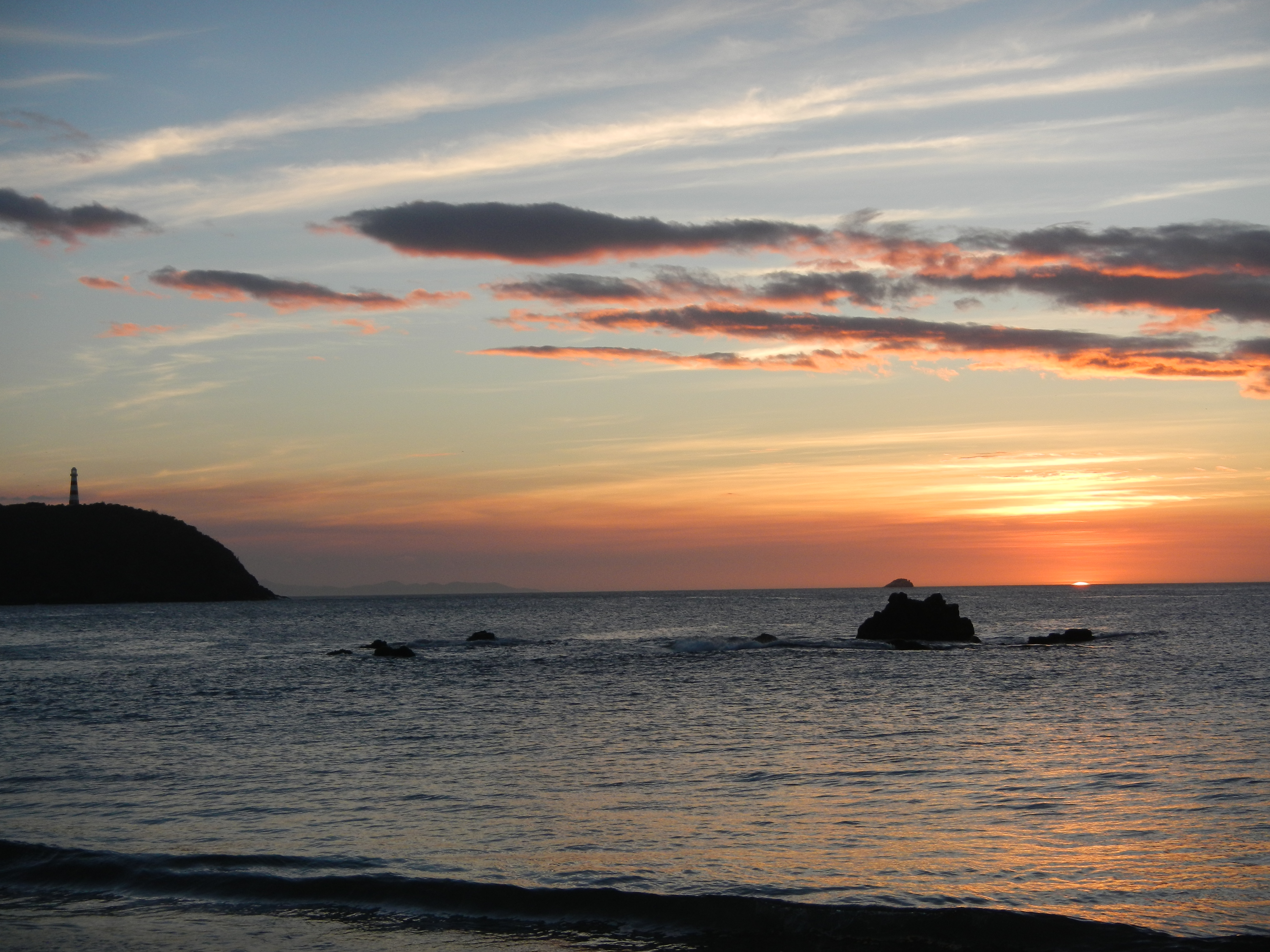
- Venezuelan state of Nueva Esparta

- Flag Coat of arms
- Anthem: Himno del Estado Nueva Esparta
- Location within Venezuela
- Coordinates: 11°N 64°W
- Country: Venezuela
- Created: 1909
- Capital: La Asunción
- Largest city: Porlamar

Government
  - Body: Legislative Council
  - Governor: Marisel Velásquez

Area
  - Total: 1,151 km^{2} (444 sq mi)
  - Rank: 23rd
- 0.12% of Venezuela
- Elevation: 159 m (522 ft)

Population (2010 Census)
  - Total: 491,610
  - Rank: 19th
  - Density: 427.5/km^{2} (1,107/sq mi)
- 1.68% of Venezuela
- Time zone: UTC−4 (VET)
- ISO 3166 code: VE-O
- Emblematic tree: Guayacán (Guaiacum officinale)
- HDI (2019): 0.732 high · 5th of 24
- Website: laguardia295.com/nueva-esparta-isla-de-margarita.html

Nueva Esparta State (Spanish: Estado Nueva Esparta, pronounced [esˈtaðo ˈnweβa esˈpaɾta]) is one of the 23 states of Venezuela. It comprises Margarita Island, Coche, and the lightly inhabited Cubagua.

The state is located off the northeast Caribbean coast of Venezuela. The main island of Margarita has an area of 1,020 km^{2} (390 sq mi). Its capital city is La Asunción, and the main urban center is Porlamar.

== Etymology ==
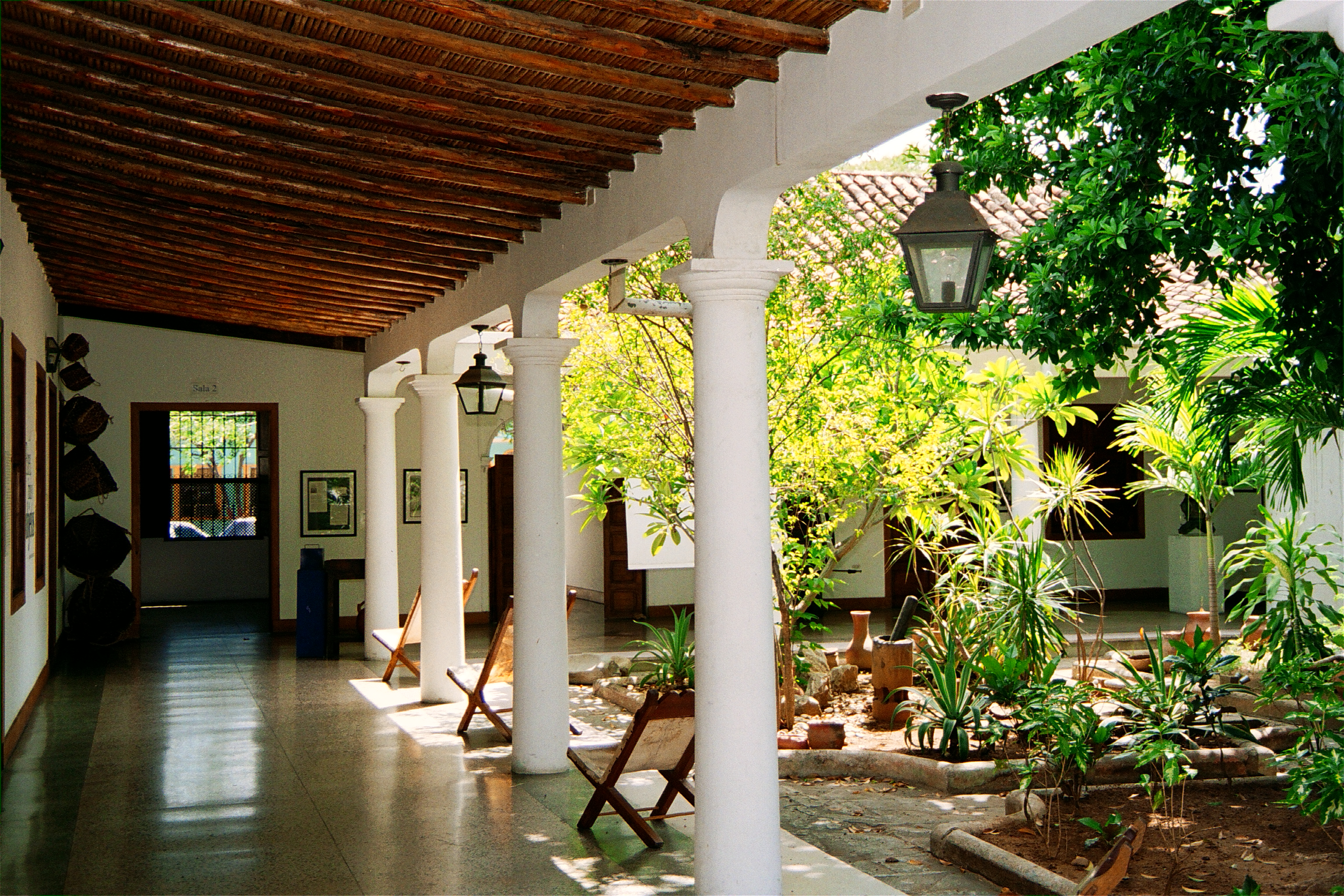
Colonial architecture at the Museum of the Insular Man

Its name, Nueva Esparta ("New Sparta"), comes from the heroism shown by its inhabitants during the Venezuelan War of Independence, deemed similar to that of the Spartan soldiers of Ancient Greece.

== History ==
=== Spanish colonization ===
Margarita was discovered on August 15, 1498, during Columbus' third voyage. On that trip the Admiral would also discover mainland Venezuela. That day, Columbus saw three islands, two of them small, low and arid (the current Coche and Cubagua), separated by a channel from a third, larger one, covered with vegetation and populated by indigenous people who called it Paraguachoa, a word that means "fish in abundance" according to historians, and "sea people" according to others.

Columbus named the island La Asunción, because it was discovered on the religious date of the Virgin that bears his name. The following year, in 1499, Pedro Alonso Niño and Cristóbal Guerra renamed it La Margarita, due to the abundance of pearls found in the region; other hypotheses suggest that the name Margarita refers to Queen Margarita of Austria-Styria.

Shortly after its discovery, other European sailors confirmed the existence of rich pearl deposits in Cubagua, whose exploitation gave rise to the first Spanish establishment in Venezuela. According to Fray Bartolomé de las Casas, in 1500, only 2 years after his sighting, there were already 50 adventurers installed in Cubagua who were eagerly looking for the precious mother-of-pearl gems used by the natives in their personal ornaments. This settlement of small Spanish villages for the exploitation of these pearl riches in Cubagua consisted of Cabildo and Regidores by 1510. But the settlement was carried out in this early date spontaneously without following Hispanic patterns, since even in 1517, it is indicated that the population resided in awnings and huts.

At first, all official attempts to achieve the colonization of Cubagua failed: the problem of water supply was paramount, and it was concluded that the establishment of a village in Cubagua could not bear fruit without the previous construction of a fortress at the mouth of the river of today's Cumaná, which was the one that supplied the water.

Gonzalo Fernández de Oviedo y Valdés' version that the establishment of Cubagua dates back to 1517 is considered correct. Under the protection of the Cumaná fortress, which was finally built in early 1523, the village of Cubagua was quickly organized and an extraordinary boom emerged in the exploitation of pearl pleasures.

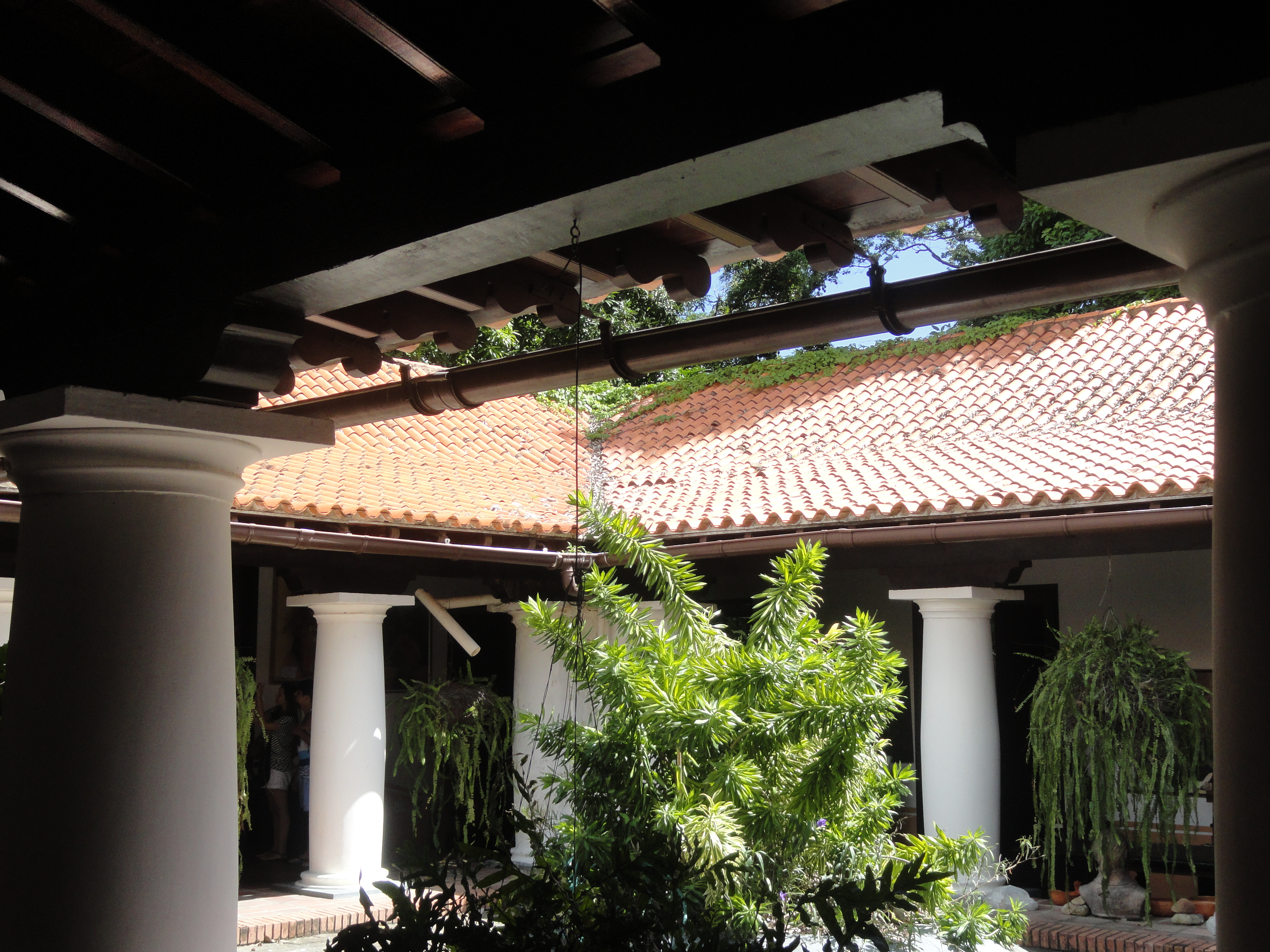
Santiago Mariño Museum

It is unlikely that before 1525, the residents of the village of Cubagua were aware of being a town or city. None of the pearl records from 1521 to 1525, which are the first known local sources of Cubagua, mention the name of the village on this island, and only speak of Cubagua.

In 1526, the town was elevated to the category of Villa with the name of "Villa de Santiago de Cubagua", although it seems that this title was never used. On September 13, 1528, this town was granted the rank of city, was given a coat of arms, the first ordinances were issued granting the city political autonomy and its name was changed to "Nueva Cádiz". Through these ordinances, the city of Nueva Cádiz, today recognized as the first city of Venezuela, did not depend on Spanish aid from Santo Domingo, and could trade directly with Castile. This helped the inhabitants of Nueva Cádiz to stimulate their activity. They set about building their city, replacing the huts with stone houses, material brought from Araya, and increasing the number of inhabitants.

Between 1531 and 1532, the pearly beds showed the first signs of exhaustion. The growing population with scarce means of living, created in New Cadiz problems of supply of food, water and firewood. Foodstuffs arrived from Santo Domingo, water from the Manzanares River in Cumaná, and firewood was transported from Isla Margarita. When pearls were scarce, they sought new fisheries, and with the authorization of the Royal Court of Santo Domingo and King Carlos I, they moved to Cabo de la Vela.

The disappearance of the Cubagua population was a slow process due mainly to the lack of water, the resistance of the Indians to the exhausting work of the pearl fisheries, and to the conquests of distant lands. The visit of the French corsairs meant a serious threat to the survival of the city. Likewise, Caribbean boats prowled the contours of the island. However, the fundamental cause of Cubagua's depopulation was the disappearance of the oyster beds.

The population did not migrate all at once. Coinciding with the boom in fisheries in Cubagua there is already a migration to Cabo de la Vela, because there were not enough of them in Cubagua. By 1537, the island was becoming depopulated and in 1541, history indicates that a hurricane hit the island, possibly following an earthquake, and its inhabitants fled to Margarita and founded a town. In 1543, French pirates arrived at the ruins of Nueva Cádiz, where some 10 inhabitants still remained, and left the city in flames, causing the island to be abandoned once again.

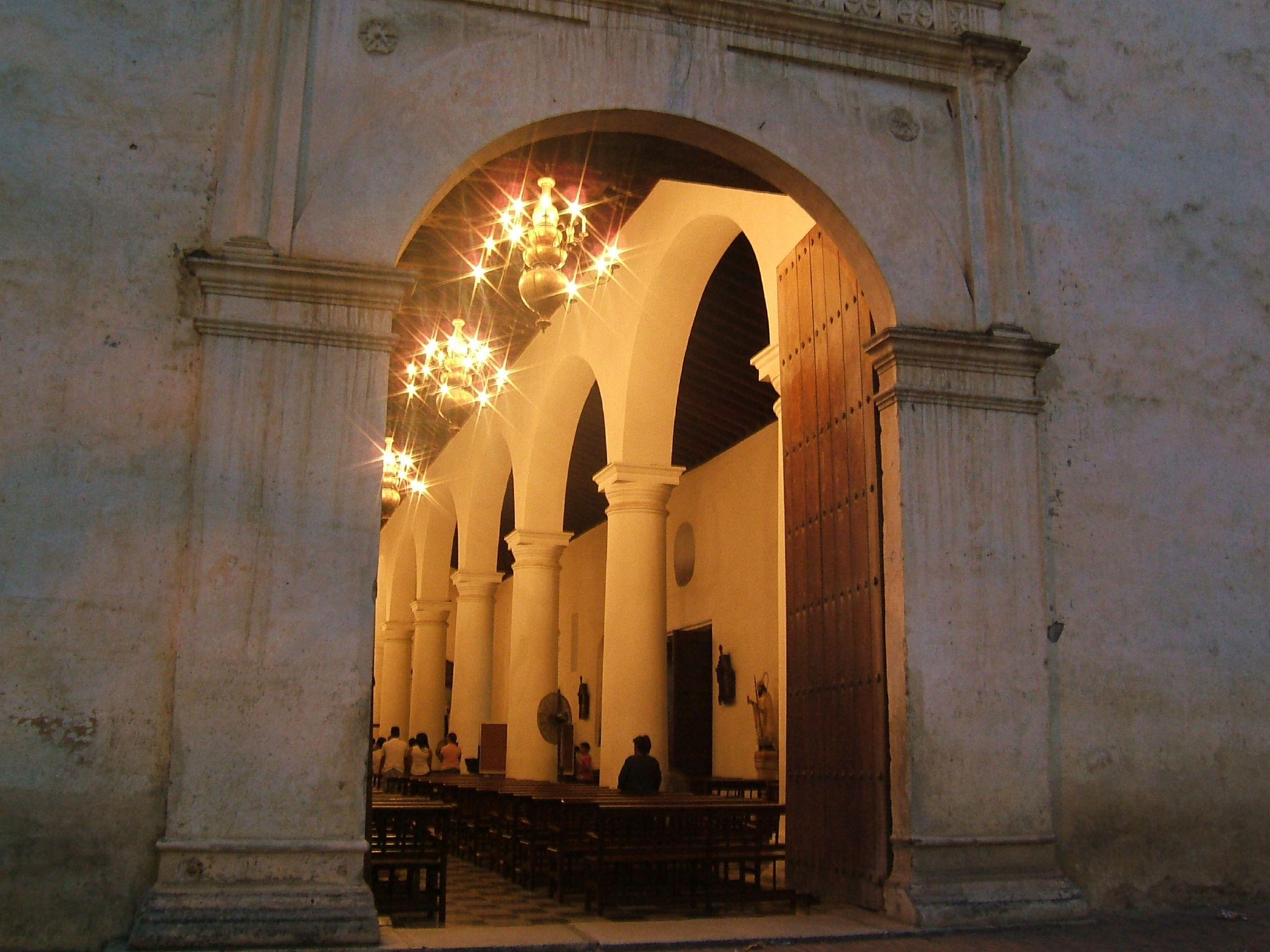
La Asunción Cathedral, the first building was built by the Spanish in 1571 and destroyed by the French in 1602

Although the exact date of its total abandonment by the Spaniards in this early period is not known, history indicates that by 1545, a group of residents of Nueva Cádiz aspire to incorporate Margarita under their jurisdiction, which confirms the existence of a population on the island at least for that date.

In 1676, the Marquis of Maitenon with a fleet of 10 ships and 800 French buccaneers attacked Margarita Island and Cumaná. This action motivated the Spanish to build several forts on the island.

The Province of Margarita is the oldest of those that in 1777 formed the Captaincy General of Venezuela. It had depended on the Royal Audience of Santo Domingo until 1739, when it was annexed to the Viceroyalty of New Granada, along with other States; and in 1830, when the Republic of Venezuela emerged, it was one of its 13 original provinces.

=== 19th and 20th centuries ===
In the Church of Santa Ana, an Assembly of Notables was held on May 6, 1816, in which the Third Republic of Venezuela was proclaimed as a single and indivisible nation: the Provisional Government of the Republic was established, the General Simón Bolívar proclaimed the Supreme Chief of the Republic, General Santiago Mariño was appointed second in command, and various military promotions are made. Bolívar signs the repeal of the Death War Decree of 1813. Inside the Church, the chair where General Bolivar sat down still remains, and monuments to those who participated in the assembly.

In 1835, the province of Margarita was divided into the cantons of La Asunción (composed of the parishes of Paraguachí, Pampatar, Los Robles, El Valle and Porlamar) and Norte (composed of the parishes of Tacarigua, Juangriego, San Juan, Pedro González and Sabana Grande).

In 1856, the province of Margarita was divided into the cantons of Norte (composed of the parishes of Norte, Juangriego, Tacarigua, Pedro González, Los Hatos, Pedregales, San Juan and the islands of Tortuga, Blanquilla, Testigos and Aves de Barlovento), with its capital in Santa Ana del Norte, and Sur (composed of the parishes of Asunción, Pampatar, Porlamar, Paraguachí, Espíritu Santo, Robles, and Sabana Grande), with its capital in La Asunción.

In 1864, when the country was divided into 20 states and a Federal District, Margarita took the name of Estado Nueva Esparta ("State of New Sparta"). The republic granted the title of "Nueva Esparta" to the island territory because of the heroism shown by the island's inhabitants in the struggle for Venezuela's independence, which resembled the Spartans of classical Greece. The complete exhaustion of the Cubagua pearl oysters in 1857 determined the abandonment of this island, and afterwards, it was visited by fishermen who built rancherías (ranches). In 1881, it became a section of the Great State of Guzmán Blanco (called Miranda from 1889 to 1898). In 1901, two years after the autonomy of the states was restored, it regained the name of Nueva Esparta, but lost it again between 1904 and 1909, during which time it was included in the Federal District as an Eastern Section. Finally, in 1909, it regained its statehood and in 1948, the island of Cubagua was annexed to its territory.

== Geography ==
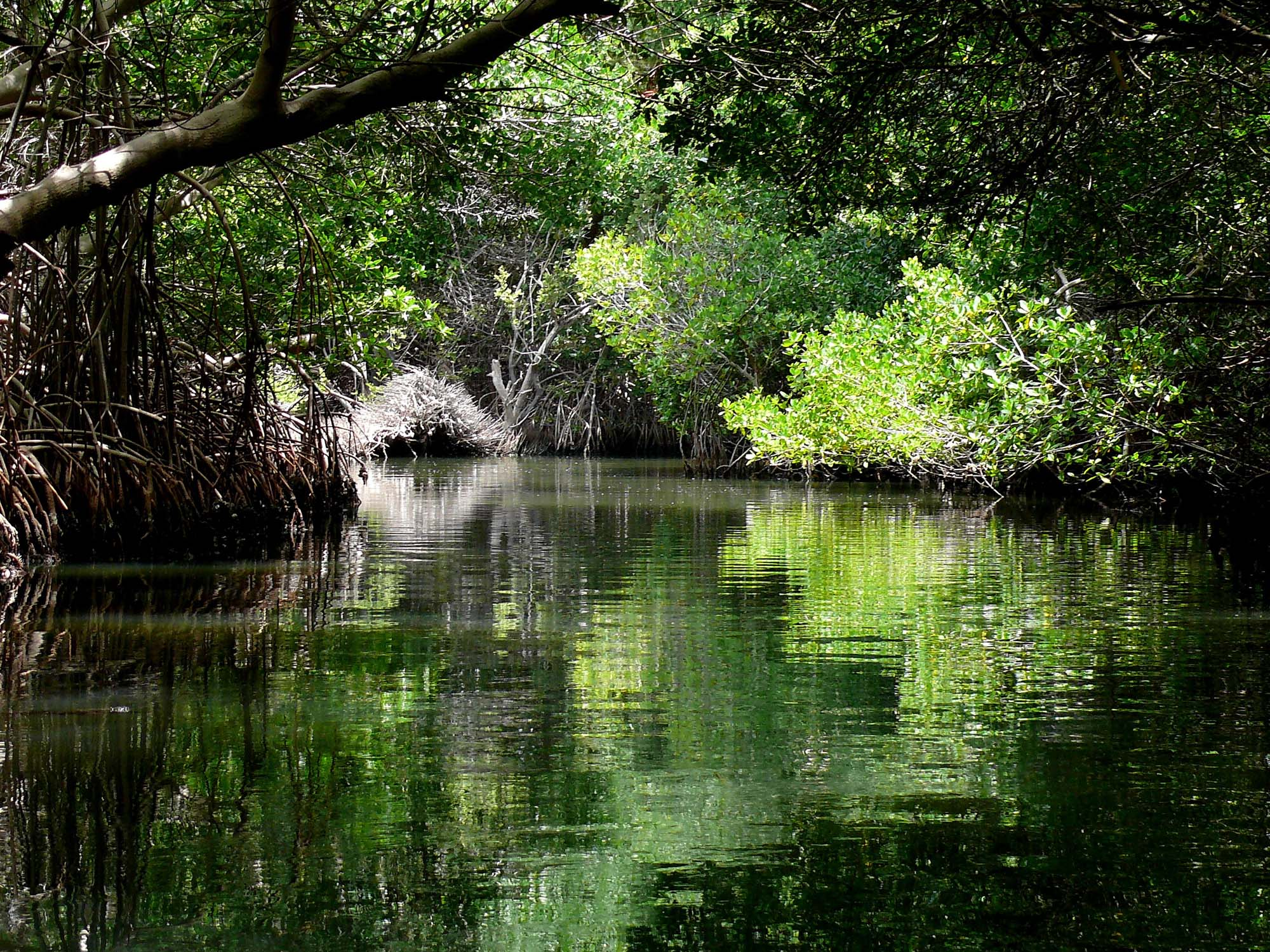
Laguna de la Restinga

The main island of Margarita has an area of 1,020 km^{2} (390 sq mi). Its capital city is La Asunción. The main urban center is Porlamar. Other important towns are Juan Griego, Pampatar (home of the Port Authority), Punta de Piedras, San Juan Bautista, Las Guevaras, Las Hernández, Villa Rosa, Bella Vista (Margarita), and El Valle del Espíritu Santo.

Nueva Esparta is located between the coordinates 10º44, 11º10` of North latitude and 63º (degrees) 46` (minutes), 64º13` of West longitude, in the insular region of the country.

The State is limited in all its cardinal points by the Caribbean Sea.

Together, the three islands of the State bring together magnificent beaches, wonderful mangroves and other landscapes that make it a true island paradise. Margarita, the largest of them, has a maximum elevation on Copey Hill (900 meters above sea level) and includes the Macanao mountain core to the west. Coche and Cubagua are rocky cores covered with marine sediments and have a flat relief, with cliffs. The climate is arid or semi-arid, to the point that there are no permanent current rivers. The Nueva Esparta state is divided into 11 municipalities.

=== Municipalities ===

Political Territorial Division of Nueva Esparta
Municipality	Capital	Surface	Population	Density (km²)
Antolín del Campo	La Plaza de Paraguachí	72 km²	21,890	305.30
Arismendi	La Asunción	52 km²	23,616	454.15
Díaz	San Juan Bautista	166 km²	39,491	238.04
García	El Valle del Espíritu Santo	85 km²	49,967	587.16
Gómez	Santa Ana	96 km²	33,436	349.38
Maneiro	Pampatar	35 km²	35,901	1,028.68
Marcano	Juan Griego	40 km²	31,959	796.98
Mariño	Porlamar	39 km²	85,942	2,203.64
Península de Macanao^{1)}	Boca del Río	331 km²	5,205	69.26
Tubores^{2)}	Punta de Piedras	180 km²	30,062	167.10
Villalba	San Pedro de Coche	55 km²	80,238	218.33
Nueva Esparta	La Asunción	1,150 km²	387,175	336.67

=== Geology ===
The state territory is characterized by events of volcanism, sedimentation, emersion, deposition and uprising. Igneous-metamorphic rocks of the Mesozoic era form the foundation of the mountainous areas and their foothills, including the hill landscape, with the exception of the undulating reliefs of Pampatar, constituted by tertiary sediments, as well as the coastal plain. The lowest marine areas are Pleistocene and Holocene formations, composed of alluviums, coastal and alluvial terraces, calcareous sandstones and lagoon deposits. Coche and Cubagua are rocky cores covered with marine sediments from the Pre-Cambrian geological era.

=== Relief ===
The eastern sector of Margarita Island has three small mountain ranges, aligned in a southeast–northwest direction, whose altitude stops are the Copey, Matasiete, La Guardia and Guayamurí hills; To the southwest, the relief is flat, with the exception of moderate elevations, known as Las Tetas de María Guevara. The Macanao Peninsula, in the western sector, has an elongated east–west massif, between the Macanao and Guarataro hills. The rest are coastal plains that descend towards wide-ranging beaches. The islands of Coche and Cubagua offer a flat terrain with some cliffs.

The relief is composed of coastal plains, lagoons and mountain ranges. The coastal plains of the eastern massif descend to oceanic beaches and white sands that constitute a great tourist attraction, also conducive to sports and recreation activities.

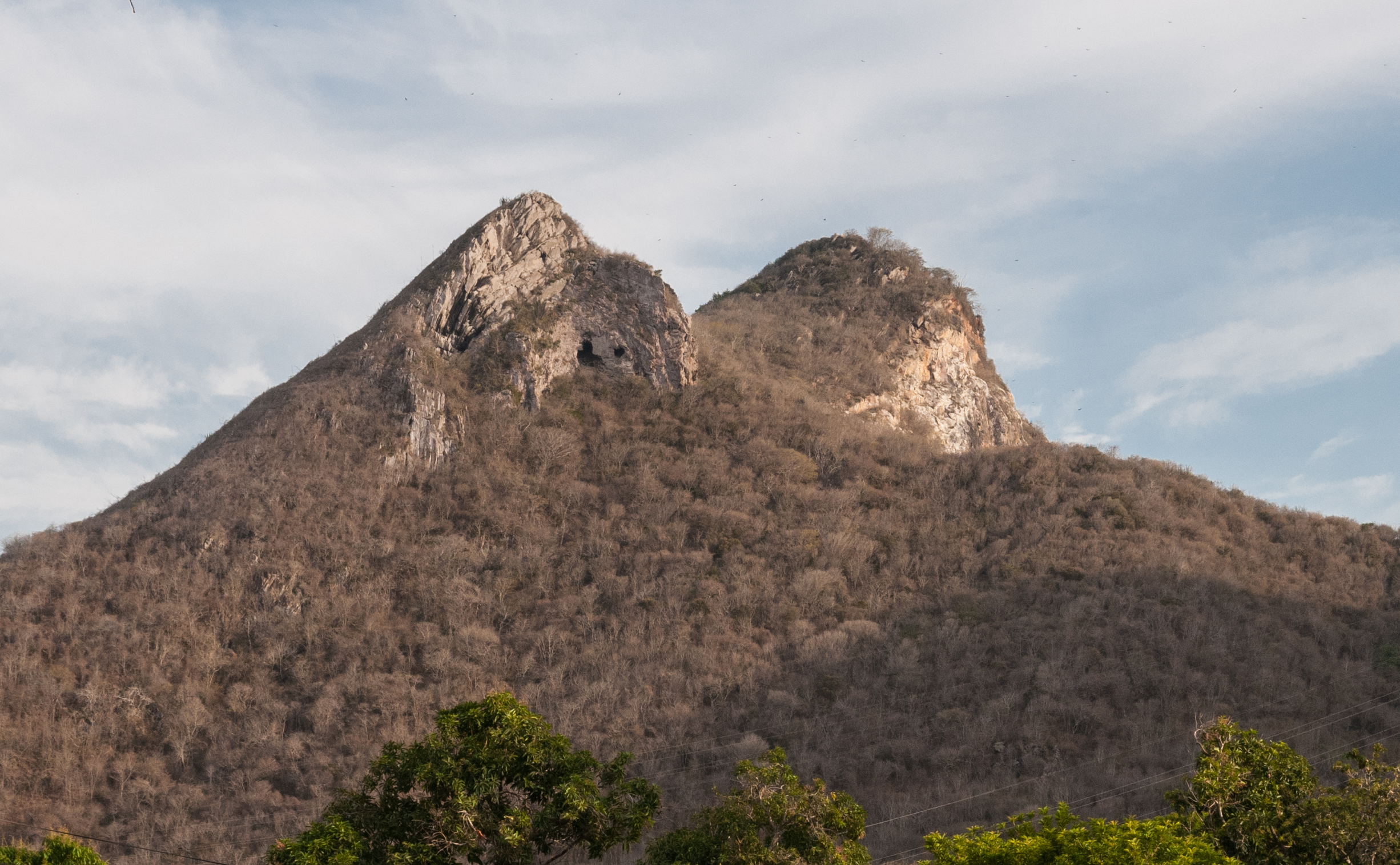
Cave of the Witch (Cueva de la Bruja), Cerro El Piache, Margarita Island

Among the highest elevations found in the state, there are:

Paraguachoa	Altitude (masl)	Macanao Peninsula	Altitude (masl)
Cerro Grande	920	Cerro Macanao	750
Cerro Copey	890	Cerro Los Cedros	745
Cocheima	810	Cerro Risco Blanco	680
Cerro Tragaplata	640	Cerro Guaraguao	660
Cerro El Cacho	510	Cerro Soledad	540
		Cerro Piedra Lisa	500
		Cerro El Castillo	380

=== Hydrography ===
There are no significant permanent water currents, but thin rivers lately seasonal due to climatic changes that have raised temperatures throughout the planet in recent years. Dry most of the year and with torrential in short periods of rain. Of these, the main ones are San Juan (San Juan poses), San Francisco, La Asunción, El Valle, Chaguaramal, El Muco, La Vieja, Negro and Tacarigua.

The lagoons of La Restinga, Los Mártires and Las Marites, together with the hot springs of the Holy Spirit Valley and the San Francisco sector, complete a scarce, insufficient and unsuitable hydrographic system to supply the local population with potable water.

=== Climate ===
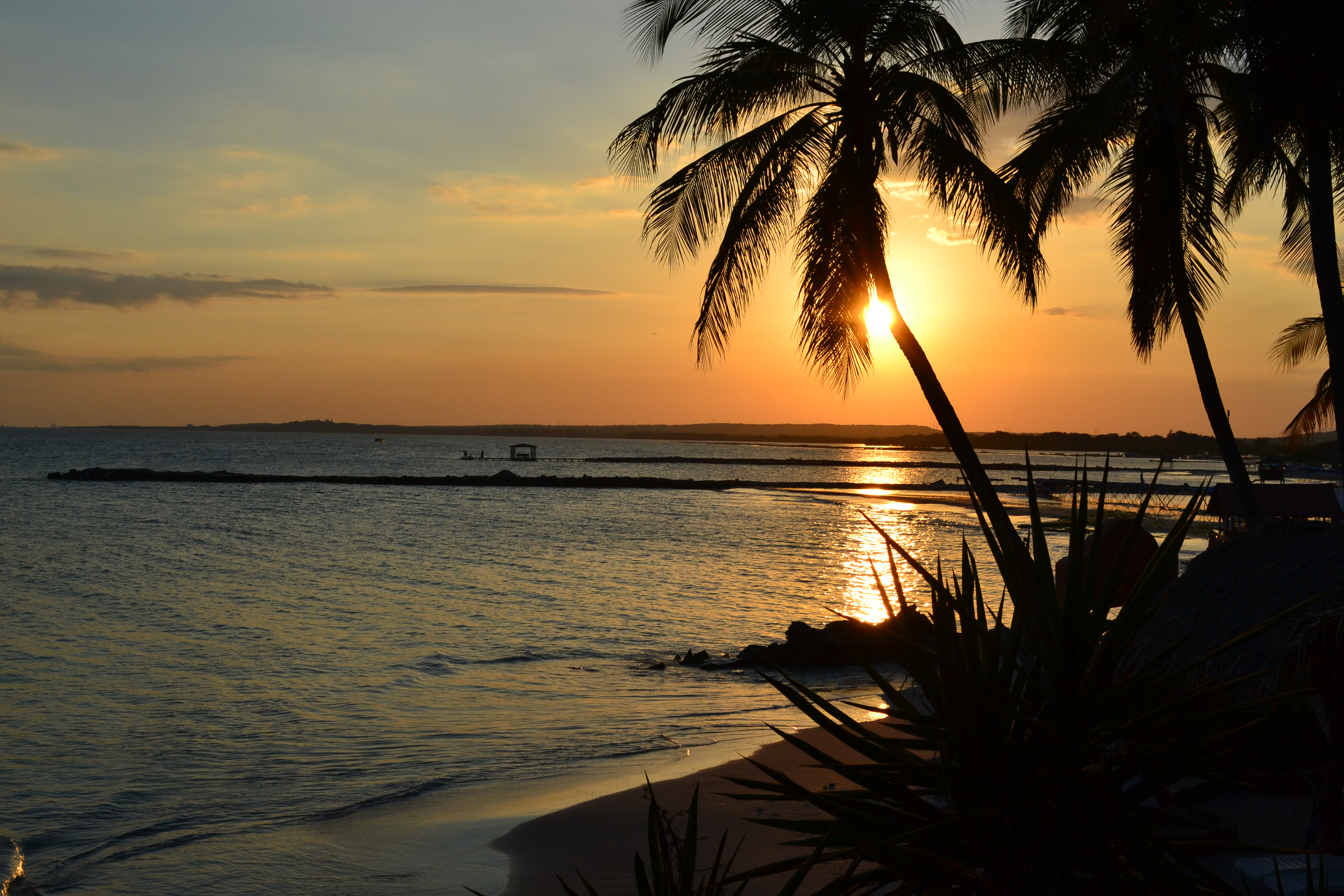
Playa El Yaque, Margarita Island

Nueva Esparta has a hot semi-arid climate, with microclimates ranging from very warm arid to warm-moderate semi-arid. The semi-arid climate dominates in Margarita. In Porlamar, the rainfall is only 399 millimetres or 16 inches annually with an average temperature of 27 °C or 81 °F. The areas with the highest rainfall are located in the Serranía de El Copey, reaching 1,100 millimetres or 43 inches per year. This, together with local fogs, allows the development of cloud forests, which derive on lower slopes in formations of premontane dry forests. Precipitation is lower in the Macanao Peninsula, ranging from 300 to 500 millimetres or 12 to 20 inches annually, with temperatures from 27 to 28 °C or 81 to 82 °F. In Coche, the average annual temperature is also high with rainfall of 512 millimetres or 20 inches annually. Dry conditions are rigorous in Cubagua with only 250 millimetres or 10 inches of rainfall per year, qualifying as a hot arid climate. If it is considered that in the coastal and beach sites, such as Porlamar, there are only 66 days of appreciable rainfall per year, the optimal conditions for various types of tourism are experienced. Some examples of its climate are Cerro Copey, Laguna de la Restinga, Macanao peninsula, and the islands of Coche and Cubagua.

On rare occasions, tropical cyclones affect the islands of the state due to their low latitude. Some cyclones that have affected the islands either directly or indirectly have been Hurricane Joan–Miriam in 1988 and Tropical Storm Bret in 1993.

=== Soils ===
The soil is thin and underdeveloped, subject to an intense erosive process due to overgrazing. The oscillations of the sea level and the deforestation carried out for agricultural use contribute to this. The valleys' soils, the best quality lands, are well developed, have an organic layer, are protected from the erosive action of the wind and are covered with vegetation, but only occupy a small proportion of the state. In the areas of Piedmont, the cones of injection and colluvial materials give rise to very stony soils. The islands of Coche and Cubagua have soils with salinity and strong erosion, resulting from the action of the winds, which gives their surface layer a stony character.

=== Vegetation ===
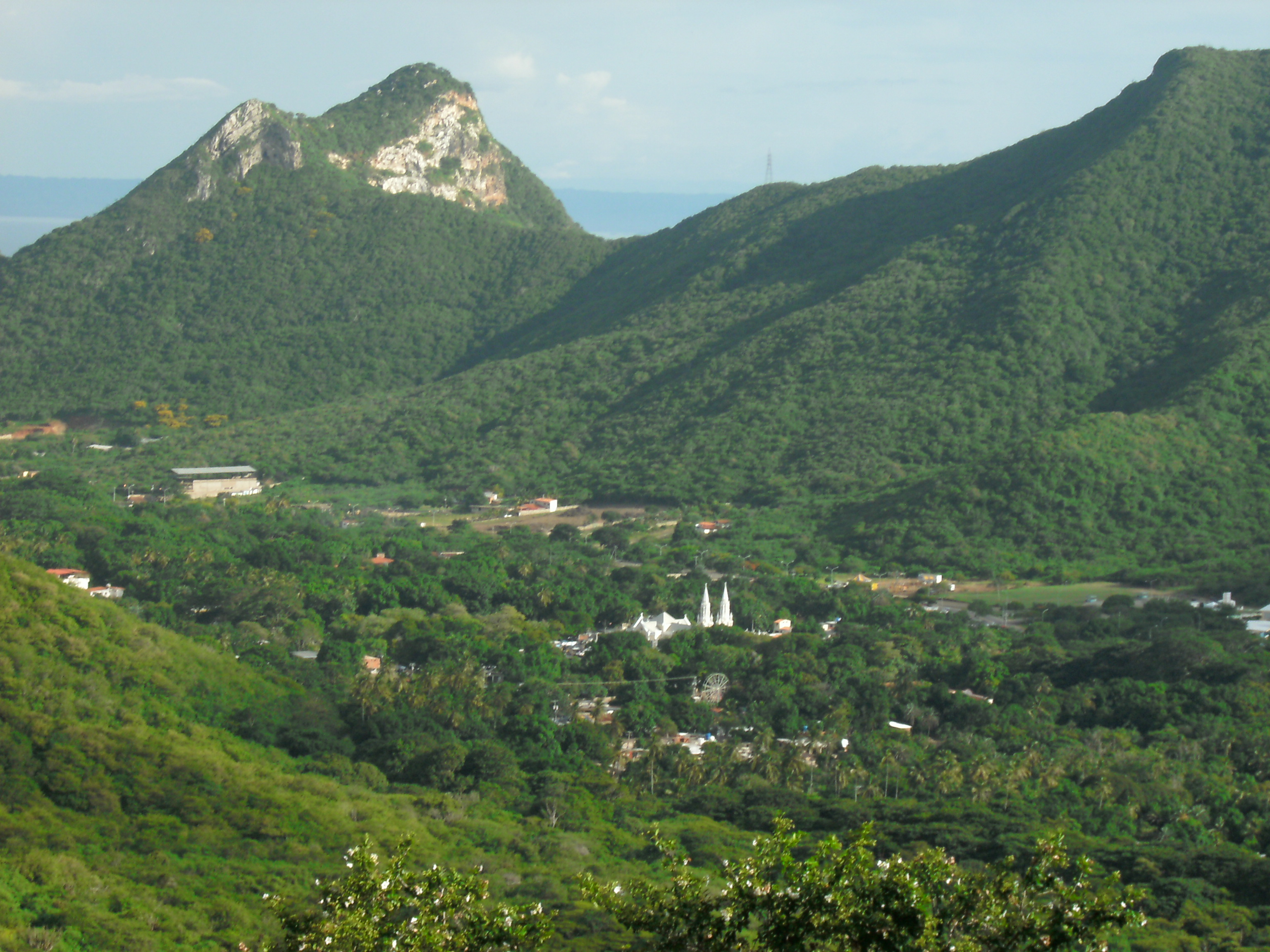
El Valle del Espíritu Santo

On Margarita Island, the climatic and / or edaphic effects have produced a mixture of life zones, with varied ecosystems that range from tropical desert weeds, in low and dry areas, to thorny mountains and tropical dry forest in areas of greater height. In the Copey hill is the premontane humid forest and in the swampy and saline areas mangroves abound. The most representative species are olive trees, divi-divi and pardillo, around the hills Matasiete, El Copey, and Guaraguao. The very dry forest is in areas of very intervened vegetation. The main species are: cují, guatacare, guamache, cardón, divisive and olive. The spines and desert weeds, dominant formations of the state, occupy the coastal plains. Its main species are abrojo, cují, yaque, oregano, naked Indian, prickly pear, cardon, divisive, guamache and others. Mangrove concentrations are located in La Restinga, Las Marites and other coastal water areas. The most important species are the red mangrove, button and the black mangrove.

Most of the state presents a vegetation corresponding to the insular coastal subregion of the type:

- Halophilic Coastal Herbazales: in low, open communities, in saline depressions of the coast, floristically poor (glass, glass grass, rabbit broom).
- Herbazales Litorales Psamófilos: (yerba de grama – Batatilla de Playa).
- Coastal Xerophilic shrubs: Cují, Yaque, Cuica, Yabo, Palo Verde, Guatacaro, Gatacare, yaguarey or cord data, Guasabara, Guasabano, Tuna Guafabora, Guayacán.
- Coastal Mangroves: red mangrove, black mangrove, pink mangrove, white mangrove, button mangrove and the corresponding to the Copey mountain range.
- Low to Medium Forests: Puy, Curaro, Aragüaney, Egg Yolk, Naked Indian, Indian Hide, Torco, White Spoon, Lemongrass.
- Sub-evergreen Submontane Ombrophile Forests: Aragüaney, Chaparro Bobo, Guamo, Palmito, Palmiche, Macanilla.
- Evergreen Dwarf Submontane shrubs: Cup, White Butter.
- Agricultural and Urban Lands: natural vegetation has been removed or altered in such a way that it is no longer recognizable as such.

=== Fauna ===
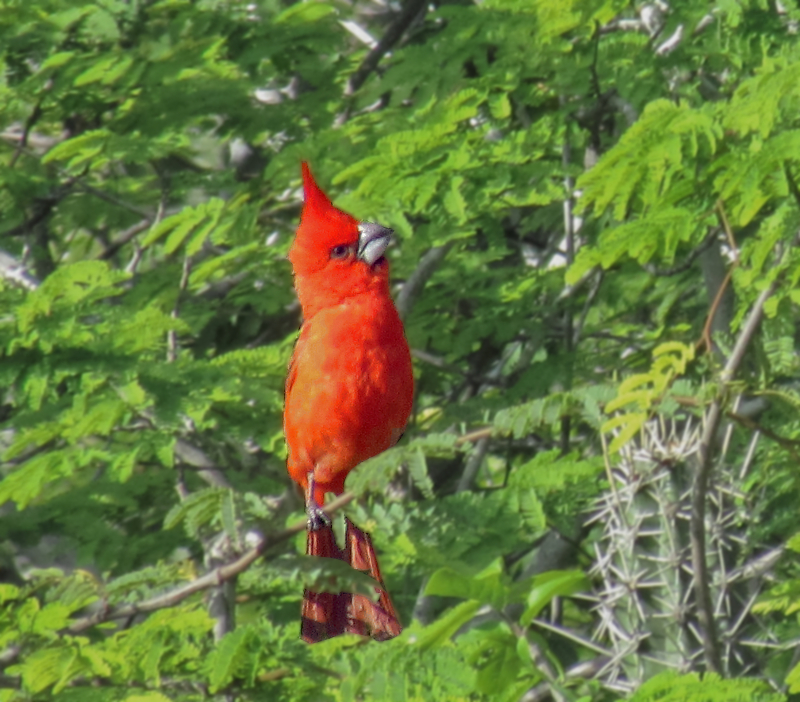
Cardinalis phoeniceus from Margarita Island

Fauna in the region include:

- Mammals: cottontail rabbit, red-tailed squirrel, white-tailed deer, skunk, ocelot, tufted capuchin, and nine-banded armadillo.
- Birds: chachalaca, troupial, partridge, cardinal, dove
- Reptiles: iguana, rattlesnake, coral snake, anoles

The region has a great variety of animals; Among the most prominent animals of Margarita Island are:

- White-tailed deer (Odocoeilus virginianus margaritae): This deer is estimated to have a maximum weight of about 30 kg and feeds on leaves, fruits and plant materials. It is also one of the smallest white-tailed deer subspecies. They are found mainly in the Macanao Peninsula, and in the Cerro el Copey Park, where these particular white-tailed deer are rarely seen.
- Ocelot (Leopardus pardalis melanurus): This cat is from the family Felidae. Studies have not confirmed whether this mammal is in danger on the island, since it is rated Least Concern by the IUCN. This cat in Margarita and Venezuela is known as cunaguaro. Its general weight is 11 kg, a medium-sized feline. It feeds on young reptiles, birds, turtle eggs, monkeys, among others.
- Margarita Island capuchin (Sapajus apella margaritae): This is another subspecies of Margarita animals that is in danger of extinction. It weighs about 1.5 and 4 kg. They are found in troops, and their danger is due to habitat loss and hunting. In their diet they are frugivorous, herbivores and insectivores.
- Red-tailed squirrel (Notosciurus granatensis nesaeus): a subspecies of squirrel endemic to the island.
- Nine-banded armadillo (Dasypus novemcintus): a mammal related to anteaters and sloths. It has a distinctive shell to protect it from predators.

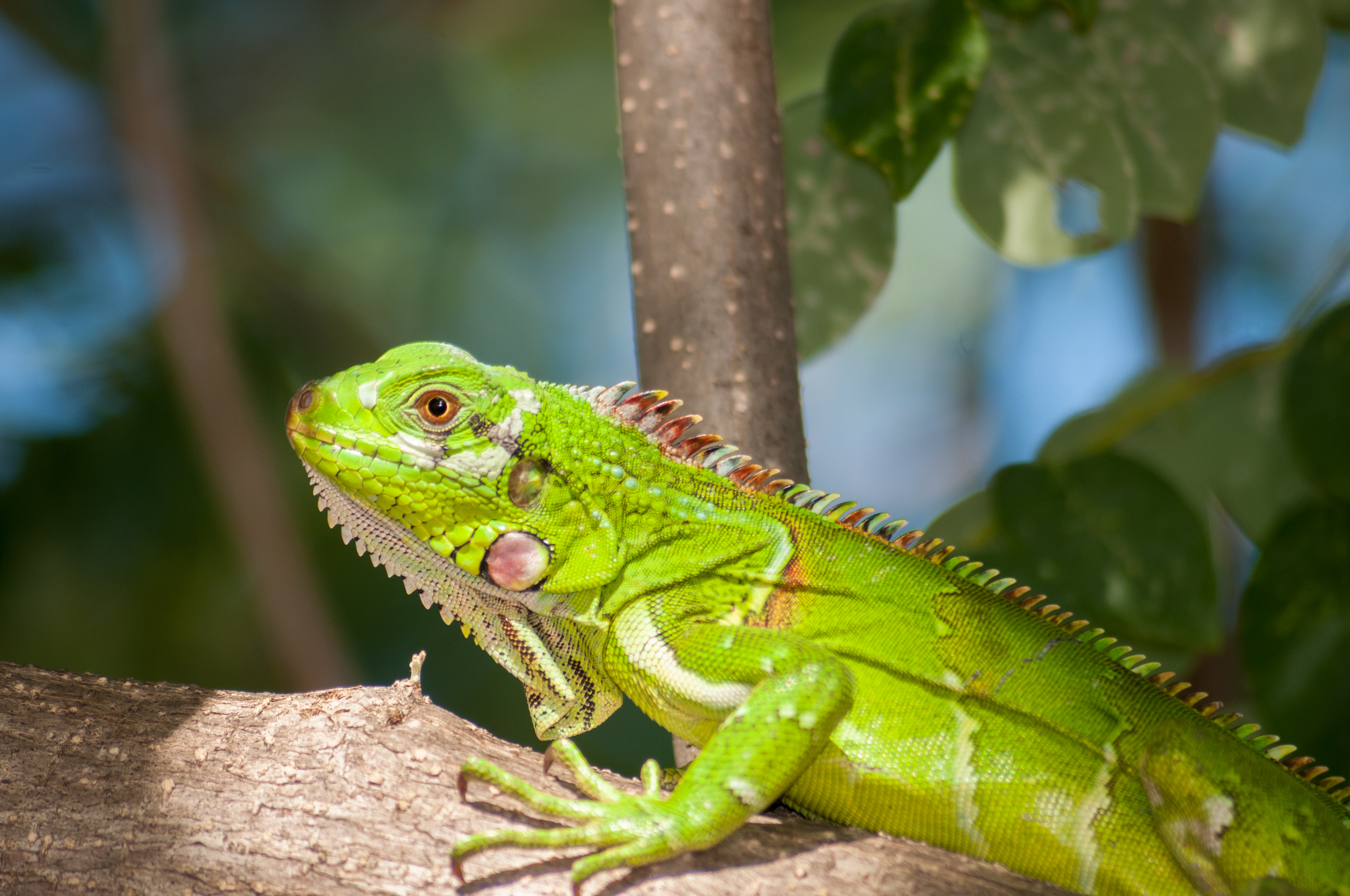
Young green iguana, Margarita Island

Other species of animals found are eastern cottontails (Sylvilagus floridanus) and several species of reptiles, such as green iguanas (which were once more common on Margarita, but hunting for the consumption of their eggs and meat has made them rare on Margarita), rattlesnakes, coral snakes, and anole lizards. Many species of birds can be found and seen in many places on the island, such as the paraulata llanera, or tropical mockingbird (Mimus gilvus), the Carib grackle or llanero (Quiscalus lugubris), the scaled dove (Columbina squammata), the spectacled thrush (Turdus nudigenis), the glaucous tanager (Thraupis glaucocolpa), red-crowned woodpecker (Melanerpes rubricapillus), the tucusito hummingbird (Leucippus fallax), the emerald hummingbird or mellisbanero (Chlorostilbon), barred antshrike (Thamnophilus doliatus), the rufous-vented chachalaca or guacharaca (Ortalis ruficauda ruficauda), the Venezuelan turpial (Icterus icterus), the vermillion cardinal or cardenalito (Cardinalis phoeniceus), partridges, turtledoves, and the yellow-shouldered amazon or cotorra margariteña (Amazona barbadensis), a natural symbol of the island.

It is also possible to find species such as the giant centipede (Scolopendra gigantea).

=== Flora ===
The semi-arid climate of the Nueva Esparta state is one of the fundamental reasons for the evolution of two main types of vegetation. In the state, there are abundant areas of tropical vegetation on the slopes of the main hills of the island.

- Species include: puy, curari, araguaney, egg yolk, naked Indian, Indian hide (Bursera simaruba); torco, white spoon (Croton xanthochloros); copey (Clusia major), Maytenus karstenil, Coccoloba coronata, cascarón (Machaerium robinifolium), lemongrass (Ximenia americana) Neea anisophyla, Ouratea guildingii and Chionanthus caribaea.

=== Natural resources ===
The State stands out for its scenic resources, represented in natural landscapes, such as lagoons, beaches, hills, salt flats and wind formations, all of great tourist potential. However, it does not have large energy resources, and its availability of minerals is limited to the existence of gravel, sand, limestone, dolomite, chromite, manganese, talc and stone. The vegetation and natural resources of the state are few for being an arid zone in the middle of the Caribbean Sea, but plants such as cacti and palm trees are seen in warm areas.

== Politics and government ==
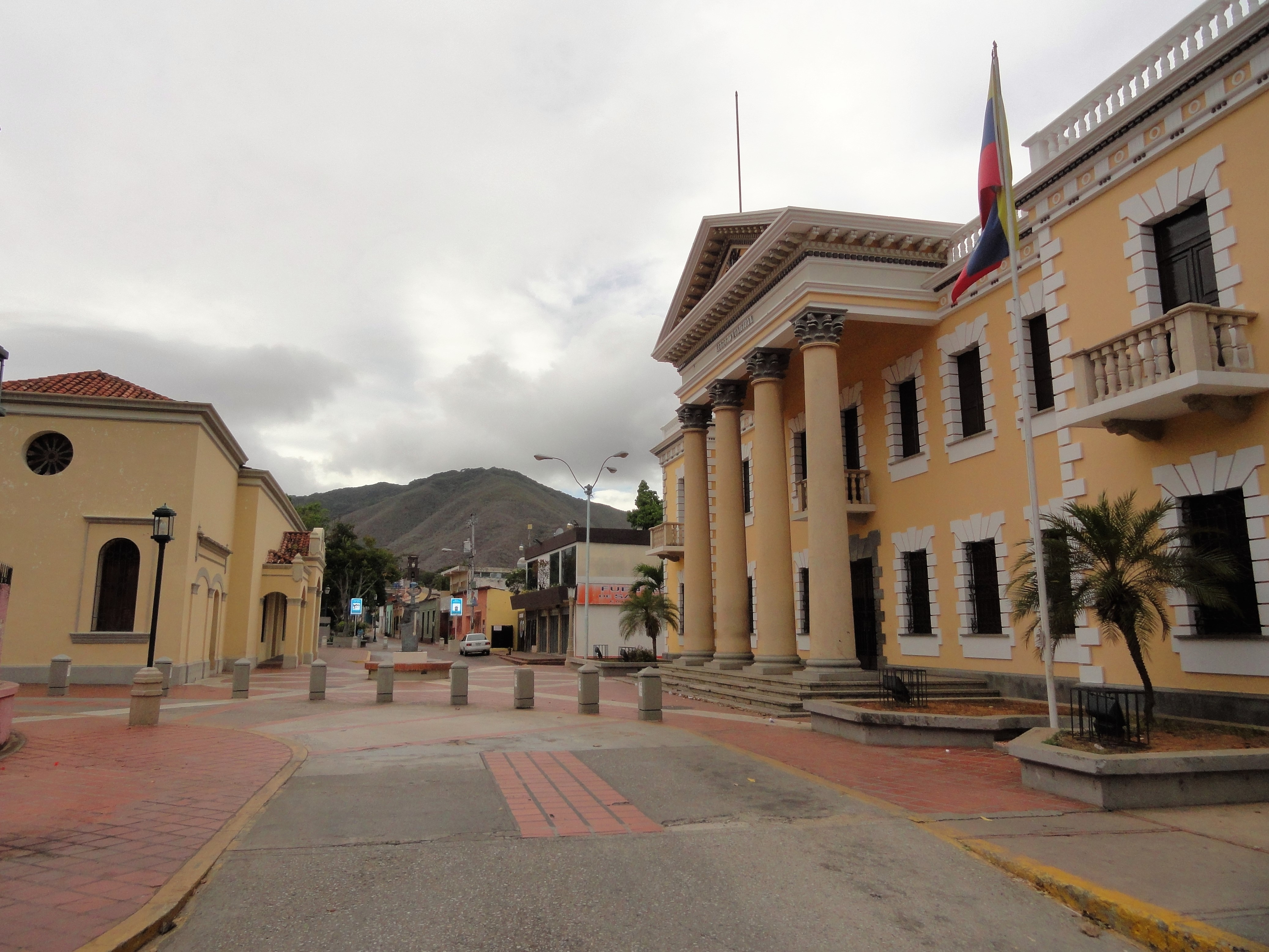
Nueva Esparta Legislative Palace

The state is autonomous and equal in political terms to the rest of the federation, organizes its administration and its public powers through the Constitution of the Nueva Esparta State, dictated by the former Legislative Assembly published in the Official Gazette of the Nueva Esparta State, Extraordinary Number, dated July 6, 1993, and its Amendment No. 1 published in the Official Gazette of the Nueva Esparta State, Extraordinary Number E-060 dated December 29, 2000.

=== Executive power ===
He is represented by the Governor of Nueva Esparta and a group of State Secretaries of his trust. The Governor is elected by the people by direct and secret vote for a period of four years and with the possibility of immediate re-election for additional periods, being in charge of the state administration.

Until 1989, the governors were appointed by the National Executive Power, since then several parties have alternated in the government of the State:

Since 2002, the governor was General Carlos Mata Figueroa of the PSUV. On October 15, 2017, Alfredo Díaz was elected from the Democratic Action party.

=== Legislative power ===
The state legislature rests with the Legislative Council of Nueva Esparta, a unicameral regional parliament, elected by the people by direct and secret vote every four years and may be re-elected for new consecutive periods, under a system of proportional representation of the population of the state and its municipalities, the State has 5 deputies, of which 4 belong to the opposition and 1 to the government.

=== State Police ===
The State has its own police force called INEPOL on the basis of what is established in the National Constitution of Venezuela, 19 being the one in charge of regional security and organized under the legal figure of the Autonomous Institute. It was created in 1970 and depends on the Government of the State Nueva Esparta since 1989, currently remains attached to the Directorate of Civil Protection and Public Safety of the state.

== Economy ==
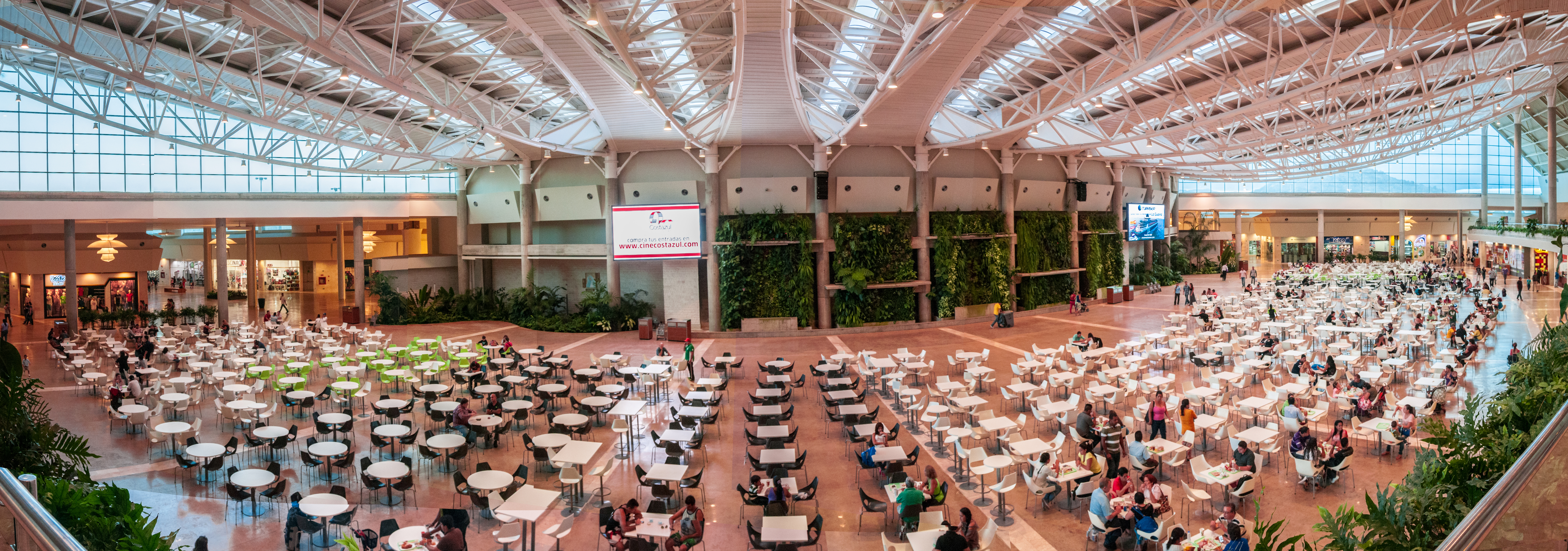
Parque Costazul mall, Margarita Island

Trade predominates, due to the condition of Puerto Libre (established in 1971 by presidential decree) and its link with local tourism. The tourist activity has stimulated the construction industry, as evidenced by the existence of hotels, restaurants, holiday homes and entertainment centers, as part of an infrastructure that revalue this area for visitors of both national and international origin. Fishing has allowed the production of: needle, anchovy, tuna, snapper, corocoro, lamparosa, carite, torito, lisa, catfish, cazón, vaquita, horse mackerel, picua and sardine (shellfish); shrimp and lobster (crustacean); clam, squid, chipichipi, guacuco, pearl casing and oysters (mollusks). Agriculture is also seen as a complementary economic activity, especially on the island of Margarita, where the cultivation of eggplant, corn, melon, paprika, pinilla, sweet pepper and tomato stand out, as well as poultry farming, goats and pigs.

In recent years, there has been an increase in the resident populations of the three islands, mainly in Margarita. The Nueva Esparta State has become a place of rest and escape for the inhabitants of the great cities of the center of the country, being a popular tourist destination of Venezuela.

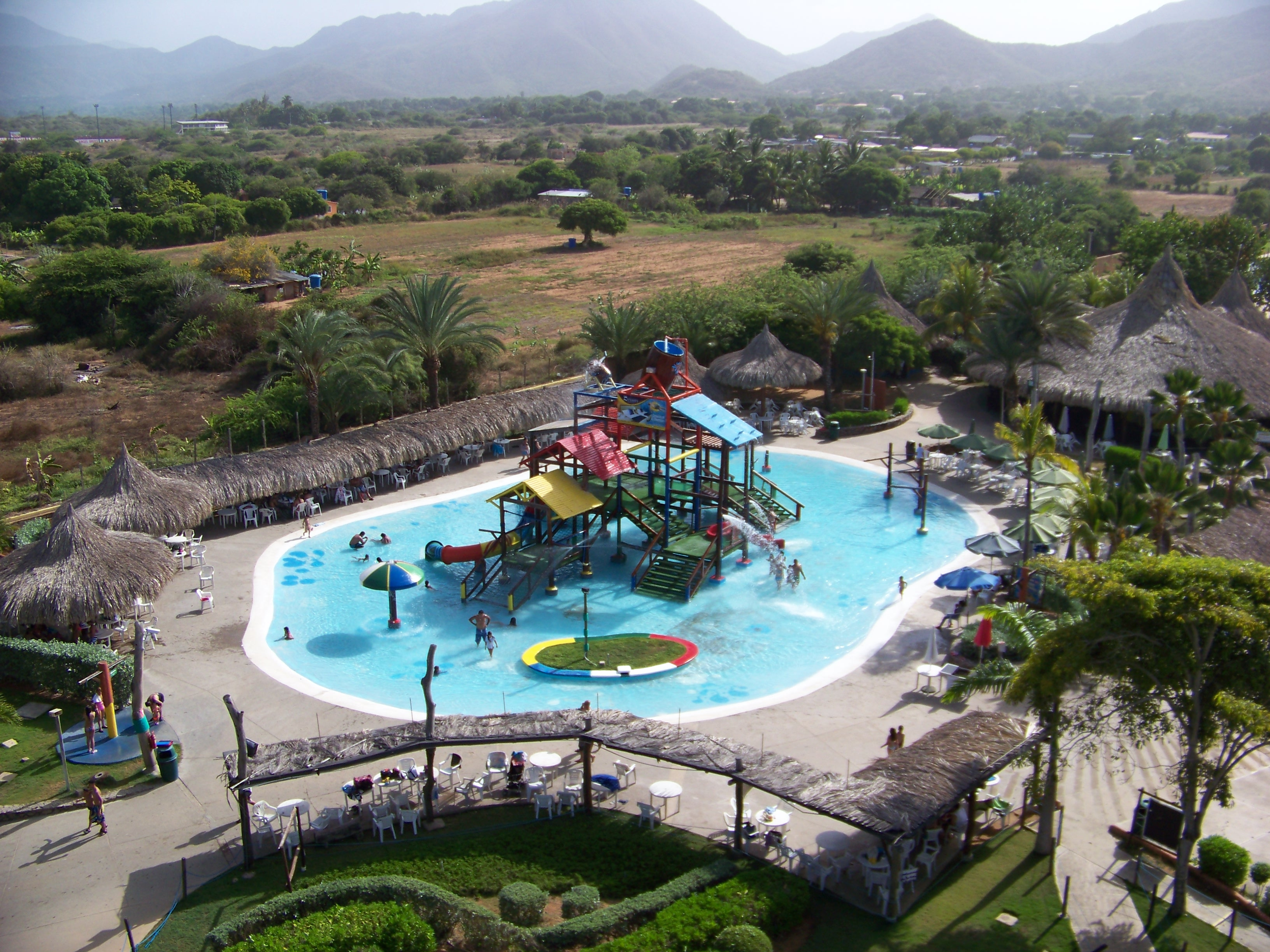
Parque el Agua, tourism is a basic activity for the economy of Nueva Esparta

=== Main shopping centers ===
- Parque Costazul: The largest and most modern shopping center on the island and the third largest in the country
- Sambil Margarita: it is a shopping center with a variety of shops and many alternatives for natives and visitors.
- La Redoma Shopping Center
- La Vela Mall in Porlamar
- Rattan Plaza Shopping Center in Pampatar

== Tourism ==
The region, due to its Caribbean beaches, is one of the most visited tourist attractions in Venezuela. The islands have beaches with conditions for surfing, diving, windsurfing, kitesurfing and other water sports, as well as historic colonial towns. In recent years, several projects have been planned to boost tourism, such as the Puerto la Mar Cruise Port, the expansion of the Santiago Mariño Caribbean International Airport, the Punta Ballena Lighthouse (in cooperation with the Venezuelan Navy), among others. On the island, there are several old Spanish fortifications (castles, forts and fortresses), which are considered national heritage.

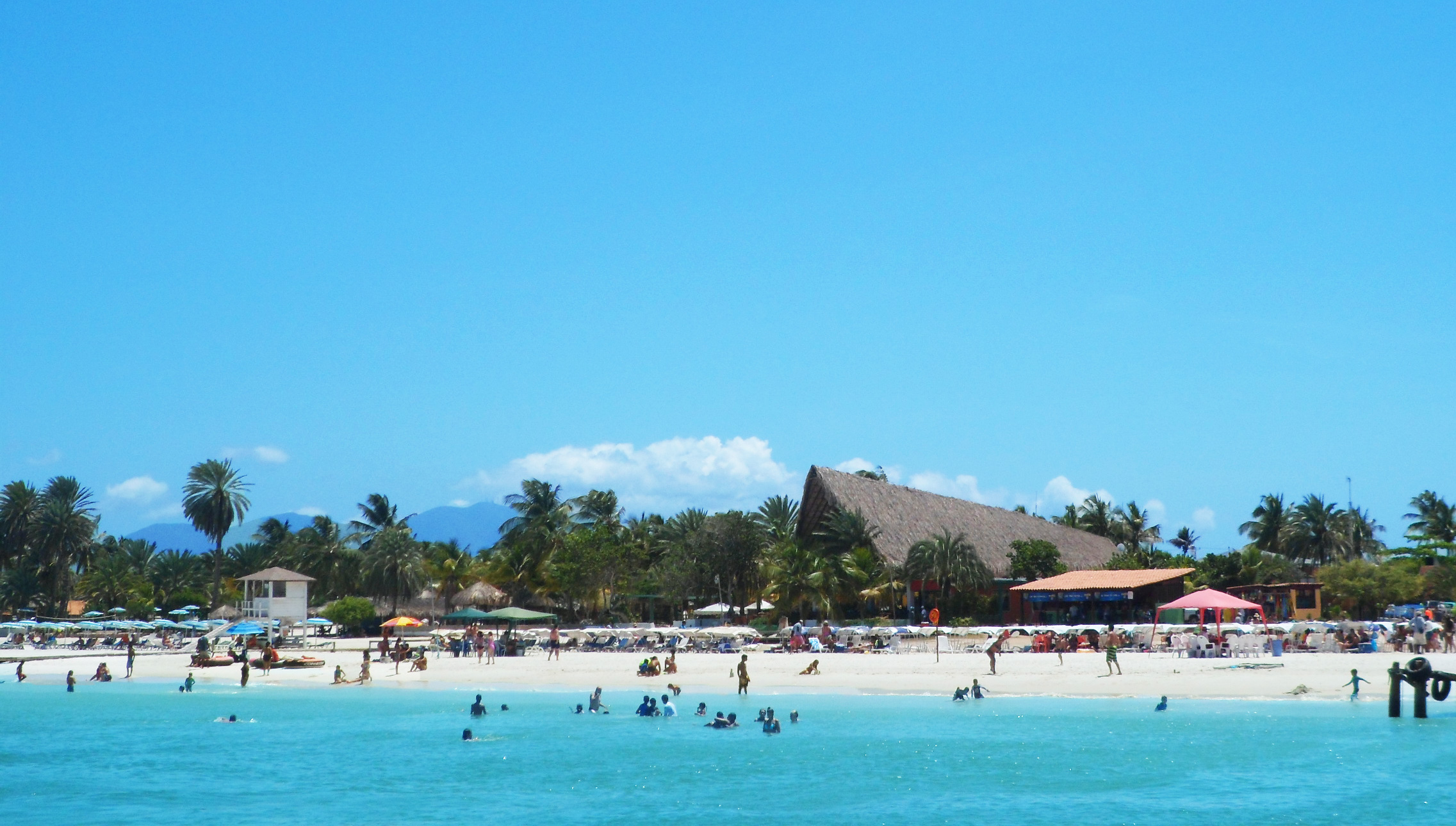
Coche Island

Coche Island has exceptional conditions for quality selective tourism. To the west of the island the conditions for windsurfing and kiteboarding (strong winds of more than 50 km/h with a sea without waves) are extremely favourable. The effect of strong and continuous breezes on the island can be seen due to the sparse vegetation. On the roads, cycling can be practiced.

The island has a good tourism infrastructure, with a good range of hotels and excursions that offer, both water and land tours.

=== Natural heritage ===
- Tetas de Maria Guevara natural monument: it consists of two twin hills located in the center of Margarita Island, near the La Restinga lagoon, in the Nueva Esparta state in northeastern Venezuela. These hills are used as a reference point by local fishermen.
- Cerro El Copey National Park: protected area located east of Margarita Island, in the highest mountainous region of the Nueva Esparta State in Venezuela. It was created in 1974 with the purpose of protecting an outstanding physiographic feature with an ecosystem comprising several plant formations, high levels of endemism and the only permanent water sources on the island. It is surrounded by desert plains, but has green forests and montane grasslands that feed on the humidity provided by trade winds.

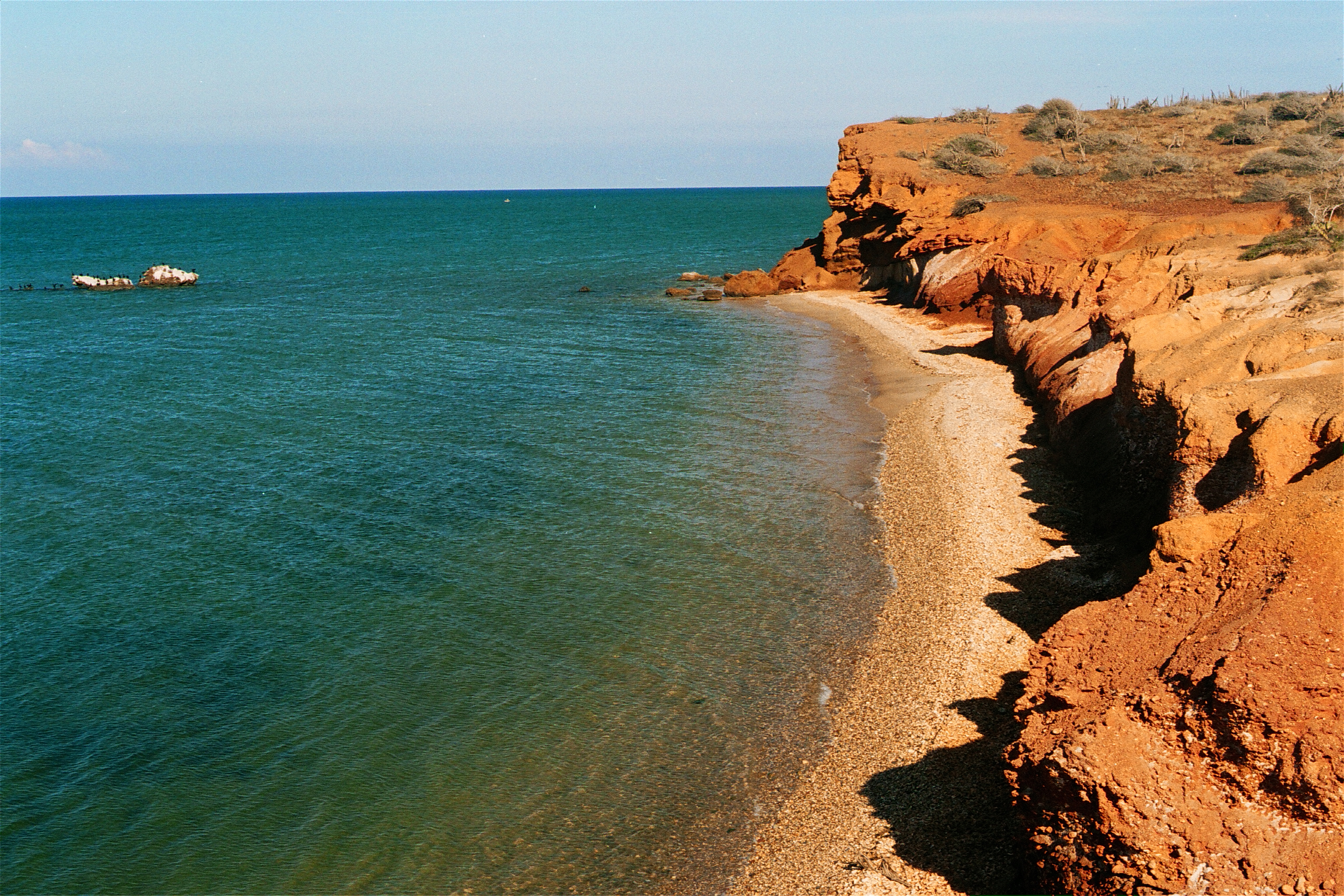
El Amor Beach, Nueva Esparta State

- Laguna de la Restinga: located in the Nueva Esparta State in Venezuela. This park forms the union between the eastern and western part of Margarita Island, being located in the municipality of Tubores, This lagoon is mainly made up of mangroves. There is a service of walks around the lagoon in boats with outboard motor (tapaítos), where they take and bring tourists to the beach.
- Laguna de Las Marites Natural Monument: declared by decree No. 1.633, dated February 27, 1974. It comprises an area of 3,680 hectares, is located south of Margarita, and is part of the municipalities García, Díaz and Mariño. It is a shallow lagoon and meets the sea through a narrow mouth. It hosts bird species such as gannets and earwigs; previously, caimans and caracaras can also be found here. Many mangroves line the lagoon.
- Macanao Peninsula: occupies the westernmost portion of Margarita Island. On November 20, 1962, the beaches, lagoons and mountains of the Isthmus of the Restinga, Bay of Boca de Boca, were declared of public interest.

=== Cultural heritage ===
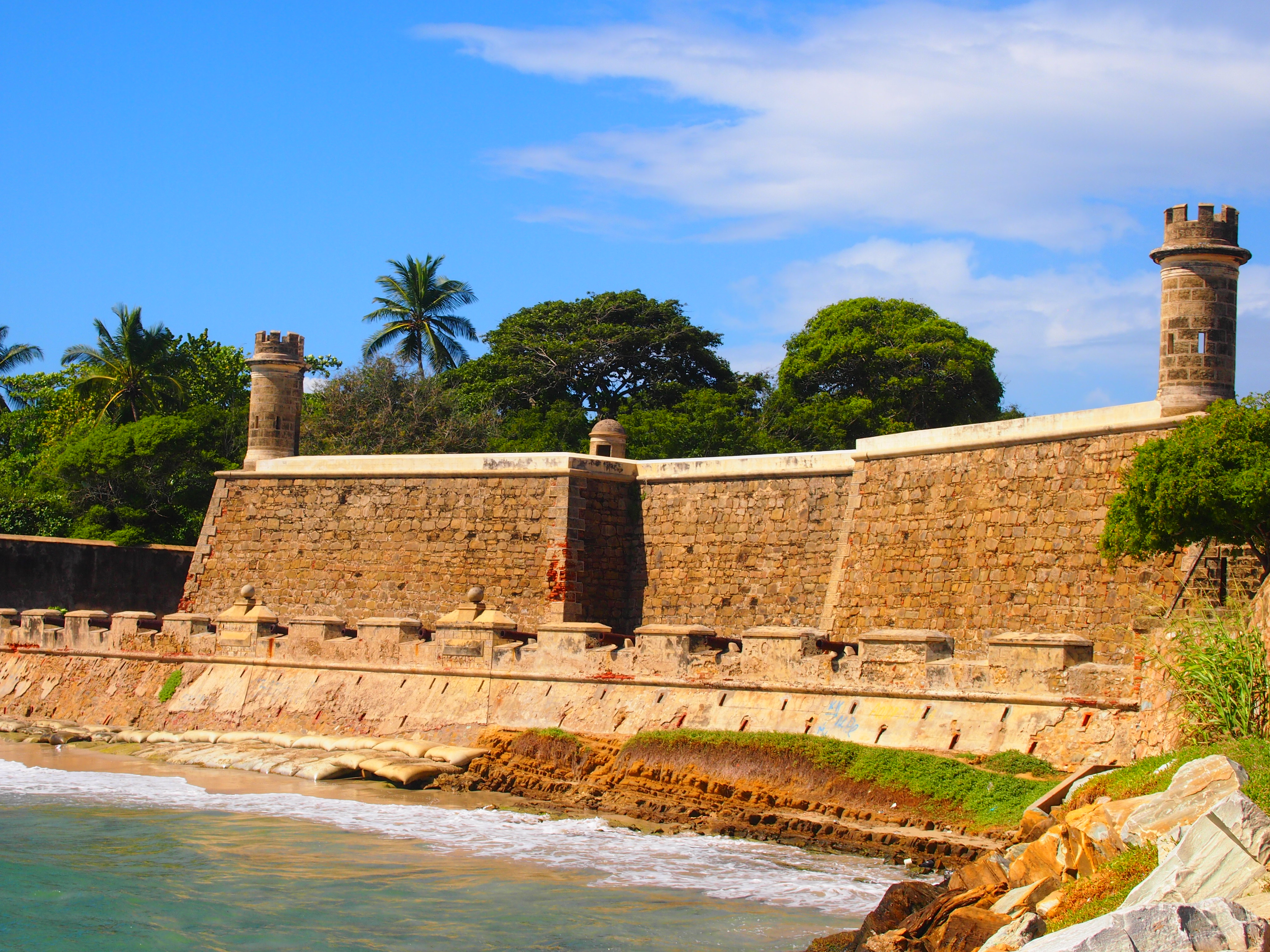
San Carlos de Borromeo Fortress in Pampatar

- Basilica of Our Lady of El Valle: Gothic-style Catholic Church located in El Valle del Espiritu Santo, on Margarita Island, her name is in honor of the patron saint of that town and the Venezuelan Navy: the Virgen del Valle . After the San Nicolás de Bari church was founded, it was declared a Minor Basilica of the Nueva Esparta State, on September 8, 1955, from that date its patron celebrations are celebrated; beginning with the descent of the Virgin, on September 8 of each year.
- Sanctuary of the Holy Christ of the Good Journey in Pampatar: patron of the Maneiro municipality and the fishermen.
- Church of San Nicólas de Bari, in the center of Porlamar.
- Los Robles Church: Built in 1738, it is dedicated to the Virgen de la Pilarica, whose image of gold, according to legend, was donated by the Spanish queen Juana la Loca.
- General Museum House in Chief Santiago Marino: located behind the square of the Basilica of El Valle. It is the place where General Santiago Mariño was born.
- Diocesan Museum: where the relics donated to the virgin for the favors received and the costumes embroidered with pearls and silver threads by the hands of the devout women of the town are kept with great zeal.
- Fort of Santiago de La Caranta: at the other end of Pampatar Bay are the ruins of this fort built between 1586 and 1595. It was destroyed in an attack by Dutch pirates in 1626.
- San Carlos de Borromeo Fortress: there is no precise documentation to fix the date when the cult of the Blessed Christ of the Good Journey begins, however; it can be said that even in the year of 1748 when the temple was finished building, the Patron Saint San Carlos de Borromeo was worshiped. Protecting the bay of Pampatar, is this castle, the most important of Margarita Island. Its construction on plans of the military engineer Don Juan Betín, was in charge of Captain Carlos Navarro, who baptizes him. It was built between 1664 and 1684.
- Santa Rosa de la Eminencia castle
- Francisco Narváez Museum of Contemporary art
- Ramón Vásquez Brito House of Culture
- Marine Museum of Boca del Río: a non-profit private foundation and sponsored by Polar Group, which has a variety of samples of fish and other marine species, both live and dissected, including turtles, sharks, and others sea animals in special pools
- Museo del Mar in Punta de Piedras, collection of archaeological materials from Cubagua and other potentially pertinent materials to be examined.
- Museo de La Asunción, collection of materials from Nueva Cádiz de Cubagua is hold there.

=== Featured beaches ===
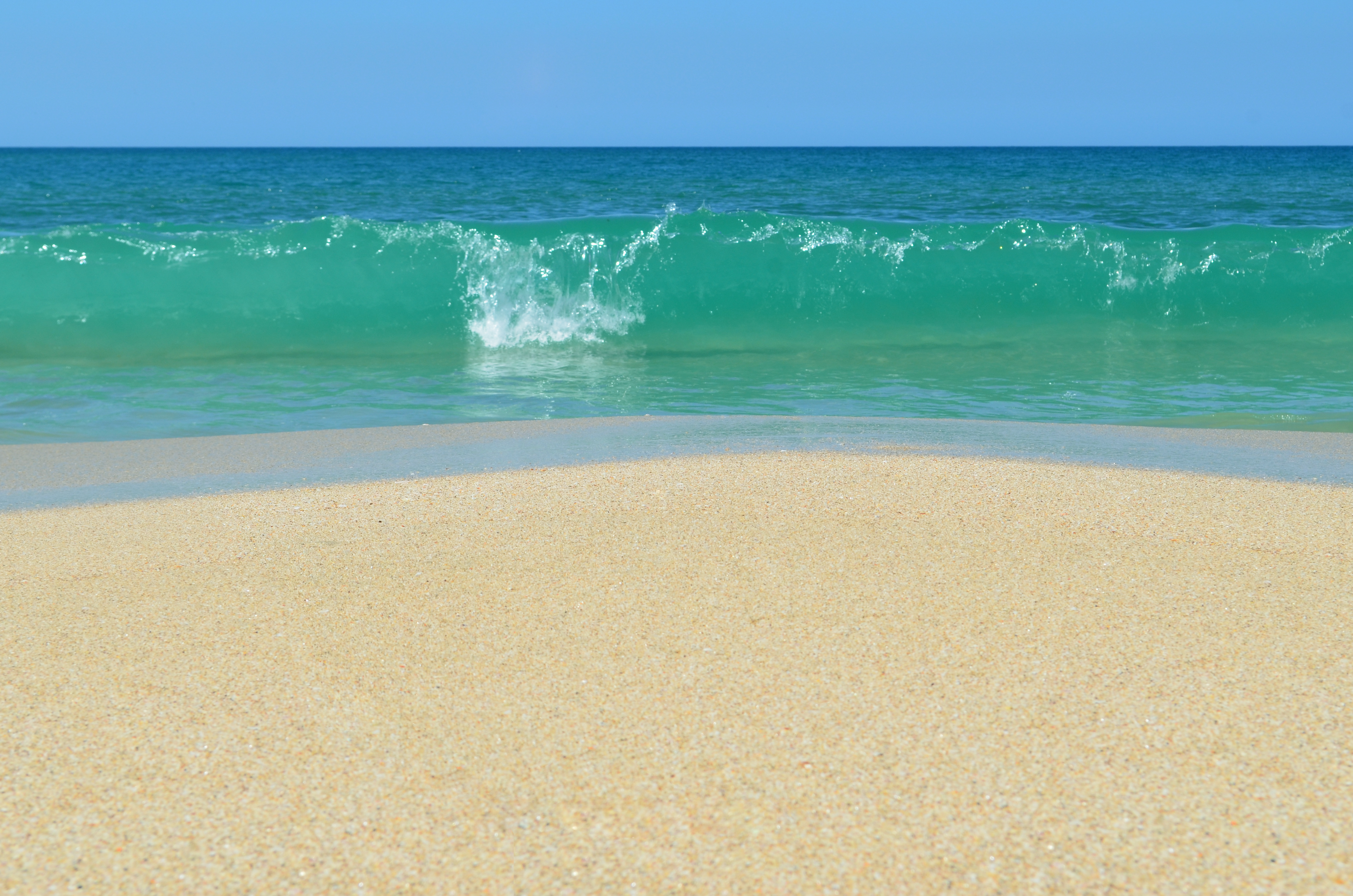
Pedro González Beach, Margarita Island

- El Amor Beach, on the Coche Island
- Playa El Agua (the most famous and busiest on Margarita Island)
- Playa Parguito
- Playa Puerto Cruz
- El Tirano
- Manzanillo Beach
- Guacuco Beach (the most popular in the Arismendi Municipality)
- Playa El Yaque
- Playa Caribe
- Boca Victoria Beach
- El Manglillo Beach
- La Isleta Beach
- Moreno Beach: Beach located in a town called Moreno. Name given by the first settlers of the city, descendants of the Moreno family.
- El Ángel Beach: It is located in an isolated area between two rocky hills. His name was taken from a naturally sculpted rock that resembled an angel's prayer.
- La Caranta Beach: located near the Fort of Santiago de La Caranta
- Playa Punta Arenas
- Valdez beach
- Bella Vista beach
- El Morro beach (Concorde)

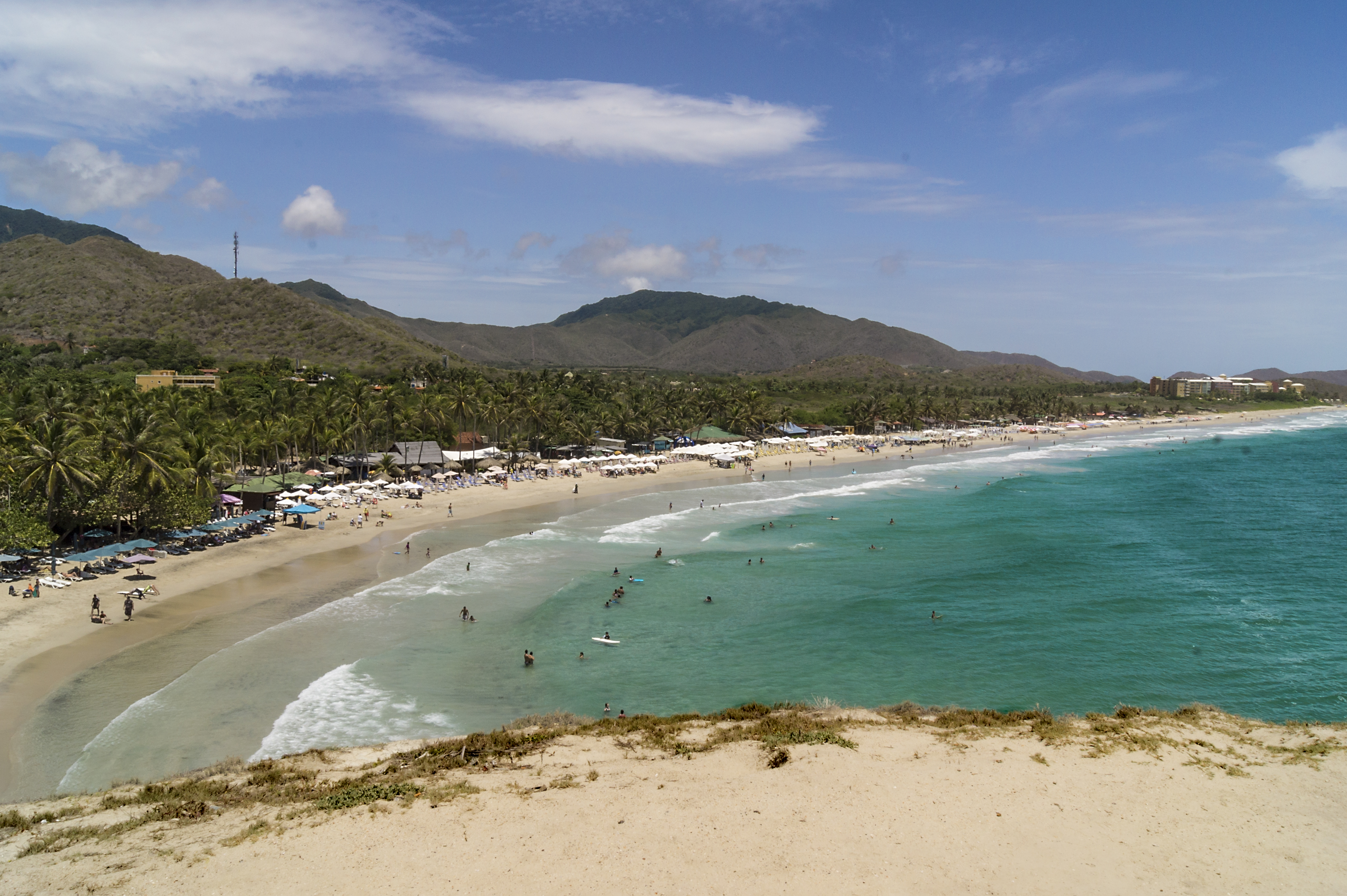
Playa Parguito

=== Parks ===
- El Agua water park: which is the pioneer of its kind throughout Venezuela.
- Diverland: a park of mechanical attractions with different alternatives for the enjoyment of adults and children in the Municipality of Maneiro.
- Waterland Marine World
- Hacienda Macanao
- The Kingdom of Musipan (Musipán El Reino), in El Yaque next to the Musipan Villas Hotel

== Demographics ==
Historical population
Year	Pop.	±% p.a.
1873	30,983	—
1881	37,583	+2.44%
1891	40,197	+0.67%
1920	56,035	+1.15%
1926	69,392	+3.63%
1936	73,375	+0.56%
1941	69,195	−1.17%
1950	75,899	+1.03%
1961	89,492	+1.51%
1971	118,830	+2.88%
1981	197,198	+5.20%
1990	263,748	+3.28%
2001	373,851	+3.22%
2011	491,610	+2.78%
Source: "XIV CENSO NACIONAL DE POBLACIÓN Y VIVIENDA - Resultados por Entidad Federal y Municipio del Estado Nueva Esparta" (PDF). Instituto Nacional de Estadística.

Its density exceeds the national average and is one of the highest in the country, due to constant population growth since the 40s, only slowed by the decline in birth from the 60s. Particularly, the decree of Free Port, promulgated in 1971, caused a drastic increase in immigration. Most of the population is grouped in the municipalities most closely associated with the commercial activity emanating from tourism. The Mariño Municipality, for example, concentrates more than 23.7% of the State's inhabitants, and its capital, Porlamar, is the largest economic center on the island of Margarita. It is followed in importance by the municipalities García and Maneiro, which are neighbors of Porlamar, a city that, given the physical impossibility of continuing to grow, has expanded towards them. Other important populations are Villa Rosa, Pampatar, San Juan Bautista, La Asunción, Paraguachí, Juangriego and El Pilar (Los Robles).

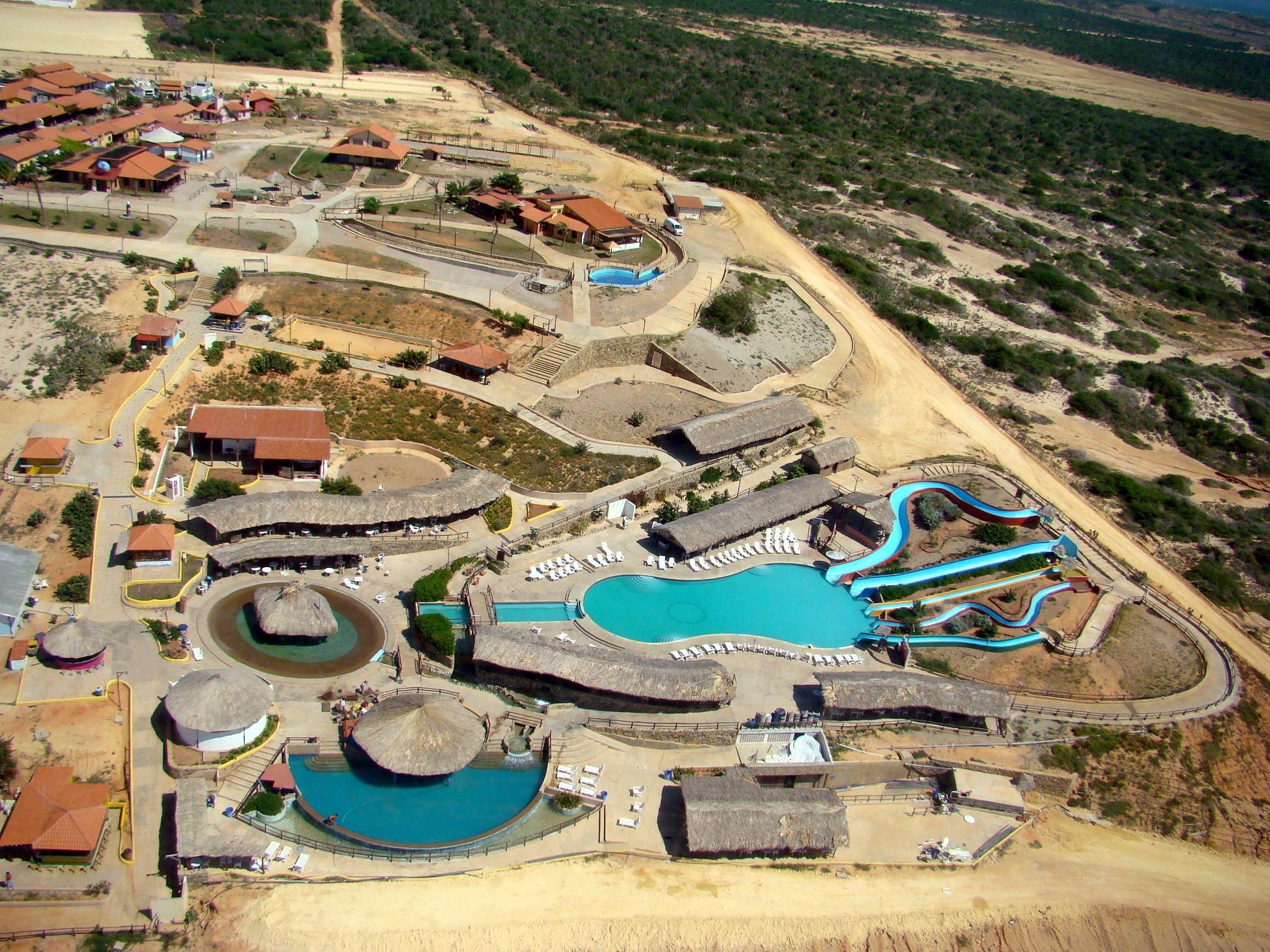
The Kingdom of Musipan Park

Island	Population Estimated	Area	Density	Largest location
Margarita Island	400.000 (2010)	1071 km^{2}	373.48	Porlamar
Coche Island	8.756 (2010)	55 km^{2}	159,20	San Pedro de Coche
Cubagua Island	71 (2007)	24 km^{2}	2,95	Playa Charagato

Statistics according to the 2001 census:

- Inhabitants per doctor: 461.
- Life expectancy: 73.61 years.
- Literacy rate: 95.3%.
- School attendance rate: 66.2%.
- Gross birth rate: 23.1 per thousand.
- Gross mortality rate: 4.49 per thousand.

In total: 655,235

=== Ethnography ===
The native inhabitants of Nueva Esparta State were indigenous people of the Waikeri nation, who called the current island of Margarita Paraguachoa ("place where there are fish in abundance"). They were fishermen and farmers, and made canoes, hammocks, bows, arrows, wooden mortars, bamboo tubes to extract palm oil, and clay utensils. Grouped in nomadic tribes ruled by chiefs, firm believers of the eventual advent of a demigod of the color of the sun, the Waikeri provided a friendly reception to the conquerors who arrived at the islands, so they were favored by Spain with the status of free vassals.

=== Main cities and towns ===
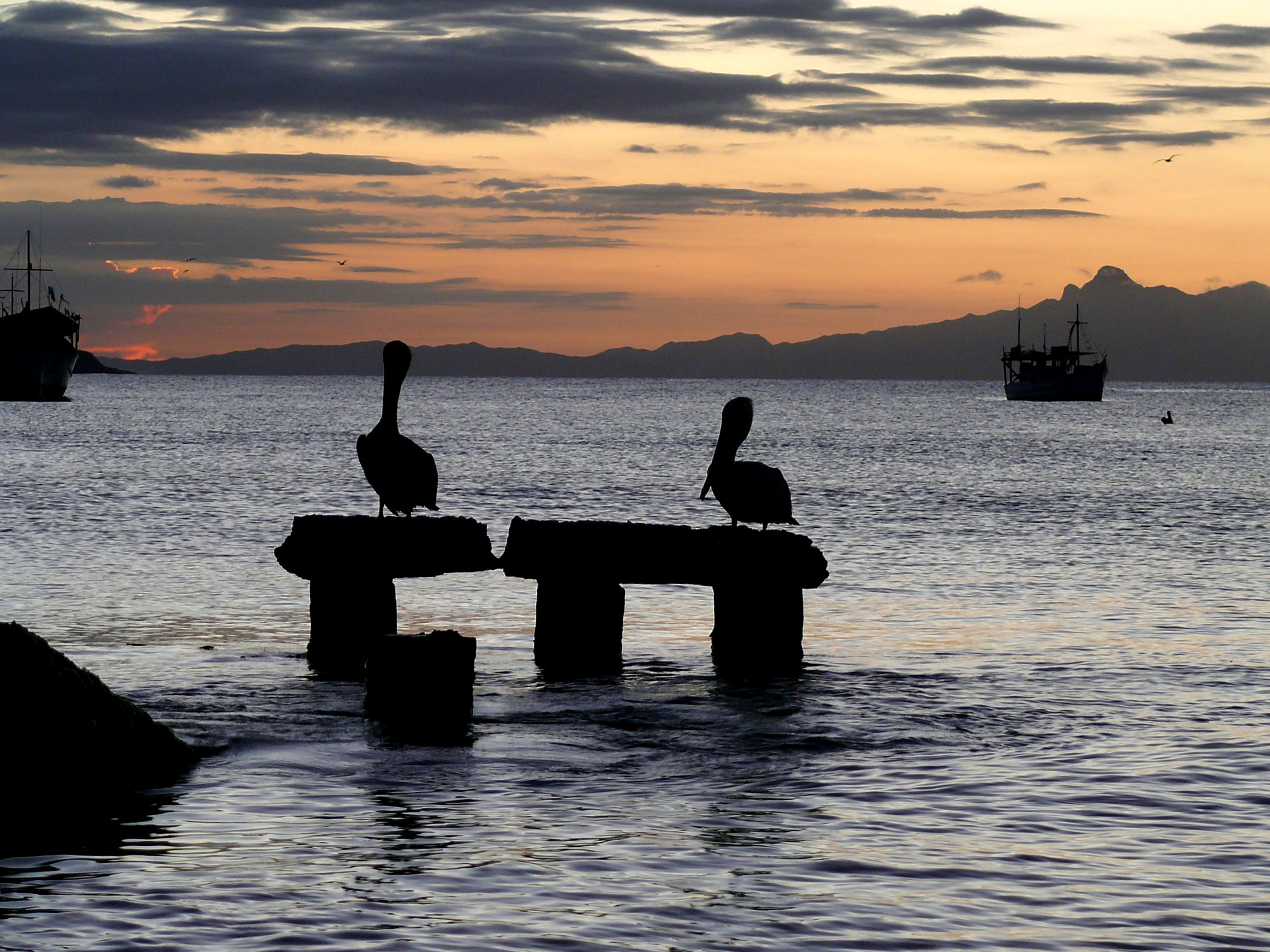
Juan Griego, Marcano Municipality

- Porlamar: The largest city on Margarita Island is Porlamar, known for its shopping centers, shops and good restaurants. About 95,000 people live during the low season in Porlamar, about 195,000, in the high season. It has two beaches in the city.
- Pampatar: It has around 50,000 citizens. Most of the largest shopping centers are in their jurisdiction: Sambil Margarita, Rattan Plaza, AB Shopping Center (Bolivar Avenue), La Vela Shopping Center, CC Parque Costazul and La Redoma. It has several beaches, discos and restaurants. In this city is the San Carlos de Borromeo Fortress, built around 1664 to 1684.
- La Asunción: It is the capital of the Federal State of Nueva Esparta with about 25,000 citizens. It is the seat of the regional government.
- San Pedro de Coche, is a small population, capital of the Villalba municipality, and at the same time economic and social capital of the island of Coche, in the Nueva Esparta state, south of Margarita Island, in northeastern Venezuela.
- Juan Griego is a city of around 45,000 people, it has shopping centers and beaches. La Galera is a fort not far from the city center, where, in the 1820s, a fierce battle for independence was fought.
- Punta de Piedras, it is especially important because it is the town where the ferry terminal that connects the island to the mainland is located. For this reason, it is known as "Margarita's door".
- Punta de Mangle: town located south of Margarita Island, it is called the El Guamache International Port, the PDVSA Fuel Distribution Plant and the Juan Bautista Arismendi Thermoelectric Plant. A number of beaches are also found here, including Beach La Punta (Paraiso), El Oasis Beach (formerly called Los Portillos) and El Morrito Beach. The tip is the southernmost end of the entire island.

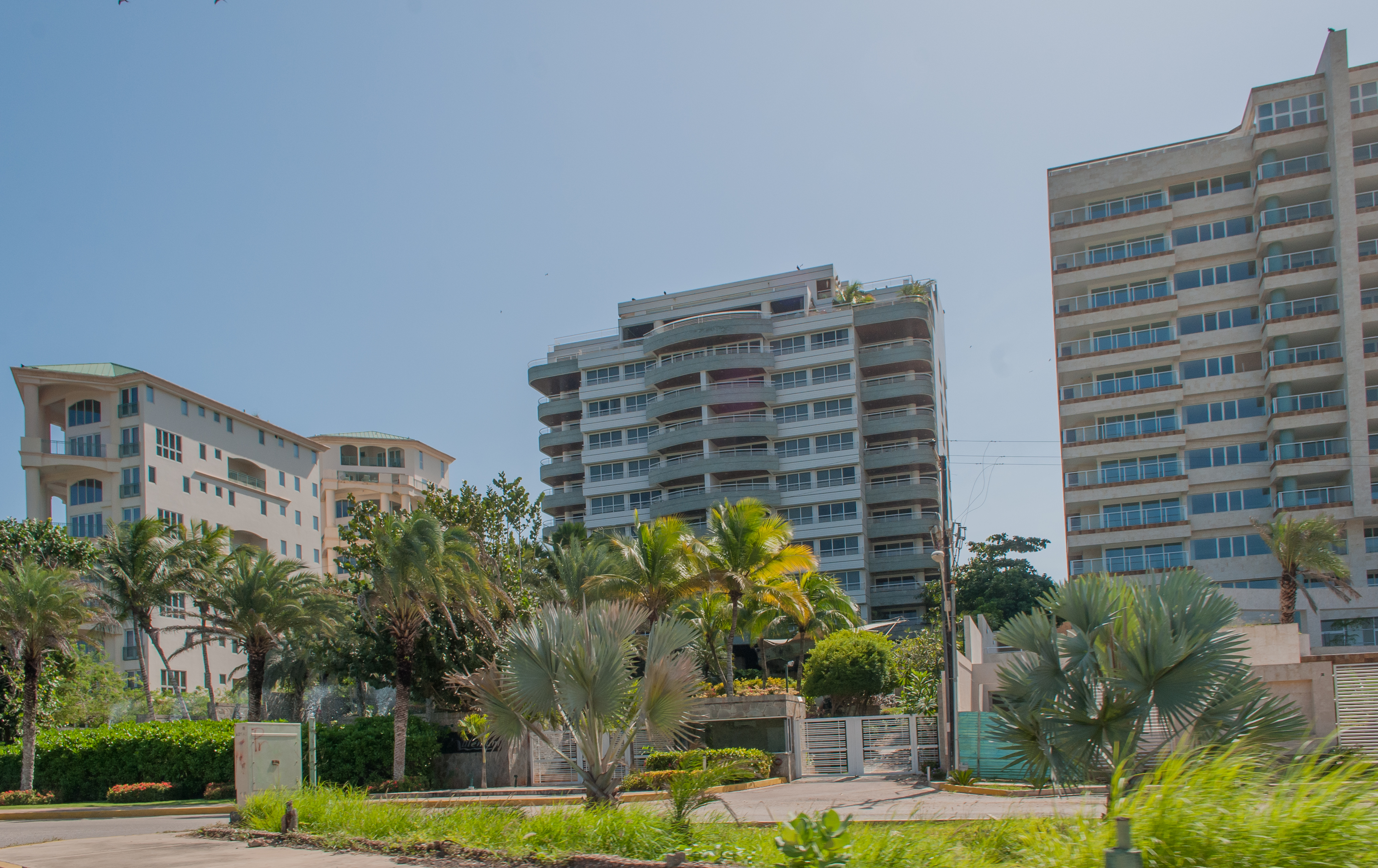
Buildings in El Morro, Margarita Island

- El Valle del Espíritu Santo: "The Valley" as it is known, is the cradle of religious festivities in honor of the Virgin of the Valley, therefore it is the iconic city of Margarita Island.
- La Guardia: Small town located west of eastern Margarita (Paraguachoa), near the Laguna de La Restinga National Park. The town lives mostly from fishing activity. A particular attraction is its sunsets, along with the silhouette formed by the Tetas de Maria Guevara and the mountains of the Macanao Peninsula.
- Caserío Bolívar: This hamlet is also called El Maco de Bolívar or as it is known on the island simply as El Maco. It is a small hamlet dedicated to the handmade manufacture of footwear, since it established immigrant shoemakers from Spain, mainly from Castilla La Vieja.

=== Religion ===
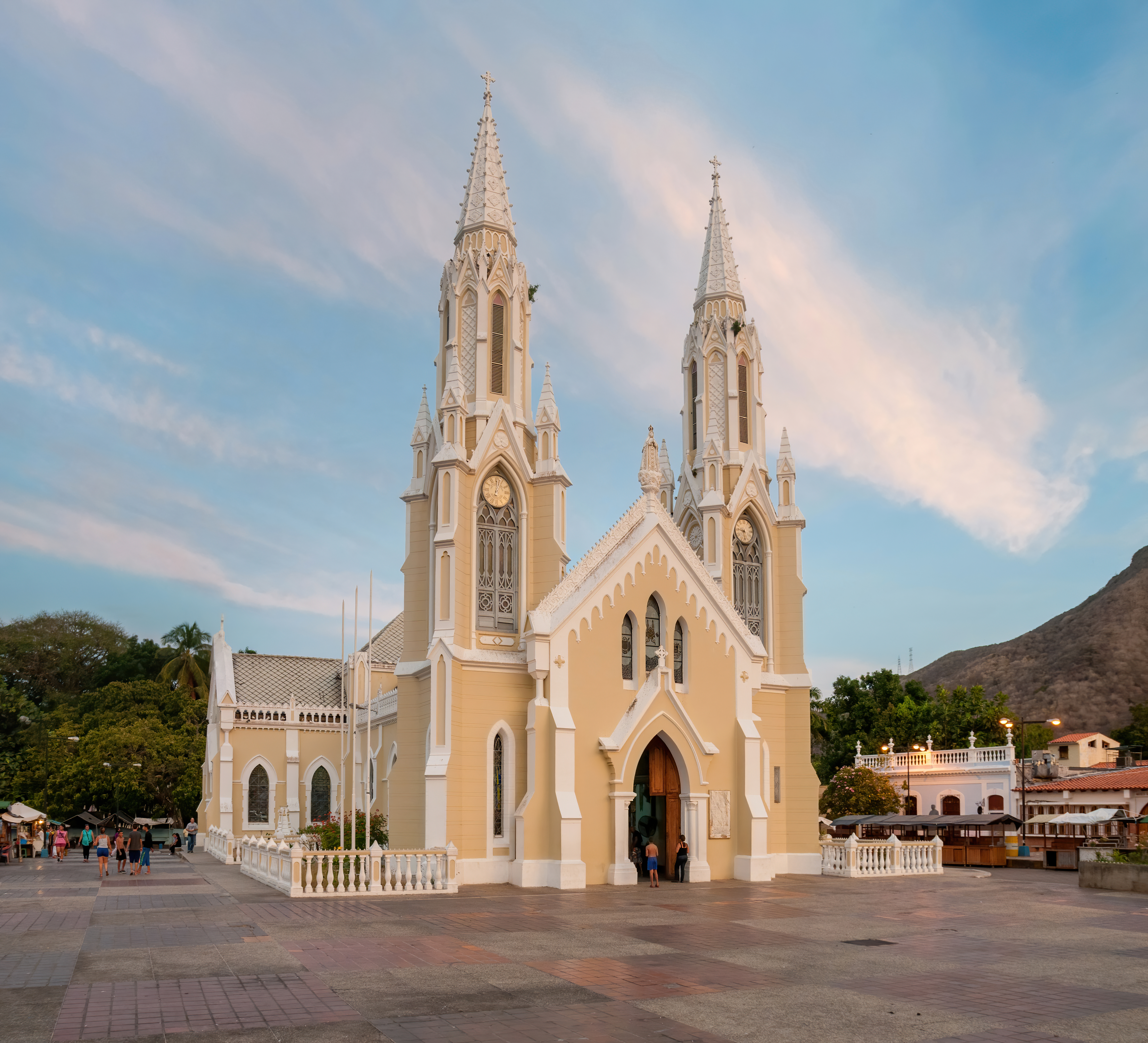
Basilica of Our Lady of El Valle, Margarita Island

In the state, there is a predominantly Catholic population and other Christian branches, evidenced by the churches present in the neo-Spartan State, among the most important are: Basilica of Our Lady of El Valle (in the Valley of the Holy Spirit), La Asunción Cathedral, San Juan Evangelista Church (in Juan Griego), San Juan Parish Church (in San Juan Bautista), San Nicolás de Bari Church (Porlamar), San José de Paraguachi Church, Santa Ana Church in the Gómez Municipality, where Simón Bolívar was declared supreme chief of the Republic and his armies on May 6, 1816, in an assembly held in this church located in the town of Santa Ana del Norte, and other minor churches located in towns, such as: Punta de Piedras, Porlamar, Pampatar and practically in all the towns of the island. There are also a variety of religions on the island, among them the Muslim and the Jews.

=== Race and ethnicity ===
According to the 2011 Census, the racial composition of the population was:

Racial composition	Population	%
Mestizo	—N/a	49.1
White	217,828	47.1
Black	11,562	2.5
Other race	—N/a	1.3

== Culture ==
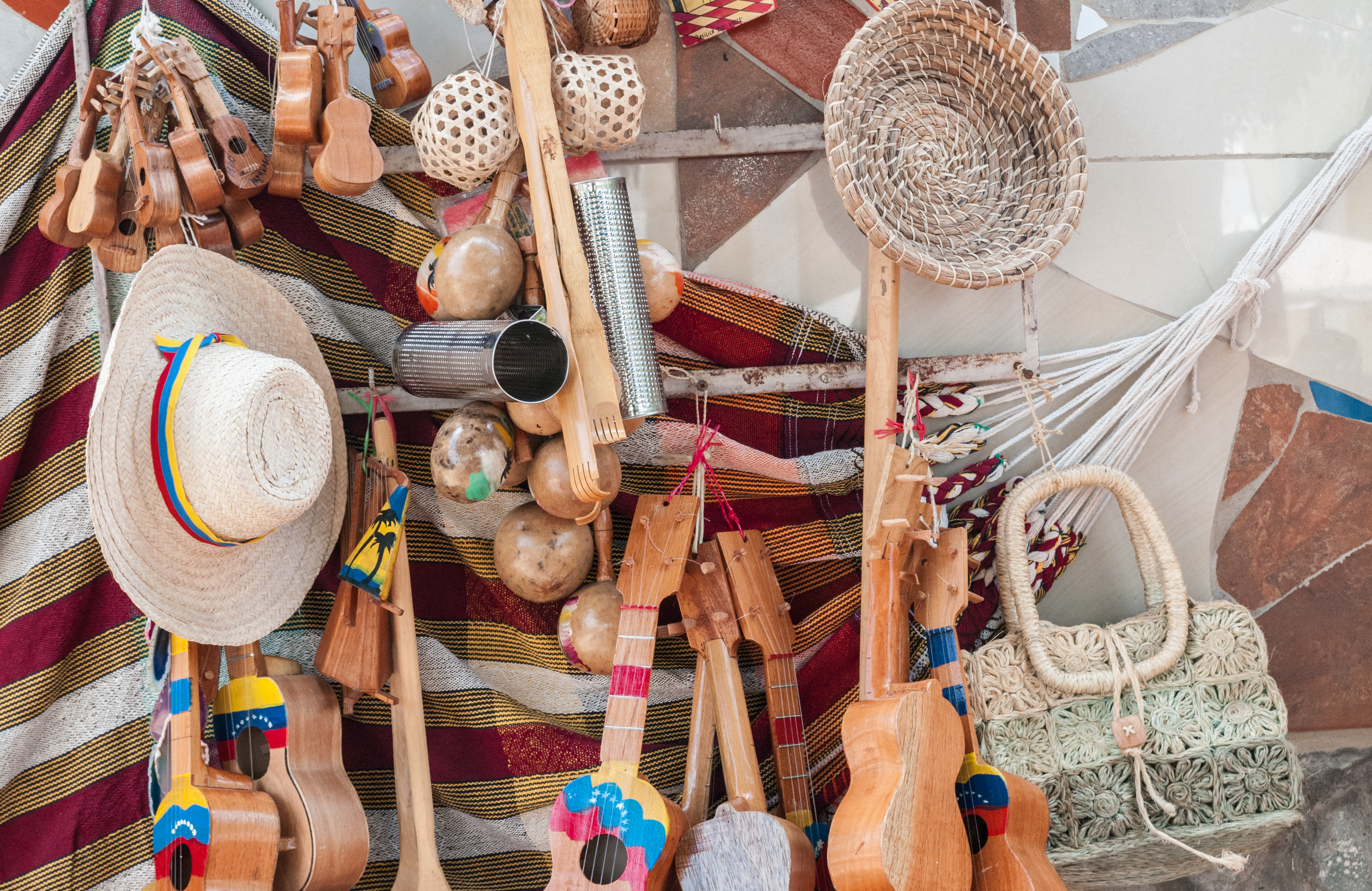
Handicrafts items from Margarita Island, Venezuela

The celebrations in Honor of San José de Paraguachí, Patron of the town, are celebrated from March 19 of each year, day of San José, for a week. This week there are cultural activities, dances, food fairs and the famous procession in Honor of San José, where hundreds of parishioners tour the town.

=== Gastronomy ===
The Nueva Esparta state has a wide range of native dishes, usually made from seafood products or obtained through local sowing. The dogfish cake could be considered as the emblematic dish of the region, it is a cake made with dogfish (shark breeding) and banana (similar to the pooch pie, only that it is made with pooch – rajiform fish – and has more ingredients) . There are also "boiled" fish, which are basically soups made with local fish (catfish, corocoro, snapper, carite, etc.). Among the products of the land used in the local gastronomy, the tomato and ají margariteño stand out.

Another representative dish is the Margariteño pavilion, in which the shredded meat is replaced by shredded and stewed dogfish. Fried or roasted fish are also consumed, among which the corocoro, the snapper, the carite, the Catalan, etc. .; accompanied by arepas or casabe.

Other typical dishes obtained from the sea may be molluscs and crustaceans such as mussels, clams, sea urchins, crab, shrimp, shrimp, etc. Which are prepared in various ways, one of the most common is a soaked dish commonly called phosphorera or stewed with rice, calling it seafood rice.

It is common to observe in many of the streets and squares of the towns of Nueva Esparta, stalls selling cazón empanadas and white cheese, where, the food stalls located in the Market of Los Conejeros, those of the Valley of the Holy Spirit stand out and The Assumption. As for candy store, the piñonate, made in the Parish of San Juan Bautista, coconut kisses, mango jellies and "tits" (frozen) stands out.

=== Crafts ===
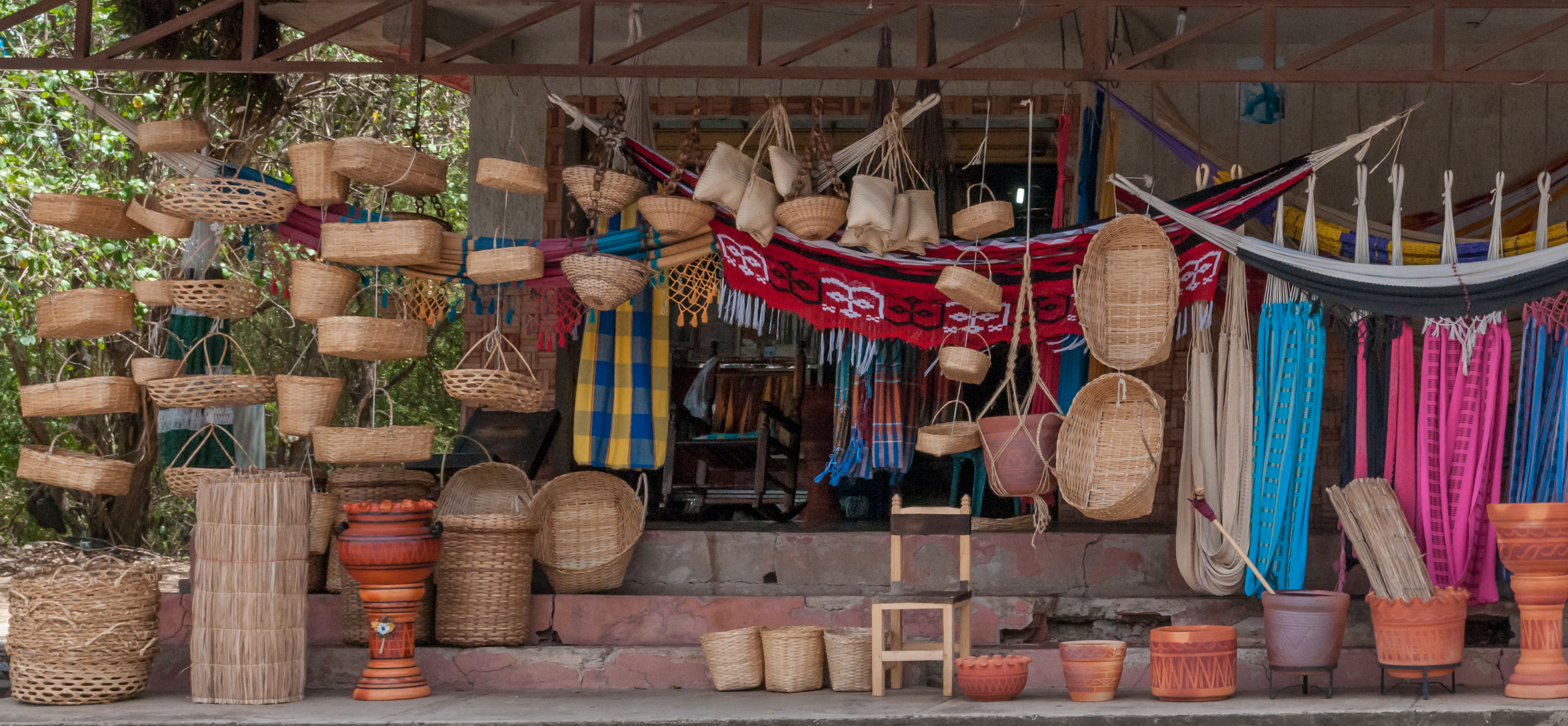
Typical crafts

Since its inception, the Nueva Esparta State has been a region composed of artists. Mainly because of the heritage of pre-Columbian cultures, such as the Waikeri; as well as by artisans who came to the islands mainly from Spain.

Within the craft genre, in the municipality Antonio Díaz, the espadrille, footwear of Hispanic-Arab origin, presents the rubber sole variant. For several years, especially in the decades of the 50s, 60s and 70s, it became a thriving industry, where large businessmen of the espadrille, came to have in their so-called espadrilles called more than 100 people directly and a large amount indirectly; and produced the one used in the state and was taken to others in Venezuela.

The espadrille consists essentially of four parts: the sole, the cut or chapel, the heel and the straps; the first part is extracted from the rubber used by motor vehicles; the rest are made with thread; the cut or cap and heel are made in knitting machines, specially designed for this purpose; and the strips are made manually.

The process to obtain the sole begins by selecting the rubber, which must meet some conditions, this is divided into two parts, when cut exactly through the middle, hence the strips are removed, which can be canvas or rubber, depending on the thickness and utility; on these strips, using pre-made templates of different numbers (from No. 1 the largest to 12 or 13 the smallest), are marked on them and then cut; After trimming, they are drawn with very special knives (plotters), which indicates where the gaps will be made, this task corresponds to the specialist in using the pin, a knife used for this purpose.

After the sole is prepared, the bonding process is followed, which consists of adhering the cut and heel to the sole with thread which is added beeswax, to make it more resistant, after this, the heel is joined and The cut with the strips.

== Education ==
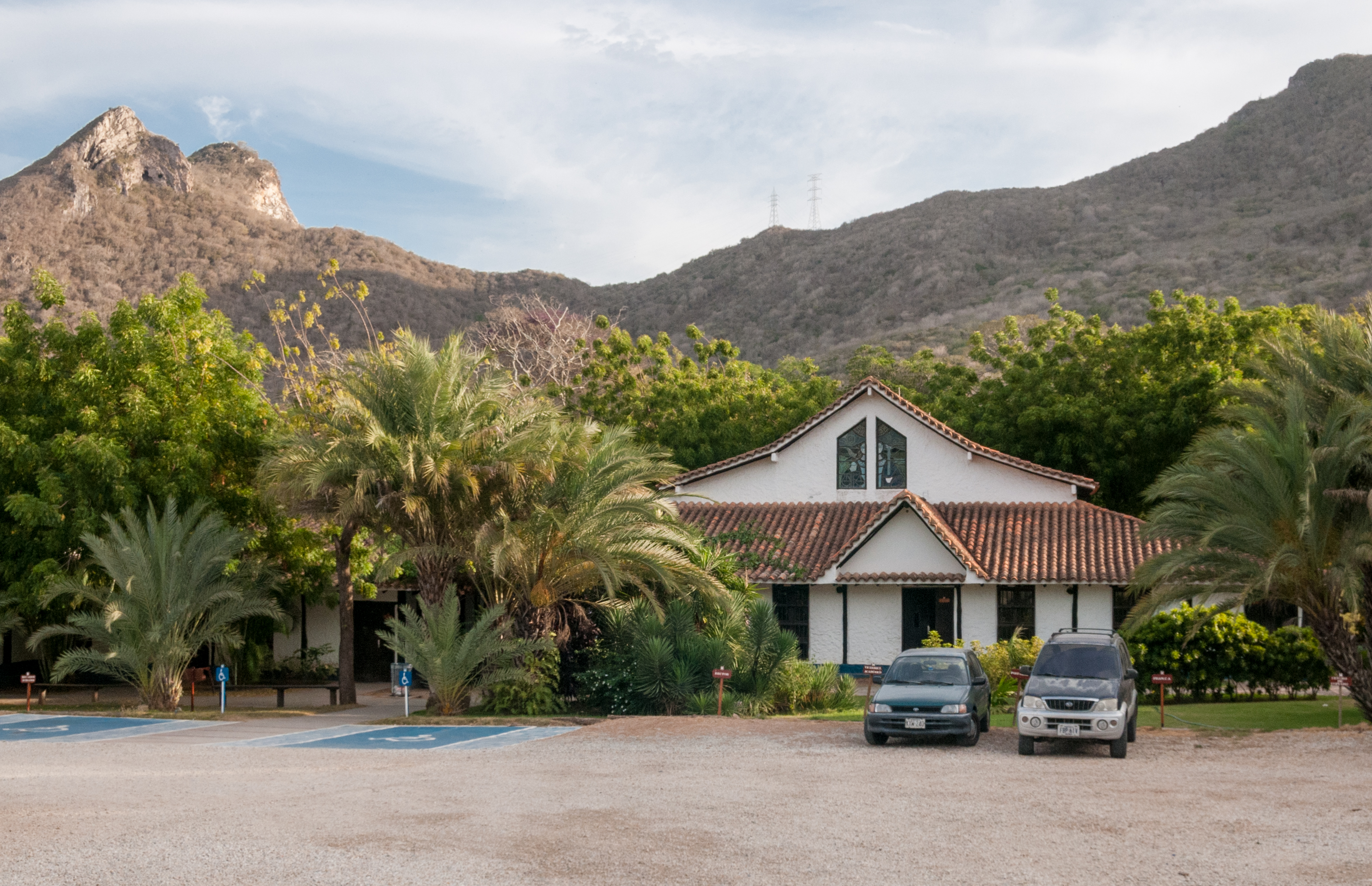
Universidad de Margarita

In different areas of the state are universities that offer careers mostly related to activities related to tourism, fishing and scientific research of the sea. However, over the decades, these institutions have been adapting to the growing demands and the labor demand not only of the activities mentioned above, to the point, that currently the variety of careers they offer are from the branches of the Social Sciences to the Human Sciences.

Below is a list of the main universities and institutes of higher education almost all in Margarita, due to the small population in Cubagua and Coche, are the following:

- Universidad de Oriente Nucleo Nueva Esparta
- National Experimental University of the Arts
- Margarita University
- Santiago Mariño Polytechnic University Institute
- University Institute of Industrial Technology "Rodolfo Loero Arismendi"
- University Institute of Technologies of the Sea
- National Polytechnic Experimental University of the Bolivarian Armed Forces (UNEFA)
- Restaurant-School "Playa Juventud" (Nucleus of the National Polytechnic Experimental University of the National Armed Forces)
- Bolivarian University of Venezuela
- National Open University – Nueva Esparta Local Center
- University Institute of Technology of the Sea (IUTEMAR)
- Libertador Experimental Pedagogical University (UPEL)
- Insular University Institute

== Transport ==
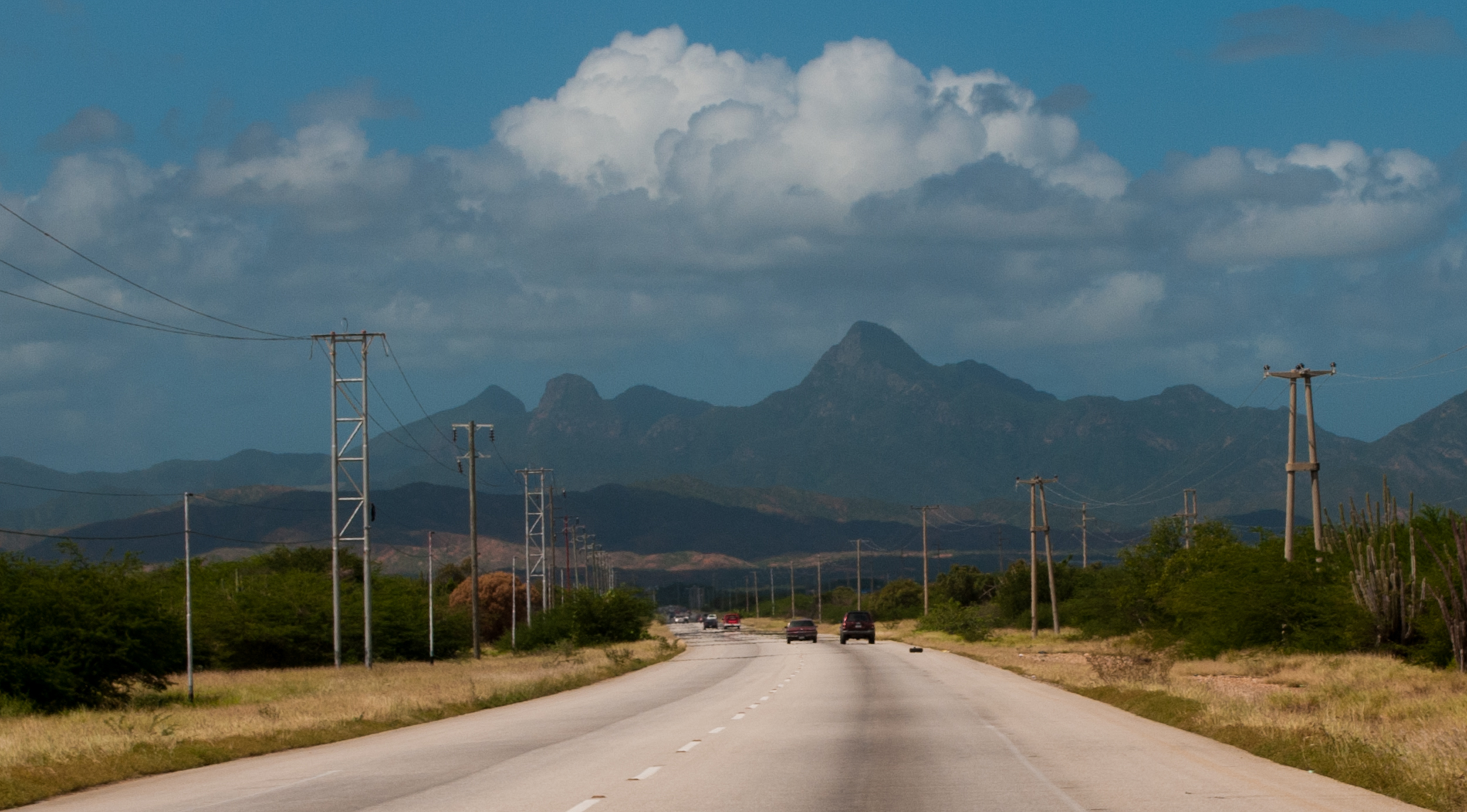
Road to the Macanao Peninsula

With 592.6 km of roads, the main routes are the CL5, which crosses Margarita from east to west, the premises # 4 and # 1 which cross the eastern part of the island in a north–south direction; and branch # 11, which runs from Punta de Piedras to CL5. Coche Island has a land route, which partially borders it.

The State has the Santiago Mariño Caribbean International Airport, located near Playa El Yaque, and small tracks by Car and Macanao.

The port infrastructure is headed by the El Guamache International Port and the Chacachacare and Punta Algodones piers; The Punta de Piedras ferry terminal serves tourist routes to Puerto La Cruz, Cumaná, La Guaira and San Pedro de Coche, while other maritime operators dispatch from Pampatar and Juan Griego. There are also piers in La Isleta and El Yaque, which provide transportation service to the neighboring island of Coche, as well as a service of smaller vessels (tapaítos) that depart from Porlamar to the town of Chacopata in Sucre State.

== Prominent figures ==
- Santiago Mariño: General in Chief of the Army of Venezuela, one of the heroes of the Independence of Latin America.
- Captain Antonio Díaz: he was born in San Juan Bautista on July 13, 1784, died in Barrancas del Orinoco, in 1826. He was Commander of the Subtle Forces of Venezuela, covered himself with glory on July 8, 1817, in the Battle from the island of Pagayos, in the Orinoco.
- Ensign of frigate Domingo Díaz: He was born in San Juan Bautista at the end of the 18th century and died in Guaira, on June 24, 1830. In 1823, under the orders of Admiral Padilla, he fought in the Naval Battle of Lake Maracaibo.
- Lieutenant Colonel Gaspar Marcano: born in San Juan Bautista on January 5, 1781, died in Maracaibo in July 1821. He studied at the University of Caracas, where he obtained a bachelor's degree in both Rights and later a bachelor's degree. He is a signatory to the Chacachacare compliance in 1813, attended the Cariaco Congress in 1817. He served as Secretary of Generals Arismendi y Gómez, advisor to Mariño and the Admiralty Court of Margarita. He was Deputy to the Congress of Angostura in 1818, in 1815 Deputy, alternate to the Congress of Cúcuta. In Güiria he prevented José Francisco Bermúdez from killing Simón Bolívar. 9 He wrote four letters in Octavas reales, which are known today as Margarita Epic.
- Jóvito Villalba: Venezuelan politician and lawyer who fought against the dictatorships of General Juan Vicente Gómez and that of General Marcos Pérez Jiménez.
- Manuel Plácido Maneiro: Deputy to the first Constituent Congress of Venezuela of 1811 and one of the signatories of the act of independence on behalf of the province of Margarita.
- Admiral José María García: Venezuelan military who fought in the Venezuelan War of Independence against Spain.

== Sport ==
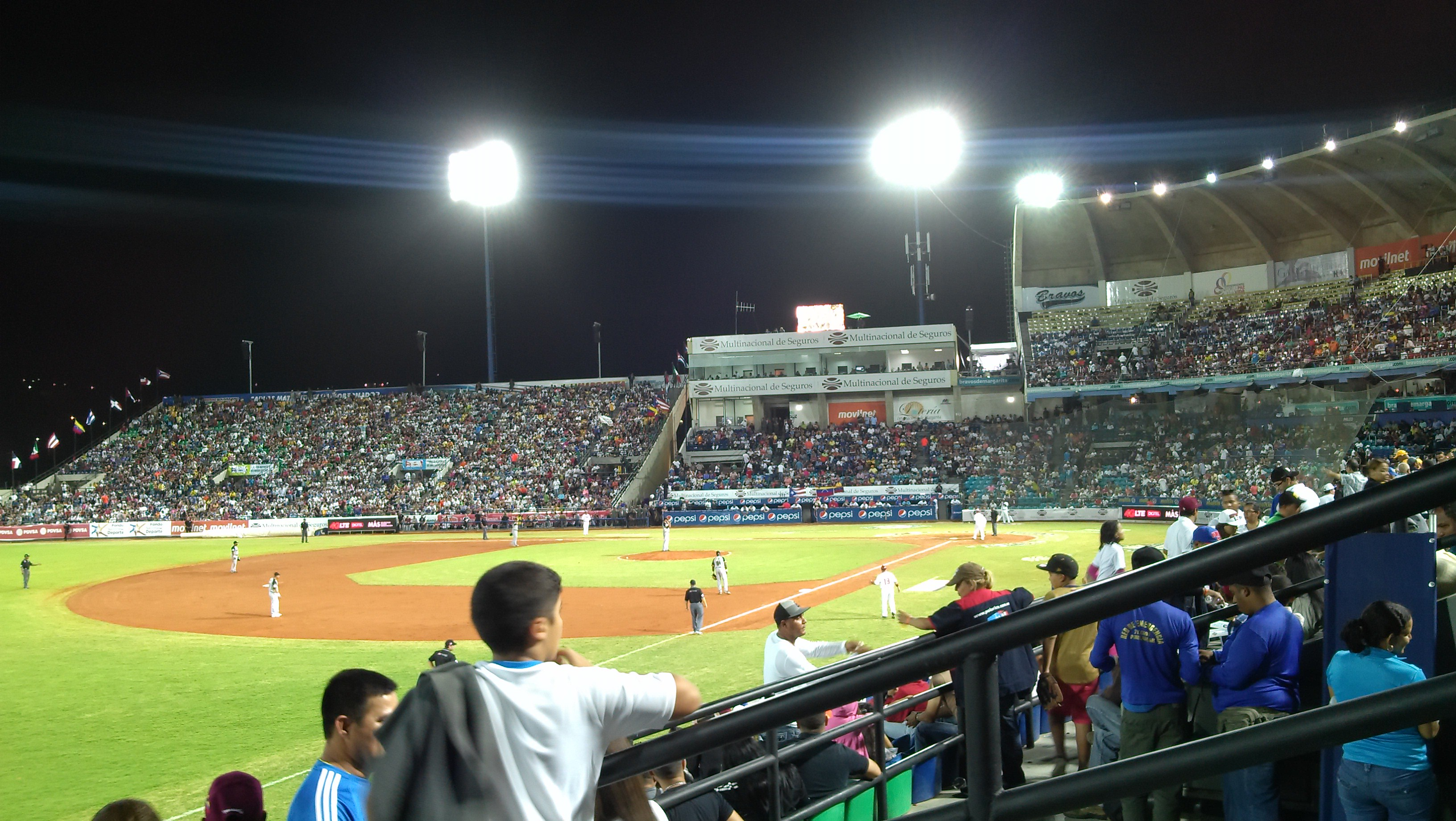
Estadio Nueva Esparta in Guatamare

=== Sport teams ===
- Bravos de Margarita, professional baseball team
- Margarita F.C., football team based in Pampatar
- UDC Margarita CF Soccer Third Division of Venezuela
- Deportivo Nueva Esparta Soccer Third Division of Venezuela
- Guaiqueríes de Margarita, professional basketball team

=== Sports facilities ===
- Estadio Nueva Esparta
- Gimnasio Ciudad de la Asunción
- Pampatar Sports City
- National High Performance Center (CNAR), Pampatar
- Velásquez Primitive Stadium, located in El Espinal
- Argenis Gómez Stadium, located in Carapacho
- Felmy Valdivieso Stadium in La Guardia
- Los Bagres Stadium
- Las Guevaras Stadium
- Boquerón Stadium
- Caicara Stadium

== See also ==
- States of Venezuela
