= Laguna de Las Marites Natural Monument =

Protected natural environment in Venezuela

Laguna de Las Marites Natural Monument Monumento Natural Laguna de Las Marites
- IUCN category III (natural monument or feature)
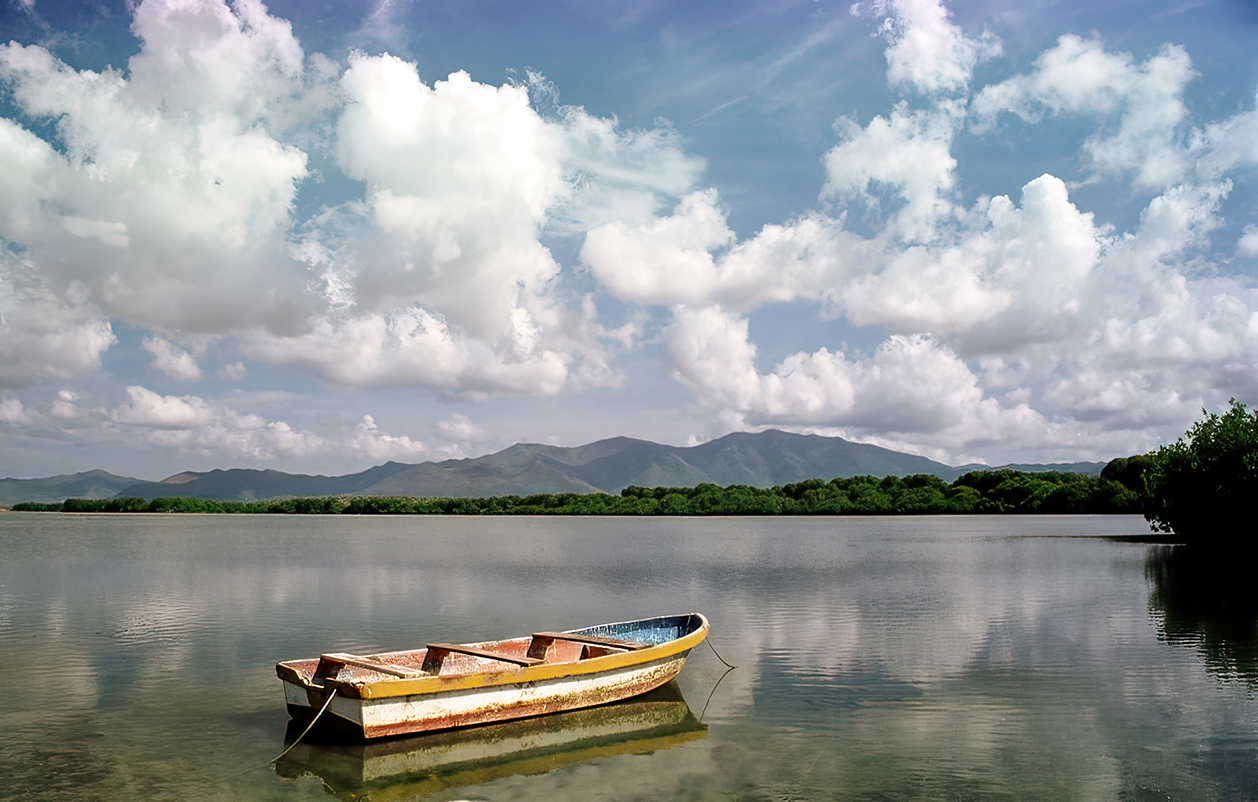

- Location within Venezuela
- Location: Venezuela
- Coordinates: 10°55′N 63°55′W
- Area: 36.74 km^{2} (14.19 sq mi)
- Established: February 27, 1974

The Laguna de las Marites Natural Monument (Spanish: Monumento Natural Laguna de las Marites), or Las Marites Lagoon Natural Monument, is a protected hypersaline lagoon with Natural Monument status located on the south-east coastal plain of Margarita Island, in Nueva Esparta state in the north-west of Venezuela. It was declared a Natural Monument on 27 February 1974.

== Environment ==
The reserve has an area of 3,674 ha, a maximum elevation of 40 m and an average temperature of 26°C.

=== Flora and fauna ===
The lagoon vegetation is dominated by black and red mangroves. On the coast the vegetation is xerophilous. Aquatic species include lebranche mullet and horse mackerel as well as crabs and smooth and white shrimp. Birds include brown pelicans and various herons. The reserve has been designated an Important Bird Area (IBA) by BirdLife International because it supports significant populations of scarlet ibises and reddish egrets.

== See also ==
- List of national parks of Venezuela
- Cerro Santa Ana Natural Monument

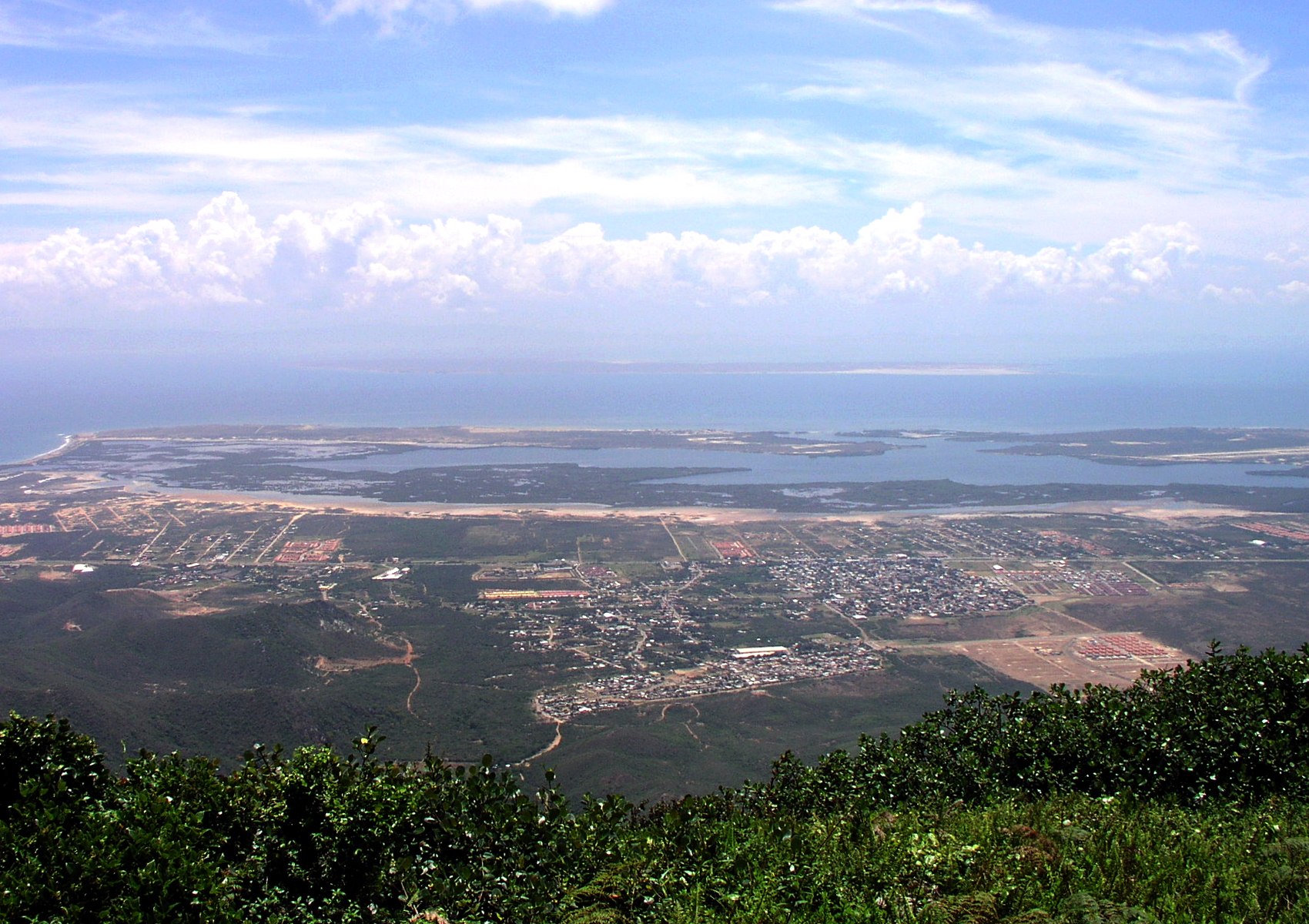
Another View
