= Tetas de María Guevara =

Tetas de Maria Guevara
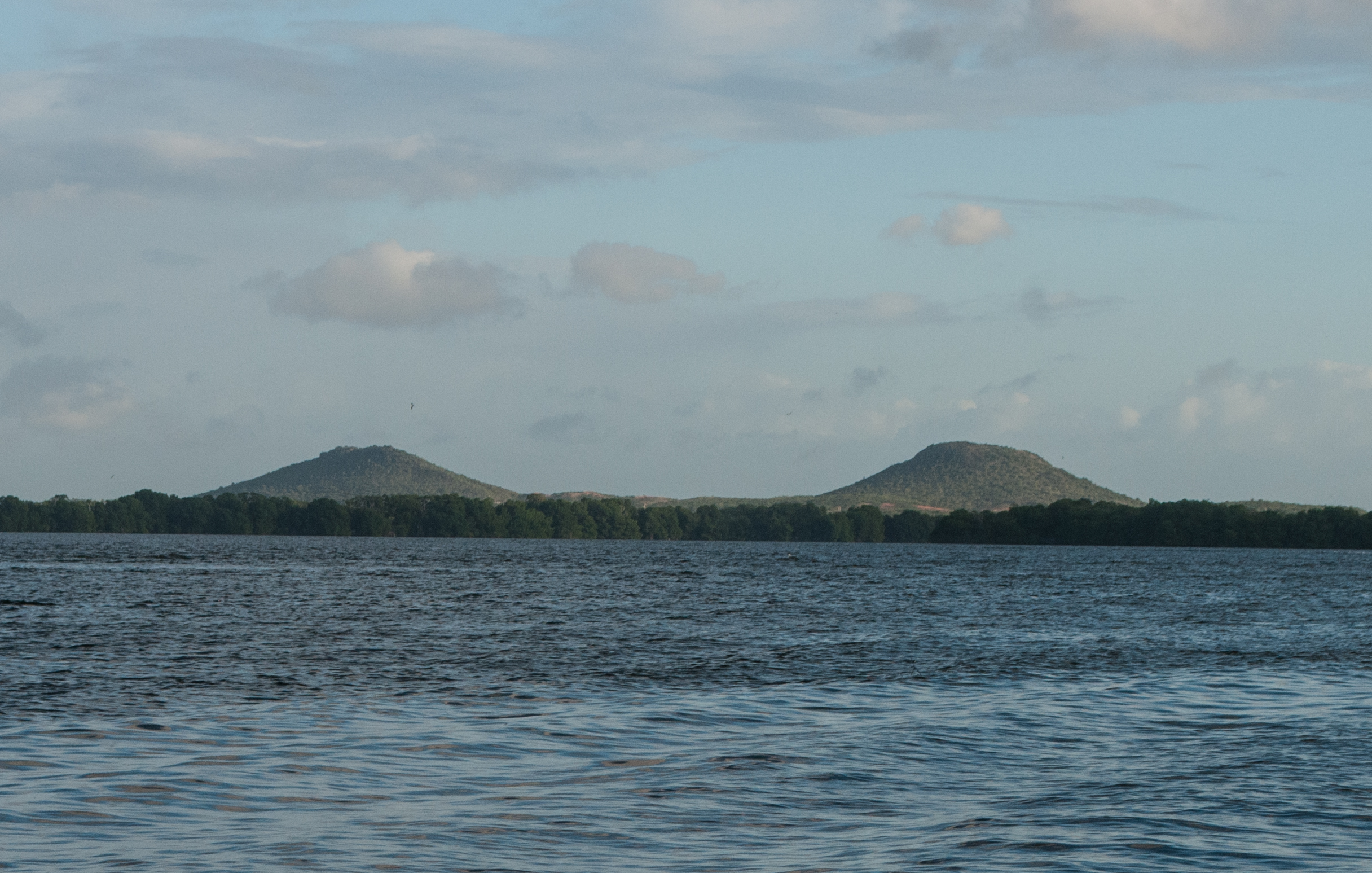
- Tetas de Maria Guevara seen from Laguna de la Restinga

Highest point
- Elevation: 75 m (246 ft)
- Listing: Breast-shaped hills
- Coordinates: 10°57′28″N 64°07′01″W

Geography
- Location within Venezuela
- Location: Venezuela

Climbing
- First ascent: Unknown
- Easiest route: From Santa María, Isla Margarita

Tetas de María Guevara (Spanish: María Guevara's Tits) are twin hills located near Laguna de la Restinga in central Isla Margarita, Venezuela.

== Background ==
These hills are used as a landmark by local fishermen. They were declared a Natural Monument in 1974. The western hill, the higher, is only 75 metres (246 ft) high, but they stand out in the surrounding flat arid plain and are easily seen from the ferry. One of the local legends say that these breast-shaped hills were named after a mestiza woman from Cumaná who fought in the Venezuelan War of Independence and whose tomb lies beneath the hills.

== See also ==
- Isla Margarita
- Breast-shaped hill
