= Playa Parguito =

Beach

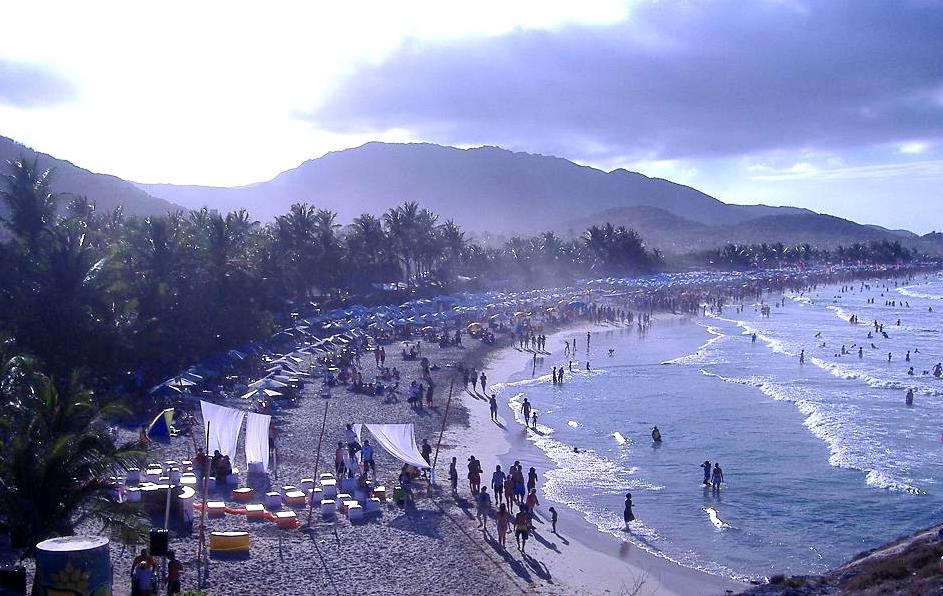
Playa Parguito is the surfer's hot spot on Isla Margarita

Playa Parguito (Parguito Beach) it is situated in the Northeast end of Isla Margarita. The beach is approximately 1000 m long and about 20 m wide. The waters tend to be more oceanic at Playa Parguito which has made it a perfect place for surfing.

Playa Parguito does not offer as many restaurants and other conveniences than Playa El Agua but it is still well liked by people that seek more privacy among the Isla Margarita beaches.
