= Los Fermines =

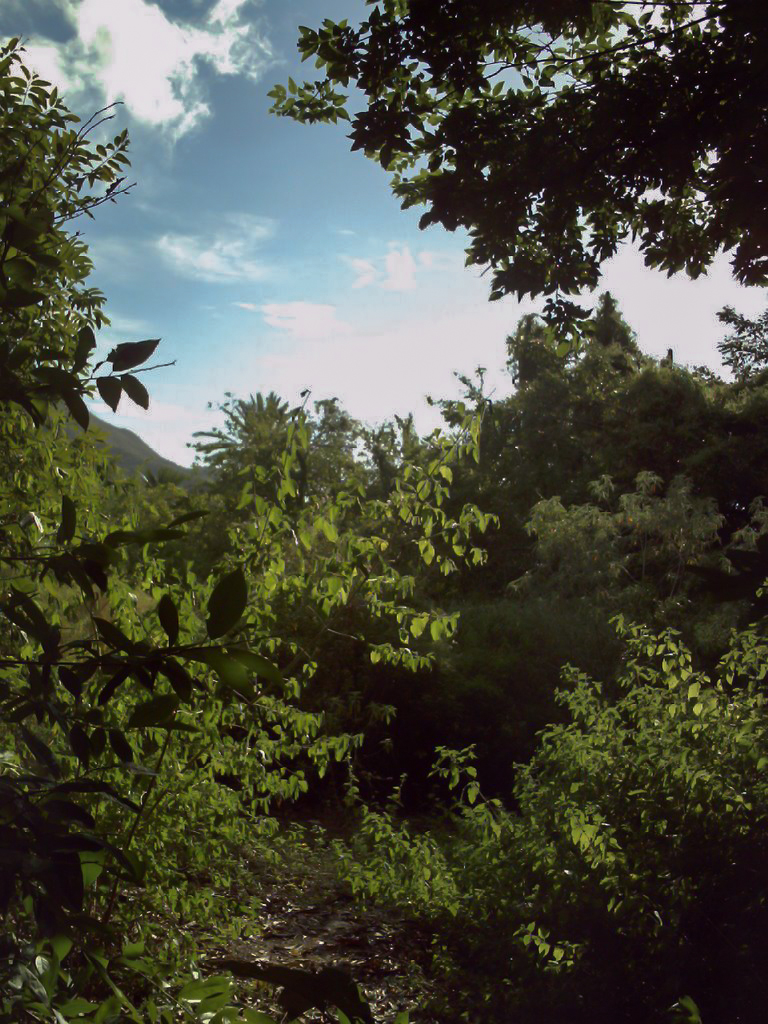

- Location within Venezuela
- Coordinates: 11°1′11″N 63°56′43″W
- Country: Venezuela
- State: Nueva Esparta
- Municipality: Antonio Díaz
- Postal coded: 6301
- Area code: 295
- Climate: BSh

Los Fermines is a hamlet that is part of Municipality of Antonio Díaz, Nueva Esparta, Venezuela. Located on the slopes of Cerro Valle Hondo. The hamlet is divided by the following sectors: Sucre street, Libertad street (Boulevard Etanislao Lao Marcano 1992), José Augusto Millán street, Las Huertas, Puerto e 'Tabla, El Rincón del Perro, Concha e' Coco, El Dique y Calle la Feria. Los Fermines has several aquifer resources, including the San Juan River that supplies water to the Dique de San Juan.

== Etymology ==
There are two hypotheses about the origin of the place name. The first is due to Spanish Manuel de Clemente y Fermín, one of the first inhabitants and owner of the lands of Valle Hondo. The second, Don Fermín took possession of the lands of Valle Hondo (El Dique and its surroundings) and that he had many children and these in turn were watering the surname for the sector.
