= Playa Caribe =

Beach in Isla Margarita, Venezuela

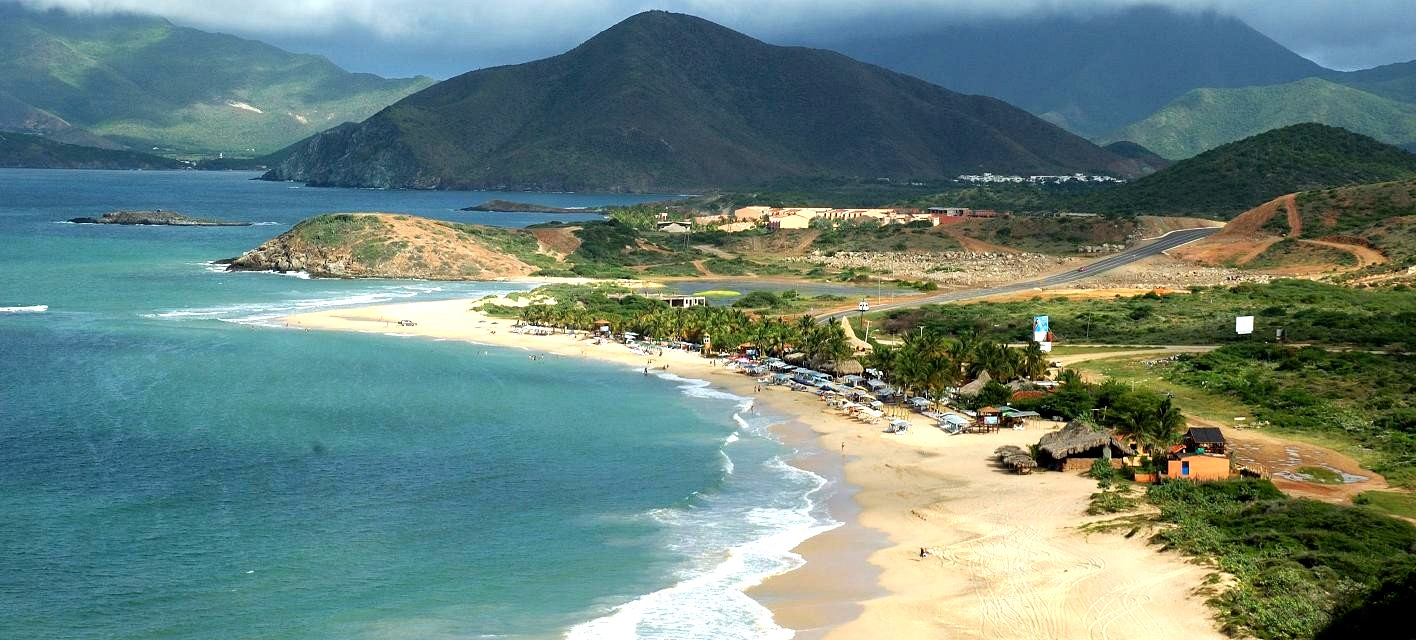
Playa Caribe, its landscape and clear waters captivate locals and visitors

Playa Caribe is a beach situated a few minutes north of Juan Griego, at a small bay on the west coast of Isla Margarita. It is a fairly popular beach nearly a mile long (1200 m) with several restaurants and foodstands. Playa Caribe is an exposed beach break with moderate waves.
