= San Juan Bautista, Nueva Esparta =

- Location within Venezuela
- Coordinates: 11.0142°N 63.9451°W

San Juan Bautista is a town on Isla Margarita, in the state of Nueva Esparta, Venezuela. It is the capital of the Antonio Díaz Municipality.
