= Playa Puerto Cruz =

Beach in Venezuela

Coordinates: 11.124865°N 63.927727°W

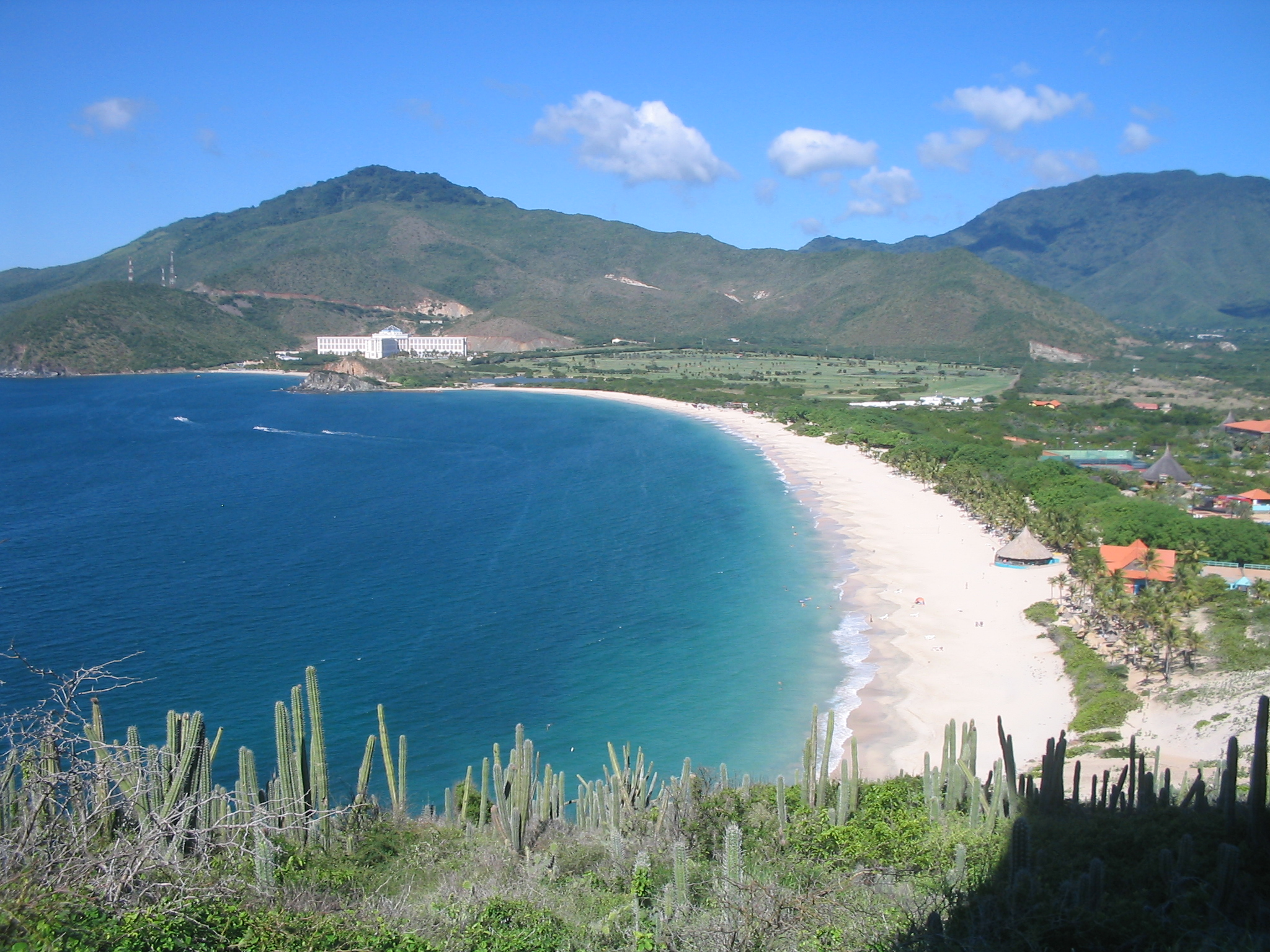
picture from Lighthouse of the beach

Playa Puerto Cruz is a roughly 1 km long beach located near Pedro Gonzalez in Isla Margarita, Venezuela. Located on Playa Puerto Cruz is the lighthouse of Punta Zaragoza, mounted on top of one of the two hills enclosing the island. Until the winter of 2004 (November), a small wooden tower stood on the beach near the many shops and the beach bar.

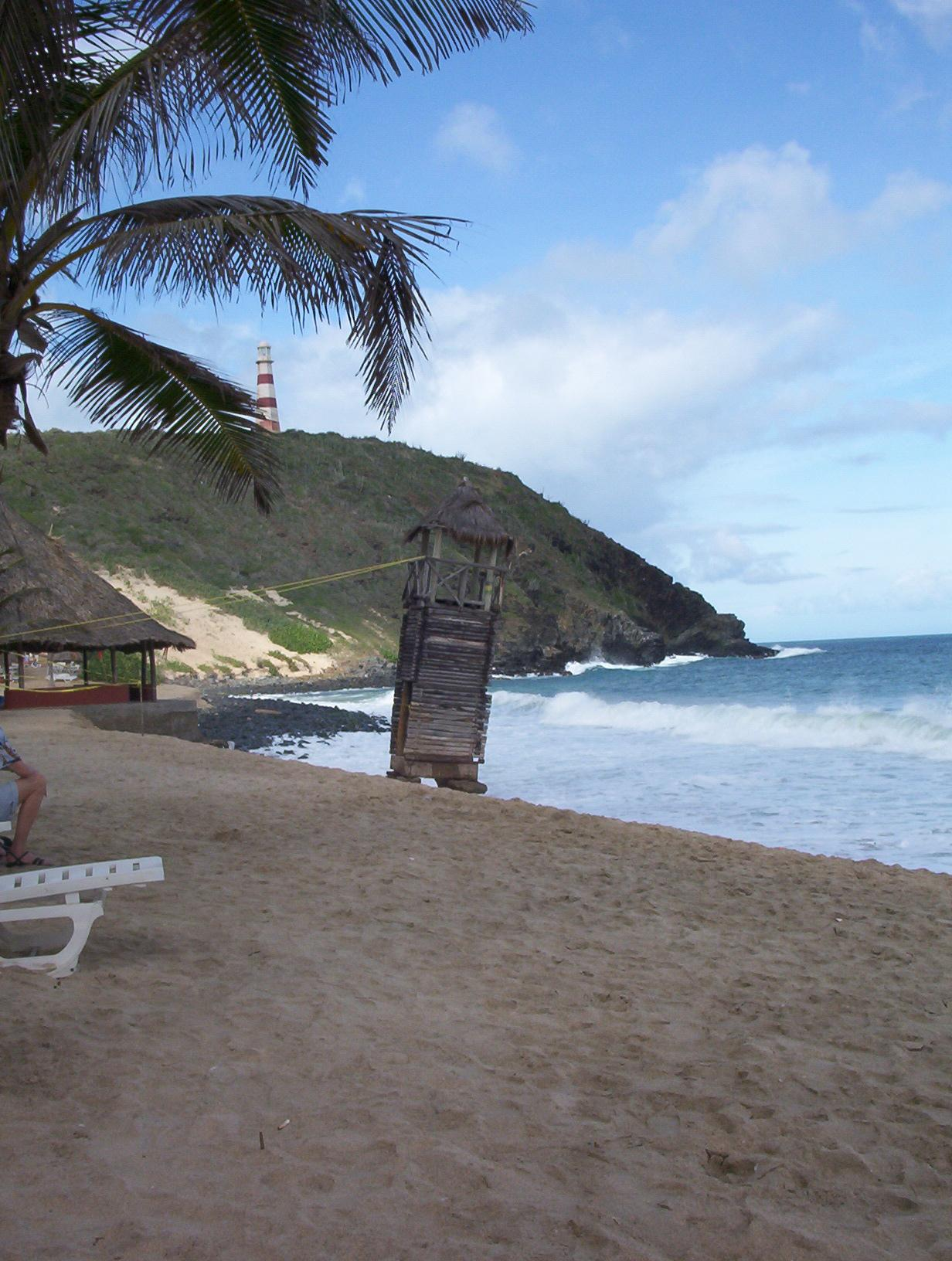
picture of the old wooden tower washed away by the seas in the winter of 2004

Puerto Cruz has been the location of the making of numerous commercial films because of its long white sandy beach.
