= Margarita Island =

Island in Venezuela

Margarita
Native name: Isla de Margarita Nickname: Pearl of the Caribbean
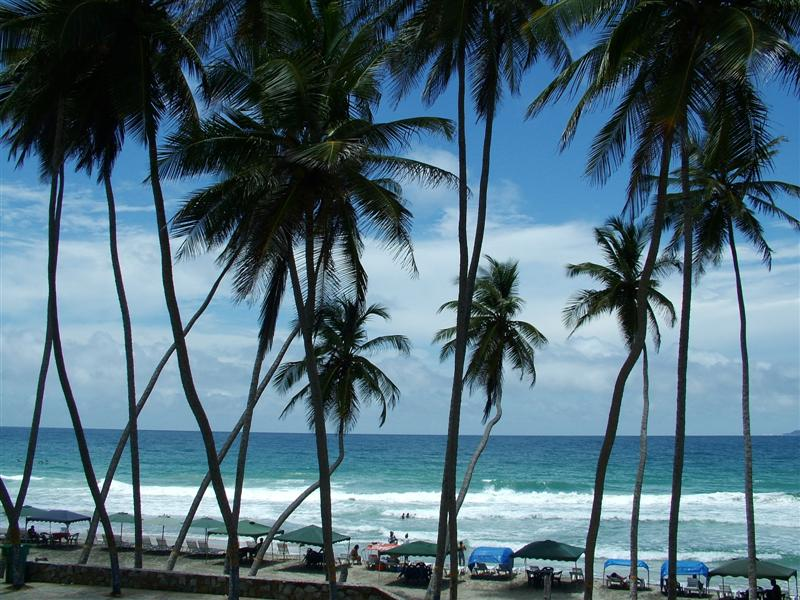
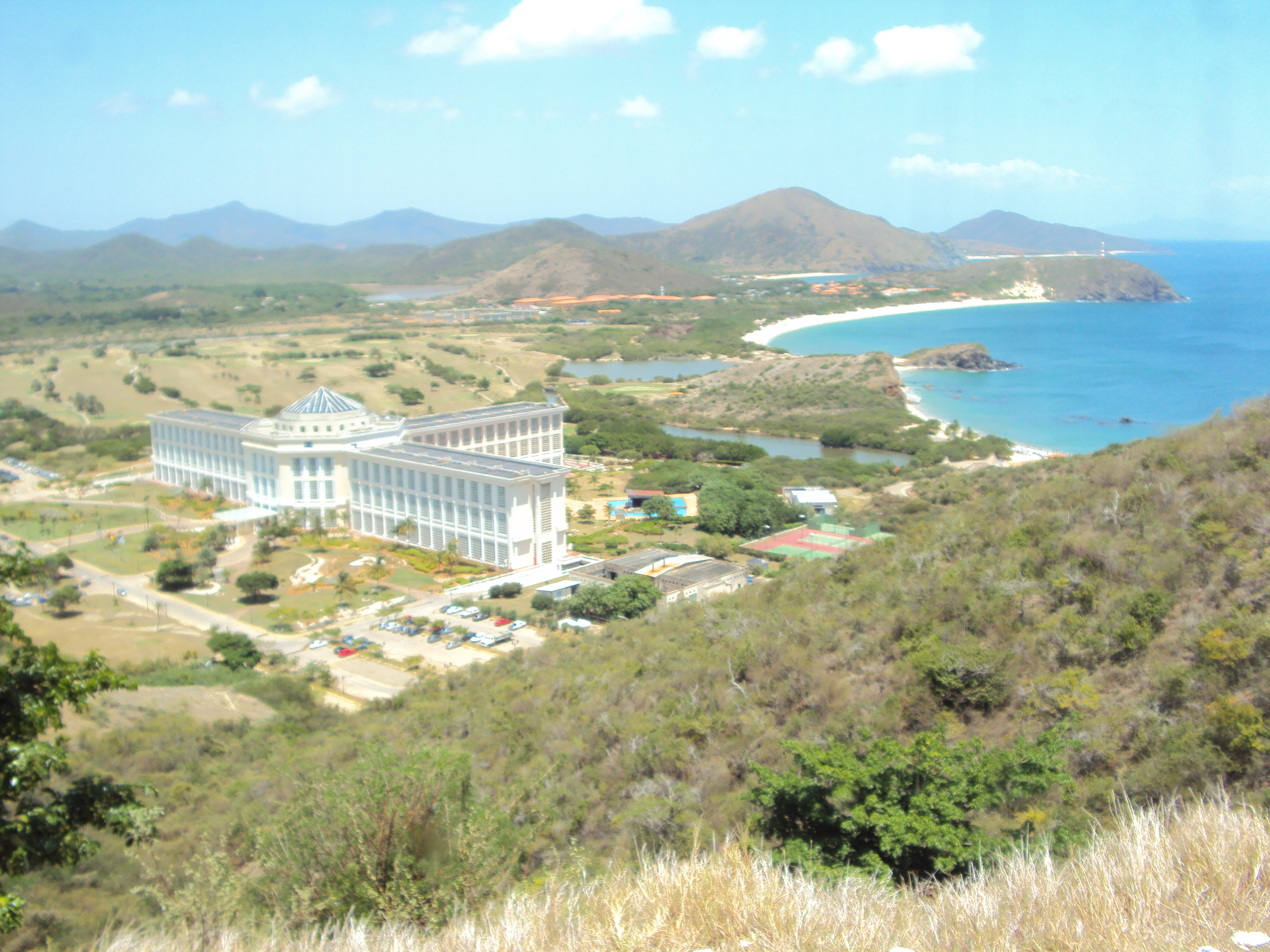
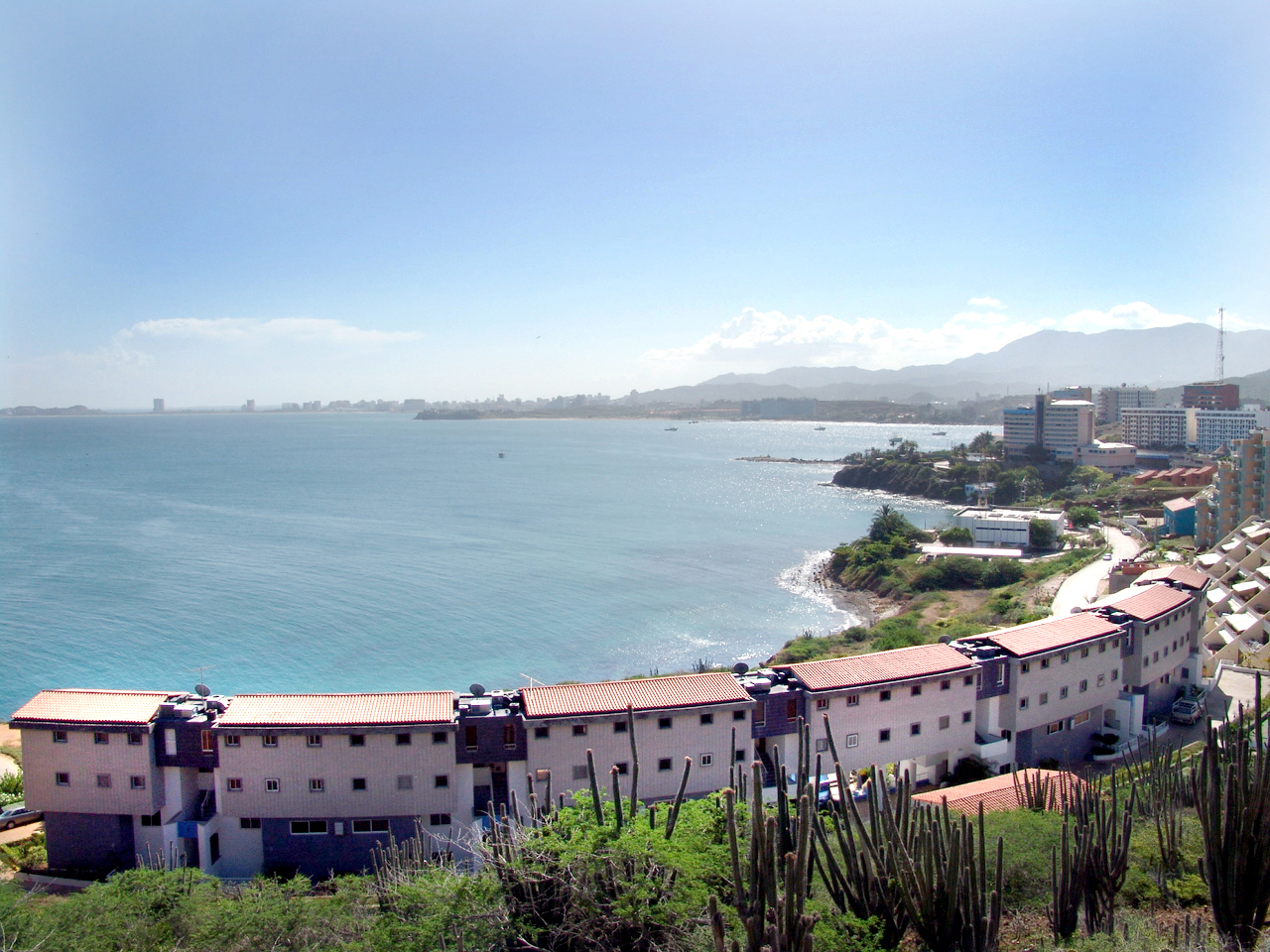
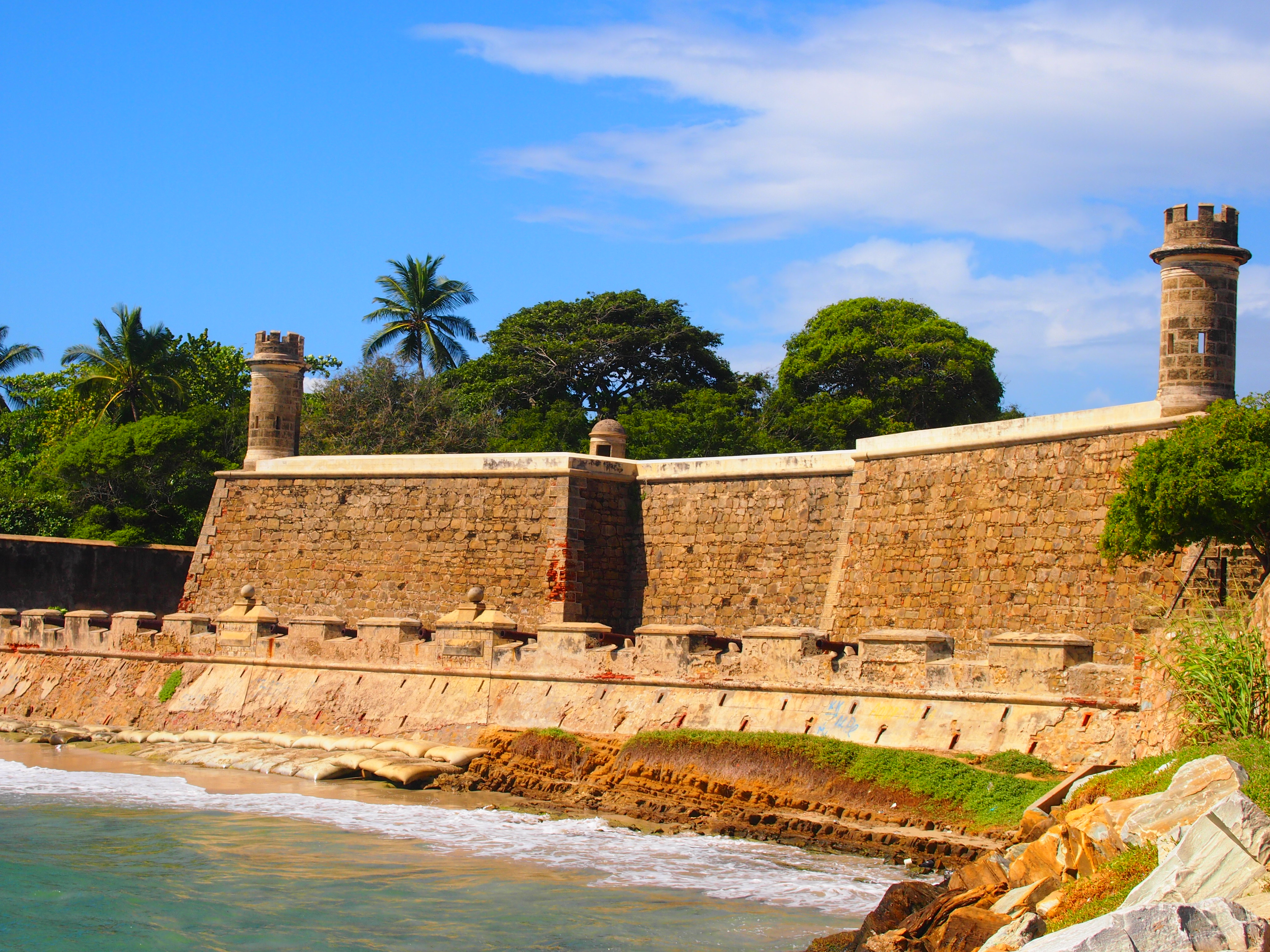
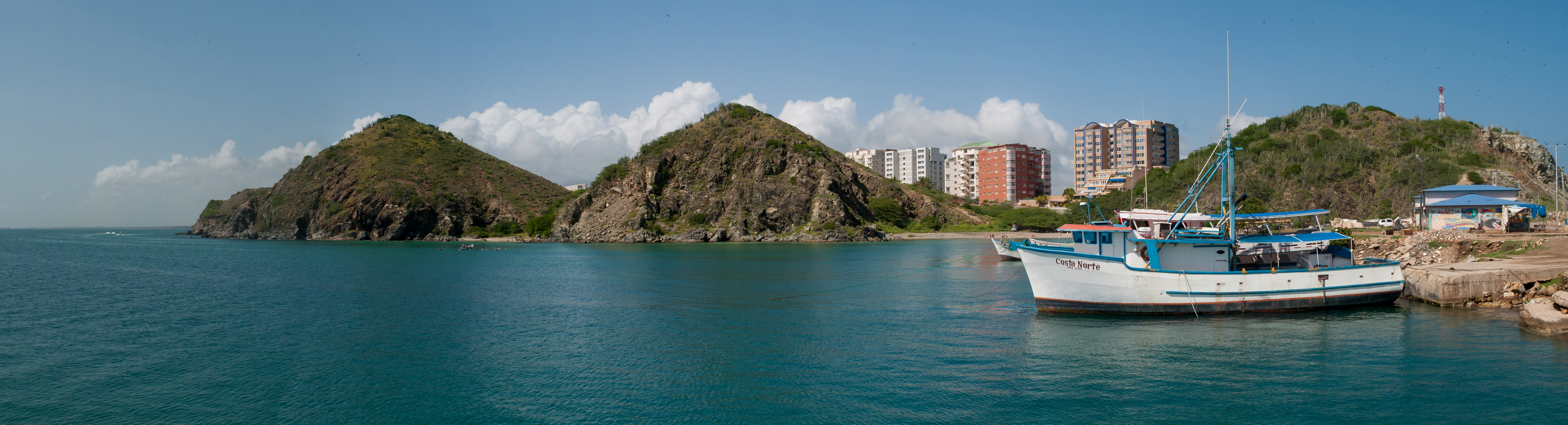
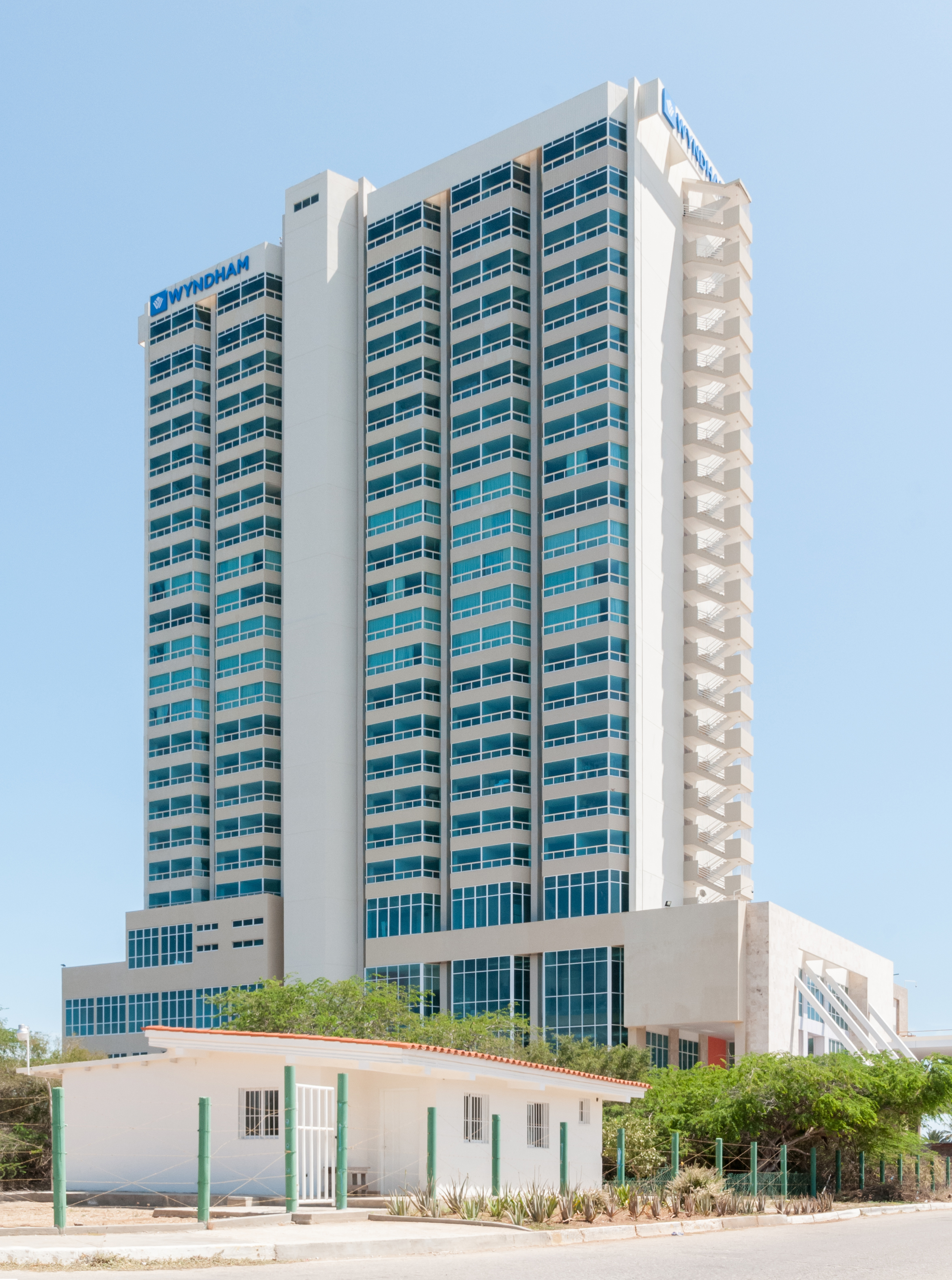
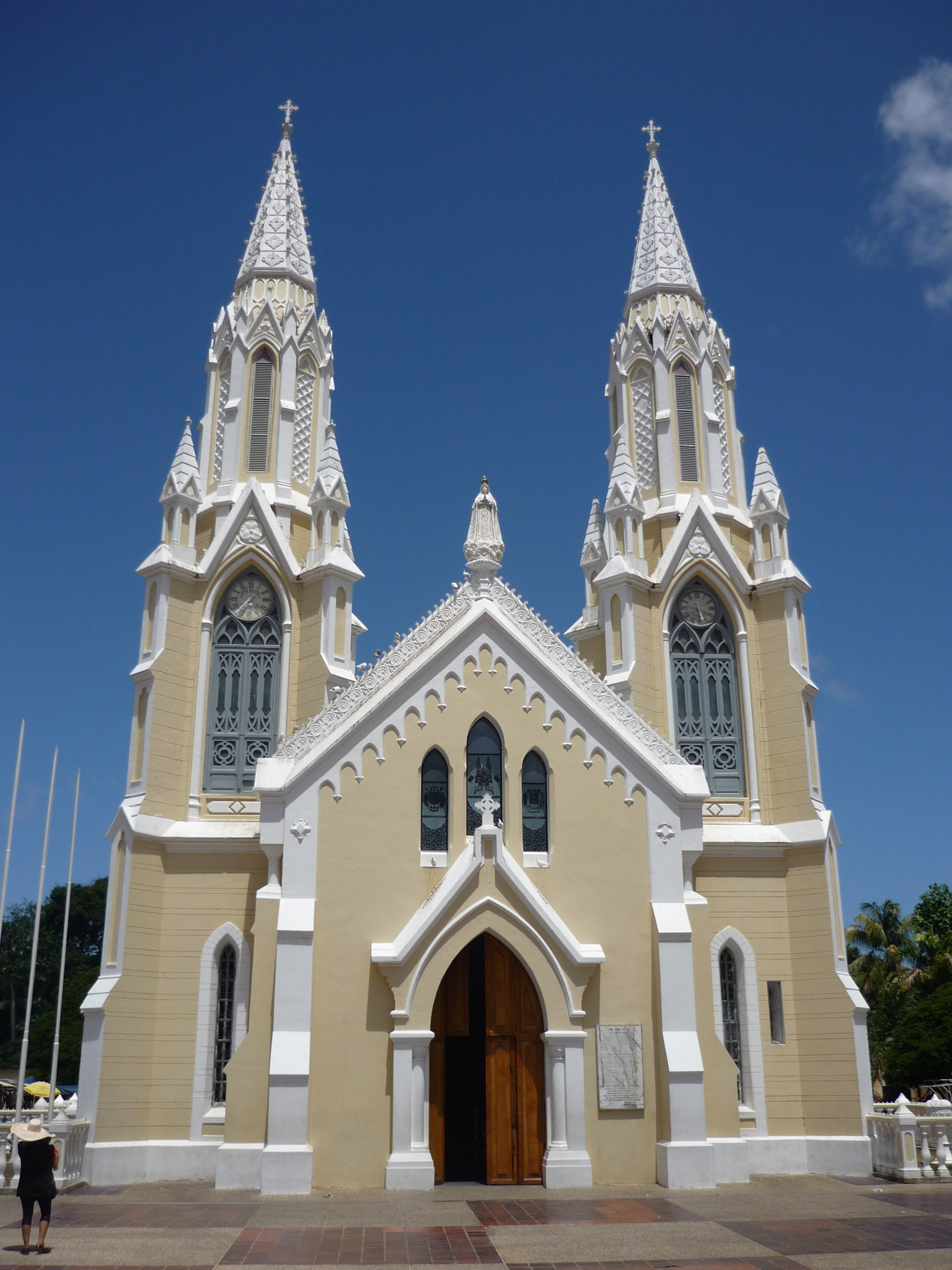

- Location within Venezuela

Geography
- Location: Caribbean Sea
- Coordinates: 10°59′13″N 63°56′08″W
- Area: 1,020 km^{2} (390 sq mi)
- Length: 78 km (48.5 mi)
- Width: 20 km (12 mi)
- Highest elevation: 920 m (3020 ft)
- Highest point: Cerro Grande (Cerro San Juan)

Administration
- Venezuela
- State: Nueva Esparta
- Largest settlement: Porlamar (pop. 85,000)

Demographics
- Population: 489,917 (2014)
- Pop. density: 411.76/km^{2} (1066.45/sq mi)

Margarita Island (Isla de Margarita, Spanish pronunciation: [maɾɣaˈɾita]) is the largest island in the Venezuelan state of Nueva Esparta, situated off the north west coast of the country, in the Caribbean Sea. The capital city of Nueva Esparta, La Asunción, is located on the island.

== History ==
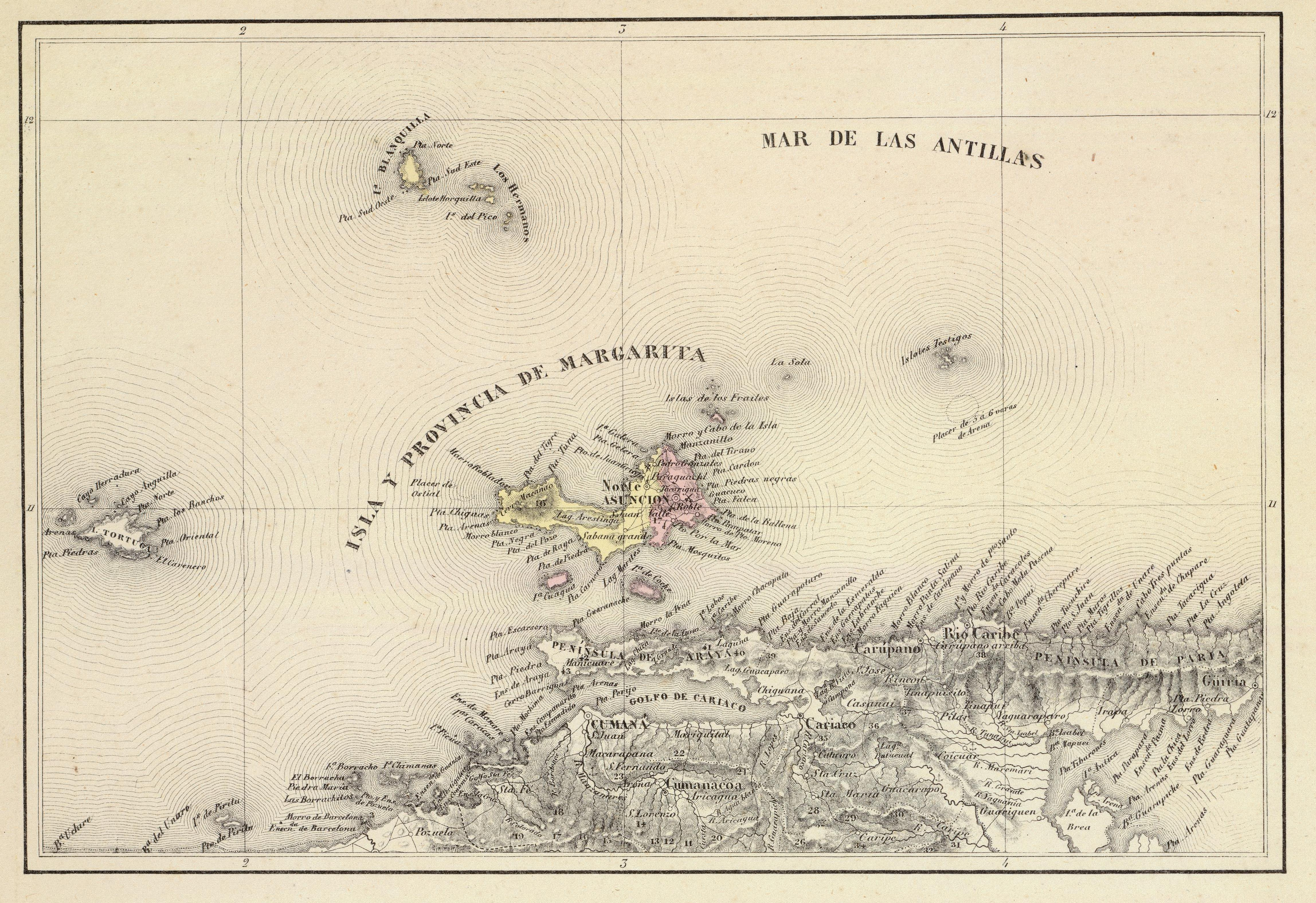
1840 map by Agustín Codazzi

=== Age of Exploration ===
Christopher Columbus was the first European to arrive on Margarita Island in 1498. The local Natives were the Waikeri people. The coast of the island was abundant in pearls, which represented almost a third of all Western Hemisphere tribute to the Spanish Crown. Margarita Island was fortified against the increasing threat of pirate attacks, and some fortifications remain today. It was the center of Spanish colonial Margarita Province, established in 1525.

In 1561, the island was seized by Lope de Aguirre, a notoriously violent and rebellious conquistador who killed the governor Juan Villadrando. Around 1675, the island was captured again, this time by Red Legs Greaves, a pirate known for his humanity and morality. He captured a fleet of Spanish ships off port, before turning the guns on the forts which he stormed and claimed a large booty of pearls and gold. The story of Greaves' capture of the island does not appear in historical Spanish records and may be fictional.

Construction of the Santa Rosa de la Eminencia castle was ordered by the governor, Juan Muñoz de Gadea, after the French buccaneer Marquis de Maintenon attacked the island in early 1676.

=== Independence era ===
The island gained independence from the Spanish in 1814, after the collapse of the First Republic of Venezuela. It became the first permanently free territory in Venezuela. In the same year, Luisa Cáceres de Arismendi was detained in a dungeon of the Fortress of Santa Rosa on the island in an attempt to put pressure on her husband Juan Bautista Arismendi, who was fighting for independence. Her detention lasted for over three years. In 1815 the general Pablo Morillo with a fleet of 18 warships and 42 cargo ships disembarked in Island Margarita with the mission to pacify the revolts against the Spanish monarchy in the American colonies. Simón Bolívar was confirmed as Commander-in-Chief of the Second Republic of Venezuela on the island in 1816. From there, he started a nine-year campaign to free Venezuela, Colombia, Ecuador, Peru, and Bolivia from the Spanish Crown.

=== Contemporary history ===
In modern times, Margarita Island has been primarily a tourist destination. The island's status as a duty-free port was established in 1974 to promote commercial and tourism industries, with lower-priced imports driving increased visitors and the development of hotels. The island was the host venue for the Caribbean Series in 2010 and 2014.

== Geography ==
Nueva Esparta map

Located in the Caribbean Sea between latitudes 10°52'N and 11°11'N and longitudes 63°48'W and 64°23'W, the island, along with the islands of Coche and Cubagua, comprises the state of Nueva Esparta. Margarita Island is actually composed of two islands, Paraguachoa and Macanao, connected by the 18-kilometer-long isthmus of La Restinga, a sandy tombolo. Together, the conjoined landmass is 78 kilometres (48 mi) long, up to 20 kilometres (12 mi) wide, and covers an area of 1,020 square kilometres (390 sq mi). The climate is sunny and dry, with average temperatures ranging from 24 °C (75 °F) to 37 °C (99 °F).

Most of Margarita's 420,000 residents live on the eastern landmass, Paraguachoa, which includes the large cities of Porlamar and Pampatar, along with the state capital of La Asunción.

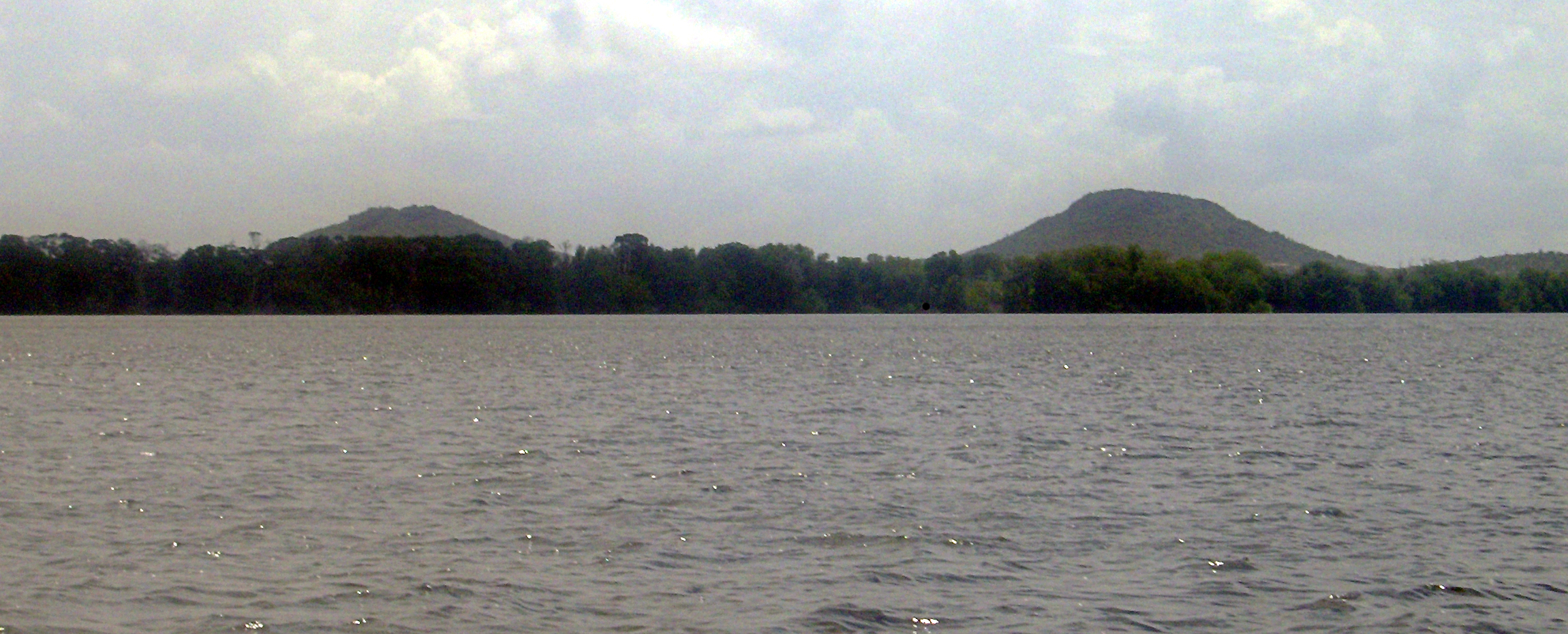
Tetas de Maria Guevara (twin mountains)

The western landmass of Macanao, formerly a separate island and now alternatively described as a peninsula, has a central mountain range in the east–west direction. The highest altitude is 760 metres (2,493 ft) at Pico de Macanao. Several smaller ranges derive from this axis following a north–south orientation with deep valleys between them. The most notable of these valleys is San Francisco in the north-central part of the peninsula.

The eastern landmass of Paraguachoa, is formed by a mountain range in the north–south direction from Porlamar to Cabo Negro. The highest peaks are San Juan or Cerro Grande at 920 metres (3,018 ft) and El Copey 890 metres (2,920 ft).

Macanao and Paraguachoa are connected by the La Restinga isthmus, a sandbar which caused the formation of the La Restinga lagoon. There are also two breast-shaped hills known as Tetas de Maria Guevara on the isthmus.

=== Beaches ===
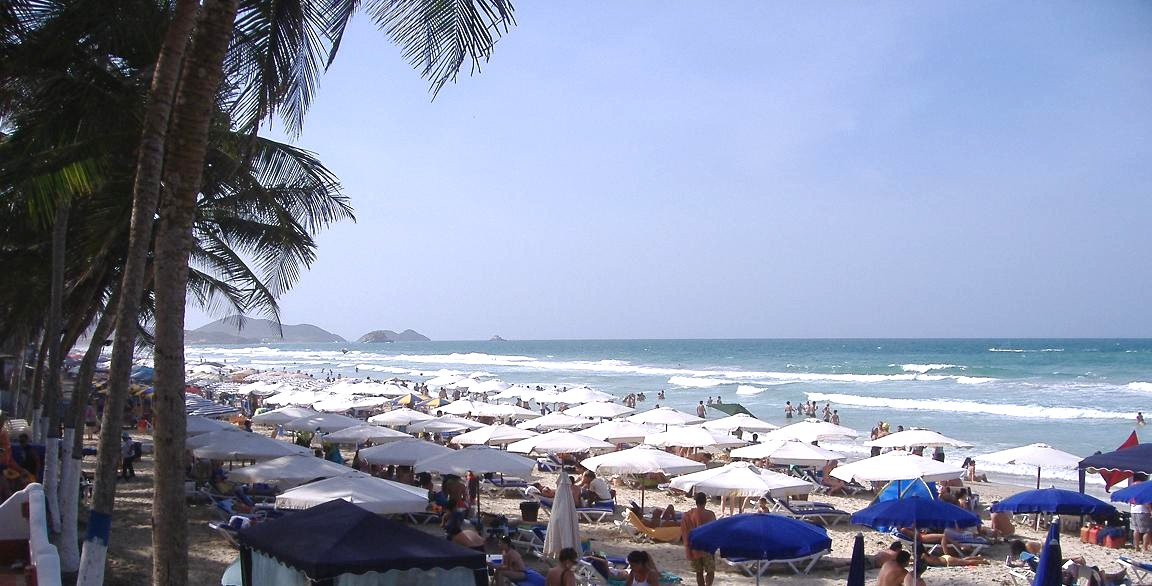
Playa El Agua

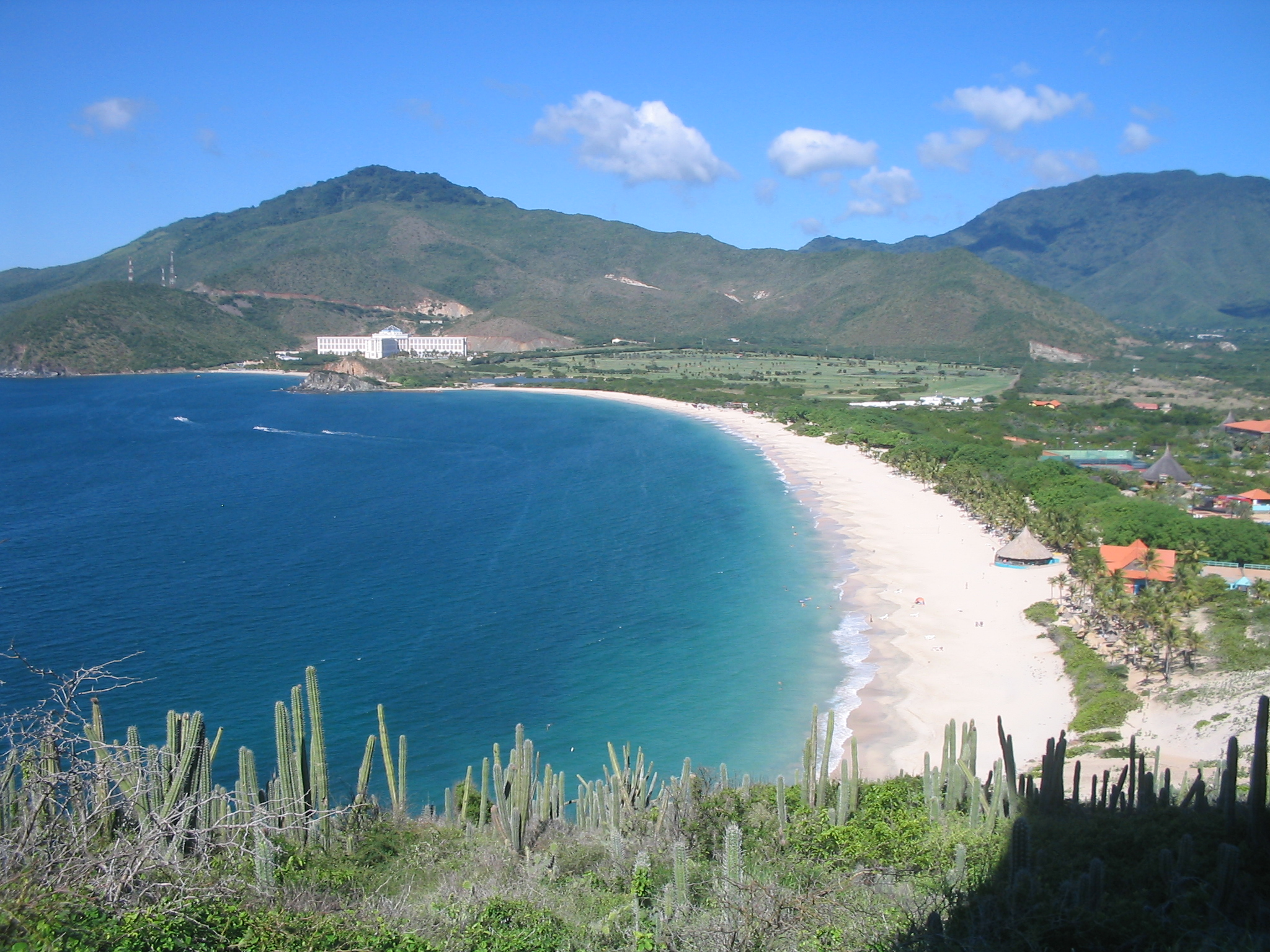
Margarita Hilton at Playa Puerto Cruz

There are at least 70 beaches on the island, which has a 106 miles (171 km) coastline. Popular beaches include Playa El Yaque, Playa Parguito, Playa Caribe, Playa Punta Arenas, Playa El Agua and Playa Puerto Cruz.

=== Terrain ===
Macanao consists of a mountainous spine of the central west–east, with several culminations, including Macanao Peak, which is the highest, with an altitude of 760 meters above sea level stands. This axial region several side brackets oriented north–south off, including deep valleys are dissected; the most important is San Francisco in the north central of Margarita. The central massif is surrounded by foothills forming a more or less continuous, narrow strip, which extends to the north and south coasts.

=== Mountains ===
The eastern landmass, Paraguachoa, has a mountain range which runs roughly north–south, from northern Porlamar to Cabo Negro; north from the town of El Espinal, the massif rises steeply to the culminations of San Juan and Copey hills, at heights of 920 m (3,020 ft) and 890 m (2,920 ft), respectively. The hills are Matasite and Guayamurí Los Andes foothills. To the north stands the Tragaplata hill.

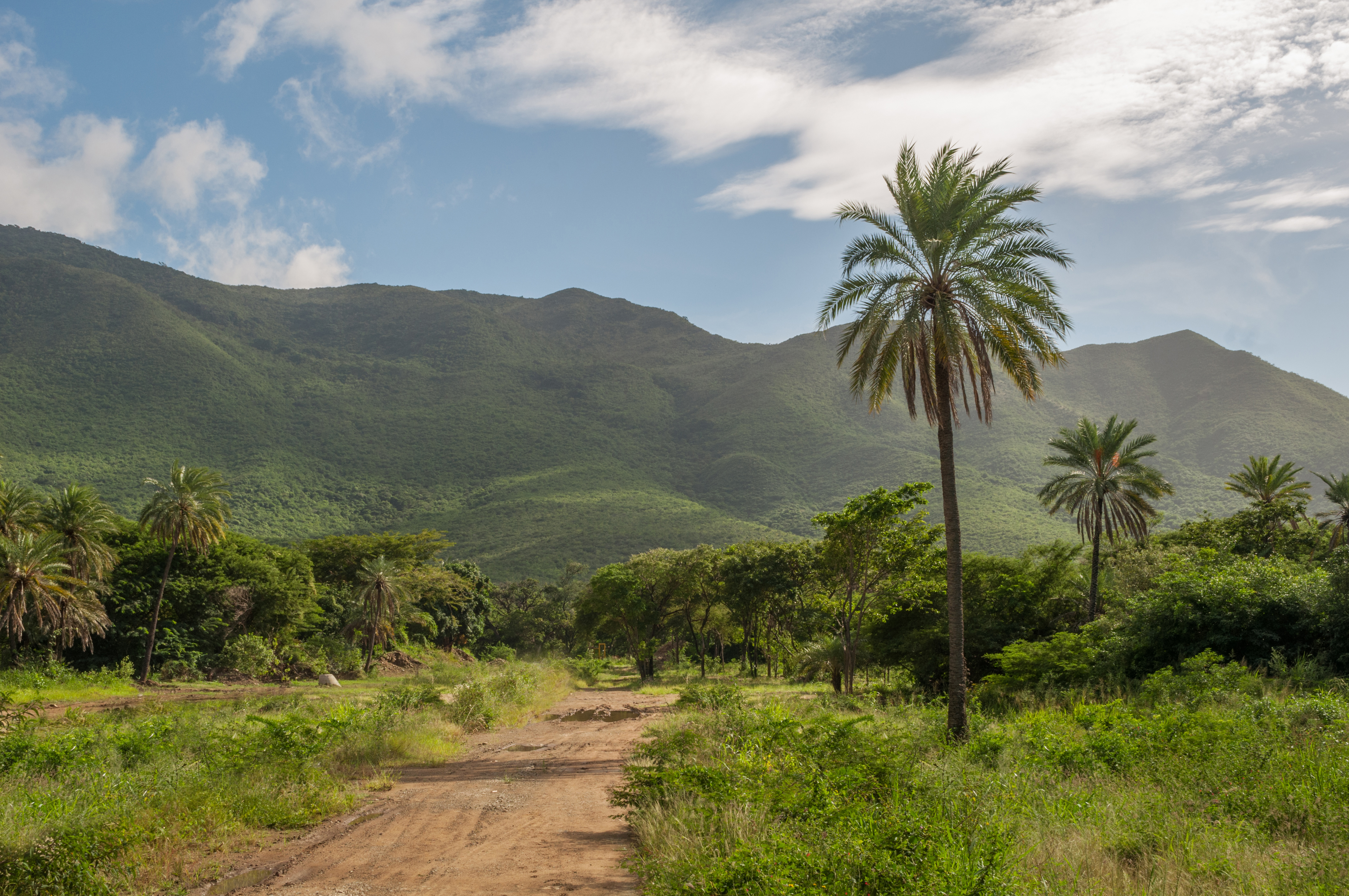
Copey Hill – view from San Juan downtown

Among the higher elevations found on the island, are cited:

Paraguachoa:

- San Juan Hill 920 meters above mean sea level
- Copey Hill 890m amsl
- Cocheima 810m amsl
- Tragaplata Hill 640m amsl
- El Cacho Hill 510m amsl

Macanao:

- Macanao Hill 750m amsl
- Los Cedros Hill 745m amsl
- Risco Blanco Hill 680m amsl
- Guaraguao Hill 660m amsl
- Soledad Hill 540m amsl
- Piedra Lisa Hill 500m amsl
- El Castillo Hill 380m amsl

The highest portion of the Serranía de Macanao forms a wide arc as a semicircle or amphitheater open to the northwest, surrounding a protected valley, extremely picturesque, where the town of S. Francisco is settled. From the highest hill, Los Cedars, which occupy a central position, and Towards the northwest, the Serranía loses altitude gradually into a continuum in which alternating downward and small slopes climbs to the Guarataro hill, which from the east it stands out as a small pyramidal stone projection but from the north is projected as an isolated hill whose profile of steep and long slopes offers one of the most striking perspectives of the silhouette of the entire Serranía. Following the Guarataro and going north, there is a wide valley with rounded hills, crossed or separated by ravines or ravines. Partial view of the Serranía. On the right the hill "Guarataro".

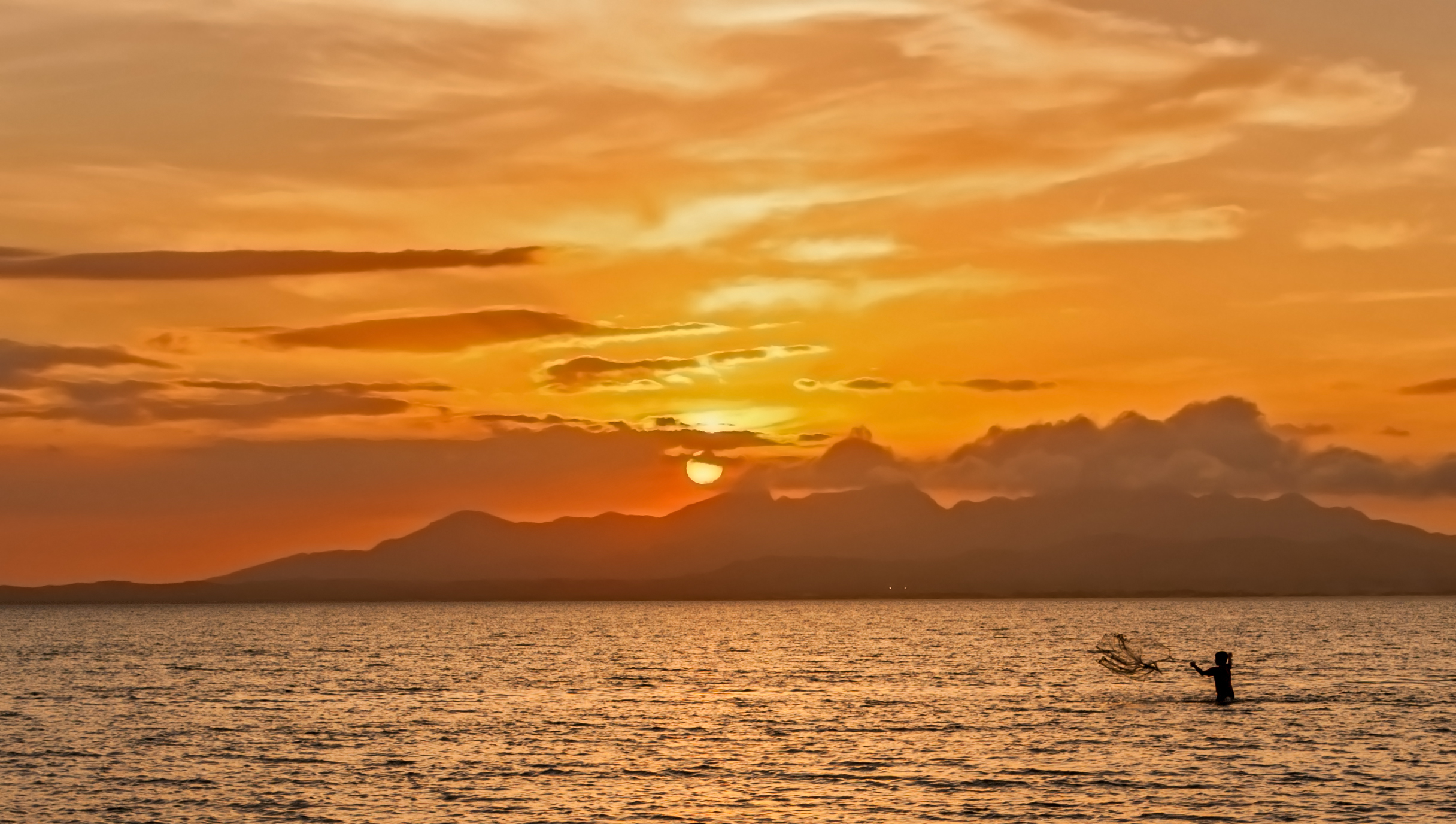
Mountains near Laguna de Raya

The road ascends and runs through this wide It is a valley with numerous curves, crossing the mountain through some trenches that have been artificially dug to avoid too steep a slope. To the north, on the right of the road when you go to San Francisco the ground rises again forming a kind of mini mountain range with three or four elongated hills separated from each other by valleys that together form a continuous ridge in a northeasterly direction that occupies the geomorphological overhang that breaks the uniformity of the rectangular perimeter of the peninsula, which, in this area projects as a rocky promontory that falls abruptly to the sea, forming cliffs Slope hills northwest of the Serranía, "the miniserranía", which fall to the sea in the area of "The Maguey". In the foreground, view of the desolate plain to the northwest of it.

Of very steep slopes and in some places practically vertical. From the northwest, This small mountain range stands out clearly as two elongated hills of similar height, separated by a well-defined watercourse. On the eastern slope, the main mountain range loses height sharply, however, until almost Boca del Río it extends in a sequence of rounded hills of little height that in their majority are of reddish sandstones and sparse, xerophilic, or absent, vegetation of aspect, but that at sunset acquires tonalities of surprising serenity and singular beauty. All of them are crossed by more or less deep ravines. To the north, the valley formed by the amphitheater of the high hills opens up to sea, but its lateral slopes also descend in hills of reddish sandstone until Partial view of the slope western part of the Serranía.

The coast leaving between the road and the sea a wide strip of coastline in which cliffs and coves. These last ones, because they are protected from the direct action of the dominant winds, allow the sands to be deposited forming beaches like those of Tunar, La Wall or The Mule. In some cases, already over the sea, there are isolated hills that stand out of the rest of the landscape as in La Pared and La Mula. The main mountain range has a relief of steep slopes and sharp peaks, forming a cut profile of steep slopes extremely characteristic and unmistakable, with a strong personality. From west to east, the names of some of these hills, of evocative and sonorous indigenous names, are: Cerro de Narciso, La Soledad, Risco Blanco, The Congo, Los Cedros (the highest), followed by Sacamanteca on the south side, Although according to the farmers their real name and without a doubt the original is Guainamal, others call it Macanao.

Mamantón, Cerro de L'aguá, Tapacular and Campanario. Between Manglillo and Guayacancito, Near the edge of the road are the hills of Sabio and Pendejo which are of lesser height. La Soledad or Guainamal is the real Cerro Macanao. On the northern sides The hills of Gavilán and Guarataro stand out.

=== Macanao ===
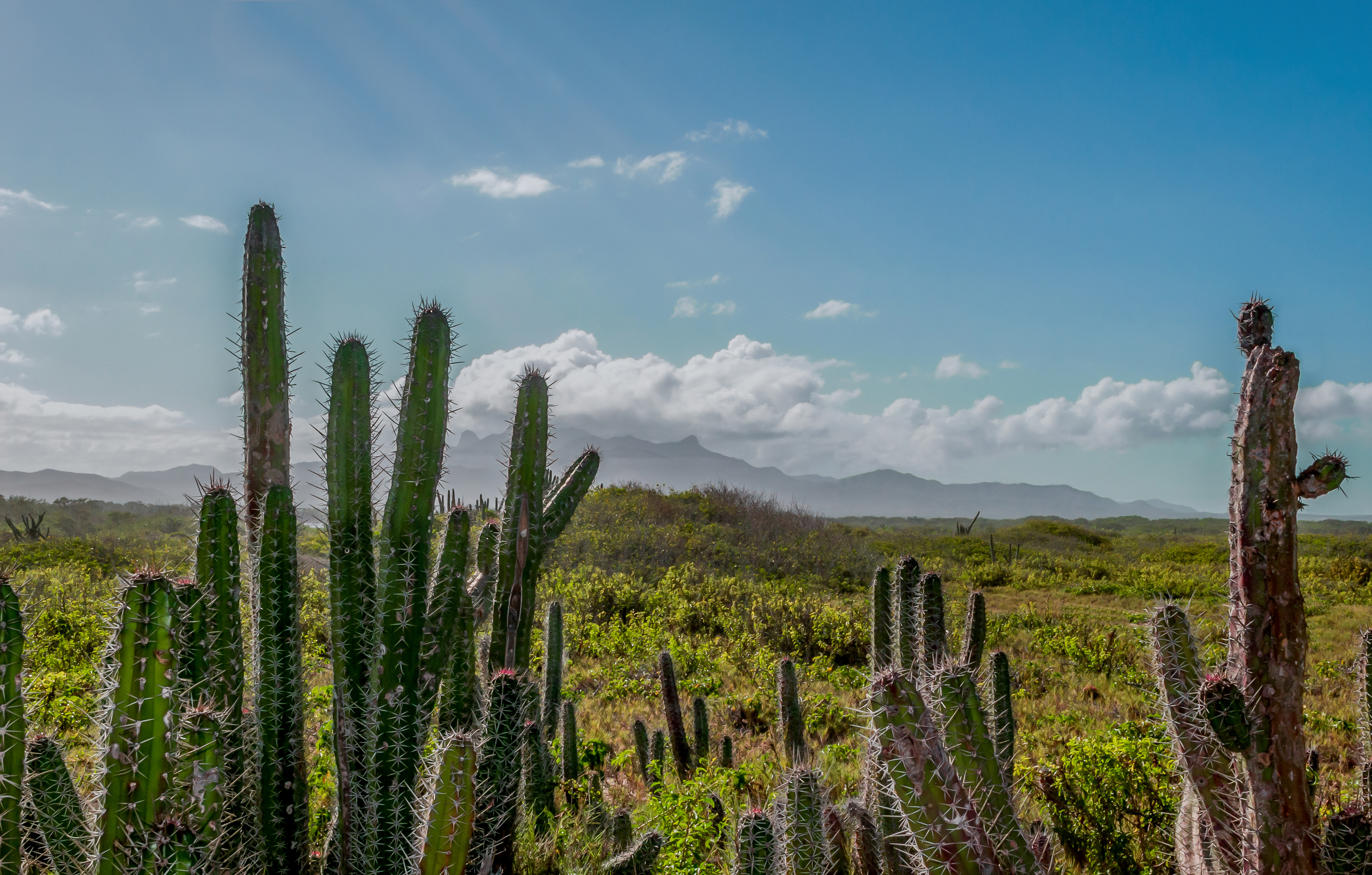
Stenocereus heptagonus from Macanao Peninsula

With an extension of 330 km^{2} (130 sq mi) and a rectangular contour of 23 km (14 mi) in length and 14 km 14 km (8.7 mi) in width, Macanao forms the western portion of Margarita Island. Macanao is actually a tied island linked to the eastern portion of Margarita by La Restinga, a tombolo (i.e. sandbar). La Restinga separates the open sea from the Lagoon of La Restinga. The indigenous name for the lagoon is Arapano.

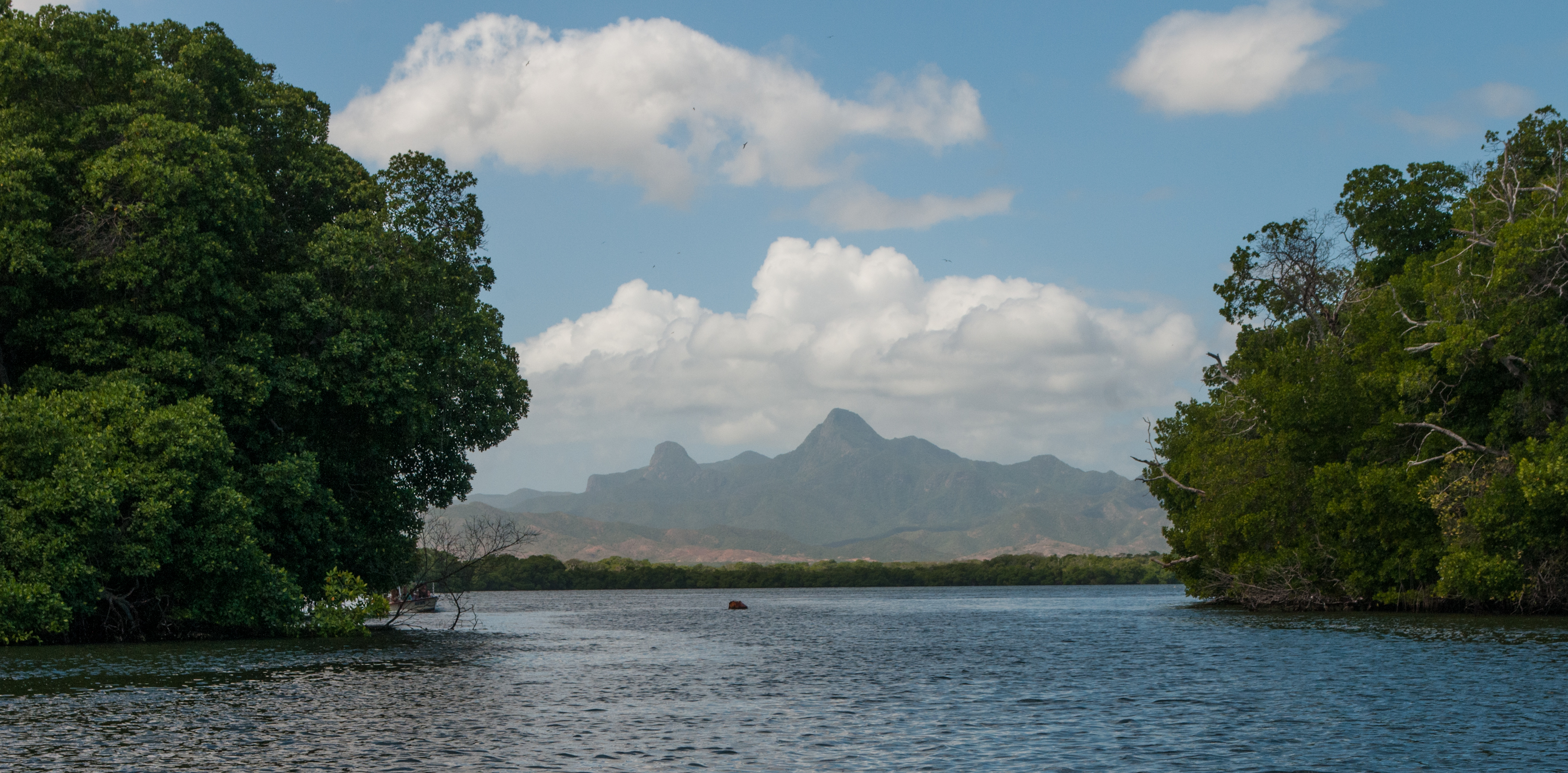
Macanao hill from La Restinga Lagoon

The sandbar is about 22 km (14 mi) long and the lagoon has an extension of 23 km^{2} (8.9 sq mi). Its western end, which borders the Macanao landmass, receives the denomination of El Saco, zone that was habitually visited by the flamingos or tococos that formed a pink stain visible from afar; then, when they lift up their flight they offer a show of incomparable color quality, especially when the sun's rays from the dusk, already oblique, they make stand out, with variety of soft shades, the pink color of the birds and their "jet" plane morphology with the neck stretched out and the wings placed in the center of the fuselage, long and slender. From the geomorphological and landscape point of view, the Peninsula is characterized by presence of a mountain range (whose highest hill reaches 745 m) that occupies the entire portion of the peninsula, leaving free only, to the south, a coastal strip more or less wide that forms cliffs on the sea, terraces of filling, mouth of ravines or extensive salinetas that were ancient lagoons formed as a result of the interaction between sea currents and the contributions of the rivers whose joint action created a restinga or bar.

Later, the sedimentary contribution dragged by the torrents that descend from the hills filled them, leaving only the sandy elevation of the restinga, which separates them from the sea above the level of the clay substrate of the salineta, for that reason, in the season of big rains they fill up again with water and become slippery plains of clay or mud, impassable. In this coastal strip, which is between the road and the sea, There is an abundance of debris: fragments of metamorphic rocks, stones and earth that have been the hills; and on which grows a poor xerophilic vegetation more or less dense. Among the cliffs there are beaches on which the fishermen's ranches settled around which the towns were formed.

=== Climate ===
The average temperature is 32 °C (90 °F) with minimum ranging between 22 °C (72 °F) and 23 °C (73 °F) and maximum that can easily exceed 34 °C (93 °F). Rainfall is common in the winter months and rainy season that begins July–October (although the rain is usually quite rare). Being located in the Caribbean Sea near the Earth's equator, solar rays fall perpendicularly on the island and therefore it is advisable to always use some sort of sunscreen when visiting its beaches.

== Municipalities ==

Political Territorial Division of Nueva Esparta
Municipality	Capital	Surface	Population	Density (km²)
Antolín del Campo	La Plaza de Paraguachí	72 km²	21,890	305.30
Arismendi	La Asunción	52 km²	23,616	454.15
Díaz	San Juan Bautista	166 km²	39,491	238.04
García	El Valle del Espíritu Santo	85 km²	49,967	587.16
Gómez	Santa Ana	96 km²	33,436	349.38
Maneiro	Pampatar	35 km²	35,901	1,028.68
Marcano	Juan Griego	40 km²	31,959	796.98
Mariño	Porlamar	39 km²	85,942	2,203.64
Península de Macanao^{1)}	Boca del Río	331 km²	5,205	69.26
Tubores^{2)}	Punta de Piedras	180 km²	30,062	167.10
Villalba	San Pedro de Coche	55 km²	80,238	218.33
Nueva Esparta	La Asunción	1,150 km²	387,175	336.67

== Cities ==
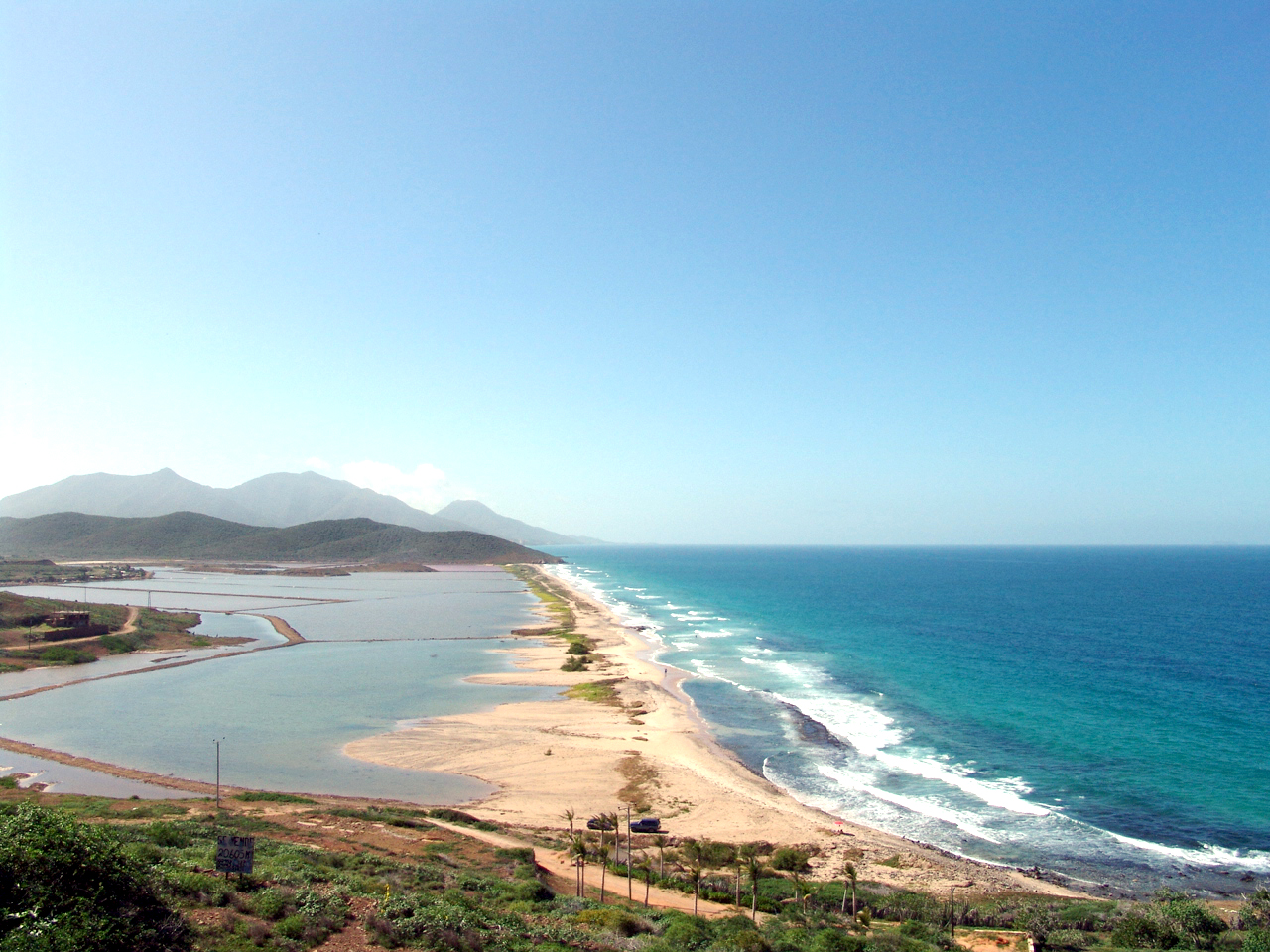
Playa La Salina near Pampatar

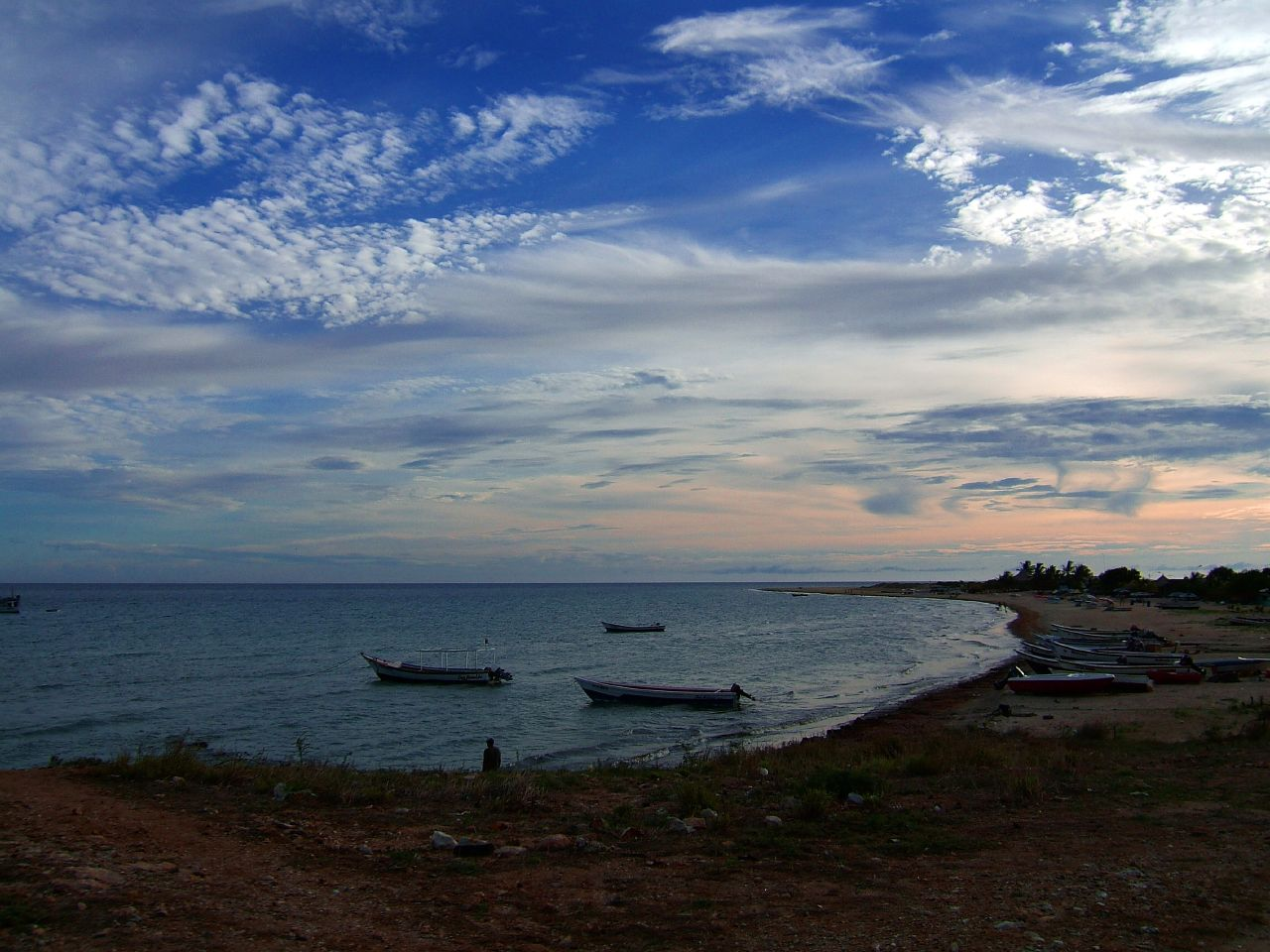
Playa Punta Arenas

La Asunción is the capital of the Federal State of Nueva Esparta with a population of around 28,500. It is the seat of the regional government. The city is overlooked by the Santa Rosa de la Eminencia castle.

The urban area of Pampatar has a population of around 50,000. A number of the island's larger shopping malls are located in the city, namely Sambil Margarita, Rattan Depot, Centro Comercial La Vela, Centro Comercial Costa Azul, Centro Comercial AB (Avenida Bolivar) and La Redoma. The San Carlos de Borromeo Fortress, constructed in the late 17th century, is located in Pampatar. The city also has several beaches.

The largest city on Margarita Island is Porlamar. The population can reach 125,000 in the high season, while in the low season, the population is about 85,000. Two beaches are located within the city. The island's major airport, Santiago Mariño Caribbean International Airport, is located near Porlamar. Margarita can be reached by direct flights from Caracas or ferries from Puerto la Cruz, Cumaná, and La Guaira.

Juan Griego is a city on the northern side of Isla Margarita, and is the most northern port in Venezuela. It has a population of 28,256 inhabitants (as per census of 2001) and is the capital of the Marcano municipality of the Nueva Esparta state. Its Gothic-style church, constructed in 1850 by Fray Nicholas de Igualdad, is still, along with the lovely bay, the symbol of the city. The La Galera fortress, where in the early 1820s a fierce battle for independence was fought, is located near the city centre. In 1973, the island become a free port and the city once again become the second city of commercial importance after Porlamar.

== Population ==
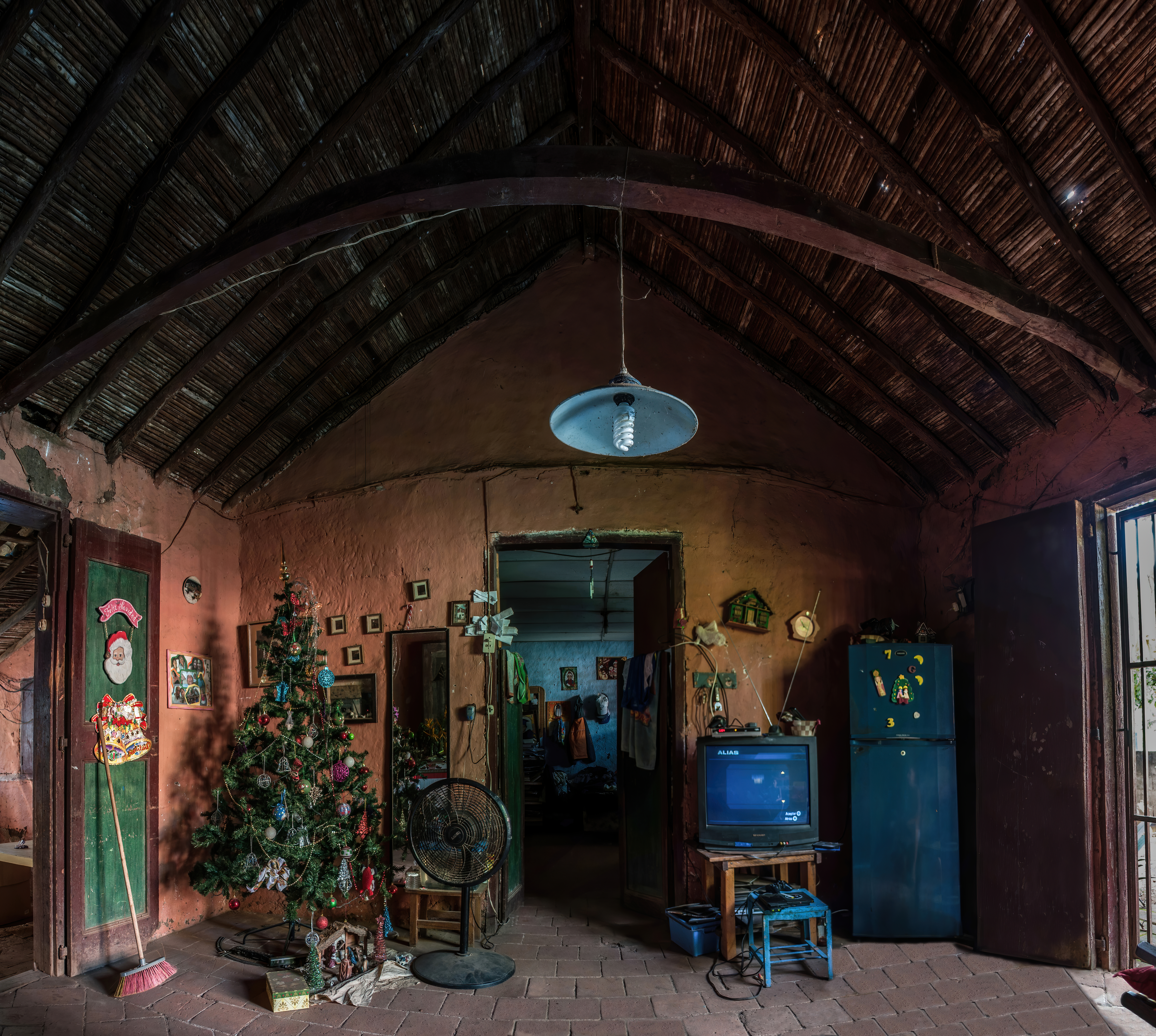
A typical house in San Juan Bautista

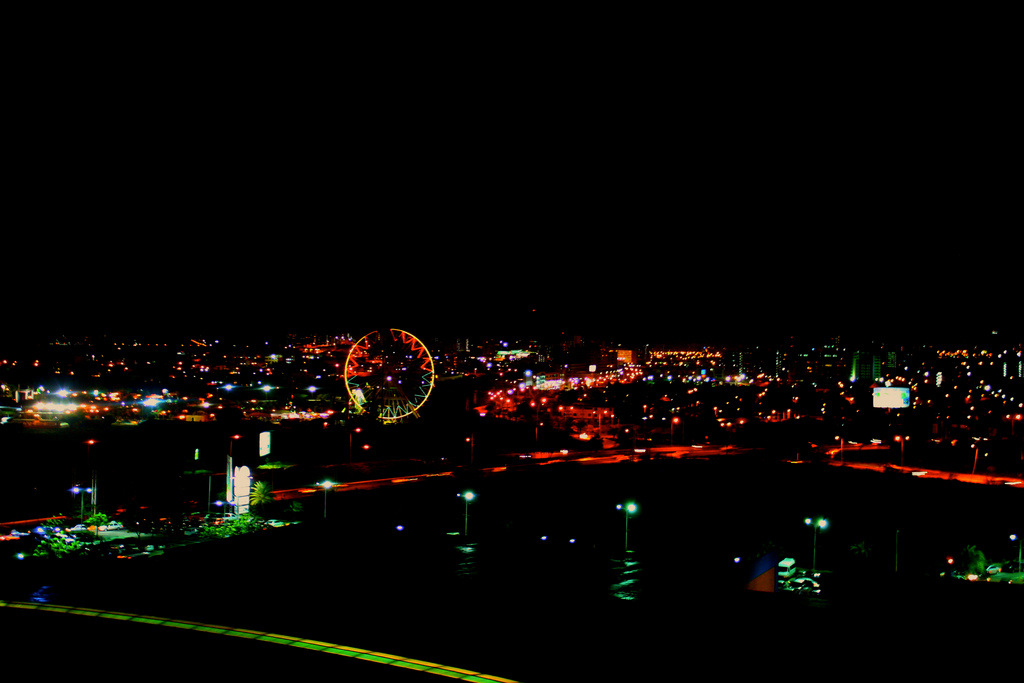
View of Margarita island at night

The demonym for islanders is Margariteños/as and Neoespartanos/as.

Ethnic minority populations of some significance include descendants of West Africans enslaved by the Spaniards, Lebanese, Syrians, Spanish, Italians, Germans, French, Dutch, Swedes, Norwegians, Danes, Portuguese, Argentines, Chileans, Uruguayans, Colombians, and Chinese.

Immigrants from mainland Venezuela are colloquially called navegaos by islanders.

A little less than 25% of the Neoespartanian population live in Porlamar. Margarita's population is just under 440,000, although this tends to fluctuate during holiday periods and the festive season.

== Religion ==
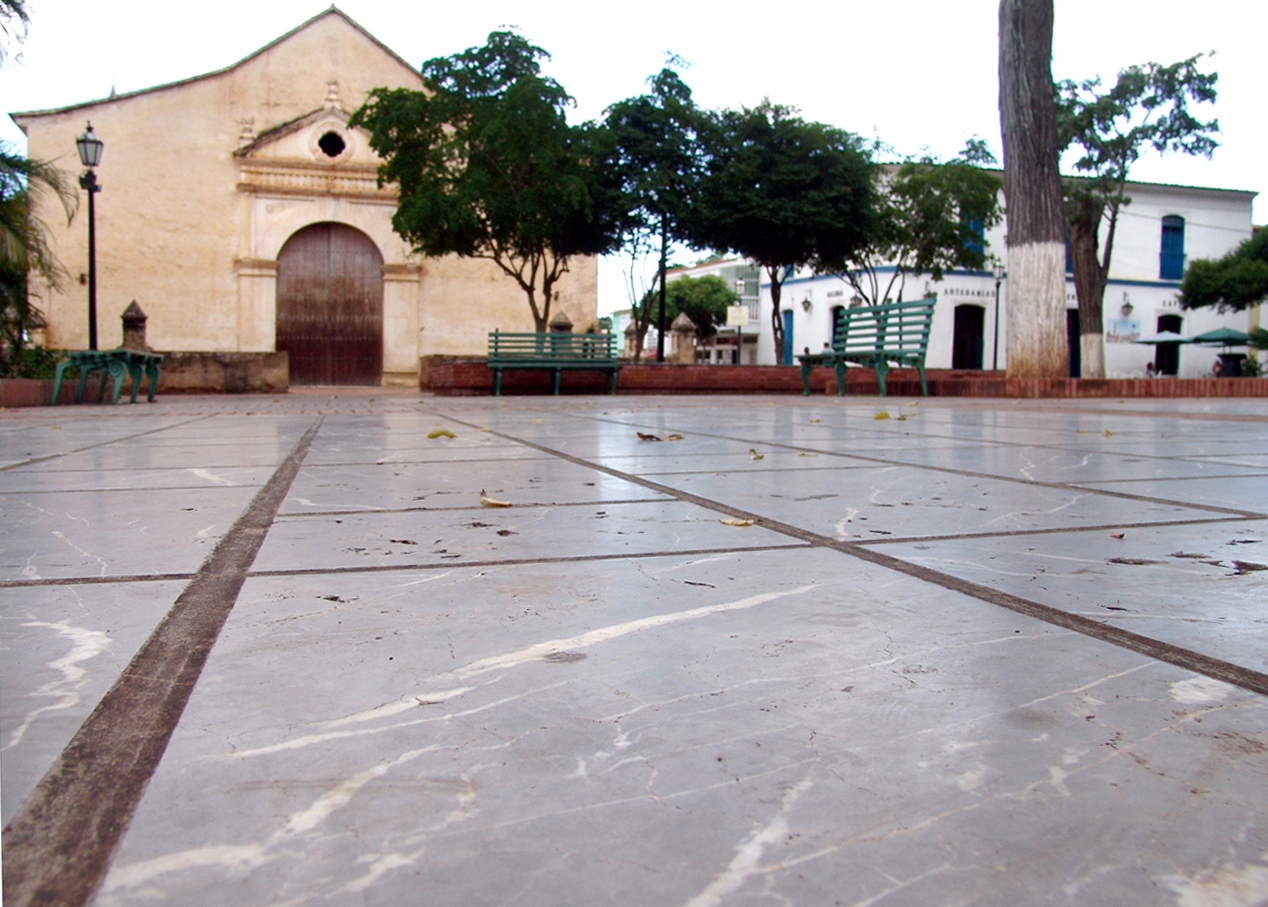
Front facade of La Asunción Cathedral

The predominant religion is Catholicism. Other Christian denominations are also present. Of the churches that present in the Neospartan entity, among the most important are: Basilica of Our Lady of El Valle (in the Valley of the Espíritu Santo), La Asunción Cathedral, Iglesia San Juan Evangelista (Juangriego), Iglesia parroquial de San Juan (San Juan Bautista), Iglesia de San Nicolás de Bari (Porlamar), of the San José de Paraguachi and other churches and chapels minor located in populations of Santa Ana, Punta de Piedras, Porlamar, Pampatar and virtually all the towns of the island. There are also small populations of Jews and Muslims.

Evangelical Christian churches have had a significant growth in recent years demonstrating their presence and impact in the population of the island. One of the fastest-growing is the Centro Cristiano Casa de Alabanza (CCCA), present in Porlamar, Juan Griego, La Asunción and Tubores Municipality.

The patron saint of eastern Venezuela is the Virgen del Valle. In the population El Valle del Espíritu Santo is the Basílica Menor de Nuestra Señora del Valle, which approaching Margarita, Coche and Cubagua islanders visit to honor her on her feast day.

== Natural heritage ==
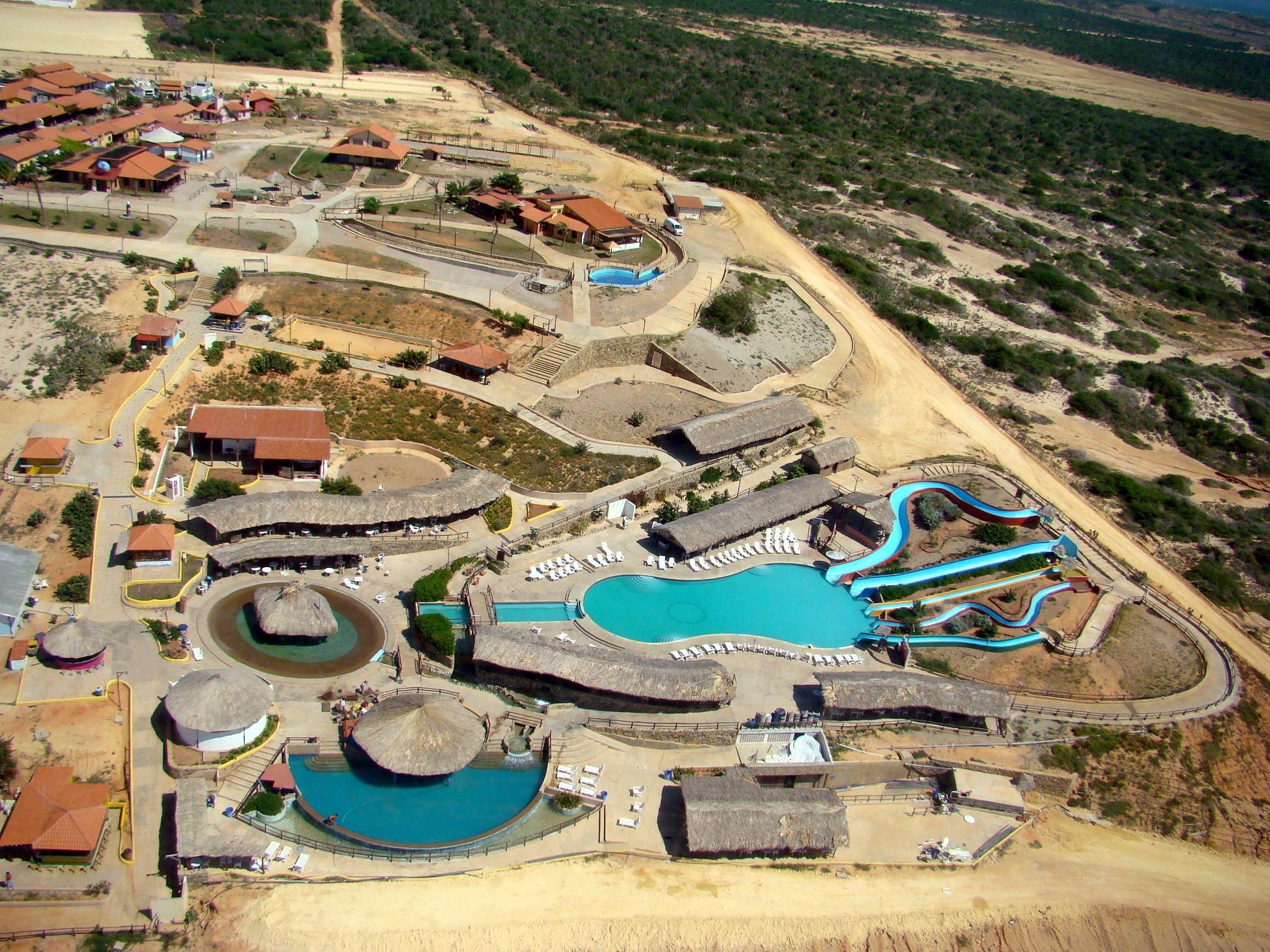
El Reino Musipán amusement park

=== Las Tetas de María Guevara ===
The Tetas de Maria Guevara ("Maria Guevara's breasts"), located in a coastal plain in the south of the 1,670 hectare Laguna de La Restinga National Park, are two small twin hills with a height of 135 metres (443 ft). The vegetation around the hills is desert, with cacti, prickly pears, yaks, guamaches. The fauna is diverse, including desert lizards, rabbits, rattlesnakes and coral.

The legend told by the inhabitants of the island goes that the name María Guevara comes from a white young girl who was heavily involved in the War of Independence and that upon her death, the hills rose on her grave. Another Margaritan myth says the source of the name also comes from the same woman, but that she was from Cumaná and came to the island to lead a group of men in fishing activities. As she had small breasts, by way of derision whenever they sighted the hills said, "there are the lady's tits" and the name was created. The area was declared a national park on February 27, 1974.

== Crime ==
Since the beginning of the crisis in Venezuela, the primary industry of tourism has declined 90% between 2010 and 2020. The island is currently affected by organized crime and is recognized as an international hub for the illegal drug trade.

=== Drug trafficking ===
Multiple international intelligence organizations have focused their investigations on Isla Margarita as being a major center of organized crime. According to the CIA World Factbook, Margarita Island is the location of significant narcotics-related money-laundering activity.

Several notable investigations, News reports, and policy analyses show that the Island serves as a logistic and financial hub for Hezbollah. Its activity on the Island has increased during the early 2000s onwards, becoming an important role as a financial and logistic center for Hezbollah. News reports on the Financial Times, Foreign Policy as well as analysis on IranWire and Radio Farda, detail that the Island is an attractive spot due to its duty-free status, weak oversight, and a sizable Lebanese diaspora, which Hezbollah used in order to exploit for money laundering, drug trafficking, and coordination activities. US officials and security experts have often described the Island as a safe place for fundraising, travel, and meetings, sometimes connected to wider criminal networks linked to the Venezuelan government. The island is also claimed to house formal training camps, allegations that were mainly originated from intelligence reports and congressional testimonies.

=== Violent crime ===
Since 2010, there have been numerous instances of tourist murders. On 27 August 2010, an Italian tourist, Emiliano Astore, was murdered on his boat anchored off Margarita Island in an apparent robbery. Two police officers and a civilian were arrested. A third officer was implicated in the "exploitation of objects" from the crime.

On 18 July 2011, 28-year-old Briton Tom Ossel was killed resisting seven armed robbers who had tricked their way into the Posada Casa Rosa backpackers' hotel in Playa El Agua before they took the guests hostage and raided rooms for valuables.

On 29 March 2011, French tourist Yves Le Bras was murdered in a robbery at the Laguna Mar hotel, while he and his wife dined at the Guacuco restaurant. In March 2011, Belgian tourist Philippe Bonne was murdered while eating in a fast food outlet in Playa El Agua, Margarita.

On 20 January 2012, about 30 or 35 Brazilian tourists were robbed in their hotel in Antolin del Campo, Margarita, by a gang of between 13 and 15 armed robbers.

On 3 September 2013, a Dutch sailor was killed on his yacht while resisting armed robbers attempting to board his boat.

On 7 February 2014, a few hours after arriving on the island, German cruise ship passenger Horst Kurt Fritz was killed by two gunmen on a motorcycle at a shop near the Sambil shopping center.

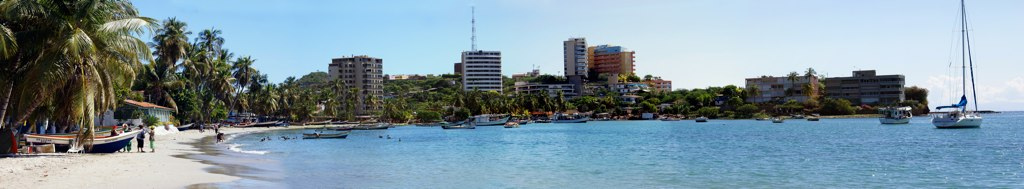
Panorama of Margarita Island

== See also ==
- Cariaco Basin
