= Laguna de la Restinga =

National park in Venezuela

- IUCN category II (national park)
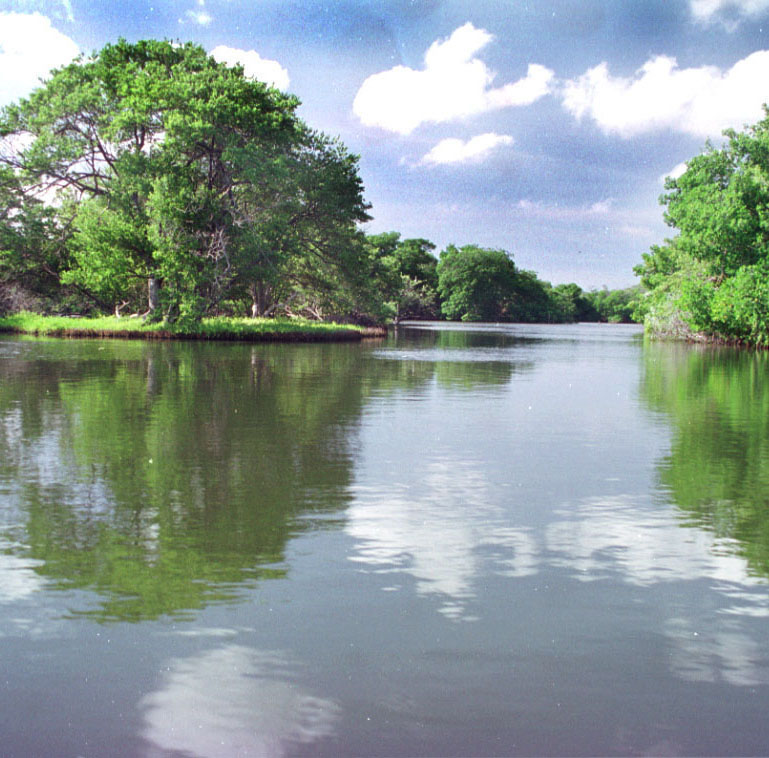

- Location within Venezuela
- Location: Isla Margarita, Venezuela
- Coordinates: 10°59′20″N 64.°09′10″W
- Area: 188 square kilometres (73 sq mi)
- Established: 6 February 1974
- Governing body: INPARQUES
- Website: www.inparques.gob.ve/index.php?parques=view&codigo=pn_0012&sec=1

Ramsar Wetland
- Designated: 4 September 1996
- Reference no.: 857

Laguna de la Restinga is a national park on the Isla Margarita, Nueva Esparta state, Venezuela. The main part of the park is a large salt lagoon, rich in fish and birdlife. It is on the Ramsar list of wetlands of international importance, and is classified as an Important Bird Area.

== Location ==
The park lies between the eastern part of Margarita island and the Macanao Peninsula, which are connected only by a thin bar, or strip of land. The bar stretches more than 15 miles (24 km) from La Guardia on the main island to Punta Tigre on the peninsula. The park was created by government decree on 6 February 1974, and initially covered an area of 10,700 hectares (26,000 acres). It features a 2,500 hectares (6,200 acres) saline lagoon fringed by mangroves and holding large mangrove islands, with 18 kilometres (11 mi) of channels. The shallow lagoon is separated from the sea to the north by a bar of sand and sea shells. To the south a broad channel connects the lagoon with the sea. The west coast is rocky, with cliffs and small beaches. The climate is arid or semi-arid, with mean annual temperature of 27 °C (81 °F) and mean annual precipitation of 300 to 400 millimetres (12 to 16 in).

== Flora ==
The park is in Venezuelan Dry Forest biogeographical province. Inside the lagoon there are mangrove forests covering 910 hectares (2,200 acres) containing red mangrove (Rhizophora mangle), black mangrove (Avicennia nitida) and 1 hectare (2.5 acres) of white mangrove (Laguncularia racemosa). The sandbar has buttonwood mangrove (Conocarpus erectus) and various types of grass. The land surrounding the saltwater is covered by xerophytes. The semi-desert tropical climate supports thornwood and shrub forest.

== Fauna ==
The lagoon, at most 8 feet (2.4 m) deep, is home to red snappers, gruntfish, sardines, swordfish and black mullets. Oysters cling to the mangrove roots. Birds that feed in the lagoon include scarlet ibis, red-legged tinamous, frigatebirds, blue herons, green herons, great egrets, ground doves, cormorants and flamingos. Three endemic land species are present: the deer Odocoileus carriacou margaritae, the rabbit Sylvilagus floridanus margaritae and the snake Leptotyphlops albifrons margaritae.

== Tourism ==
Tourists can reach the embarkation pier in the lagoon by bus from Porlamar. Five seat motorboats from there take visitors for a trip through the interconnecting channels through the mangroves, some with romantic names like Mi Dulce Amor (My Sweet Love) or Túnel de los Enamorados (Lovers Tunnel). The boats take visitors to an open-air shack serving fresh fried fish on a shell beach.

== Gallery ==
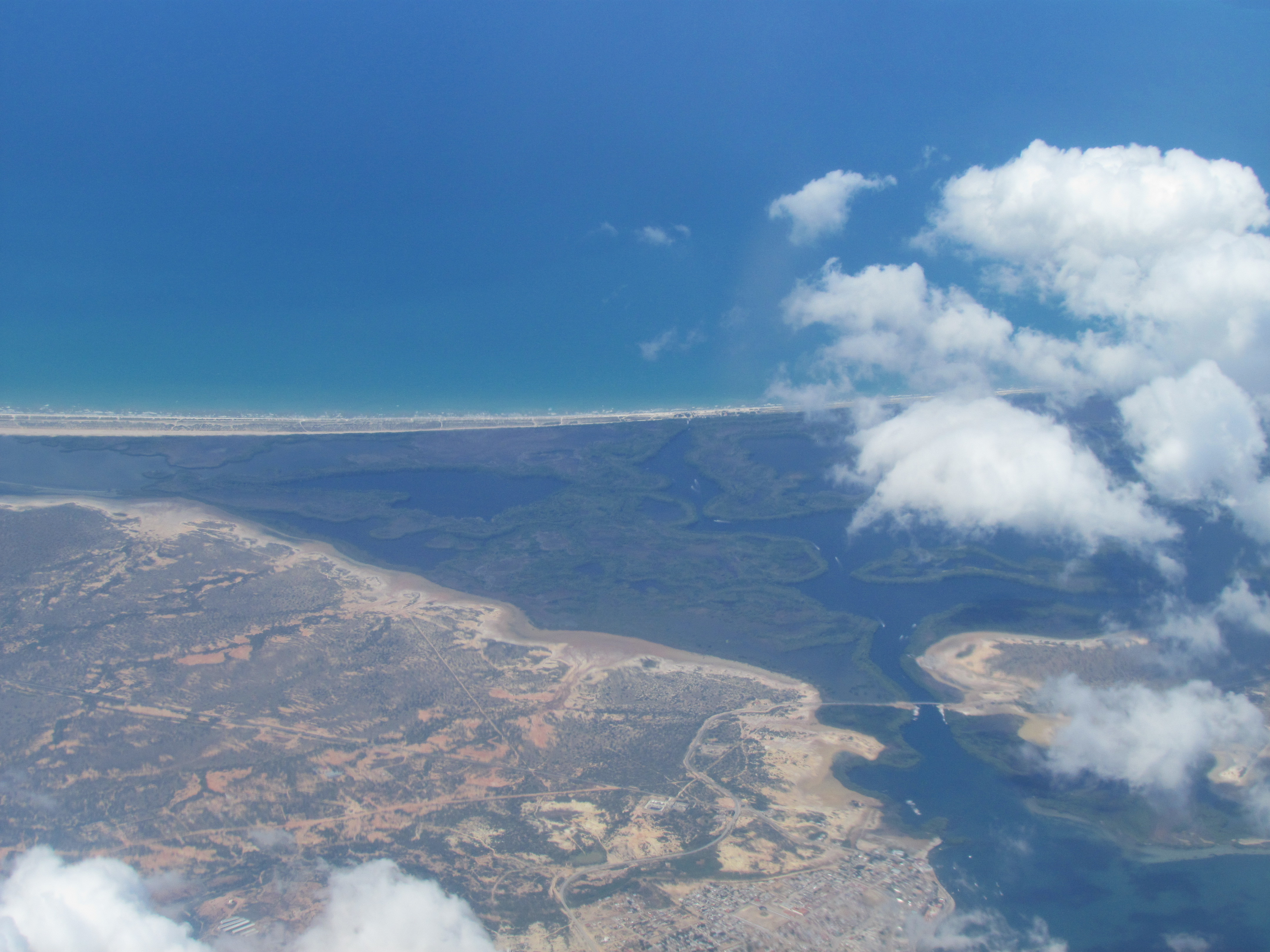
View from the air

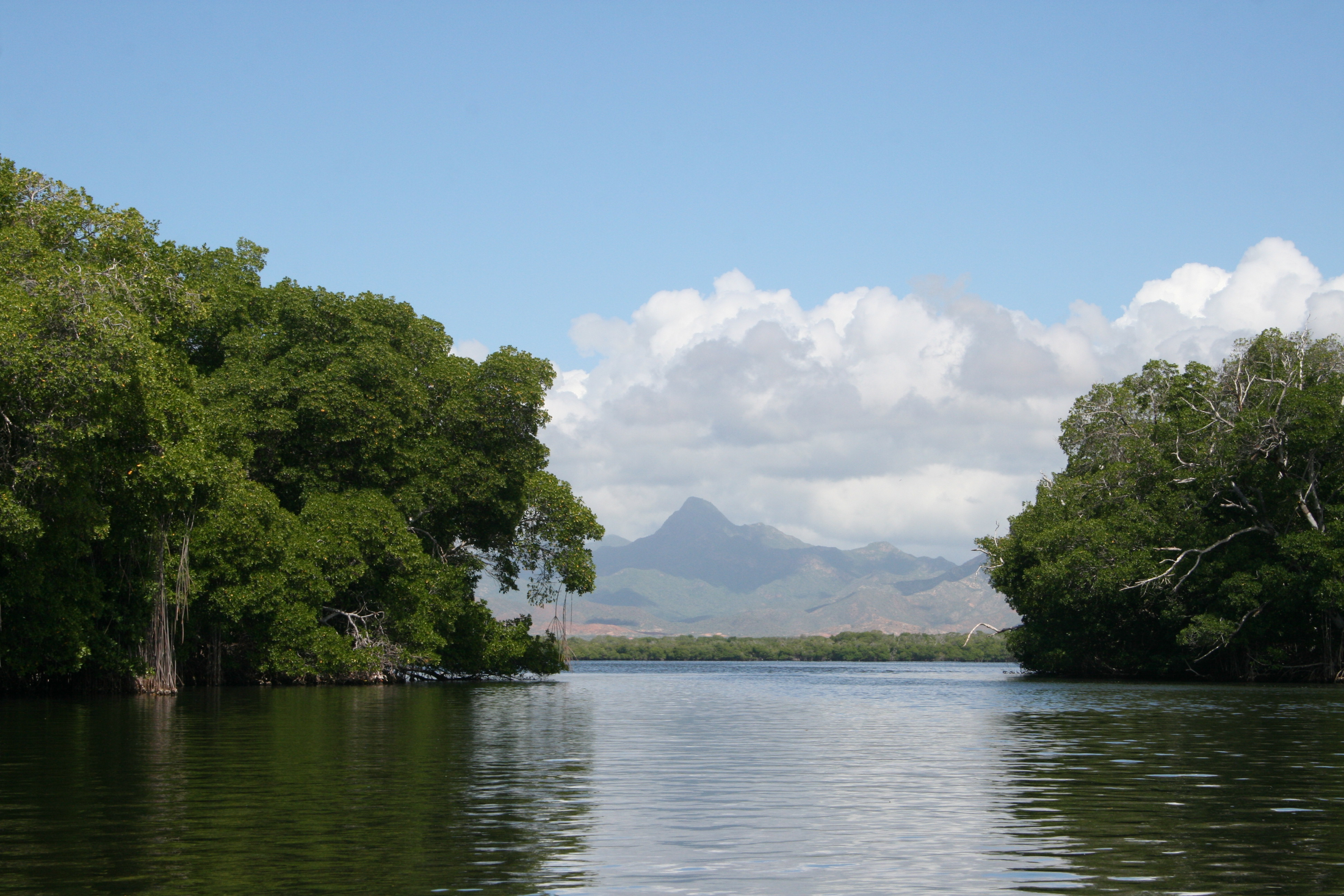
The lagoon looking west towards Peninsula de Macanao

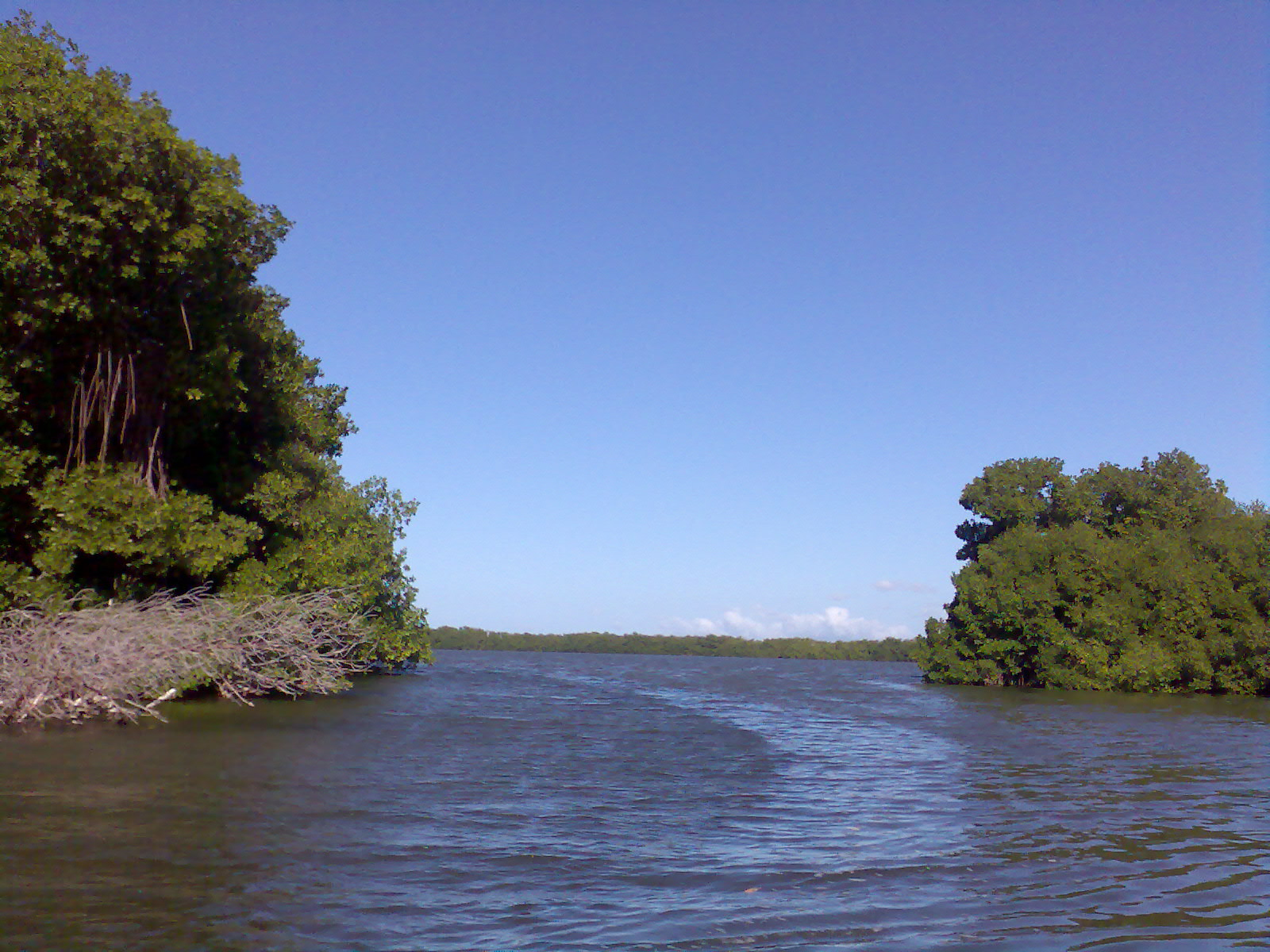
Lagoon

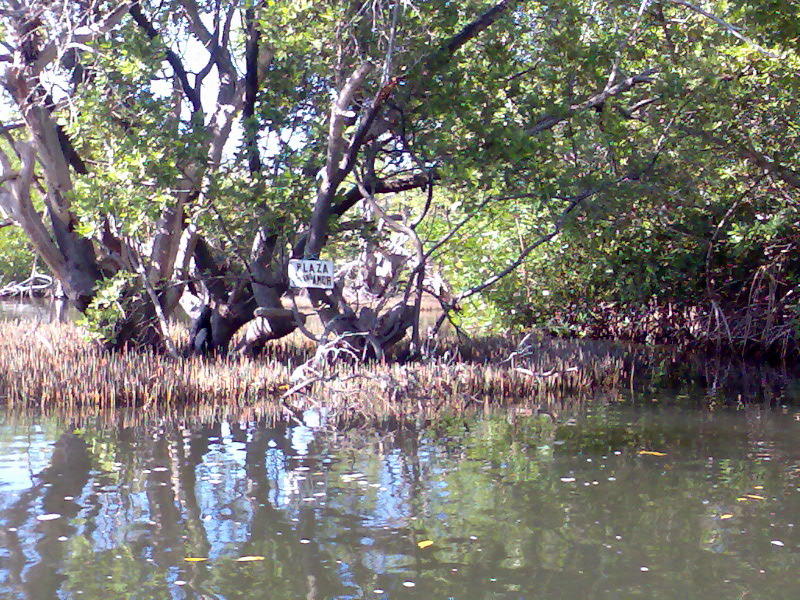
Channel in the mangroves

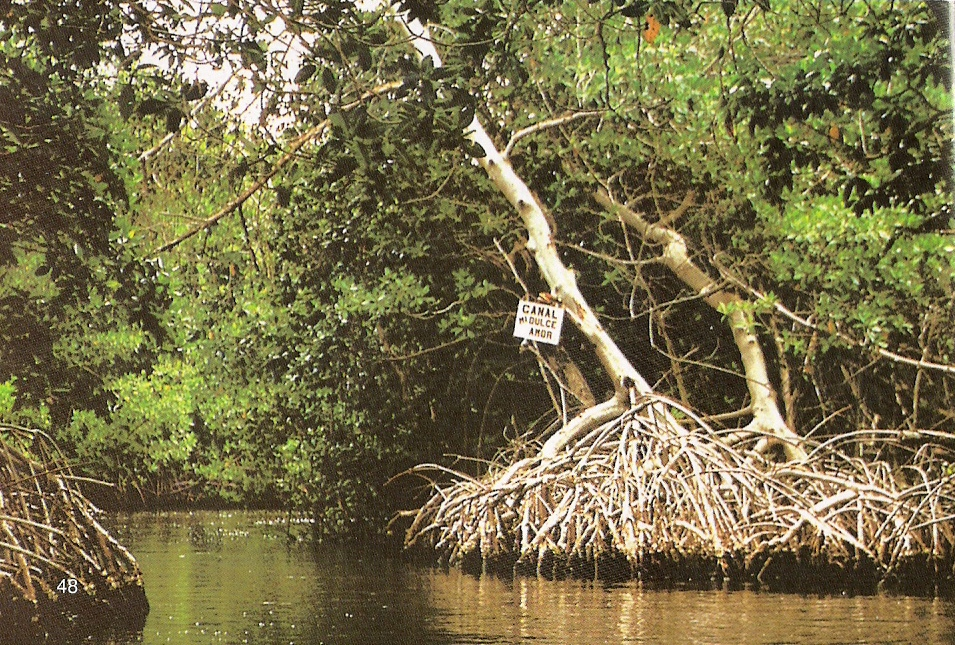
Channel in the mangroves

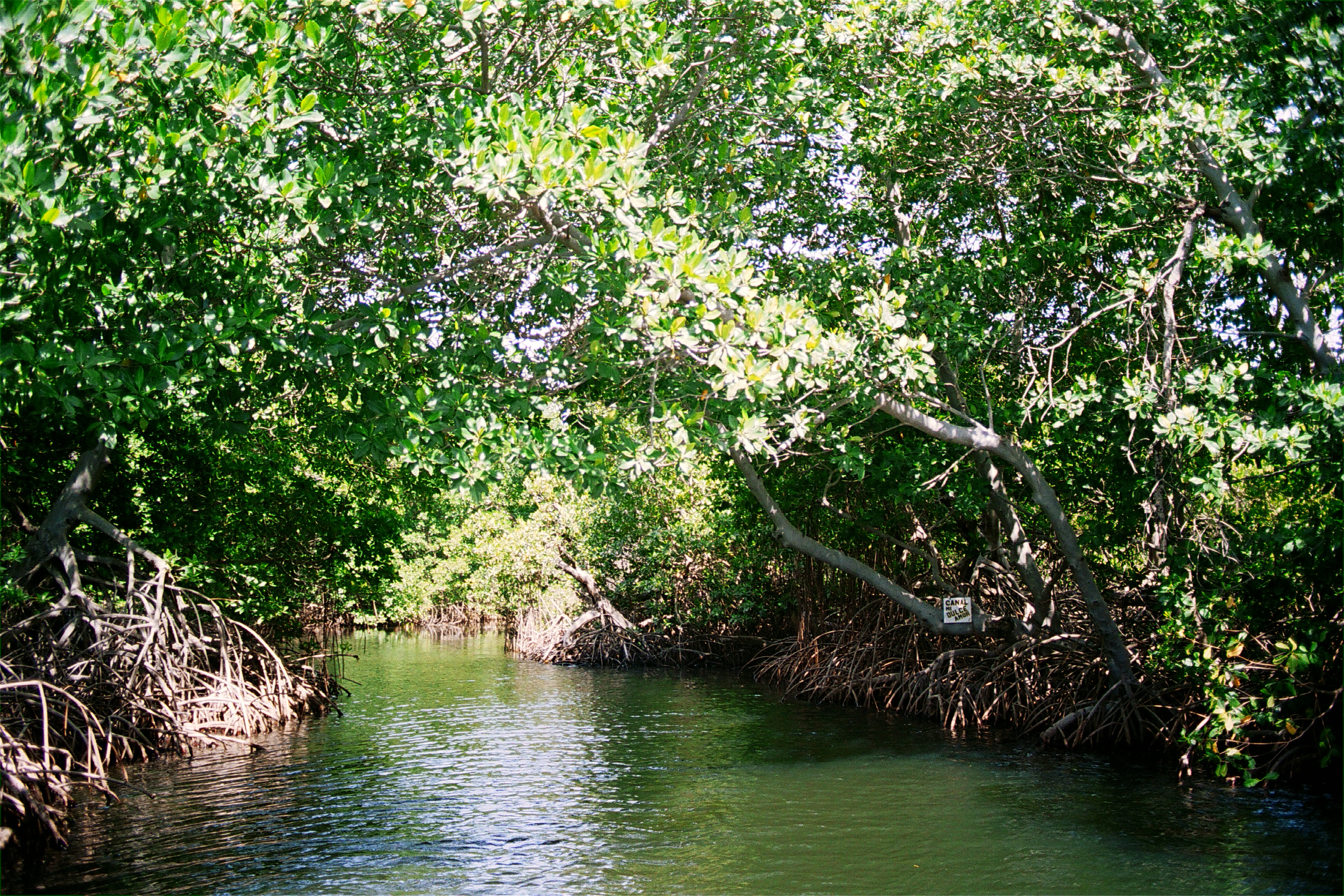
Channel in the mangroves

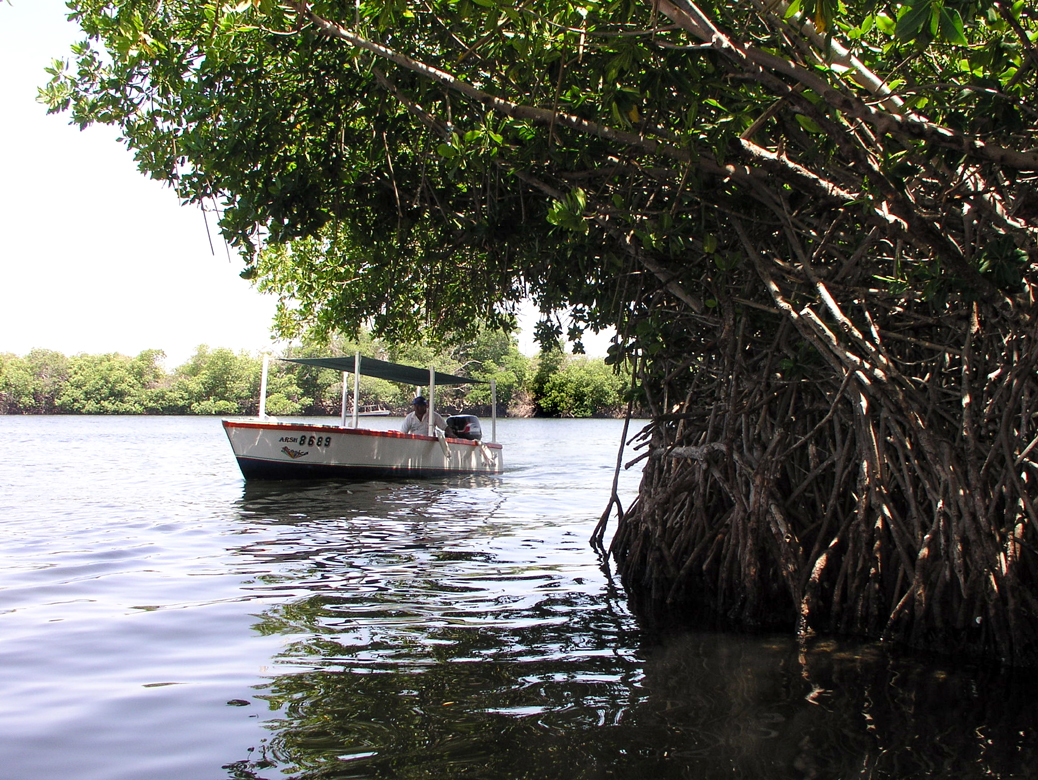
A boat in the lagoon

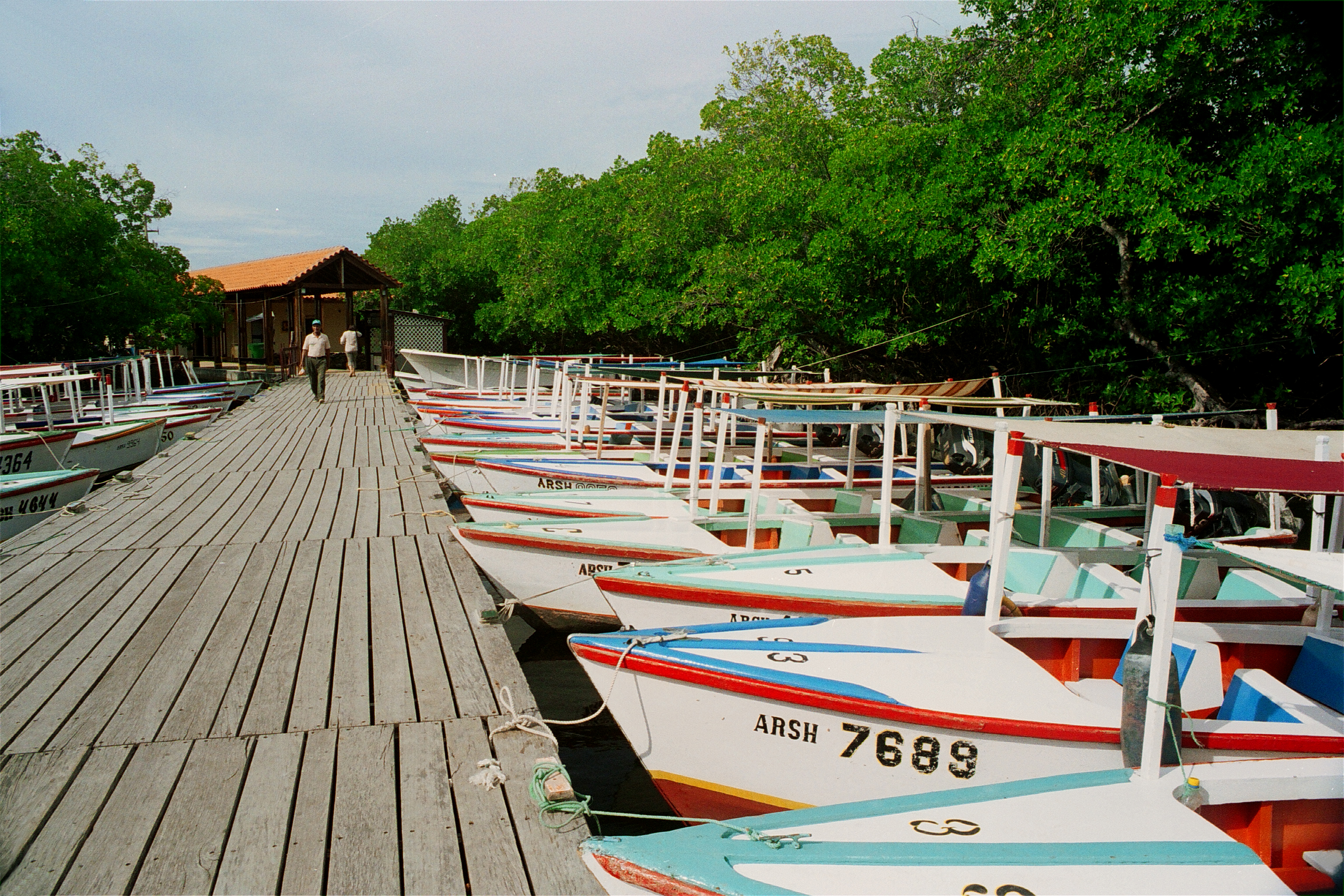
Rental boats
