= Antonio Díaz Municipality, Nueva Esparta =

Municipality in the state of Nueva Esparta, Venezuela

Antonio Díaz Municipality Municipio Antonio Díaz
- Municipality
- Municipio Antonio Díaz
- Coat of arms

- Location in Nueva Esparta

- Location in Venezuela
- Coordinates: 10°57′43″N 63°58′13″W
- Country: Venezuela
- State: Nueva Esparta

Government
  - Mayor: Kendy Graterol Cordero (PSUV)

Area
  - Total: 158.4 km^{2} (61.2 sq mi)
- Time zone: UTC−4 (VET)

Antonio Díaz is one of the eleven municipalities on Margarita Island in the state of Nueva Esparta, Venezuela. It is located in the center-east of the island and covers an area of 165.9 km^{2}. As of 2011, it had a population of 71,466 inhabitants. The municipality's capital is the town of San Juan Bautista, situated in the valley of the same name.

== History ==
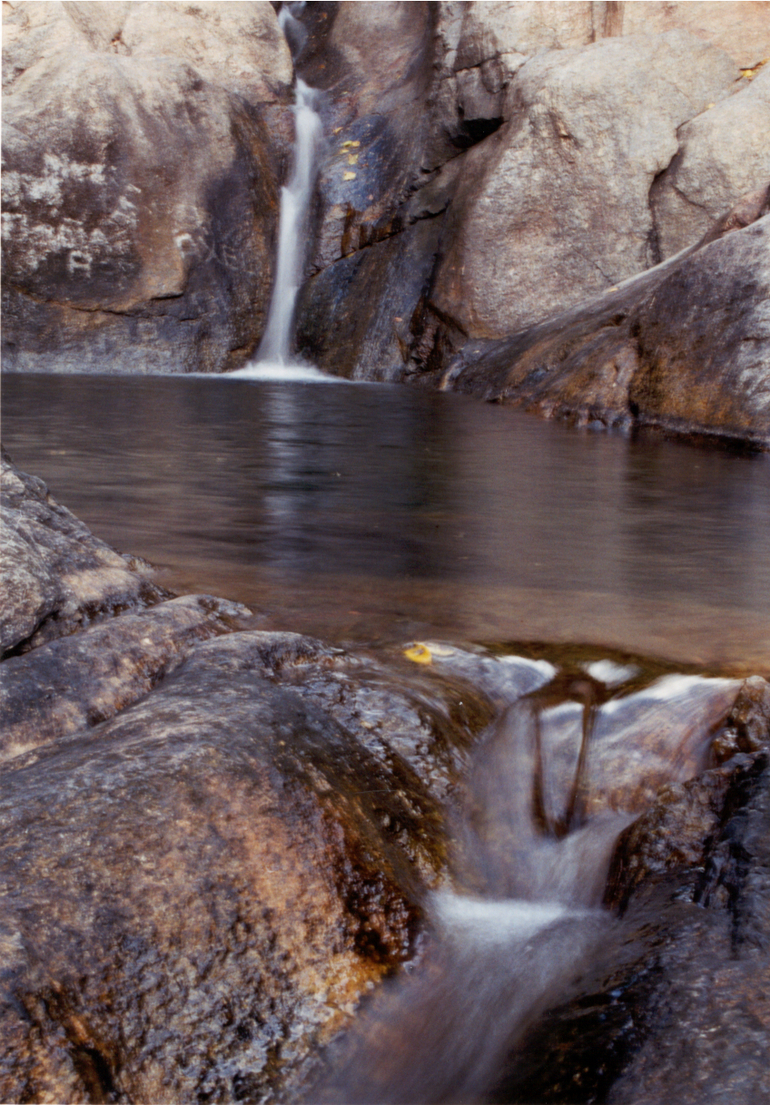
Ponds of Fuentidueño, freshwater springs in the Valley of San Juan Bautista

In 1525, ancient settlers from Cubagua Island, searching for fresh water, arrived in the Valley of San Juan. Attracted by several freshwater springs, mild weather, and fertile lands suitable for raising livestock and planting, they decided to settle there. In 1529, San Juan Bautista was founded by Pedro de Alegría, the first Spanish commune on Margarita Island. Alegría, who succeeded Francisco Fajardo and was the first European settler on the island, established himself in San Juan. He founded a cattle estate while serving as Lieutenant and Governor of Margarita and representing the heirs of Marcelo Villalobos.
