= Playa El Agua =

Beach at Margarita Island, Venezuela

Coordinates: 11.1455°N 63.863°W

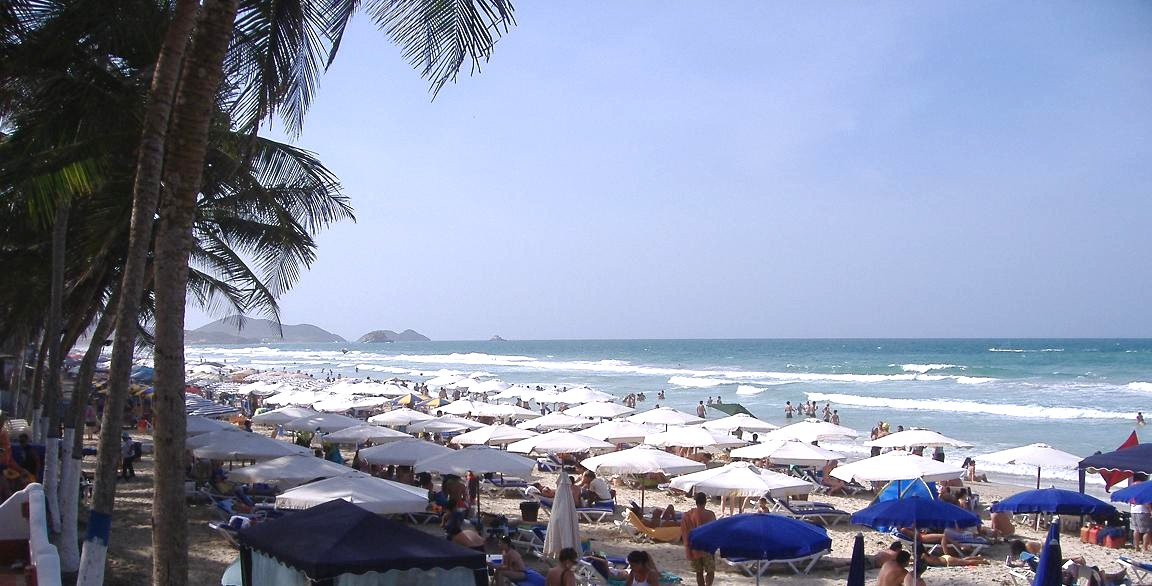
Playa El Agua, famous for its beauty and variety of services

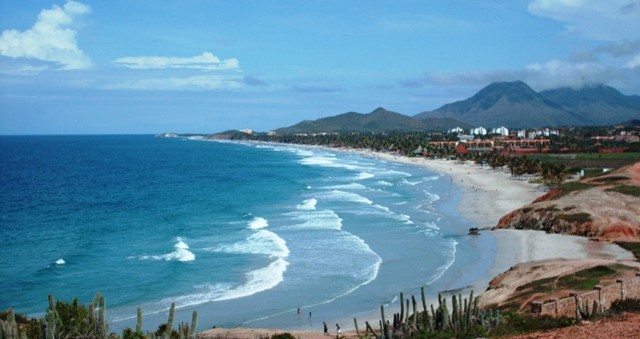
Playa El Agua

Playa El Agua is the most famous tourist development on Margarita Island in Venezuela.

El Agua is 2.5 miles (4 km) long, 30m wide, gold sand lined with huge palm trees that give shelter to numerous restaurants that provide service to diners on the beach. The boulevard at Playa El Agua stretches for approximately 2 miles (3 km). While there are open stretches, most of the ocean side is lined by restaurants and shops. This beach is favored by both locals and visitors.
