= Almirante Brown Department =

- Department
- Location of Almirante Brown Department within Chaco Province
- Coordinates: 26°31′S 61°10′W
- Country: Argentina
- Province: Chaco
- Established: 1937-12-07
- Head town: Pampa del Infierno

Area
  - Total: 17,276 km^{2} (6,670 sq mi)

Population
  - Total: 28,096
  - Density: 1.6263/km^{2} (4.2121/sq mi)
- Demonym: brownense
- Time zone: UTC-3 (ART)
- Postal code: K3708
- Area code: 03732

Almirante Brown Department is the westernmost department of Chaco Province in Argentina.

The provincial subdivision has a population of about 28,000 inhabitants in an area of 17,276 km^{2}, and its capital city is Pampa del Infierno, which is located around 1,265 km from the Capital federal.

The department is named in honour of William Brown (1777 -1857), the Irish born commander in chief of the Argentine Navy.

== Attractions ==
The city of Pampa del Infierno hosts the annual Fiesta Provincial del Chivo (Provincial Goat Festival).

== Settlements ==
- Concepción del Bermejo
- Los Frentones
- Pampa del Infierno
- Taco Pozo
