= Haumonia =

- Municipality and village
- Interactive map of Haumonia
- Coordinates: 27°29′S 60°11′W
- Country: Argentina
- Province: Chaco Province

Population (2010)
  - Total: 77
- Time zone: UTC−3 (ART)
- Postal code: 03721

Haumonia is a village and municipality in Chaco Province in northern Argentina in the Tapengá Department. It is administratively dependent on the municipality of Charadai (the equivalent of the county seat), which is about 36 kilometers (22 miles) away.

== History ==
Haumonia was developed as a logging town connected to the company La Forestal. It came to have two railways, with one running towards Charadai and Santa Sylvina, and the other towards Villa Berthet. Both routes are no longer operational, and there was a proposal to transfer the lines to the General Manuel Belgrano Railway. Once the area's natural resources had been exhausted, La Forestal abandoned the town, which lead to a large portion of the population leaving as well.

== Population ==
Haumonia is home to 77 inhabitants (National Institute of Statistics and Census of Argentina, 2010). There was no change in the population between the 2010 census and the previous census in 2001.
