= La Paloma, Argentina =

La Paloma
- Location in Argentina
- Coordinates: 25°24′4″S 62°44′40″W
- Country: Argentina
- Province: Chaco
- Department: General Güemes
- Elevation: 226 m (741 ft)
- Time zone: UTC−3 (ART)
- Postal code: H3714

La Paloma is a city in Chaco Province, Argentina.
