= Independencia Department, Chaco =

Independencia Department
- Department
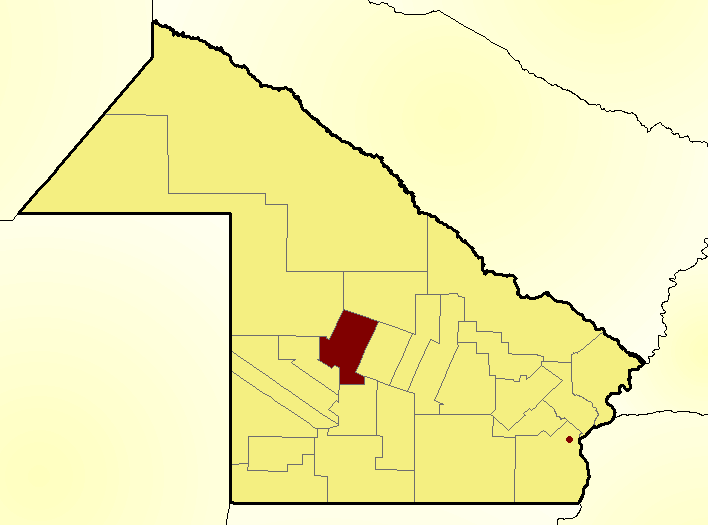
- Location of Independencia Department within Chaco Province

- Location of Independencia Department in Argentina
- Coordinates: 26°48′S 60°21′W
- Country: Argentina
- Province: Chaco Province
- Established: 1921-07-11 (Campo Largo)
- Head town: Campo Largo

Area
  - Total: 1,871 km^{2} (722 sq mi)

Population
  - Total: 20,620
  - Density: 11.02/km^{2} (28.54/sq mi)
- Demonym: Independense
- Time zone: UTC−3 (ART)
- Postal code: H3716
- Area code: 03732

Independencia is a central department of Chaco Province in Argentina.

The provincial subdivision has a population of about 20,500 inhabitants in an area of 1,871 km^{2}, and its capital city is Campo Largo, which is located around 1,229 km from the Capital federal.

== Settlements ==
- Avia Terai
- Campo Largo
- Napenay
