= El Sauzalito =

- Municipality and village
- Interactive map of El Sauzalito
- Coordinates: 24°25′42″S 61°40′59″W
- Country: Argentina
- Province: Chaco Province
- Department: General Güemes
- Founded: October 26, 1976
- Elevation: 132 m (433 ft)
- Time zone: UTC−3 (ART)

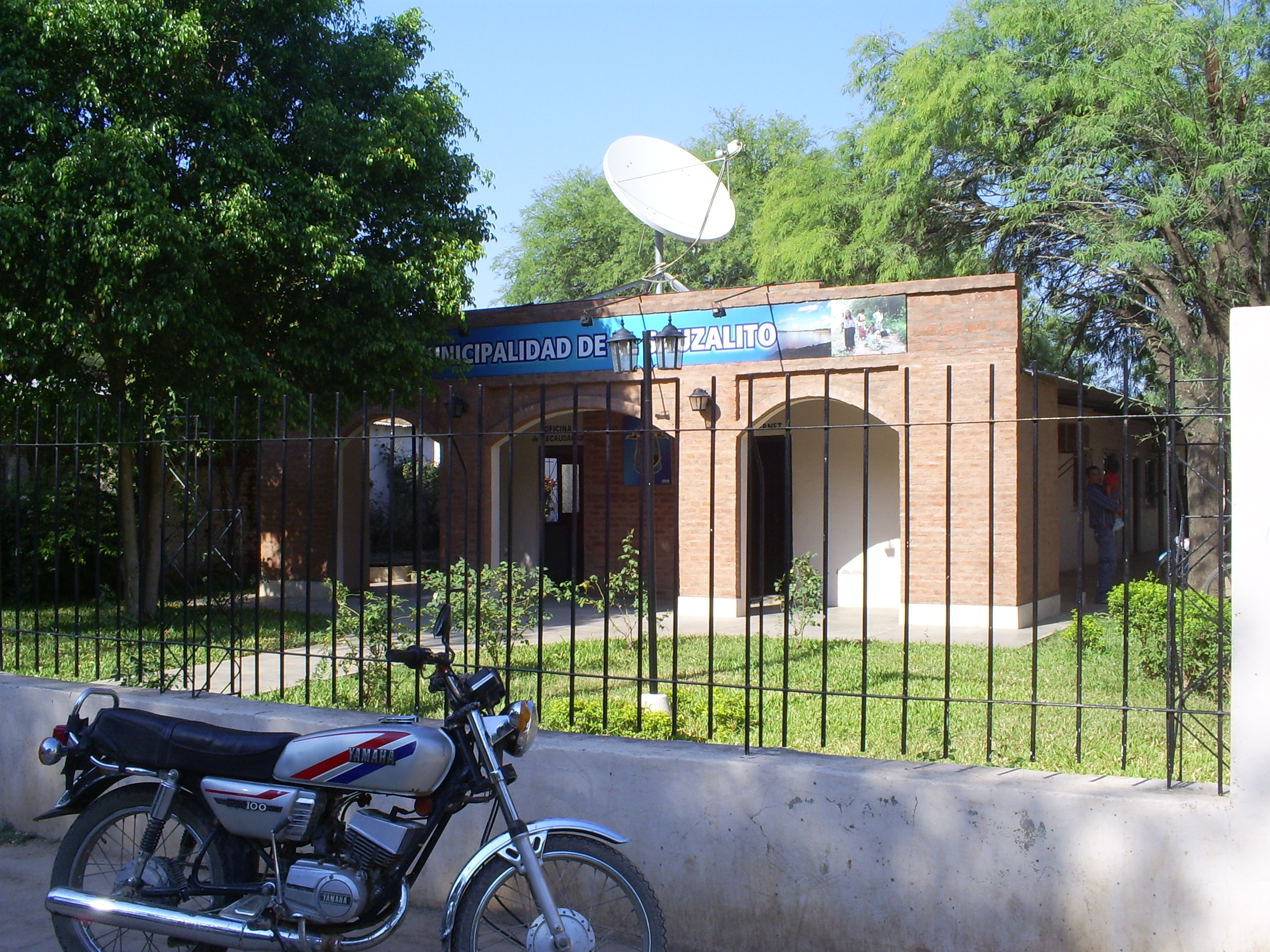
El Sauzalito

El Sauzalito is a town and municipality in Argentina, located in the northern province of Chaco, in General Guemes department . It is located on the right bank of the Teuco River and the municipality covers several nearby clusters such as El Sauzal, Wichí, Tartagal, Fortin Belgrano and Tres Pozos (where the first bridge over the river Teuco is projected). Despite having just over 2,000 inhabitants is the most populated north of Castelli, in a vast area of over 20,000 km² Chaco area.

It lies 285 km from the provincial capital Castelli, 550 km from the provincial capital .

It is inhabited by Wichí nation, original inhabitants of the place that inhabit the banks of the river Teuco, further east is the Bermejo .
