= Sargento Cabral Department =

- Department
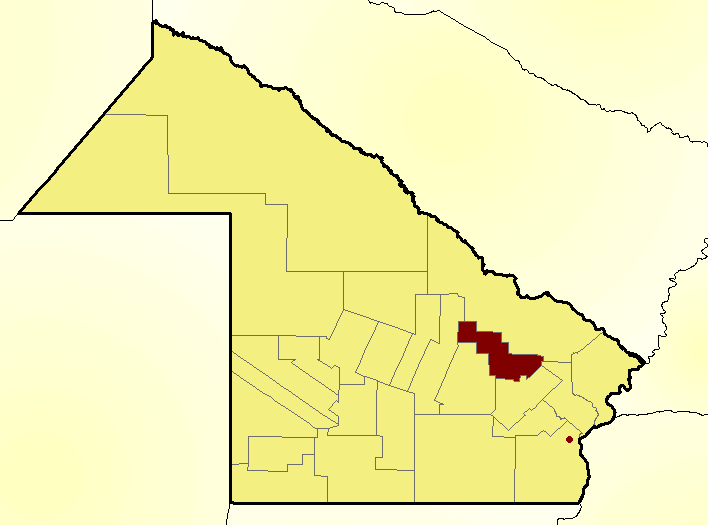
- Location of Sargento Cabral Department within Chaco Province
- Coordinates: 26°56′S 59°32′W
- Country: Argentina
- Province: Chaco Province
- Head town: Colonia Elisa

Area
  - Total: 1,651 km^{2} (637 sq mi)

Population
  - Total: 15,030
  - Density: 9.104/km^{2} (23.58/sq mi)
- Time zone: UTC-3 (ART)
- Postal code: H3515
- Area code: 03734

Sargento Cabral is a department of Chaco Province in Argentina, named after Juan Bautista Cabral (Sergeant Cabral), a soldier in the Independence Wars.

The provincial subdivision has a population of about 15,000 inhabitants in an area of 1,651 km^{2} (637 sq mi), and its capital city is Colonia Elisa, which is located about 1,100 km (680 mi) from Buenos Aires.

== Settlements ==
- Capitán Solari
- Colonia Elisa
- Colonias Unidas
- Ingeniero Barbet
- Las Garcitas
