= Villa Rural El Palmar =

- Municipality and village
- Location within Argentina
- Coordinates: 26°27′26″S 60°09′46″W
- Country: Argentina
- Province: Chaco Province
- Department: Quitilipi Department
- Founded: 1940
- Elevation: 92 m (302 ft)

Population (2010)
  - Total: 879
- Time zone: UTC−3 (ART)
- Postal code: 3530
- Area code: 03732

Villa Rural El Palmar is a village and municipality in Chaco Province in northern Argentina.
