= Veinticinco de Mayo Department =

Veinticinco de Mayo Department may refer to:

- Argentina
  - Veinticinco de Mayo Department, Chaco
  - Veinticinco de Mayo Department, Misiones
  - Veinticinco de Mayo Department, Río Negro
  - Veinticinco de Mayo Department, San Juan
