= General Güemes Department =

General Güemes Department may refer to:

- General Güemes Department, Chaco
- General Güemes Department, Salta in Salta Province
