= Libertad Department, Chaco =

Libertad Department
- Department
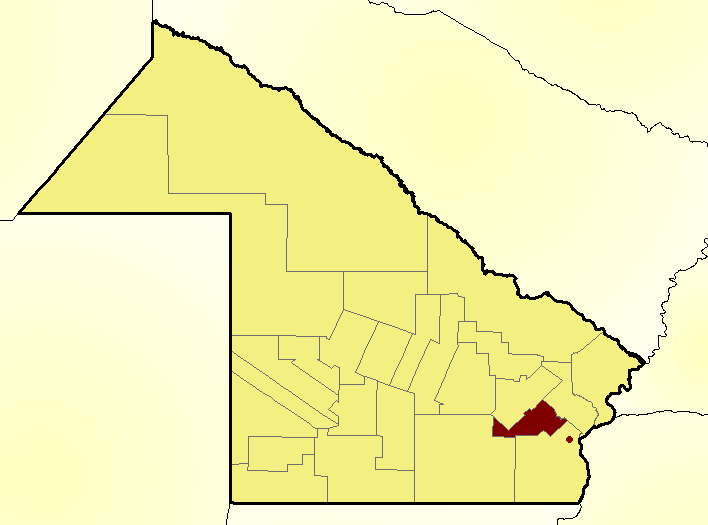
- Location of Libertad Department within Chaco Province
- Coordinates: 27°23′S 59°5′W
- Country: Argentina
- Province: Chaco Province
- Established: 1888-08-06 (Puerto Tirol)
- Head town: Puerto Tirol

Area
  - Total: 1,088 km^{2} (420 sq mi)

Population
  - Total: 10,822
  - Density: 9.947/km^{2} (25.76/sq mi)
- Demonym: Libetedense
- Time zone: UTC-3 (ART)
- Postal code: H3505
- Area code: 03722

Libertad is a department of Chaco Province in Argentina.

The provincial subdivision has a population of about 11,000 inhabitants in an area of 1,088 km^{2}, and its capital city is Puerto Tirol.

== Settlements ==
- Colonia Popular
- Fortin Cardoso
- General Obligado
- Laguna Blanca
- Puerto Tirol
