= La Leonesa =

- Town
- Location of La Leonesa in Argentina
- Coordinates: 27°03′S 58°43′W
- Country: Argentina
- Province: Chaco
- Department: Bermejo
- Elevation: 66 m (217 ft)

Population (2001)
  - Total: 10,067
- Time zone: UTC−3 (ART)
- CPA base: H3518
- Dialing code: +54 362
- Climate: Cfa

La Leonesa is a town in Chaco Province, Argentina. It is the head town of the Bermejo Department.

La Leonesa forms an urban agglomeration with the town of Las Palmas called La Leonesa-Las Palmas.
