= General Donovan Department =

- Department
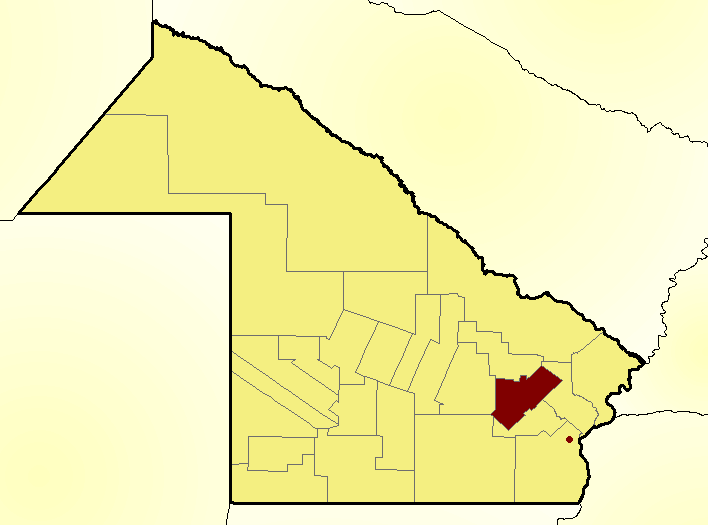
- Location of General Donovan Department within Chaco Province
- Coordinates: 27°13′S 59°17′W
- Country: Argentina
- Province: Chaco Province
- Head town: Makallé

Area
  - Total: 1,487 km^{2} (574 sq mi)

Population
  - Total: 13,385
  - Density: 9.001/km^{2} (23.31/sq mi)
- Demonym: Donovanense
- Time zone: UTC−3 (ART)
- Postal code: H3514
- Area code: 03722

General Donovan is a department of Chaco Province in Argentina, named after General Antonio Donovan.

The provincial subdivision has a population of about 13,500 inhabitants in an area of 1,487 km^{2} (574 mi^{2}), and its capital city is Makallé, which is located around 1,060 km (660 mi) from the national capital, Buenos Aires.

== Settlements ==
- La Escondida
- La Verde
- Lapachito
- Makallé
