= Miraflores, Chaco =

Coordinates: 25°38′49″S 60°55′44″W

Miraflores (Chaco)
- Municipality and village
- Interactive map of Miraflores (Chaco)
- Country: Argentina
- Province: Chaco Province
- Department: General Güemes
- Time zone: UTC−3 (ART)
- CPA base: H3705
- Area code: +54 3732

Miraflores is a village and municipality in Chaco Province in northern Argentina.
