= General Güemes Department, Chaco =

General Güemes Department
- Department
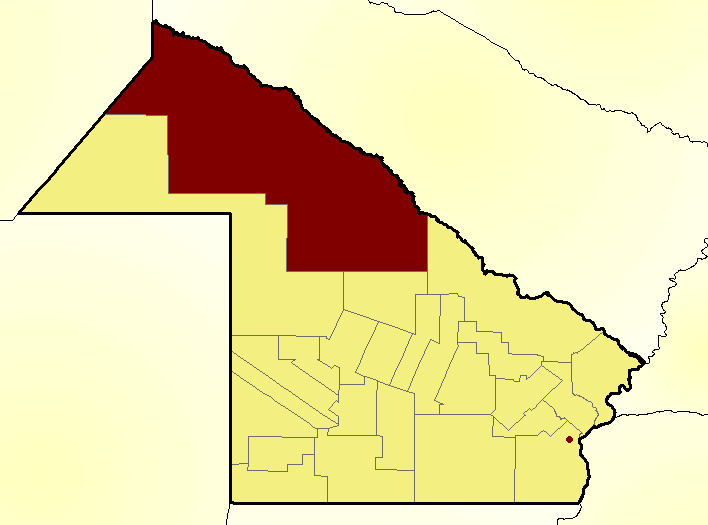
- Location of General Güemes Department within Chaco Province
- Coordinates: 25°56′S 60°37′W
- Country: Argentina
- Province: Chaco Province
- Head town: Juan José Castelli

Area
  - Total: 25,487 km^{2} (9,841 sq mi)

Population
  - Total: 62,227
  - Density: 2.4415/km^{2} (6.3235/sq mi)
- Demonym: Güemesense
- Time zone: UTC−3 (ART)
- Postal code: H3705
- Area code: 03732

General Güemes is the largest and the northernmost department of Chaco Province in Argentina.

The provincial subdivision has a population of about 62,000 inhabitants in an area of 25,487 km^{2}, and its capital city is Juan José Castelli, which is located around 1,305 km from the Capital federal.

== Settlements ==
- Castelli
- Colonia La Florida
- El Espinillo
- El Pintado
- Fortín Lavalle
- Kilometro 642
- Miraflores
- Nueva Población
- Nueva Pompeya
- Palo Marcado
- San Juancito
- Simbolar
- Tunales
- Zaparinqui
