= Santa María del Oro =

Santa María del Oro may refer to the following locations in Mexico:

- Santa María del Oro, Nayarit, a municipality and town
- Santa María del Oro, Durango, a town in the municipality of El Oro
- Santa María del Oro, Jalisco, a town and municipal seat of the homonymous municipality

== See also ==
- Fray Justo Santa María del Oro Department, Chaco Province, Argentina
