= General Donovan =

General Donovan may refer to:

- Edward Westby Donovan (1821–1897), British Army lieutenant general
- Francis L. Donovan (fl. 1980s-2020s), U.S. Marine Corps major general
- William J. Donovan (1883–1959), U.S. Army major general, wartime head of the Office of Strategic Services (OSS)
- General Donovan Department, a department of Chaco Province in Argentina named for General Antonio Donovan
