= Bermejo Department, Chaco =

Bermejo Department
- Department
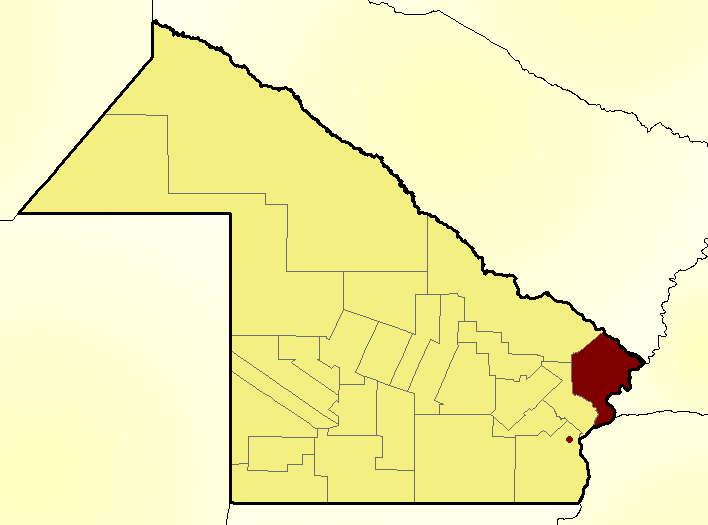
- Location of Bermejo Department within Chaco Province
- Coordinates: 27°3′S 58°43′W
- Country: Argentina
- Province: Chaco Province
- Head town: La Leonesa

Area
  - Total: 2,562 km^{2} (989 sq mi)

Population
  - Total: 24,215
  - Density: 9.452/km^{2} (24.48/sq mi)
- Demonym: bermejense
- Time zone: UTC-3 (ART)
- Postal code: H3518
- Area code: 03722

Bermejo is the easternmost department of Chaco Province in Argentina.

The provincial subdivision has a population of about 24,000 inhabitants in an area of 2,562 km², and its capital city is La Leonesa, which is located around 100 km from the provincial capital.

== Settlements ==
- General Vedia
- Isla del Cerrito
- La Leonesa
- Las Palmas
- Puerto Bermejo
- Puerto Eva Perón
