= Ingeniero Barbet =

Coordinates: 26°59′S 59°28′W

- Municipality and village
- Interactive map of Ingeniero Barbet
- Country: Argentina
- Province: Chaco Province
- Time zone: UTC−3 (ART)

Ingeniero Barbet is a village and municipality in Chaco Province in northern Argentina.
