= Corzuela =

- Town
- Location of Corzuela in Argentina
- Coordinates: 26°56′S 60°58′W
- Country: Argentina
- Province: Chaco
- Department: General Belgrano
- Elevation: 95 m (312 ft)

Population
  - Total: 10,470
- Time zone: UTC−3 (ART)
- CPA base: H3718
- Dialing code: +54 3731
- Climate: Cfa

Corzuela is a town in Chaco Province, Argentina. It is the head town of the General Belgrano Department. It was founded on April 30, 1917.
