= Selvas del Río de Oro =

Coordinates: 26°48′S 58°58′W

- Municipality and village
- Interactive map of Selvas del Río de Oro
- Country: Argentina
- Province: Chaco Province
- Time zone: UTC−3 (ART)

Selvas del Río de Oro is a village and municipality in Chaco Province in northern Argentina.
