= El Tacuruzal =

Coordinates: 26°20′22″S 60°14′35″W

- Municipality and village
- Interactive map of El Tacuruzal
- Country: Argentina
- Province: Chaco Province
- Time zone: UTC−3 (ART)

El Tacuruzal is a village and municipality in Chaco Province in northern Argentina.
