= Colonia Elisa =

- Town
- Location in Argentina
- Coordinates: 26°55′S 59°31′W
- Country: Argentina
- Province: (Chaco Province) Chaco
- Department: Sargento Cabral
- 3rd level Municipality: Colonia Elisa
- Founded: May 29, 1909
- Elevation: 59 m (194 ft)

Population ((2001 census [INDEC]))
  - Total: 4,570
- Time zone: UTC−3 (ART)
- CPA Base: H 3514
- Area code: +54 3734
- Climate: Cfa

Colonia Elisa is a town in Sargento Cabral Department, Chaco Province, Argentina.
