= Wichí – El Pintado =

Coordinates: 24°41′26″S 61°25′35″W

Wichí - El Pintado
- Municipality and village
- Interactive map of Wichí - El Pintado
- Country: Argentina
- Province: Chaco Province
- Time zone: UTC−3 (ART)

Wichí – El Pintado is a village and municipality in Chaco Province in northern Argentina.
