= Venados Grandes =

Coordinates: 27°49′S 61°23′W

- Municipality and village
- Interactive map of Venados Grandes
- Country: Argentina
- Province: Chaco Province
- Time zone: UTC−3 (ART)

Venados Grandes is a village and municipality in Chaco Province in northern Argentina.
