= Pampa Landriel =

Coordinates: 27°23′41″S 61°06′09″W

- Municipality and village
- Interactive map of Pampa Landriel
- Country: Argentina
- Province: Chaco Province
- Time zone: UTC−3 (ART)

Pampa Landriel is a village and municipality in Chaco Province in northern Argentina.
