= Zaparinqui =

Coordinates: 26°04′S 60°33′W

- Municipality and village
- Interactive map of Zaparinqui
- Country: Argentina
- Province: Chaco Province
- Time zone: UTC−3 (ART)

Zaparinqui is a village and municipality in Chaco Province in northern Argentina.
