= Puerto Lavalle =

Coordinates: 29°02′S 59°11′W

- Municipality and village
- Interactive map of Puerto Lavalle
- Country: Argentina
- Province: Chaco Province
- Time zone: UTC−3 (ART)

Puerto Lavalle is a village and municipality in Chaco Province in northern Argentina.
