= Estación General Obligado =

Coordinates: 27°24′39″S 59°25′09″W

- Municipality and village
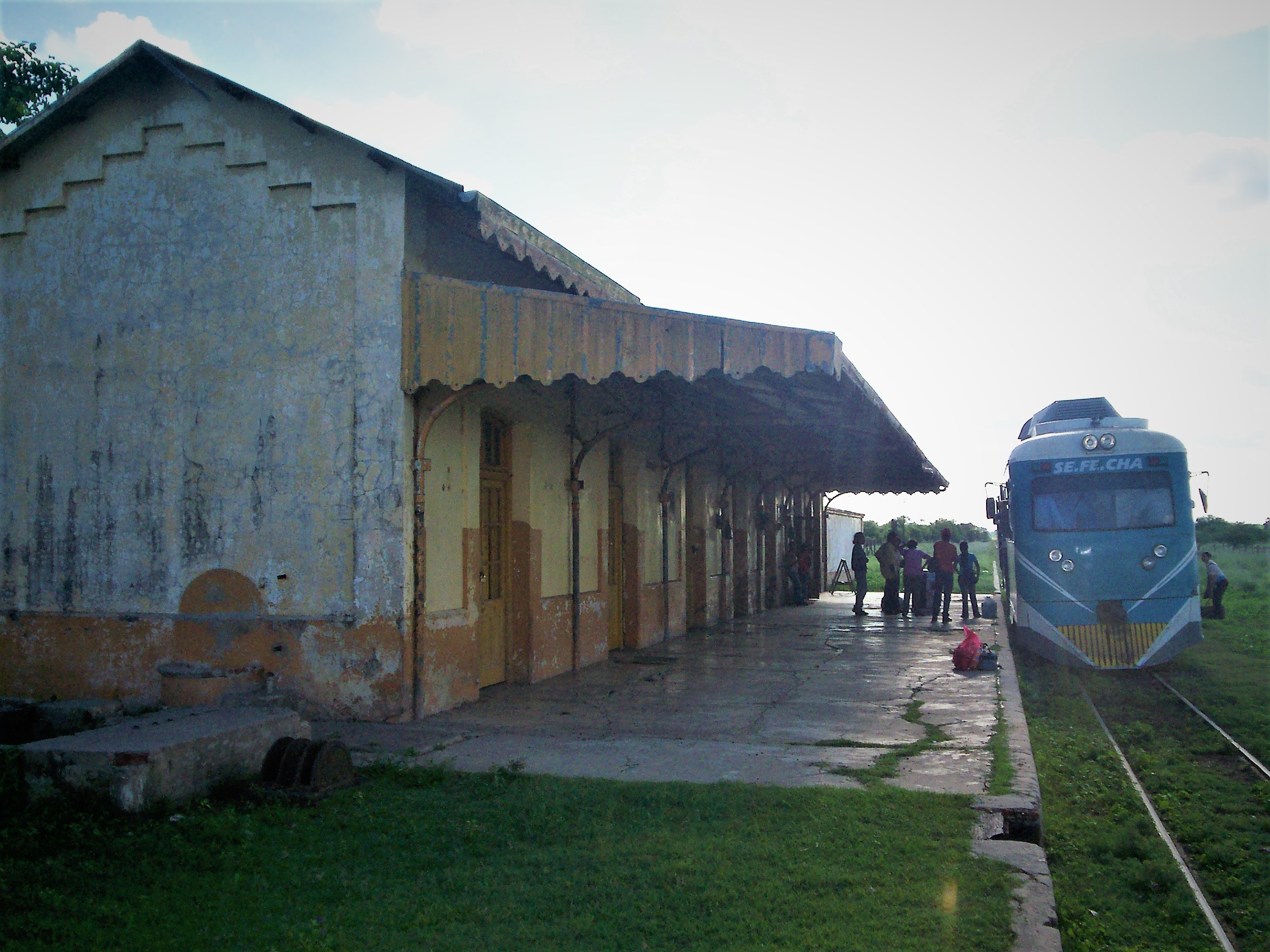
- Estación General Obligado del Ferrocarril Belgrano
- Interactive map of Estación General Obligado
- Country: Argentina
- Province: Chaco Province
- Time zone: UTC−3 (ART)

Estación General Obligado is a village and municipality in Chaco Province in northern Argentina.
