= List of Argentine provinces by Human Development Index =

Map of the HDI of the provinces of Argentina in 2021. Caption: > 0.880 0.880 – 0.850 0.850 – 0.840 0.840 – 0.830 < 0.830

The following table presents a listing of Argentina's provinces and its autonomous city, ranked in order of their Human Development Index. The last report is from 2022 and covers data from 2021. It is elaborated by the United Nations Development Programme.

== Provinces ==
Rank	Province or region	HDI (2021)
1	Buenos Aires City	0.882
2	La Pampa	0.861
3	Chubut	0.858
4	Tierra del Fuego	0.856
5	Santa Cruz	0.854
6	Mendoza	0.848
7	Catamarca	0.844
7	Río Negro	0.844
7	Salta	0.844
10	San Luis	0.843
11	Buenos Aires	0.842
11	Misiones	0.842
13	Córdoba	0.841
13	Santa Fe	0.841
13	Tucumán	0.841
16	Jujuy	0.840
16	La Rioja	0.840
18	Corrientes	0.839
19	San Juan	0.838
20	Entre Ríos	0.836
21	Santiago del Estero	0.833
22	Neuquén	0.832
23	Formosa	0.822
24	Chaco	0.808

== See also ==
- List of Argentine provinces by gross domestic product
