= General Belgrano Department, Chaco =

General Belgrano Department
- Department
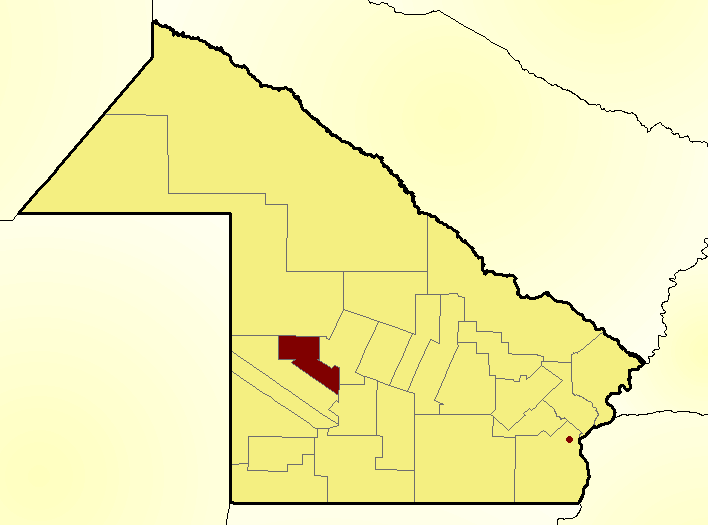
- Location of General Belgrano Department within Chaco Province
- Coordinates: 26°57′S 60°58′W
- Country: Argentina
- Province: Chaco Province
- Established: 1917-04-30
- Head town: Corzuela

Area
  - Total: 1,218 km^{2} (470 sq mi)

Population
  - Total: 10,470
  - Density: 8.596/km^{2} (22.26/sq mi)
- Demonym: Belgranense
- Time zone: UTC−3 (ART)
- Postal code: H3718
- Area code: 03731

General Belgrano is a central department of Chaco Province in Argentina.

The provincial subdivision has a population of about 10,500 inhabitants in an area of 1,218 km^{2}, and its capital city is Corzuela, which is located around 1,250 km from the Capital federal.

The department is named in honour of General Manuel Belgrano (June 3, 1770 – June 20, 1820), an Argentine economist, Lawyer, Politician and military leader.
