= Puerto Tirol =

Puerto Tirol Puerto Tirol
- Town
- Location in Argentina
- Coordinates: 27°22′S 59°04′W
- Country: Argentina
- Province: (Chaco Province) Chaco
- Department: Libertad
- 2nd level Municipality: Puerto Tirol
- Founded: August 6, 1888
- Elevation: 38 m (125 ft)

Population (2001 census [INDEC])
  - Total: 9,763
- Time zone: UTC−3 (ART)
- CPA Base: H 3505
- Area code: +54 3722
- Climate: Cfa

Puerto Tirol is a town in Chaco Province, Argentina. It is the head town of the Libertad Department.

The town was founded on August 6, 1888. The name refers to the origin of the initial settlers, who came from the Southern part of the Austro-Hungarian County of Tyrol (in German "Tirol"), an alpine region in Central Europe, today comprising Tyrol, Austria and South Tyrol, Italy.

There is another Tyrolian town in South America, about 900 km to the East, Treze Tilias, in Santa Catarina, Brazil (founded in 1933).
