= Comandancia Frías =

Coordinates: 24°33′46″S 62°14′22″W

- Municipality and village
- Interactive map of Comandancia Frías
- Country: Argentina
- Province: Chaco Province
- Time zone: UTC−3 (ART)

Comandancia Frías is a village and municipality in Chaco Province in northern Argentina.
