= Fuerte Esperanza =

Coordinates: 25°09′36″S 61°50′23″W

- Municipality and village
- Interactive map of Fuerte Esperanza
- Country: Argentina
- Province: Chaco Province
- Time zone: UTC−3 (ART)

Fuerte Esperanza is a village and municipality in Chaco Province in northern Argentina.
