= Mesón de Fierro =

Coordinates: 27°26′S 61°01′W

- Municipality and village
- Interactive map of Mesón de Fierro
- Country: Argentina
- Province: Chaco Province
- Time zone: UTC−3 (ART)

Mesón de Fierro is a village and municipality in Chaco Province in northern Argentina.
