= El Sauzal, Chaco =

Coordinates: 24°34′38″S 61°31′57″W

El Sauzal (Chaco)
- Municipality and village
- Interactive map of El Sauzal (Chaco)
- Country: Argentina
- Province: Chaco Province
- Time zone: UTC−3 (ART)

El Sauzal is a village and municipality in Chaco Province in northern Argentina.
