= La Chiquita =

Coordinates: 26°50′S 60°19′W

- Municipality and village
- Interactive map of La Chiquita
- Country: Argentina
- Province: Chaco Province
- Time zone: UTC−3 (ART)

La Chiquita is a village and municipality in Chaco Province in northern Argentina.
