= Cote Lai =

Coordinates: 27°31′37″S 59°34′22″W

- Municipality and village
- Interactive map of Cote Lai
- Country: Argentina
- Province: Chaco Province
- Time zone: UTC−3 (ART)

Cote Lai is a village and municipality in Chaco Province in northern Argentina.
