= Fray Justo Santa María de Oro Department =

- Department
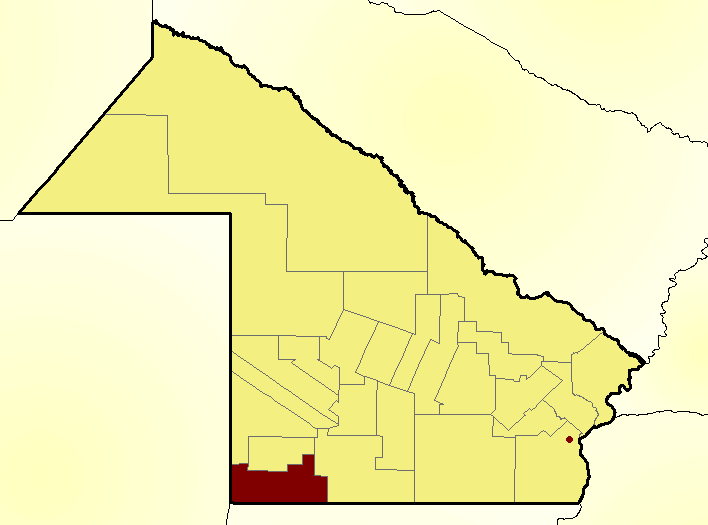
- Location of Fray Justo Santa María de Oro Department within Chaco Province
- Coordinates: 27°49′S 61°9′W
- Country: Argentina
- Province: Chaco Province
- Head town: Santa Sylvina

Area
  - Total: 2,205 km^{2} (851 sq mi)

Population
  - Total: 10,485
  - Density: 4.755/km^{2} (12.32/sq mi)
- Demonym: Santasylvinense
- Time zone: UTC-3 (ART)
- Postal code: H3541
- Area code: 03735

Fray Justo Santa María de Oro is the most south western department of Chaco Province in Argentina.

The provincial subdivision has a population of about 10,500 inhabitants in an area of 2,205 km², and its capital city is Santa Sylvina, which is located around 1,000 km from the Capital federal.

It takes its name from Justo de Santa María de Oro.

== Settlements ==
- Cabeza del Tigre
- Chorotis
- Santa Sylvina
- Tres Mojones
- Venados Grandes
- Zuberbuhler
