= List of Argentine regions by GDP =

This article includes a list of Argentine provinces by gross regional product, the value of all final goods and services produced within a nation in a given year, and other main indicators. The rows in this table can be sorted by clicking on the arrows at the top of any column.

== Provinces ==
District	Population	GDP (bil. US$) 2023 a	GDP per capita (US$) 2023 a	Agri- culture b	Mining b	Manufac turing b	Services & cons truction b	Exports (mil. US$) 2011	Mean monthly salary 2017 (Pesos) a,e	Vehicles (per 1000) d	Income poverty f
Buenos Aires Province	17,431,446	230.5	15,839								
City of Buenos Aires	3,093,735	120.6	23,335								
Córdoba	3,800,000	47.5	12,500								
Santa Fe	3,560,000	44.7	12,600	10.1	0.0	17.4	72.5	17804	24,289 ($US1,466)	299	25.5
Mendoza	2,010,000	27.2	13,500	5.4	6.1	17.5	71.0	1862	20,951 ($US1,265)	313	21.7
Tucumán	1,730,000	19.6	11,300	6.0	0.1	12.6	81.3	1031	18,829 ($US1,137)	146	32.6
Chaco	1,220,000	16.5	13,500	12.6	0.0	7.5	79.9	602	19,702 ($US1,190)	137	36.4
Entre Ríos	1,400,000	16.1	11,500	11.9	0.3	11.6	76.2	1908	20,585 ($US1,243)	280	30.0
Salta	1,450,000	14.8	10,200	8.1	7.6	10.4	73.9	1332	19,863 ($US1,199)	139	30.7
Misiones	1,270,000	14.6	11,500	6.7	0.0	13.0	80.3	536	18,127 ($US1,094)	153	37.7
Corrientes	1,140,000	13.0	11,500	12.6	0.0	8.2	79.2	230	19,158 ($US1,157)	168	N/A
Santiago del Estero	990,000	11.2	11,300	11.5	0.1	6.2	82.2	1082	17,648 ($US1,066)	103	32.8
Río Negro	760,000	10.4	13,800	4.9	8.4	7.3	79.4	670	24,896 ($US1,503)	285	21.2
San Juan	790,000	9.5	12,000	8.1	0.3	15.9	75.7	2470	21,438 ($US1,294)	216	25.0
Neuquén	680,000	9.4	13,800	0.7	42.8	2.9	53.6	353	39,475 ($US2,383)	339	23.4
Jujuy	780,000	8.0	10,200	5.5	0.7	14.6	79.2	456	20,702 ($US1,250)	153	33.2
Chubut	630,000	7.2	11,500	6.9	21.3	10.0	61.8	3148	40,417 ($US2,440)	400	21.4
San Luis	520,000	7.0	13,500	4.9	0.5	42.4	52.2	735	24,170 ($US1,459)	245	19.0
Formosa	610,000	5.7	9,300	7.6	1.5	6.4	84.5	40	20,590 ($US1,243)	107	35.1
Santa Cruz	380,000	5.2	13,800	4.4	47.1	2.3	46.2	1857	47,480 ($US2,867)	432	11.6
Catamarca	420,000	5.0	12,000	3.6	20.8	12.1	63.5	1596	21,412 ($US1,293)	162	34.6
La Pampa	360,000	4.9	13,500	19.0	3.7	5.3	72.0	378	22,834 ($US1,379)	364	21.1
La Rioja	400,000	4.8	12,000	3.9	0.1	16.8	79.2	281	19,035 ($US1,149)	172	30.2
Tierra del Fuego	180,000	2.5	13,800	4.7	18.5	18.6	58.2	443	42,384 ($US2,559)	478	12.7
Argentina	45,780,000	655.9	12,700	5.0	2.7	16.3	76.0	83950^{c}	26,233 ($US1,584)	284	25.5

== Notes ==
- a) GDP in constant (2015) market exchange rate dollar
- b) Sectorial data from CEPAL (2000).
- c) Includes USD5.9 billion not specified by province.
- d) Excludes 427,000 motor vehicles (3.9%) not specified by province. Included in national total.
- e) 2017 data; includes employees registered with Social Security Administration only.
- f) 2014 data; official figures lower due to understated CPI index.
- g) 2001 Census.

== See also ==
- List of Argentine provinces by Human Development Index
