= Las Palmas, Chaco =

Coordinates: 27°04′S 58°42′W

Las Palmas (Chaco)
- Municipality and village
- Interactive map of Las Palmas (Chaco)
- Country: Argentina
- Province: Chaco
- Department: Bermejo

Population (2001)
  - Total: 6,593
- Time zone: UTC−3 (ART)

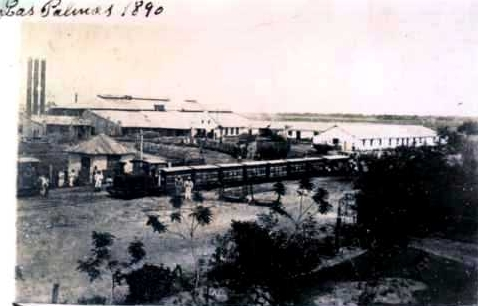
Las Palmas

Las Palmas is a village and municipality in Chaco Province in northern Argentina.
