= Tres Pozos =

Coordinates: 24°18′31″S 61°54′05″W

- Municipality and village
- Interactive map of Tres Pozos
- Country: Argentina
- Province: Chaco Province
- Time zone: UTC−3 (ART)

Tres Pozos is a village and municipality in Chaco Province in northern Argentina. Tres Pozos is the place chosen to project a fourth bridge between the provinces of Chaco and Formosa .
