= La Liguria =

Coordinates: 27°28′43″S 58°57′11″W

- Municipality and village
- Interactive map of La Liguria
- Country: Argentina
- Province: Chaco Province
- Time zone: UTC−3 (ART)

La Liguria is a village and municipality in Chaco Province in northern Argentina.
