= Pueblo Clodomiro Díaz =

Coordinates: 27°37′01″S 60°48′41″W

- Municipality and village
- Interactive map of Pueblo Clodomiro Díaz
- Country: Argentina
- Province: Chaco Province
- Time zone: UTC−3 (ART)

Pueblo Clodomiro Díaz is a village and municipality in Chaco Province in northern Argentina.
