= Los Frentones =

Coordinates: 26°25′S 61°25′W

- Municipality and village
- Interactive map of Los Frentones
- Country: Argentina
- Province: Chaco Province
- Time zone: UTC−3 (ART)

Los Frentones is a village and municipality in Chaco Province in northern Argentina.
