= Nueve de Julio Department, Chaco =

Nueve de Julio Department
- Department
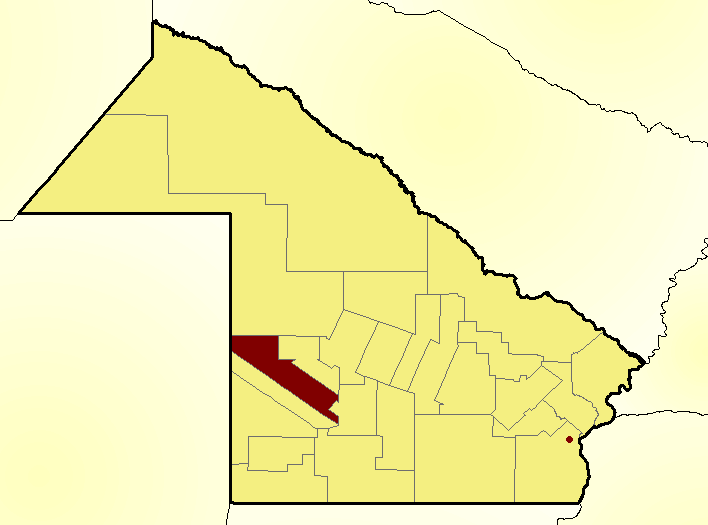
- Location of Nueve de Julio Department within Chaco Province
- Coordinates: 27°5′S 61°5′W
- Country: Argentina
- Province: Chaco Province
- Head town: Las Breñas

Area
  - Total: 2,097 km^{2} (810 sq mi)

Population
  - Total: 26,955
  - Density: 12.85/km^{2} (33.29/sq mi)
- Demonym: Breñasense
- Time zone: UTC-3 (ART)
- Postal code: H3722
- Area code: 03731

Nueve de Julio is a department of Chaco Province in Argentina.

The provincial subdivision has a population of about 27,000 inhabitants in an area of 1,130 km^{2}, and its capital city is Las Breñas, which is located around 1,130 km from the Capital federal.

== Settlements ==
- Colonia Santa Elena
- El Puca
- Las Breñas
- Pampa del Cielo
- Pampa San Martin
- Pampa Sommer
- Pozo del Indio
