= Pampa Mangrullo =

Coordinates: 26°10′S 61°10′W

- Municipality and village
- Interactive map of Pampa Mangrullo
- Country: Argentina
- Province: Chaco Province
- Time zone: UTC−3 (ART)

Pampa Mangrullo is a village and municipality in Chaco Province in northern Argentina.
