= Pampa del Infierno =

- Town
- Location of Pampa del Infierno in Argentina
- Coordinates: 26°31′S 61°10′W
- Country: Argentina
- Province: Chaco
- Department: Almirante Brown
- Elevation: 111 m (364 ft)

Population
  - Total: 8,176
- Time zone: UTC−3 (ART)
- CPA base: H3708
- Dialing code: +54 3732
- Climate: Cfa

Pampa del Infierno is a town in Chaco Province, Argentina. It is the head town of the Almirante Brown Department. The town was founded on December 7, 1927.

In May, Pampa del Infierno hosts the annual goat festival ("Fiesta Provincial del Chivo").

MSU Argentina's solar park, the largest in Chaco Province, was built along National Route No. 16, in Pampa del Infierno. It covers an area of 320 hectares, features 223,000 solar panels, and, since 2024, provides energy to around 300,000 homes.
