= Villa Jalón =

Coordinates: 27°20′48″S 59°05′25″W

- Municipality and village
- Interactive map of Villa Jalón
- Country: Argentina
- Province: Chaco Province
- Time zone: UTC−3 (ART)

Villa Jalón is a village in Chaco Province in northern Argentina.
