= Colonia Popular =

Coordinates: 27°17′S 59°09′W

- Municipality and village
- Interactive map of Colonia Popular
- Country: Argentina
- Province: Chaco Province
- Time zone: UTC−3 (ART)

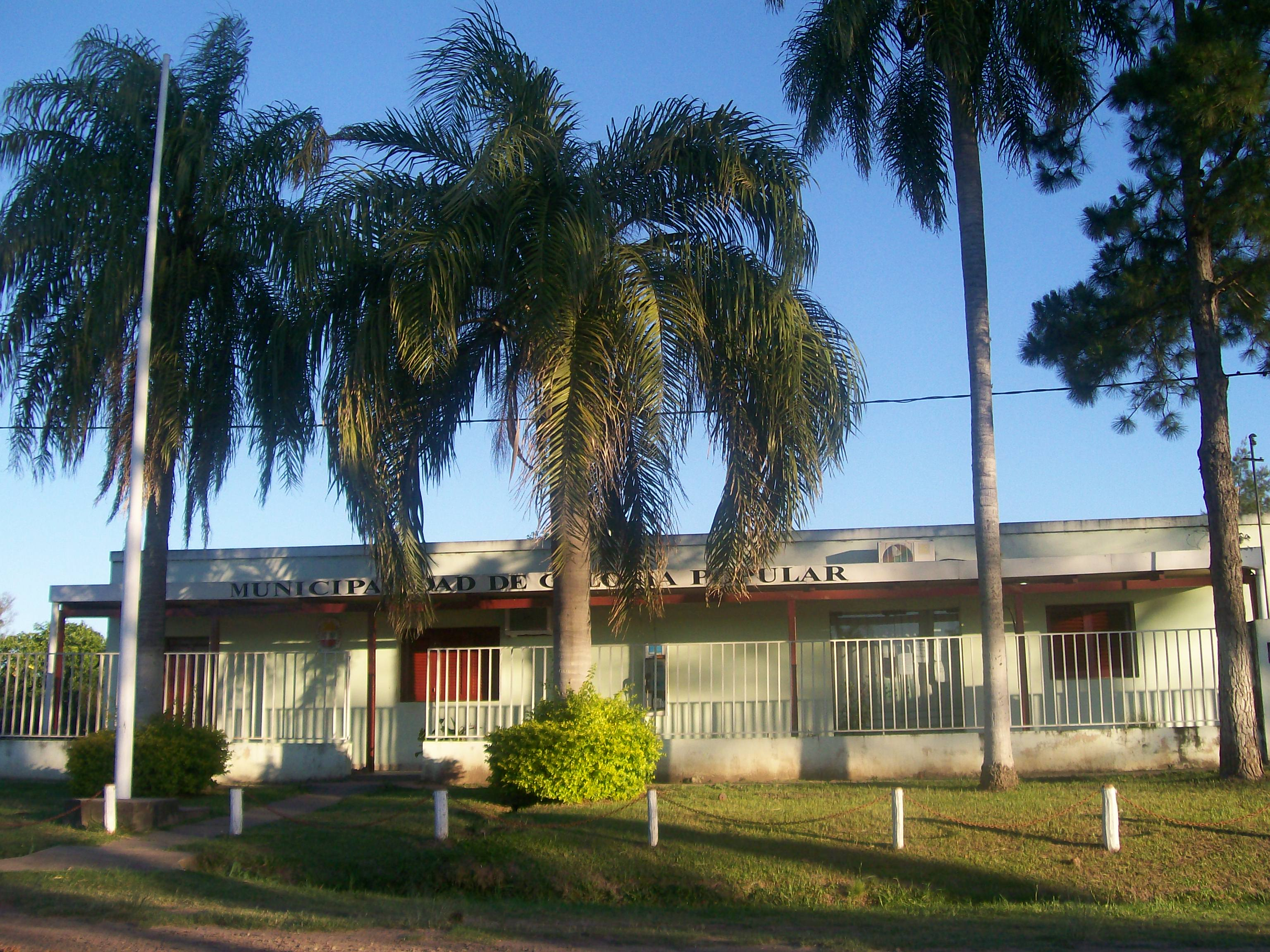
Colonia Popular

Colonia Popular is a village and municipality in Chaco Province in northern Argentina.
