= Comandante Fernández Department =

- Department
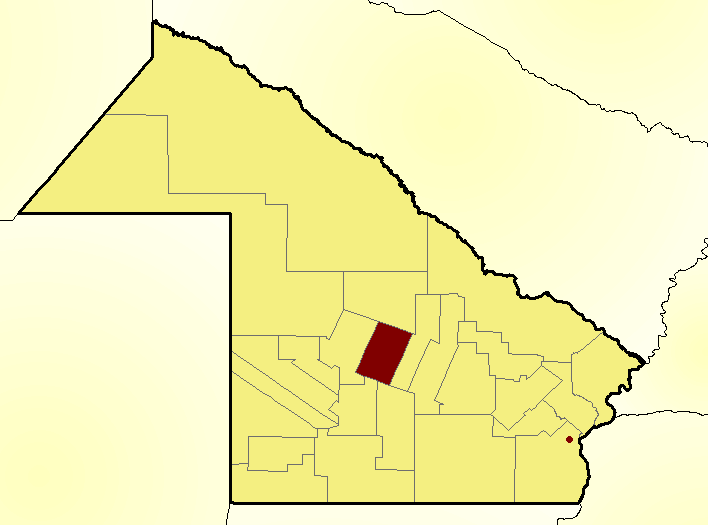
- Location of Comandante Fernández Department within Chaco Province
- Coordinates: 26°48′S 60°27′W
- Country: Argentina
- Province: Chaco Province
- Head town: Presidencia Roque Sáenz Peña

Area
  - Total: 1,500 km^{2} (580 sq mi)

Population
  - Total: 88,164
  - Density: 59/km^{2} (150/sq mi)
- Demonym: Saenzpeñense
- Time zone: UTC-3 (ART)
- Postal code: H3700
- Area code: 03732

Comandante Fernández Department is a central department of Chaco Province in Argentina.

The provincial subdivision has a population of about 88,000 inhabitants in an area of 1,500 km², and its capital city is Presidencia Roque Sáenz Peña, which is located around 1,120 km from the Capital federal.
