= Doce de Octubre Department =

- Department
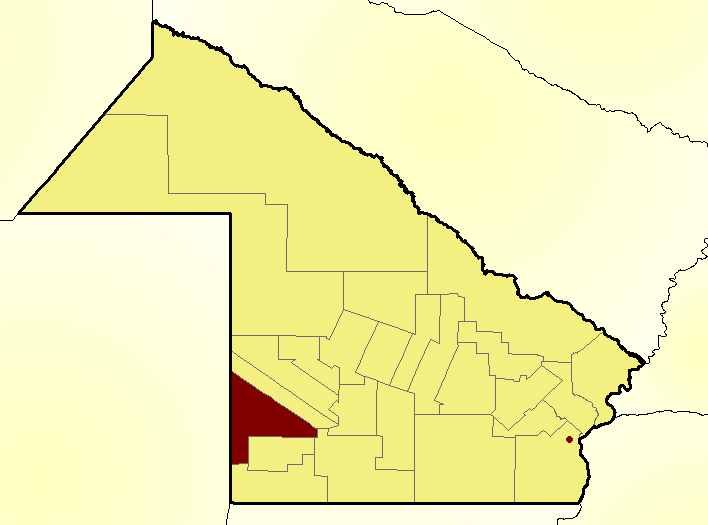
- Location of Doce de Octubre Department within Chaco Province
- Coordinates: 27°19′S 61°15′W
- Country: Argentina
- Province: Chaco Province
- Established: 1912-05-25
- Head town: General Pinedo

Area
  - Total: 2,576 km^{2} (995 sq mi)

Population
  - Total: 20,149
  - Density: 7.822/km^{2} (20.26/sq mi)
- Demonym: Pinedense
- Time zone: UTC-3 (ART)
- Postal code: H3732
- Area code: 03731

12 de Octubre is a western department of Chaco Province in Argentina.

The provincial subdivision has a population of about 20,000 inhabitants in an area of 2,576 km^{2}, and its capital city is General Pinedo, which is located around 1,060 km from the Capital federal.

== Settlements ==
- Gancedo
- General Capdevila
- General Pinedo
