= Las Breñas =

- City
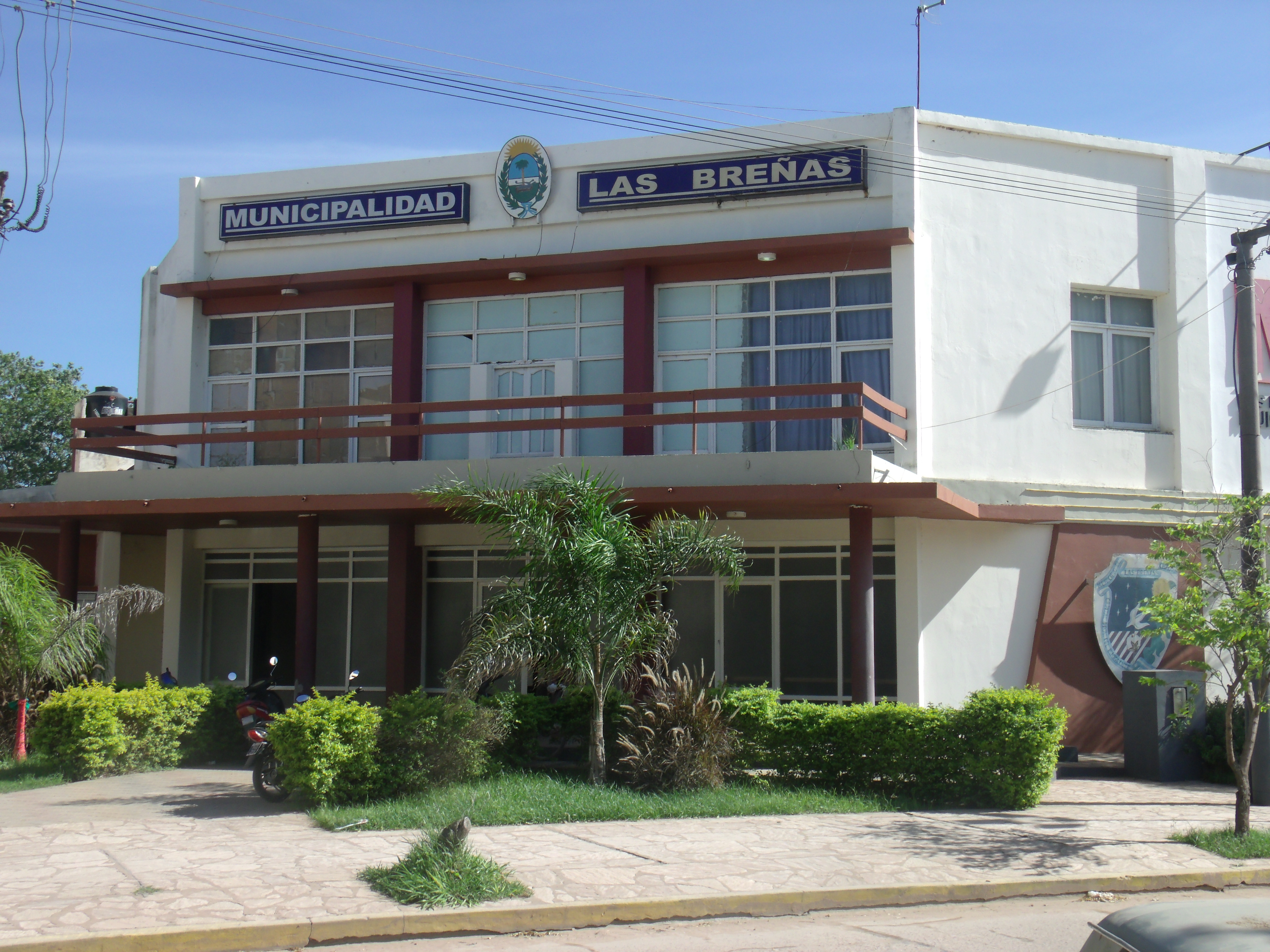

- Location in Argentina
- Coordinates: 27°04′S 61°04′W
- Country: Argentina
- Province: (Chaco Province) Chaco
- Department: Nueve de Julio
- 1st level Municipality: Las Breñas
- Elevation: 104 m (341 ft)

Population ((2010 census [INDEC]))
  - Total: 22,953
- Time zone: UTC−3 (ART)
- CPA Base: H 3722
- Area code: +54 3731

Las Breñas is a city in Chaco Province, Argentina. It is the head town of the Nueve de Julio Department.

The economy of Las Breñas is centrad around agriculture and farming. It is home to an Instituto Nacional de Tecnología Agropecuaria facility.

== Climate ==
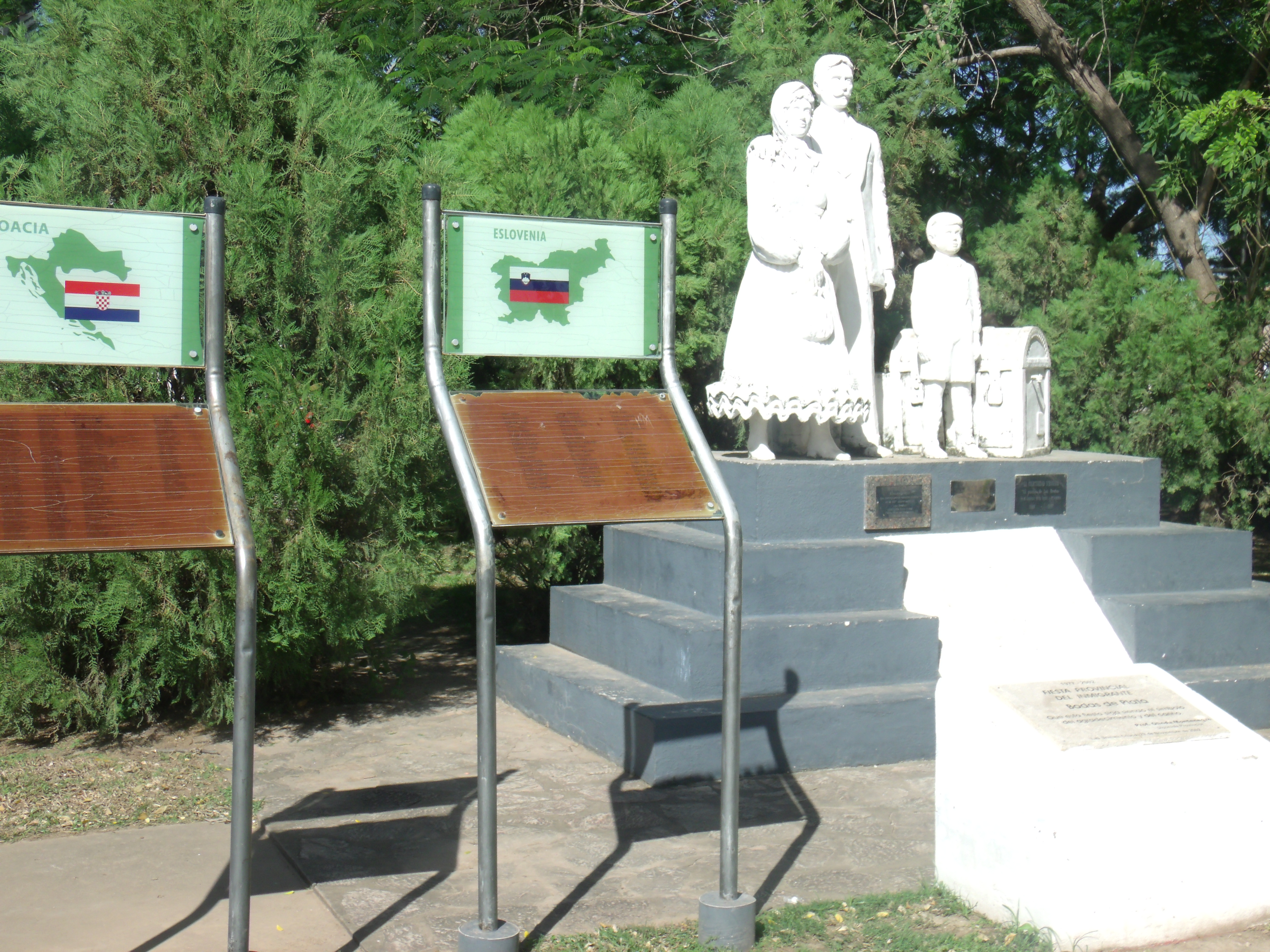
Monument to European immigration in Sarmiento Square in Las Breñas.

The climate of Las Breñas is classified as subtropical with dry winters, which under the Köppen climate classification would be classified as a humid subtropical climate (Cwa). The yearly average maximum temperature is 28.1 °C (82.6 °F) while the yearly average minimum temperature is 14.9 °C (58.8 °F) with a yearly mean of 21.1 °C (70.0 °F). Summers are characterized by very high temperatures; the highest temperature recorded was 44.8 °C (112.6 °F) on December 10, 1970. In contrast winters are mild with cool nights and temperatures can be very low with the lowest temperature recorded being −7.5 °C (18.5 °F) on July 20, 1957. With the average first and last dates of frost being May 31 and September 3 respectively, Las Breñas has a frost free period of 256 days although frosts as early as April 15 and as late as October 6 has occurred.

The average annual precipitation is 946.0 millimetres (37 in) with most of the precipitation occurring during the warmer months. From May to September, which are the cooler months, they are dry, with these 5 months only registering 14% of the total annual precipitation. However, annual precipitation from year to year is highly variable, ranging from a low of 513.5 millimetres (20 in) in 2008 to a high of 1,550.1 millimetres (61 in) in 1986.

Climate data for Las Breñas, Chaco (extremes 1938–present)
Month	Jan	Feb	Mar	Apr	May	Jun	Jul	Aug	Sep	Oct	Nov	Dec	Year
Record high °C (°F)	43.5 (110.3)	43.3 (109.9)	41.6 (106.9)	39.5 (103.1)	36.5 (97.7)	33.0 (91.4)	36.5 (97.7)	40.5 (104.9)	42.7 (108.9)	44.1 (111.4)	44.5 (112.1)	44.8 (112.6)	44.8 (112.6)
Mean daily maximum °C (°F)	33.9 (93.0)	32.5 (90.5)	30.5 (86.9)	26.8 (80.2)	24.3 (75.7)	21.3 (70.3)	22.0 (71.6)	24.6 (76.3)	26.7 (80.1)	29.4 (84.9)	31.1 (88.0)	33.2 (91.8)	28.1 (82.6)
Daily mean °C (°F)	27.0 (80.6)	25.8 (78.4)	24.1 (75.4)	20.2 (68.4)	17.6 (63.7)	14.9 (58.8)	14.7 (58.5)	16.5 (61.7)	19.0 (66.2)	22.2 (72.0)	24.1 (75.4)	26.1 (79.0)	21.1 (70.0)
Mean daily minimum °C (°F)	20.4 (68.7)	19.9 (67.8)	18.5 (65.3)	15.2 (59.4)	12.2 (54.0)	9.7 (49.5)	8.7 (47.7)	9.6 (49.3)	12.1 (53.8)	15.3 (59.5)	17.3 (63.1)	19.4 (66.9)	14.9 (58.8)
Record low °C (°F)	4.1 (39.4)	8.5 (47.3)	3.5 (38.3)	−0.1 (31.8)	−6.1 (21.0)	−6.6 (20.1)	−7.5 (18.5)	−6.5 (20.3)	−4.0 (24.8)	−0.8 (30.6)	5.0 (41.0)	6.2 (43.2)	−7.5 (18.5)
Average precipitation mm (inches)	138.1 (5.44)	129.3 (5.09)	128.0 (5.04)	105.7 (4.16)	37.5 (1.48)	23.7 (0.93)	17.2 (0.68)	17.1 (0.67)	36.0 (1.42)	79.6 (3.13)	113.7 (4.48)	119.6 (4.71)	946.0 (37.24)
Average relative humidity (%)	62	67	70	74	74	73	67	60	56	58	60	60	65
Mean monthly sunshine hours	285.2	240.1	229.4	192.0	189.1	150.0	186.0	213.9	207.0	244.9	267.0	288.3	2,692.9
Percentage possible sunshine	68	65	60	55	56	48	56	62	58	62	67	68	61
Source: Instituto Nacional de Tecnología Agropecuaria

== Notable people ==
- Ante Garmaz (1928–2011), actor, fashion designer, television presenter and model
