= La Leonesa, Chaco =

La Leonesa (Chaco)
- Municipality and village
- Interactive map of La Leonesa (Chaco)
- Coordinates: 27°02′19″S 58°42′18″W
- Country: Argentina
- Province: Chaco Province
- Time zone: UTC−3 (ART)

La Leonesa is a village and municipality in Chaco Province in northern Argentina.
