= Presidencia de la Plaza Department =

- Department
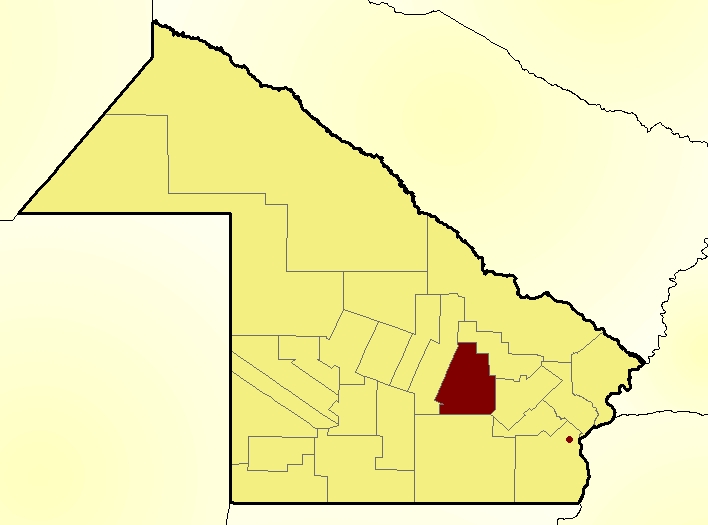
- Location of Presidencia de la Plaza Department within Chaco Province
- Coordinates: 27°1′S 59°51′W
- Country: Argentina
- Province: Chaco Province
- Head town: Presidencia de la Plaza

Area
  - Total: 2,284 km^{2} (882 sq mi)

Population
  - Total: 12,231
  - Density: 5.355/km^{2} (13.87/sq mi)
- Time zone: UTC-3 (ART)
- Postal code: H3536
- Area code: 03734

Presidencia de la Plaza is a department of Chaco Province in Argentina.

The provincial subdivision has a population of about 12,000 inhabitants in an area of 2,284 km^{2}, and its capital city is Presidencia de la Plaza, which is located around 1,120 km from the Capital federal.

== Settlements ==
- Fortin Aguilar
- Paso de Oso
- Presidencia de la Plaza

== Attractions ==
The Parque Nacional Chaco (Chaco National Park) is partially situated in the Presidencia de la Plaza Department. The park consists of woodland, rivers and lakes. Native Fauna include Tapirs, Monkeys, Armadillos and Viscachas.
