= Fortín Las Chuñas =

Coordinates: 26°53′08″S 60°54′29″W

- Municipality and village
- Interactive map of Fortín Las Chuñas
- Country: Argentina
- Province: Chaco Province
- Time zone: UTC−3 (ART)

Fortín Las Chuñas is a village and municipality in Chaco Province in northern Argentina.
