= Quitilipi =

- City
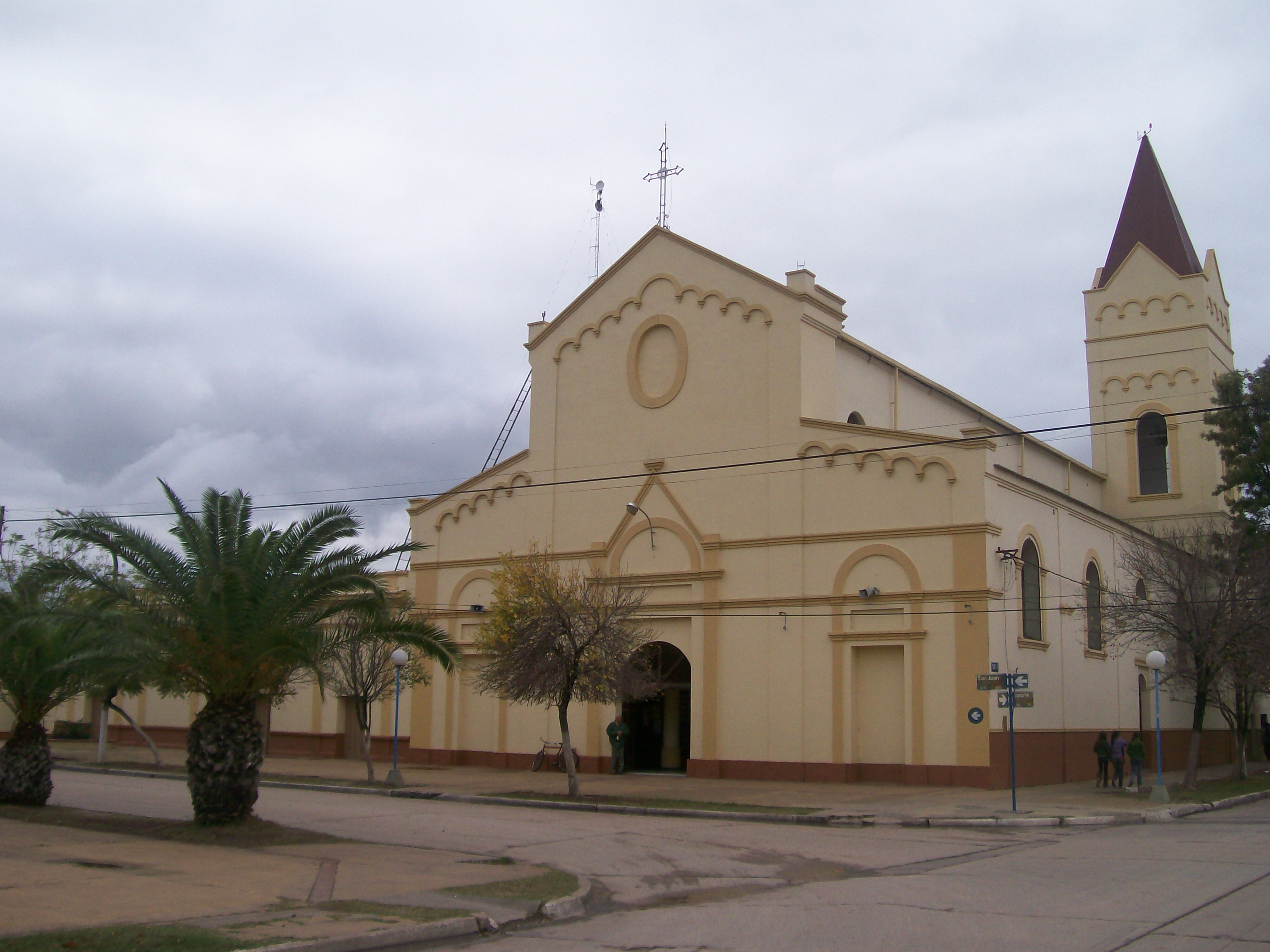
- Parish Church in Quitilipi

- Location in Argentina
- Coordinates: 26°52′S 60°13′W
- Country: Argentina
- Province: (Chaco Province) Chaco
- Department: Quitilipi
- 1st level Municipality: Quitilipi
- Founded: November 30, 1912
- Elevation: 81 m (266 ft)

Population (2010 census)
  - Total: 32 083
- Time zone: UTC−3 (ART)
- CPA Base: H 3530
- Area code: +54 3732
- Climate: Cfa

Quitilipi is a city in Chaco Province, Argentina. It is the head town of the Quitilipi Department.

== See also ==
- Vilela language, spoken in the city in the 1970s
