= Samuhú, Chaco =

Samuhú (Chaco)
- Municipality and village
- Location of Samuhú in Argentina
- Coordinates: 27°31′09″S 60°23′36″W
- Country: Argentina
- Province: Chaco Province
- Time zone: UTC−3 (ART)

Samuhú (Spanish pronunciation: [samuˈu]) is a village and municipality in Chaco Province in northern Argentina.
