= Paraje San Fernando, Chaco =

Coordinates: 27°26′04″S 59°00′27″W

Paraje San Fernando (Chaco)
- Municipality and village
- Interactive map of Paraje San Fernando (Chaco)
- Country: Argentina
- Province: Chaco Province
- Time zone: UTC−3 (ART)

Paraje San Fernando is a village and municipality in Chaco Province in northern Argentina.
