= Makallé =

- Town
- Location of Makallé in Argentina
- Coordinates: 27°12′S 59°17′W
- Country: Argentina
- Province: Chaco
- Department: General Donovan
- Elevation: 55 m (180 ft)

Population
  - Total: 3,812
- Time zone: UTC−3 (ART)
- CPA base: H3514
- Dialing code: +54 3722
- Climate: Cfa

Makallé is a town in Chaco Province, Argentina. It is the head town of the General Donovan Department.

The town is named after a battle at Mekelle during the Italian invasion of Abyssinia in the 19th century.

== History ==
The Argentine government established a line of fortresses in Lapachito, Ciervo Petiso y Makallé during the Conquest of Chaco campaign, intended to occupy the indigenous areas in the north-east of Argentina. These fortresses formed the basis of future settlement in the region. By the 1890s the indigenous people had given up the area and it was settled by Italian immigrants amongst others.
