= Presidencia de la Plaza =

- Town
- Location in Argentina
- Coordinates: 26°59′S 59°50′W
- Country: Argentina
- Province: (Chaco Province) Chaco
- Department: Presidencia de la Plaza
- 2nd level Municipality: Presidencia de la Plaza
- Founded: 1921 (Official)
- Elevation: 81 m (266 ft)

Population ((2001 census [INDEC]))
  - Total: 12,231
- Time zone: UTC−3 (ART)
- CPA Base: H 3536
- Area code: +54 3734
- Climate: Cfa

Presidencia de la Plaza or simply Plaza, is a town in Chaco Province, Argentina. It is the head town of the Presidencia de la Plaza Department.

The area was first settled in 1911 and was officially founded in 1921 and named in honour of the former President Victorino de la Plaza.

In 2005, the Instituto Nacional de Tecnología Agropecuaria opened a station in the town.
