= Juan José Castelli, Chaco =

Juan José Castelli
- Town
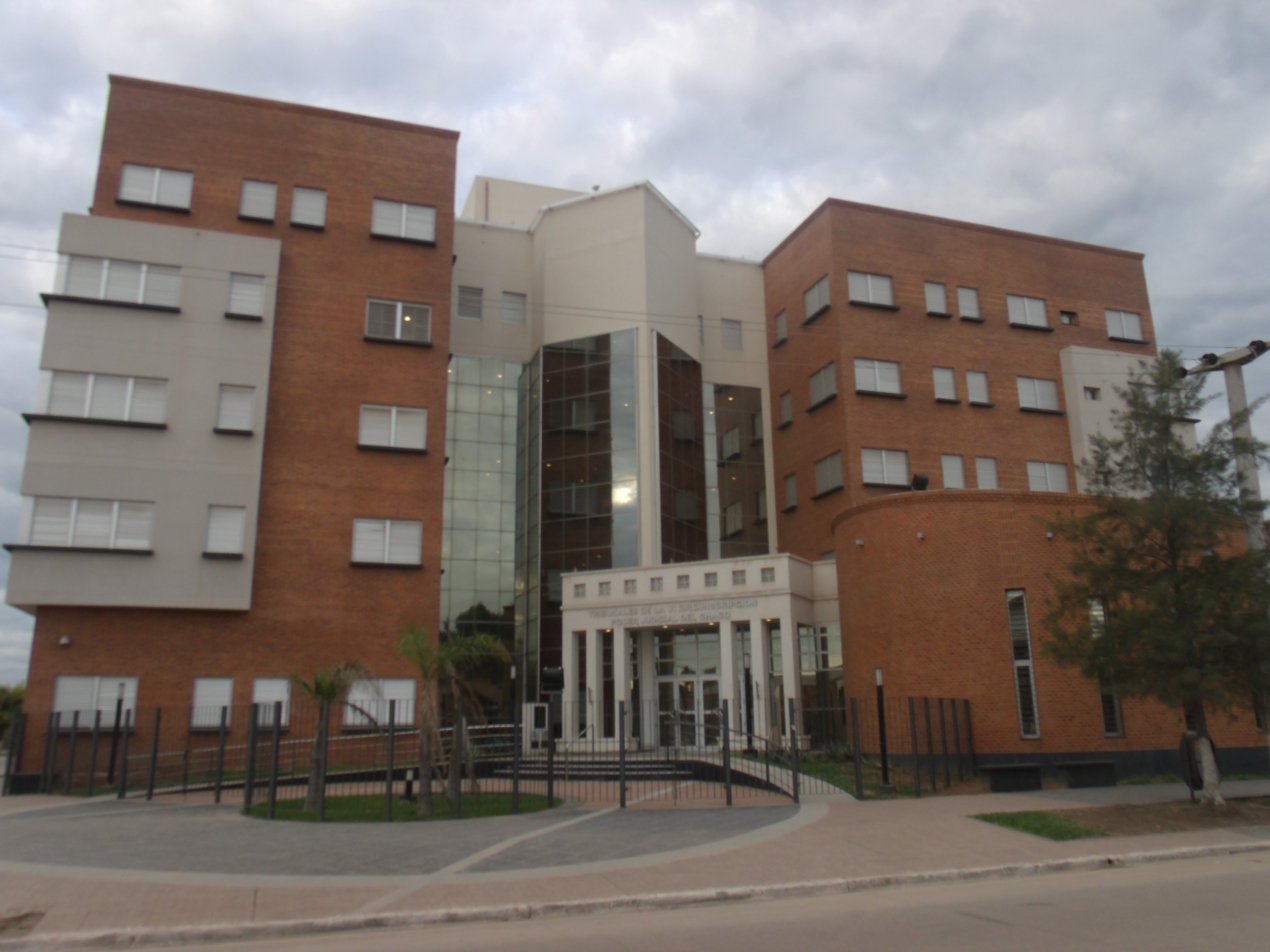

- Location of Juan José Castelli in Argentina
- Coordinates: 25°57′S 60°37′W
- Country: Argentina
- Province: Chaco
- Department: General Güemes

Population (2010 census)
  - Total: 27,201
- Time zone: UTC−3 (ART)
- CPA base: H3705
- Dialing code: +54 3732

Juan José Castelli (usually abbreviated to Castelli) is a town in the province of Chaco, Argentina. It is located 274 km from the provincial capital Resistencia and has about 27,000 inhabitants as per the 2010 census [INDEC]. It is the head town of the General Güemes Department. Its population is mainly of Volga German descent.

The area was originally populated by aboriginals of the Toba and Wichí tribes. Around 1910 a group of colonists from Salta, who had followed the course of the Bermejo River, established there. After the end of World War I, and especially due to the 1923 campaign encouraging the development of cotton crops in Chaco, European immigrants started to come. In 1928 Castelli was founded as an agricultural colony, 100 km north of Presidencia Roque Sáenz Peña.

In June 1931, 320 Volga German families arrived, even carrying furniture, tools and livestock. They were around 2,300 who had been settled in La Pampa and the west of Buenos Aires, but were forced to move by bad harvests and economic problems. Cotton cultivation was at the time promoted as a source of wealth. Besides the Volga German majority, immigrants from Poland, Romania, Spain, Paraguay, Hungary, Czechoslovakia, Italy, Yugoslavia and Ukraine also came.

On 17 June 1936 the settlement was linked to Presidencia Roque Sáenz Peña by a railroad. This major achievement sparked the foundation of the town as such, locally acknowledged on 3 October (though the official date was that of the National Decree of 2 February 1938).

The town greatly suffered the consequences of the blockade effected by the Allies during World War II, since Germany was one of the largest importers of cotton produced in the area, and that prevented shipments. After 1941, however, international prices of cotton increased and from then on Castelli progressed. A delegation of the Nación Bank was opened in the city in 1952, and the Güemes Hospital was built in 1956.

As of the 21st century, the city has several cooperatives in the fields of agriculture, promotion of electric power supply in rural areas, beekeeping, sustainable forest exploitation, fruit cultivation, etc. There are also a gaucho traditionalist association and a Volga German community association, as well as several sports clubs.
