= Puerto Eva Perón =

Coordinates: 26°39′48″S 58°37′05″W

- Municipality and village
- Interactive map of Puerto Eva Perón
- Country: Argentina
- Province: Chaco
- Department: Bermejo

Population (2001)
  - Total: 586
- Time zone: UTC−3 (ART)

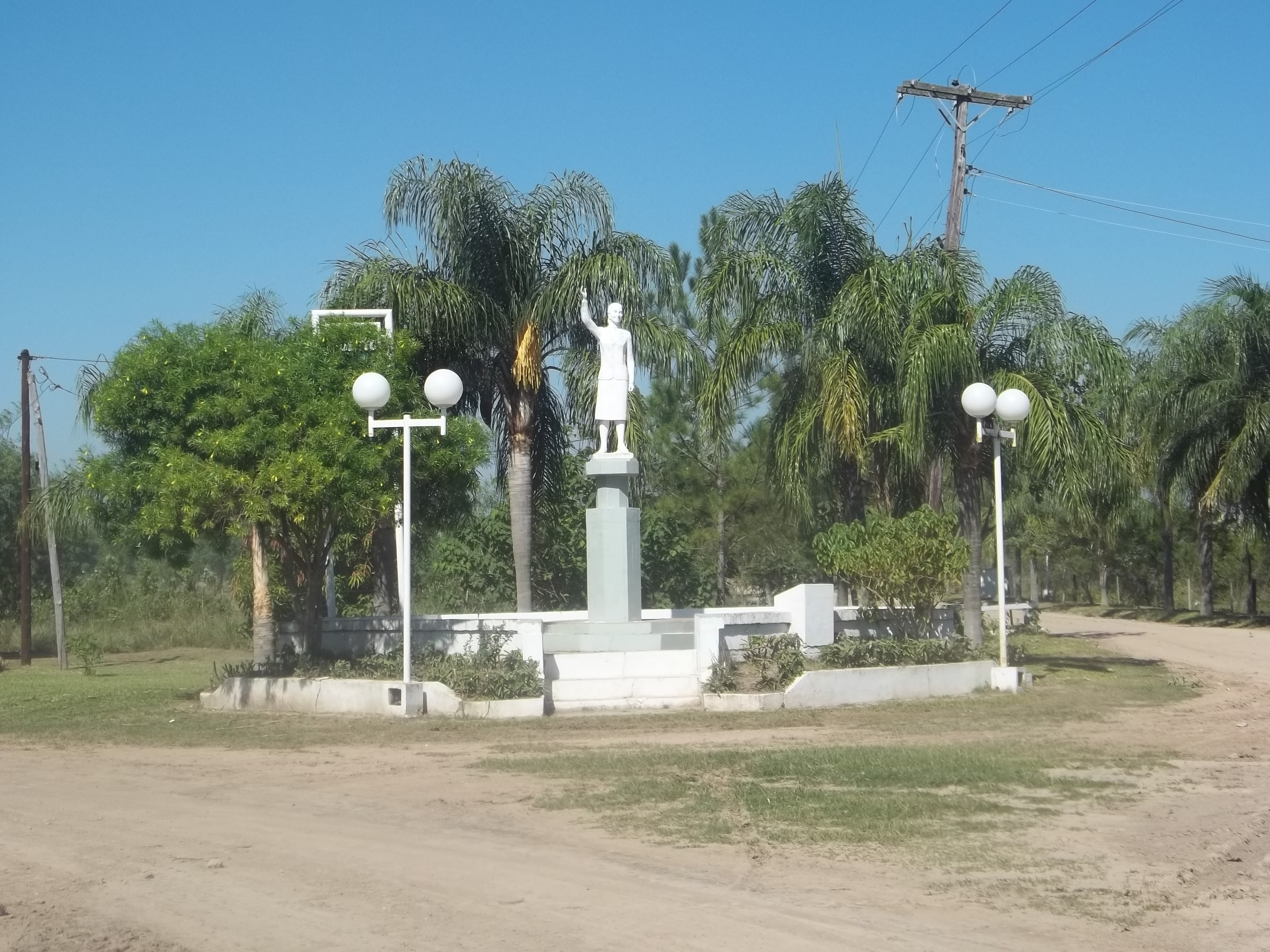
Puerto Eva Perón, Chaco

Puerto Eva Perón is a village and municipality in Chaco Province in northern Argentina. It is named after the former Argentine First Lady Eva Perón.
