= General Pinedo, Chaco =

General Pinedo
- Town
- Location of General Pinedo in Argentina
- Coordinates: 27°19′S 61°17′W
- Country: Argentina
- Province: Chaco
- Department: 12 de Octubre

Population
  - Total: 15,741
- Time zone: UTC−3 (ART)
- CPA base: H3732
- Dialing code: +54 3731
- Climate: Cwa

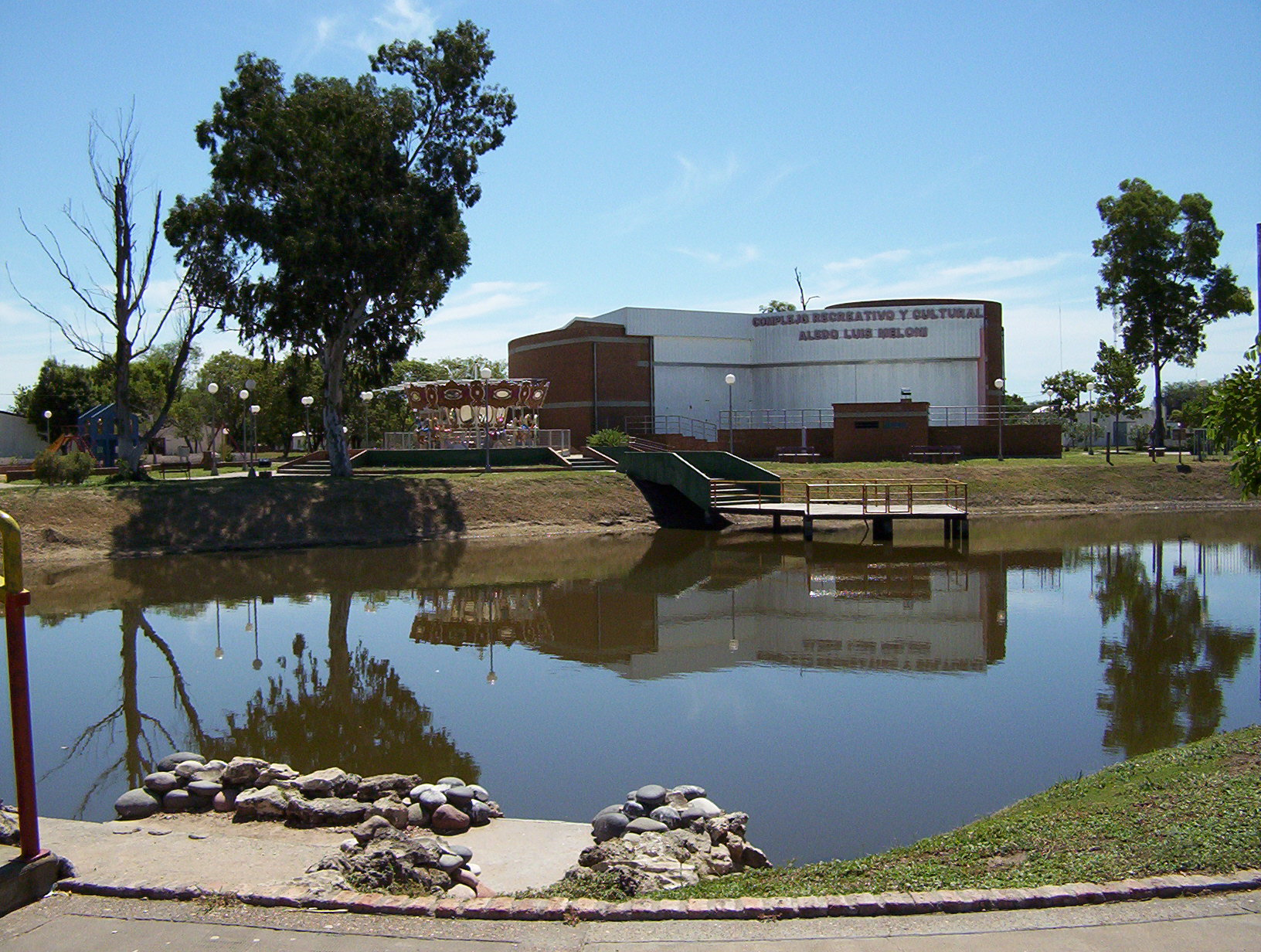
Complejo Aledo Meloni in General Pinedo, Chaco

General Pinedo is a town in the south of the province of Chaco, Argentina. It has about 16,000 inhabitants as per the 2001 census [INDEC], and is the head town of the 12 de Octubre Department.
