= Machagai =

- City
- Location in Argentina
- Coordinates: 26°55′S 60°02′W
- Country: Argentina
- Province: (Chaco Province) Chaco
- Department: Veinticinco de Mayo
- 1st level Municipality: Machagai
- Elevation: 83 m (272 ft)

Population (2010 census)
  - Total: 21,997
- Time zone: UTC−3 (ART)
- CPA Base: H 3534
- Area code: +54 3734
- Climate: Cfa

Machagai (Spanish pronunciation: [matʃaˈɣaj]) is a city in Chaco Province, Argentina. It is the head town of the Veinticinco de Mayo Department.

== History ==
Native Argentines like the Qom people used to wander through the area, giving the place its name. After the end of the Argentine Civil War, the government turned its attention to scarcely populated regions of the country like Patagonia and Chaco and started to promote the arrival of immigrants to populate and strengthen them. The province of Chaco was one of the most transformed by this wave of immigration. In 1909 the first Montenegrin immigrants escape from their now-occupied country by the Austro-Hungarian Empire. They came to Machagai and founded their agricultural colonies, in 1921 by State decree it was promoted to the category of town. Until the mid-20th century, Machagai continued to receive immigrants from Yugoslavia and Spain.
