= Concepción del Bermejo =

Coordinates: 26°36′S 60°57′W

Concepción del Bermejo (Chaco)
- Municipality and village
- Interactive map of Concepción del Bermejo (Chaco)
- Country: Argentina
- Province: Chaco
- Time zone: UTC−3 (ART)

Concepción del Bermejo is a village and municipality in Chaco Province in northern Argentina.
