= Colonia Aborigen El Pastoril =

Coordinates: 27°37′35″S 60°44′54″W

- Municipality and village
- Interactive map of Colonia Aborigen El Pastoril
- Country: Argentina
- Province: Chaco Province
- Time zone: UTC−3 (ART)

Colonia Aborigen El Pastoril is a village and municipality in Chaco Province in northern Argentina.
