= Campo Largo, Chaco =

Campo Largo
- Town
- Location in Argentina
- Coordinates: 26°48′S 60°50′W
- Country: Argemtoma
- Province: Chaco
- Department: Independencia
- 2nd level Municipality: Campo Largo
- Elevation: 104 m (341 ft)

Population (2001 census [INDEC])
  - Total: 10,743
- Time zone: UTC−3 (ART)
- CPA Base: H 3716
- Area code: +54 3732

Campo Largo is a town in the province of Chaco, Argentina, and the capital of the department of Independencia. It is located 197 km (122 mi) west-north-west of Resistencia. The population in 2001 was 10,743.
