= Lapachito =

Coordinates: 27°10′S 59°24′W

- Municipality and village
- Interactive map of Lapachito
- Country: Argentina
- Province: Chaco Province
- Time zone: UTC−3 (ART)

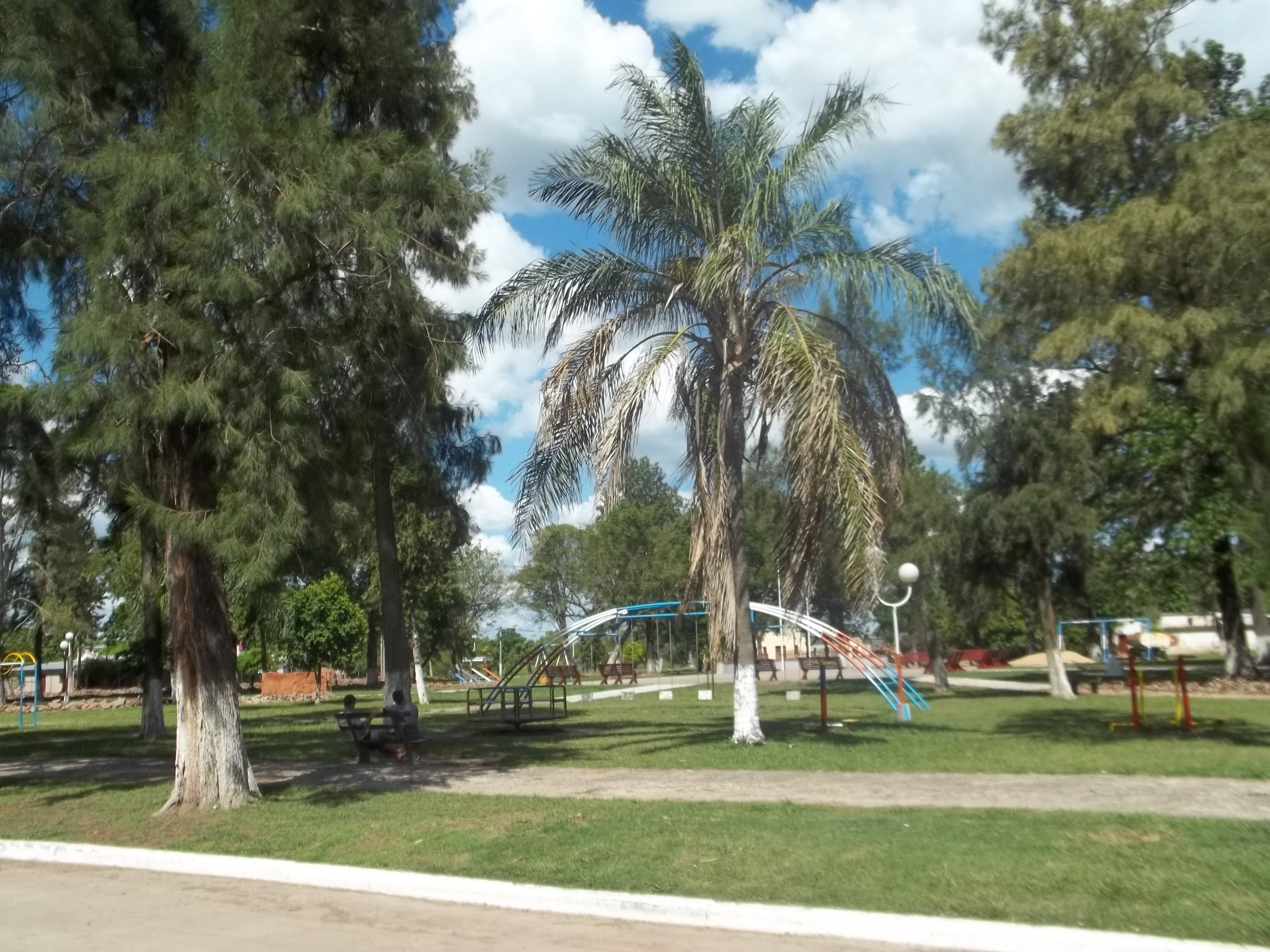
Lapachito

Lapachito is a village and municipality in Chaco Province in northern Argentina.
