= Fortín Belgrano =

Coordinates: 24°07′23″S 62°20′16″W

- Municipality and village
- Interactive map of Fortín Belgrano
- Country: Argentina
- Province: Chaco Province
- Time zone: UTC−3 (ART)

Fortín Belgrano is a village and municipality in Chaco Province in northern Argentina.
