= General Vedia =

Coordinates: 26°56′S 58°40′W

- Municipality and village
- Interactive map of General Vedia
- Country: Argentina
- Province: Chaco Province

Government
  - Intendente: Jorge Rodriguez

Population (2001)
  - Total: 3,513
- Time zone: UTC−3 (ART)

General Vedia is a village and municipality in Chaco Province in northern Argentina. This village is also known as "La cuna del escudo chaqueño" whose translation is "The Cradle of the Chaqueños shield"
