= La Escondida, Chaco =

Coordinates: 27°06′14″S 59°26′43″W

La Escondida (Chaco)
- Municipality and village
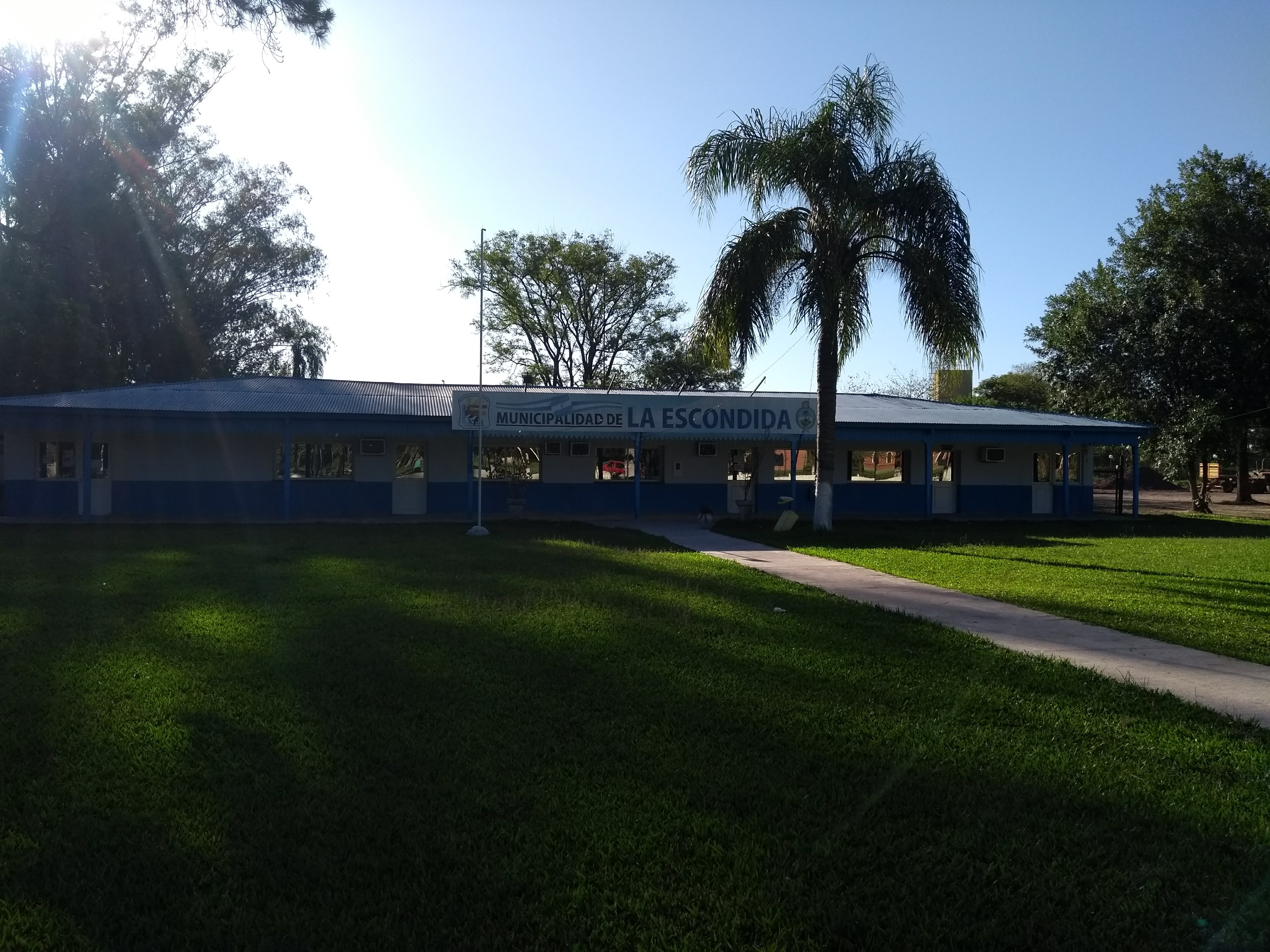
- Town hall of La Escondida
- Interactive map of La Escondida (Chaco)
- Country: Argentina
- Province: Chaco Province
- Time zone: UTC−3 (ART)

La Escondida is a village and municipality in Chaco Province in northern Argentina La Escondida in the region of Chaco with its 3,948 residents is located in Argentina - some 522 miles (840 km) north of Buenos Aires.

== History ==
The modern settlement of the area had its beginnings in the first decade of the twentieth century, when Carlos Nöettinger and Roberto and Emilio Lepetit decided to settle in what was then a colony to raise livestock and forestry and to devote themselves to the extraction of tannins. The construction of their factory and the development of the village of La Escondida took place at the same time. The village was founded on the basis of a tannin factory, which built housing for its workers when it was established. The factory was connected to the railway station by a 2 kilometres (1.2 mi) long metre-gauge industrial railway. It is one of the two tannin factories still in operation today in Chaco.

The town of La Escondida was founded on 29 September 1927. It was initially called Desvío Kilómetro 917, due to the kilometre of the nearby railway line, until 1934, when it was officially named after the well-known La Escondida lagoon. It was architecturally conceived as a garden city that incorporated the new European ideas of the time about the design and construction of cities. However, the development plan was not approved until 1951, when the government authorised the construction of streets, squares and public buildings. The city stood out structurally and scenically from the other cities designed in the style of industrial town planning of the time, and still retains such pleasing and unique aspects as the planting of various species of trees in the streets.

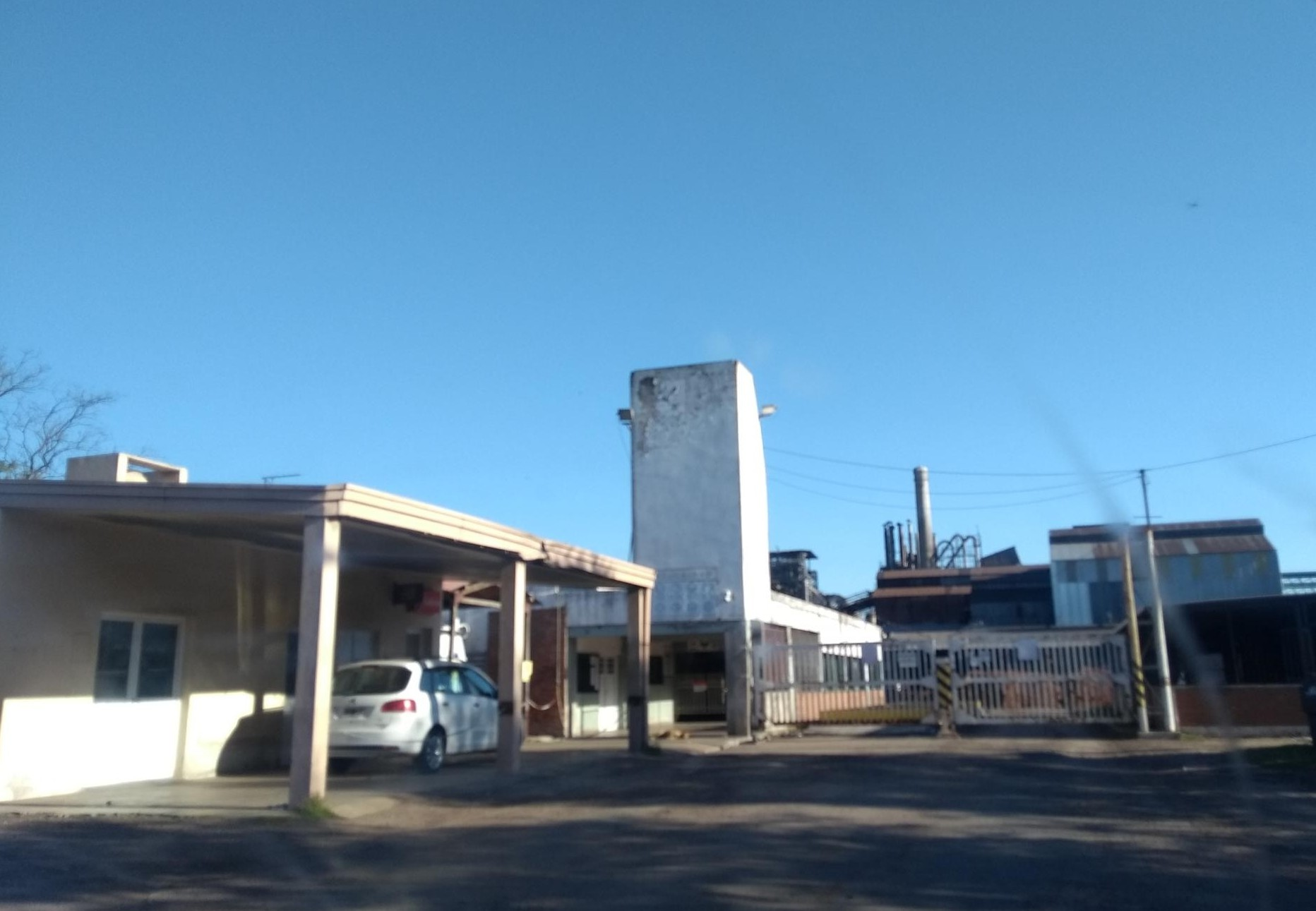
Indunor tannin factory in La Escondida

On 1 July 1968, the tanneries La Chaqueña S. A. from Villa Ángela merged with Nöetinger Lepetit S.A. from La Escondida, and the new company was renamed Indunor S.A.. This company continued the industrial and commercial activities of these two companies. The reactivation of Indunor, which was founded in 1914 as Nöetinger Lepetit S.A., changed the mood and appearance of La Escondida, stopping the exodus to other urban centres and lowering poverty indicators. The revival of tannin production mobilised other sectors, such as forestry, and revitalised the city.

True to its tradition as an agro-industrial city, it grew with the development of the tannin industry in the province and today still hosts a significant and modern industrial plant that continues to produce quebracho extract with state-of-the-art technology and a whole range of different derivative products that are marketed both nationally and internationally.
