= Tapenagá Department =

- Department
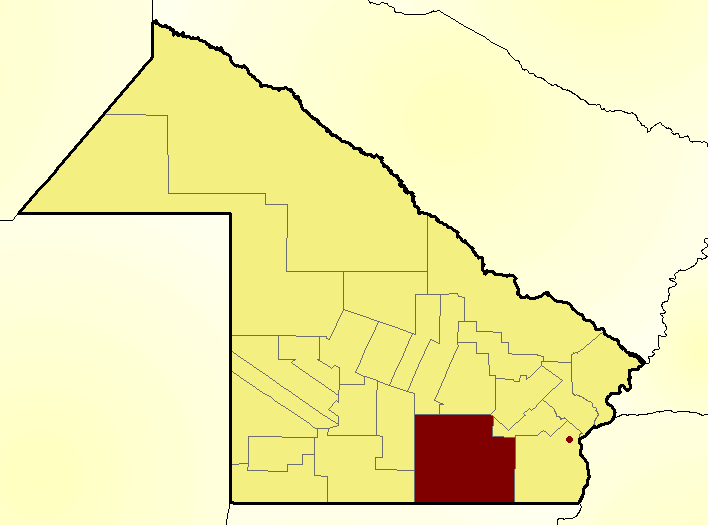
- Location of Tapenagá Department within Chaco Province
- Coordinates: 27°38′S 59°54′W
- Country: Argentina
- Province: Chaco Province
- Established: 1905 (Charadai)
- Head town: Charadai

Area
  - Total: 6,025 km^{2} (2,326 sq mi)

Population
  - Total: 4,188
  - Density: 0.6951/km^{2} (1.800/sq mi)
- Demonym: Tapenagense
- Time zone: UTC-3 (ART)
- Postal code: H3513
- Area code: 03721

Tapenagá is a southern department of Chaco Province in Argentina.

The provincial subdivision has a population of about 4,000 inhabitants in an area of 6,025km², and its capital city is Charadai, which is located around 1,070 km from the Capital federal.

== Settlements ==
- Oetling
