= Taco Pozo =

Coordinates: 25°36′54″S 63°15′54″W

- Municipality and village
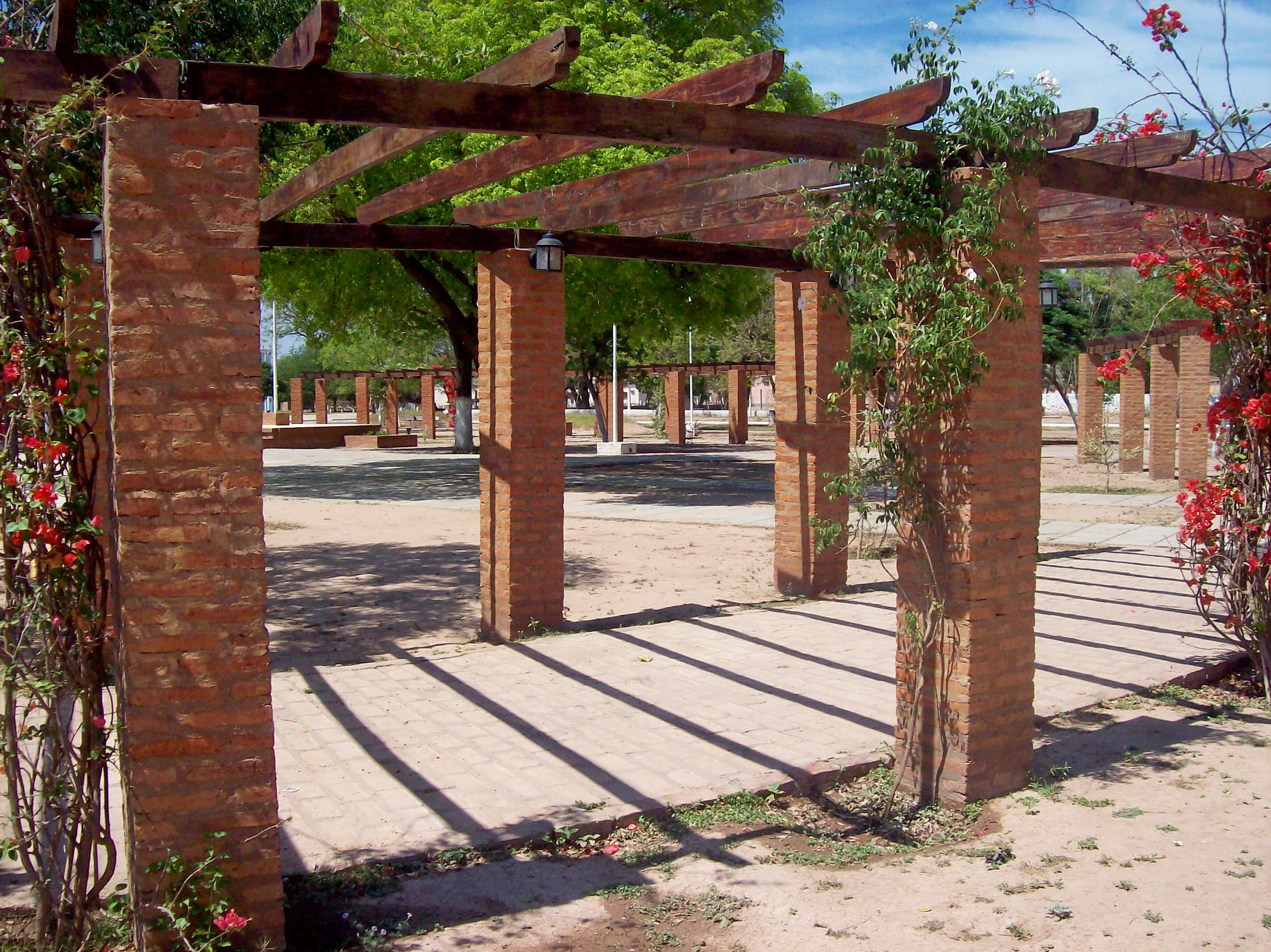
- Taco Pozo plaza
- Interactive map of Taco Pozo
- Country: Argentina
- Province: Chaco Province
- Time zone: UTC−3 (ART)

Taco Pozo is a village and municipality in Chaco Province in northern Argentina.

== Local celebrations ==
- Santa Rosa de Lima, August 30 (employee holiday).
- Anniversary of the locality, December 2.
