= Aviá Teraí =

Coordinates: 26°42′S 60°44′W

Aviá Terai
- Municipality and village
- Interactive map of Aviá Terai
- Country: Argentina
- Province: Chaco Province
- Time zone: UTC−3 (ART)

Aviá Terai is a village and municipality in Chaco Province in northern Argentina.
