= Charadai =

- Town
- Location in Argentina
- Coordinates: 27°37′S 59°53′W
- Country: Argentina
- Province: (Chaco Province) Chaco
- Department: Tapenagá
- 3rd level Municipality: Charadai
- Founded: 1905
- Elevation: 54 m (177 ft)

Population (2001 census [INDEC])
  - Total: 2,538
- Time zone: UTC−3 (ART)
- CPA Base: H 3513
- Area code: +54 3721
- Climate: Cfa

Charadai (or Charaday) is a village in Chaco Province, Argentina. It is the head town of the Tapenagá Department.
