= Las Garcitas, Chaco =

Coordinates: 26°35′S 59°48′W

Las Garcitas (Chaco)
- Municipality and village
- Plaza de Las Garcitas
- Interactive map of Las Garcitas (Chaco)
- Country: Argentina
- Province: Chaco Province
- Time zone: UTC−3 (ART)

Las Garcitas is a village and municipality in Chaco Province in northern Argentina.
