= Veinticinco de Mayo Department, Chaco =

Veinticinco de Mayo Department
- Department
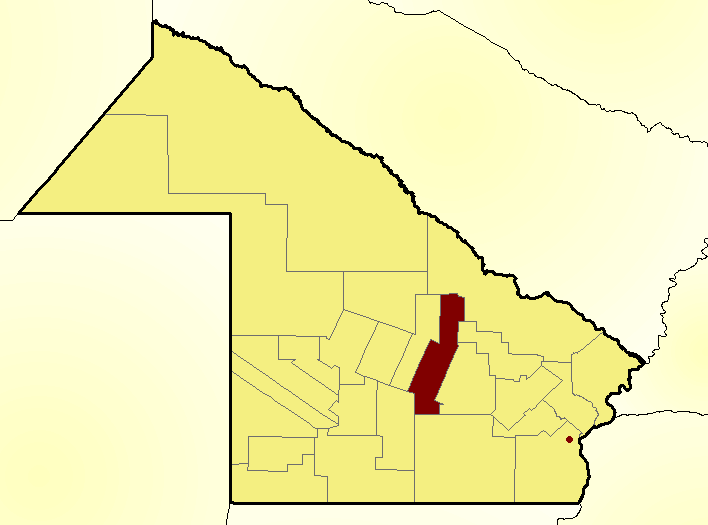
- Location of Veinticinco de Mayo Department within Chaco Province
- Coordinates: 26°55′S 60°3′W
- Country: Argentina
- Province: Chaco Province
- Head town: Machagai

Area
  - Total: 2,576 km^{2} (995 sq mi)

Population
  - Total: 28,070
  - Density: 10.90/km^{2} (28.22/sq mi)
- Demonym: Tapenagense
- Time zone: UTC-3 (ART)
- Postal code: H3534
- Area code: 03734

Veinticinco de Mayo is a department of Chaco Province in Argentina.

The provincial subdivision has a population of about 28,000 inhabitants in an area of 2,576 km², and its capital city is Machagai, which is located around 1,140 km from the Capital federal.

== Settlements ==
- Colonia Agricola Aborigen Chaco
- Colonia La Tambora
- Machagai
- Napalpi
