= El Espinillo, Chaco =

El Espinillo (Chaco)
- Municipality and village
- Location within Argentina
- Coordinates: 25°24′29″S 60°26′53″W
- Country: Argentina
- Province: Chaco Province

Area
  - Land: 6 km^{2} (2.3 sq mi)

Population (2001)
  - Total: 63
  - Density: 10/km^{2} (27/sq mi)
- Time zone: UTC−3 (ART)

El Espinillo is a village and municipality in Chaco Province in northern Argentina.
