= Santa Sylvina =

- Town
- Location of Santa Sylvina in Argentina
- Coordinates: 27°47′S 61°09′W
- Country: Argentina
- Province: Chaco
- Department: Fray Justo Santa María del Oro
- Elevation: 61 m (200 ft)

Population
  - Total: 9,040
- Time zone: UTC−3 (ART)
- CPA base: H3541
- Dialing code: +54 3735

Santa Sylvina is a town in Chaco Province, Argentina. It is the head town of the Fray Justo Santa María del Oro Department. The town was established in 1944.

== Festivals ==
- Fiesta Nacional de Caza de la Paloma
- Capital Nacional del Gaucho
