= Napenay =

- Municipality and village
- Location within Argentina
- Country: Argentina
- Province: Chaco Province
- Time zone: UTC−3 (ART)
- ISO 3166 code: AR-H

Napenay is a village and municipality in Chaco Province in northern Argentina.
