= Quitilipi Department =

- Department
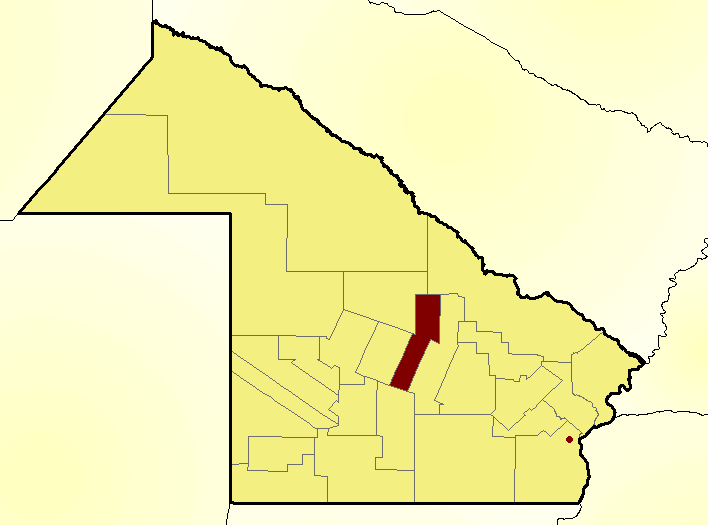
- Location of Quitilipi Department within Chaco Province
- Coordinates: 26°52′S 60°13′W
- Country: Argentina
- Province: Chaco Province
- Head town: Quitilipi

Area
  - Total: 1,545 km^{2} (597 sq mi)

Population
  - Total: 32,083
  - Density: 20.77/km^{2} (53.78/sq mi)
- Demonym: Quitilipense
- Time zone: UTC−3 (ART)
- Postal code: H3530
- Area code: 03732

Quitilipi is a central department of Chaco Province in Argentina.

The provincial subdivision has a population of about 32,000 inhabitants in an area of 1.545 km^{2}, and its capital city is Quitilipi, which is located some 1.160 km from the City of Buenos Aires.
