= Chaco Province =

Province of Argentina

Coordinates: 27°27′05″S 58°59′12″W

Chaco Provincia del Chaco (Spanish) To-kós-wet (Wichí Lhamtés Vejoz)
- Province
- Province of Chaco
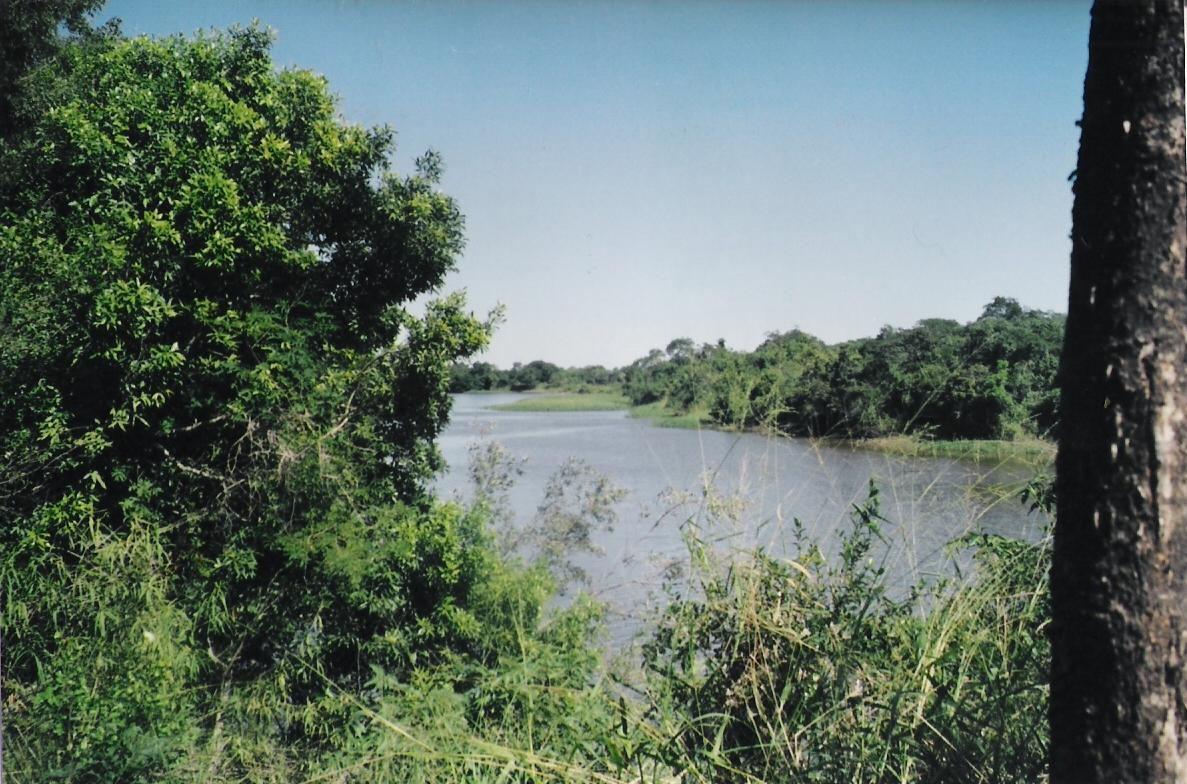
- View of the Black River near Resistencia

- Flag Coat of arms

- Location of Chaco within Argentina
- Country: Argentina
- Established: 8 August 1951
- Capital and largest city: Resistencia

Government
  - Governor: Leandro Zdero (UCR)
  - Vice Governor: Vacant
  - Legislature: 32
  - National Deputies: 7
  - National Senators: Inés Pilatti Vergara (FDT); Antonio José Rodas (FDT); Víctor Zimmermann (JXC)

Area Ranked 12th
  - Total: 99,633 km^{2} (38,469 sq mi)

Population (2022 census)
  - Total: 1,142,963
  - Rank: 11th
  - Density: 11.472/km^{2} (29.712/sq mi)
- Demonym(s): Chacoan, chaqueño

GDP
  - Total: US$ 16.5 billion
  - Per capita: US$ 13,500
- Time zone: UTC−3 (ART)
- ISO 3166 code: AR-H
- Languages: Spanish (official); Wichí (co-official); Toba (co-official); Mocoví (co-official)
- HDI (2021): 0.808 very high (24th)
- Website: www.chaco.gov.ar

Chaco (Spanish pronunciation: [ˈtʃako]; Wichi: To-kós-wet), officially the Province of Chaco (Spanish: Provincia del Chaco [pɾoˈβinsja ðel ˈtʃako]) is one of the 23 provinces of Argentina. Its capital and largest city is Resistencia. It is located in the north-east of the country.

It is bordered by Salta and Santiago del Estero to the west, Formosa to the north, Corrientes to the east, and Santa Fe to the south. It also has an international border with the Paraguayan department of Ñeembucú. With an area of 99,633 km^{2} (38,469 sq mi) and a population of 1,142,963 as of 2022, it is the twelfth most extensive, and the eleventh most populated, of Argentina's provinces.

In 2010, Chaco became the second province in Argentina to adopt more than one official language. These are the Kom, Moqoit and Wichí languages, spoken by the Toba, Mocovi and Wichí peoples respectively. Chaco has historically been among Argentina's poorest provinces, and currently ranks last both by GDP per capita and Human Development Index.

== Etymology ==
Chaco derives from chaku, the Quechua word used to name a hunting territory or the hunting technique used by the people of the Inca Empire.

Annually, large groups of up to thirty thousand hunters would enter the territory, forming columns and circling their prey. Jesuit missioner Pedro Lozano wrote in his book Chorographic Description of the Great Chaco Gualamba, published in Cordoba, Spain in 1733: "Its etymology indicates the multitude of nations that inhabit that region. When they go hunting, the Indians gather from many parts the vicuñas and guanacos; that crowd is called chacu in the Quechua language, which is common in Peru, and that Spaniards have corrupted into Chaco".

However, the earliest known mention of the term in a document was in a letter written to Fernando Torres de Portugal y Mesía, Viceroy of Peru, dated in 1589, by the then Governor of Tucumán, Juan Ramírez de Velasco, who referred to the region as Chaco Gualamba. (The term Gualamba is of uncertain origin and has since fallen into disuse.)

== Geography ==
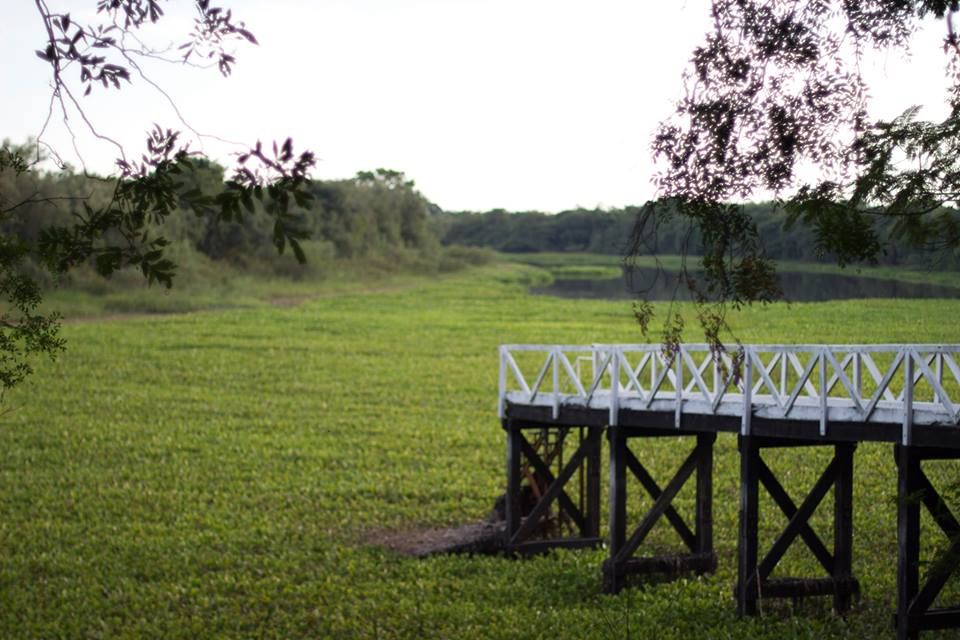
Dock on a southeastern wetland close to Paraná River

The province of Chaco lies within the southern part of the Gran Chaco region, a vast lowland plain that covers territories in Argentina, Paraguay, and Bolivia.

Chaco Province covers an area of 99,633 km^{2} (38,469 sq mi) and ranks as the twelfth largest Argentinian province. The highest ground in the province is also the most western, near the municipality of Taco Pozo, at an elevation of 272 m (892 ft) above sea level.

The Paraná and Paraguay rivers separate Chaco province from Corrientes Province and the Republic of Paraguay. To the north, the river Bermejo forms another natural border, dividing Chaco Province from Formosa Province.

In the south, the border follows the 28th parallel south, separating the region from Santa Fe Province, while in the west it borders Salta and Santiago del Estero.

Other important rivers include: the Negro, Tapenagá, Palometa, and Salado, all tributaries or anabranches of the river Paraná.

=== Climate ===
Köppen climate map of Chaco, Argentina

The province has a subtropical climate. It is divided in two different climate zones: a more humid one in the east and a drier subtropical climate in the center and west. The eastern parts of the province have a humid subtropical climate (Cfa under the Köppen climate classification) with no dry season. In the west where precipitation is lower, it has a subtropical climate with a dry winter and is classified as a semi-arid climate (BS under the Köppen climate classification) due to potential evapotranspiration exceeding precipitation.

=== Precipitation ===
In the most humid (eastern) parts of the province, precipitation falls throughout the year with no dry season. These areas receive around 1,400 millimetres (55 in) of precipitation per year. Precipitation decreases westwards and become more concentrated in the summer months.

=== Temperature ===
Mean annual temperatures range between 21 and 23 °C (70 and 73 °F), which decreases from north to south. Summers are hot with temperatures that can reach up to 38 to 41 °C (100 to 106 °F) in the eastern parts of the province. The western parts experience more variation in temperatures due continental influences; extreme temperatures in summer are more extreme with temperatures that frequently exceed 40 °C (104 °F). During winters, incursions of cold, polar air from the south can lead to frosts and temperatures that fall below freezing. Being under an area of high solar radiation during summer, a consequence is that a low pressure system forms over the province during summer.

=== Humidity ===
Humidity in the province is high due to its climate, particularly in the north, the wettest portion of the province. Most of the winds that transport humid air come from the north and east. Winters are the most humid seasons (high humidity) due to this season being characterized by frequent fogs.

== History ==
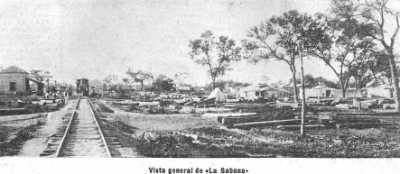
La Sabana and its new railway station in 1899

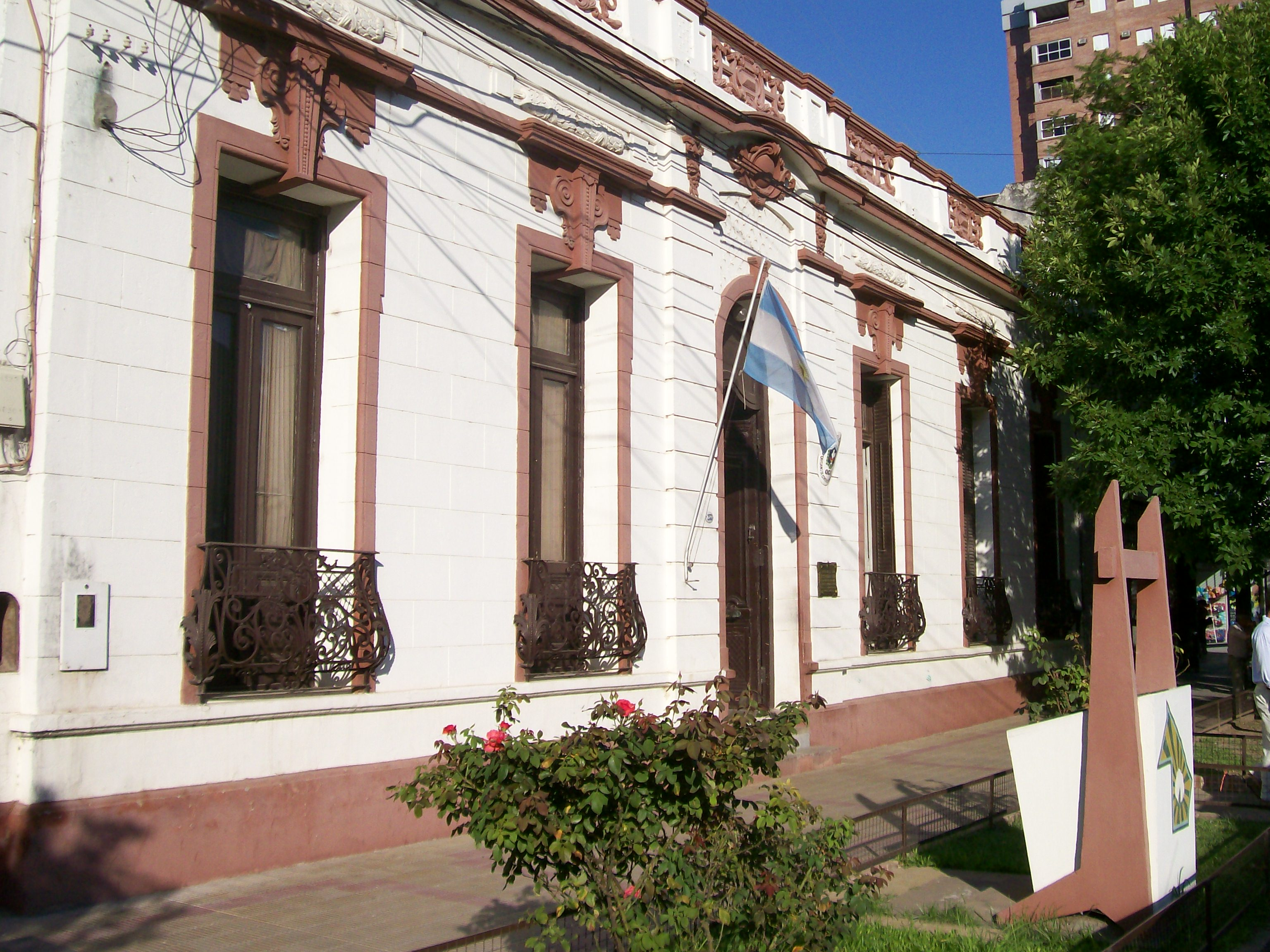
Territorial Governor's House

The area was originally inhabited by various hunter-gatherers speaking languages from the Mataco-Guaicru family. Native tribes including the Toba, and Wichí survive in the region and have important communities in this province as well as in Formosa Province.

In 1576, the governor of a province in Northern Argentina commissioned the military to search for a huge mass of iron, which he had heard that natives used for their weapons. The natives called the area Heavenly Fields, which was translated into Spanish as Campo del Cielo. This area is now a protected region situated on the border between the provinces of Chaco and Santiago del Estero where a group of iron meteorites fell in a Holocene impact event some four to five thousand years ago. In 2015, Police arrested four alleged smugglers trying to steal over a ton of legally protected meteoric iron.

The first European settlement was founded by Spanish conquistador Alonso de Vera y Aragón, in 1585, and was called Concepción de Nuestra Señora. It was abandoned in 1632. During its existence, it was one of the most important cities in the region, but attacks from local Indians forced the residents to leave. In the 17th century, the San Fernando del Río Negro Jesuit mission was founded in the area of the modern-day city of Resistencia, but it was abandoned fifteen years later.

The Gran Chaco region remained largely unexplored, and uninhabited, by either Europeans or Argentines until the late 19th century, after numerous confrontations between Argentina and Paraguay during the War of the Triple Alliance. San Fernando was re-established as a military outpost, and was renamed Resistencia in 1876.

The Territorio Nacional del Gran Chaco was established in 1872. This territory, which included the current Formosa Province and lands presently inside Paraguay, was superseded by Territorio Nacional del Chaco upon its administrative division, in 1884.

== 20th century ==
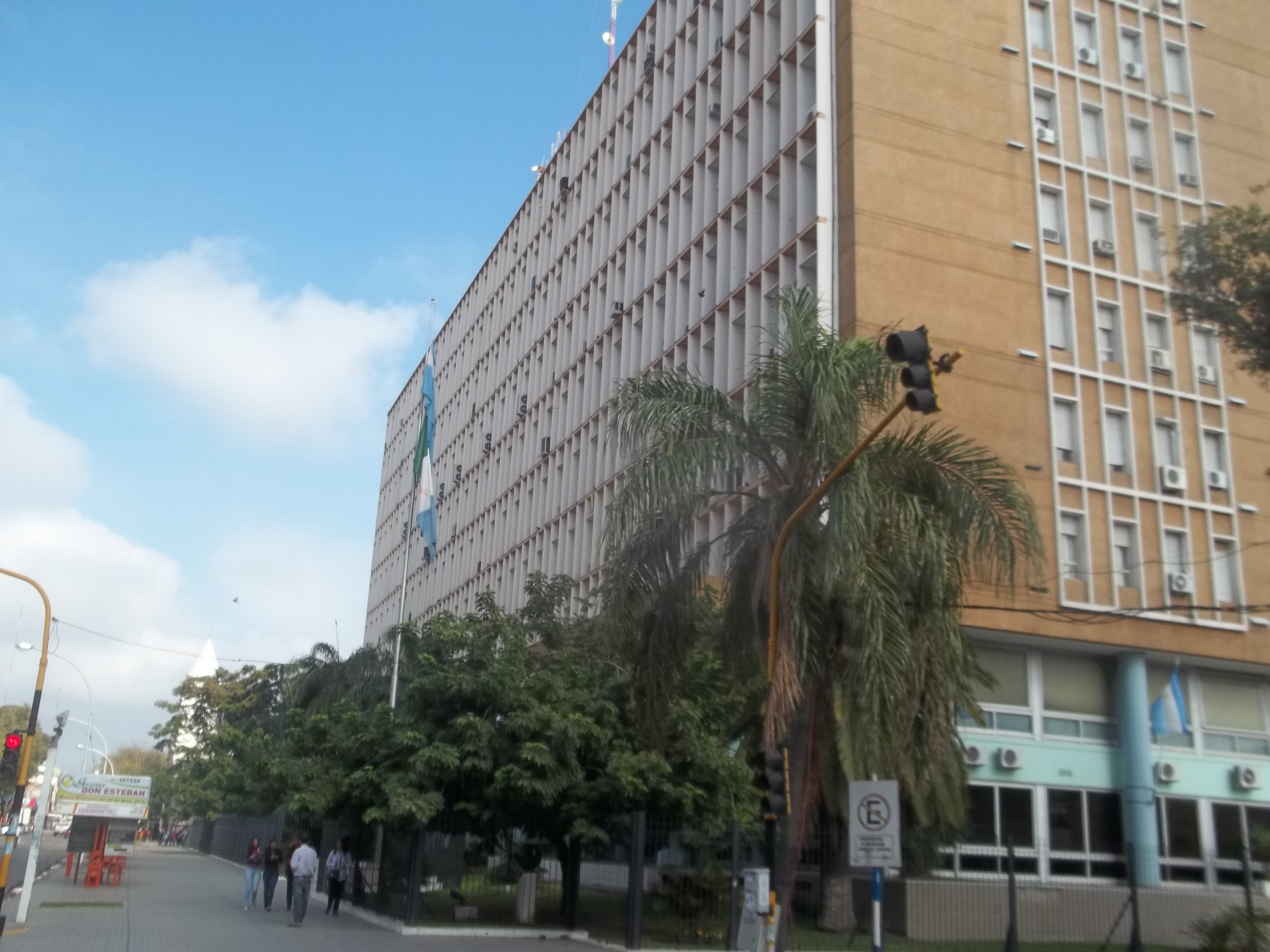
The Provincial Government House. Designed in 1955, political disputes delayed its completion until 1972.

Between the end of the nineteenth and the first decades of the twentieth centuries, the province received a variety of immigrants, among them Volga Germans and Mennonites from Russia, Germany, and Canada. They, alongside other immigrants, transformed Chaco into a productive farming region known for its dairy and beef production.

=== Political structure ===
In 1951, the territory became a province; further, its name was changed to Provincia Presidente Perón. The province was renamed again in 1955 when the government of President Juan Perón was overthrown, returning to the historical name of Chaco. Chaco voters, however, continued to support Peronist candidates in subsequent elections, notably Deolindo Bittel whose three terms as governor in the 1960s and 1970s were each cut short by military intervention. Bitell subsequently ran for vice-president in the 1983 Argentine Presidential elections and later served as mayor of the provincial capital, Resistencia.

=== Infrastructure ===
With few paved highways, and thus an overdependence on passenger rail services, Chaco was adversely impacted by the national rail privatizations and line closures of the early 1990s. In 1997, the services that had been previously run by the state-owned company Ferrocarriles Argentinos since railway nationalization in 1948, were taken over by the Servicios Ferroviarios del Chaco S.A. (SEFECHA) (Chaco Railway Services), making SEFECHA, at the time, the only publicly owned commuter rail service in Argentina. SEFECHA currently carries nearly a million passengers a year and has contributed to the province's vigorous recovery from the 2002 crisis.

=== Poverty ===
Chaco Province continues to suffer from the worst social indicators in the country with 49.3% of its population living below the poverty line by income and with 17.5% of children between the ages of two and five in a state of malnutrition in 2009. Among Argentine provinces, it ranks last by GDP per capita and 21st by Human Development Index, only above its neighbors Formosa and Santiago del Estero.

=== Official languages ===
In 2010, Chaco became the second province in Argentina to declare indigenous languages official within the province, after Corrientes. Three local languages gained official status in Chaco besides Spanish: Kom, Moqoit, and Wichí.

== Demographics ==
Chaco population pyramid 2022

According to the 2022 Argentine national census, the province of Chaco has 1,142,963 inhabitants.

== Economy ==
Chaco's economy, like most in the region, is relatively underdeveloped, yet has recovered vigorously since 2002. It was estimated to be US$4.397 billion in 2006, or US$4,467 per capita (half the national average and the third-lowest in Argentina). Chaco's economy is diversified, but its agricultural sector has suffered from recurrent droughts over the past decade.

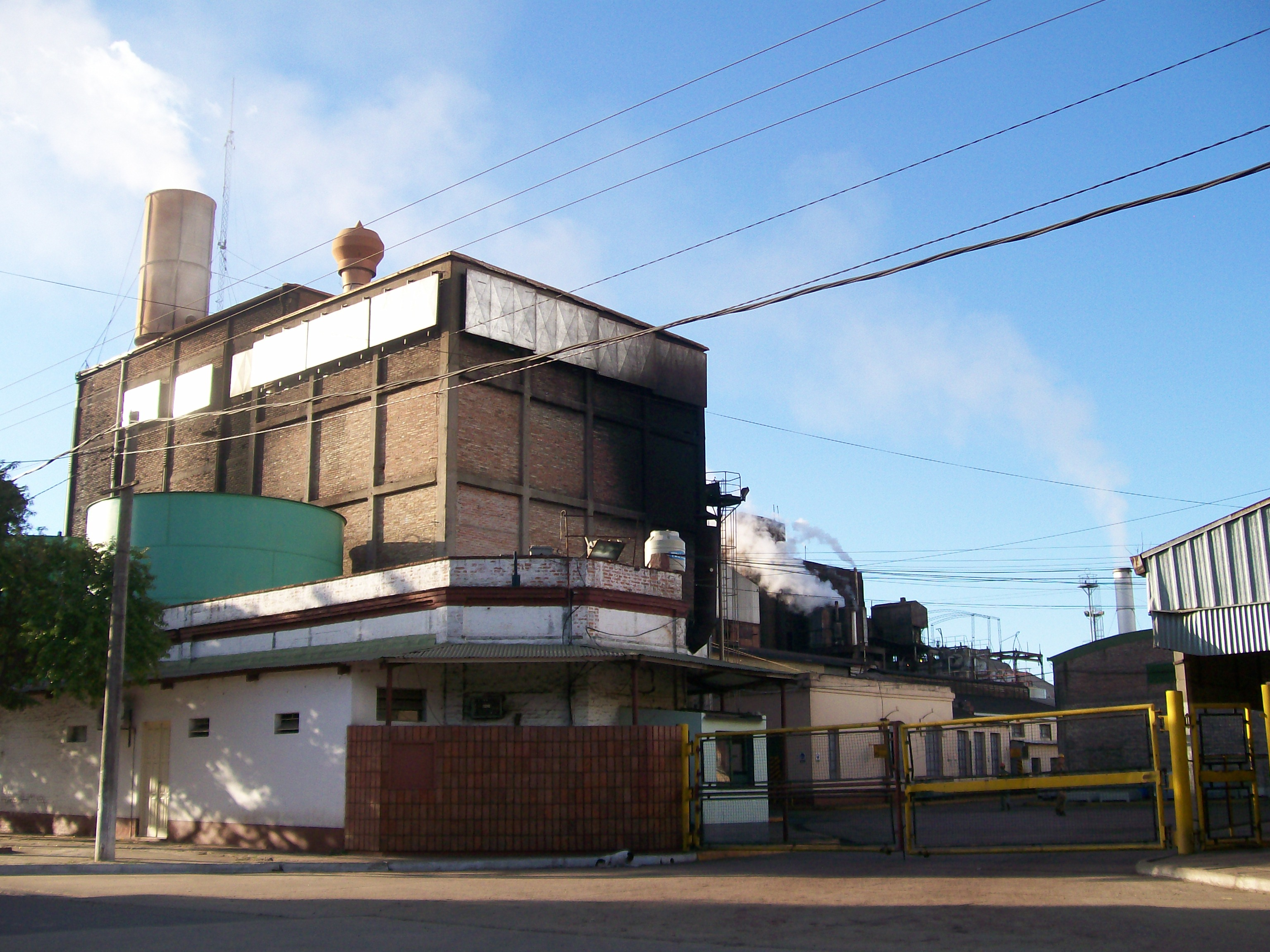
Tannin factory in Puerto Tirol.

Agricultural development in Chaco is predominantly associated with the commercial growing of quebracho wood and cotton. Chaco currently produces 60% of Argentina's national cotton production. Agricultural food production accounts for 17% of Argentina's output. This includes crops such as soy, sorghum, and maize. Sugarcane is also cultivated in the south, as well as rice and tobacco to a lesser degree.

Cattle breeds consisting of crosses with zebu are regarded as better adapted to the high temperatures, grass shortage and occasional flooding than intensively reared pure-breeds.

Industrial contributes approximately 10% to the provincial economy and includes textiles produced from local cotton, oil and coal production, and sugar, alcohol and paper, all derived from sugar cane.

Chaco is home to the Chaco National Park, but tourism is not a well-developed industry in the province. The province's main airport, Resistencia International Airport, serves around 100,000 passengers annually.

== Government ==
The provincial government is divided into the usual three branches: the executive, headed by a popularly elected governor, who appoint the cabinet; the legislative; and the judiciary, headed by the Supreme Court and completed by several inferior tribunals.

The Constitution of Chaco Province forms the formal law of the province.

In Argentina, the most important law enforcement organization is the Argentine Federal Police; additional work is also carried out by the Chaco Provincial Police.

== Political organization ==
The province is divided into 25 departments (Spanish: departamentos).

Department	Seat	Area (km2)	Population (2010)	Population (2001)	Density (2010)
Almirante Brown	Pampa del Infierno	17,276	34,075	29,086	1.97
Bermejo	La Leonesa	2,562	25,052	24,215	9.77
Chacabuco	Charata	1,378	30,590	27,813	22.19
Comandante Fernández	Presidencia Roque Sáenz Peña	1,500	96,944	88,164	64.63
12 de Octubre	General Pinedo	2,576	22,281	20,149	8.65
2 de Abril	Hermoso Campo	1,594	7,432	7,435	4.66
Fray Justo Santa María de Oro	Santa Sylvina	2,205	11,826	10,485	5.36
General Belgrano	Corzuela	1,218	11,988	10,470	9.84
General Donovan	Makallé	1,487	13,490	13,385	9.07
General Güemes	Juan José Castelli	25,487	67,132	62,227	2.63
Independencia	Campo Largo	1,871	22,411	20,620	11.98
Libertad	Puerto Tirol	1,088	12,158	10,822	11.17
Libertador General San Martín	General José de San Martín	7,800	59,147	54,470	7.58
Maipú	Tres Isletas	2,855	25,288	24,747	8.85
Mayor Luis J. Fontana	Villa Ángela	3,708	55,080	53,550	14.85
9 de Julio	Las Breñas	2,097	28,555	26,955	13.61
O'Higgins	San Bernardo	1,580	20,131	19,231	12.74
Presidencia de la Plaza	Presidencia de la Plaza	2,284	12,499	12,231	5.47
Primero de Mayo	Margarita Belén	1,864	10,322	9,131	5.53
Quitilipi	Quitilipi	1,545	34,081	32,083	22.05
San Fernando	Resistencia	3,489	390,874	365,637	112.03
San Lorenzo	Villa Berthet	2,135	14,702	14,252	6.88
Sargento Cabral	Colonia Elisa	1,651	15,899	15,030	9.63
Tapenagá	Charadai	6,025	4,097	4,188	0.68
25 de Mayo	Machagai	2,358	29,215	28,070	12.39

== Villages ==
- Aviá Teraí
- Colonia Aborigen El Pastoril
- Colonia Baranda
- Colonias Unidas
- Comandancia Frías
- Cote Lai
- El Espinillo
- El Sauzal
- El Sauzalito
- El Tacuruzal
- Estación General Obligado
- Fortín Las Chuñas
- Fuerte Esperanza
- General Vedia
- Haumonia
- La Chiquita
- La Escondida
- La Leonesa
- La Liguria
- Las Garcitas
- Mesón de Fierro
- Napenay
- Pampa Landriel
- Pampa Mangrullo
- Paraje San Fernando
- Pueblo Clodomiro Díaz
- Puerto Bastiani
- Puerto Eva Perón, Chaco
- Puerto Lavalle
- Samuhú, Chaco
- Selvas del Río de Oro
- Villa Jalón

== See also ==
- Campo del Cielo
- Napalpí massacre
