= Concepción de Buena Esperanza =

Former Spanish colonial city in Chaco Province, Argentina (1585–1632)

Concepción de Buena Esperanza Concepción del Bermejo
- Former city
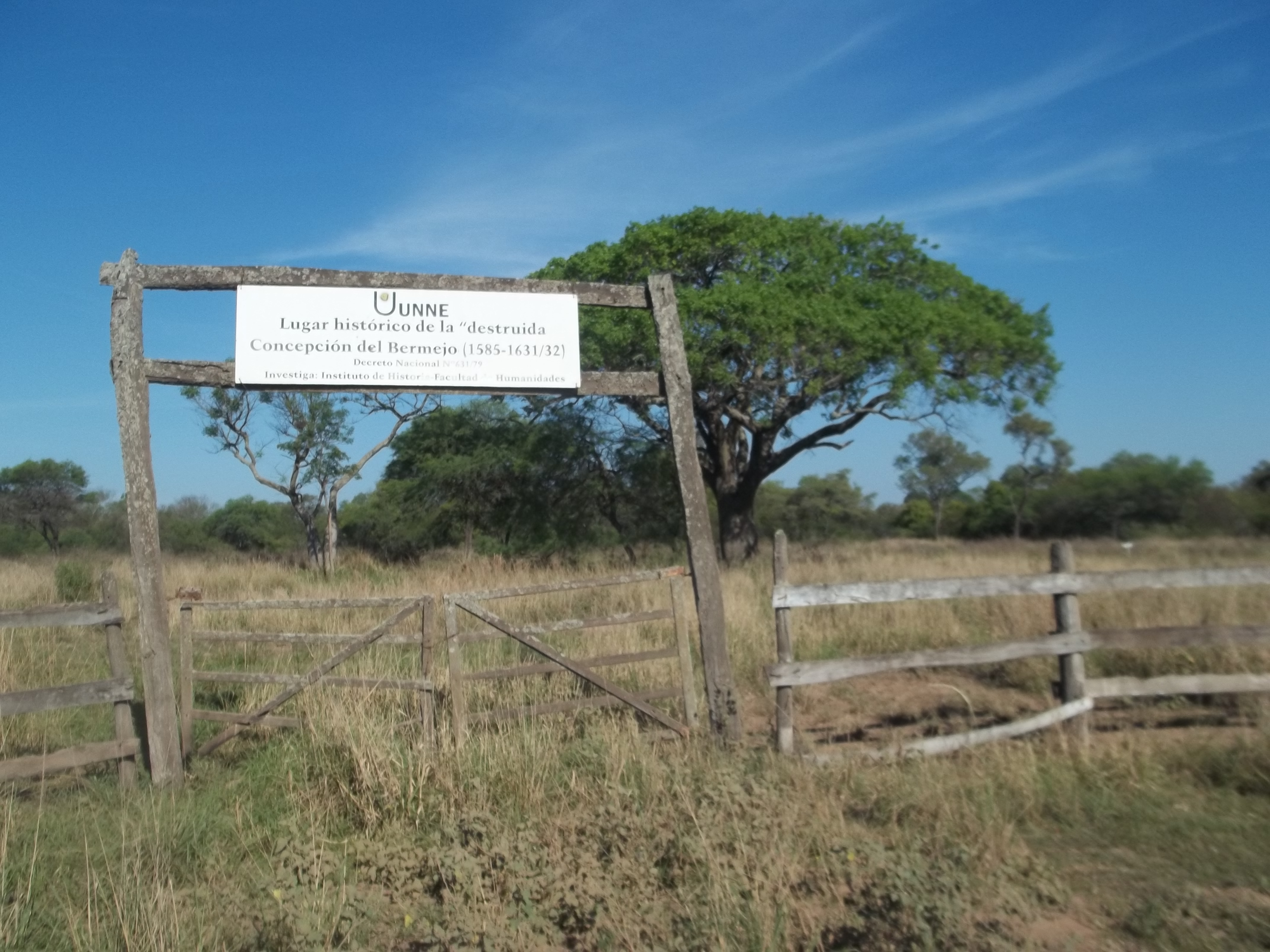
- Entry sign to the Km 75 Ruins

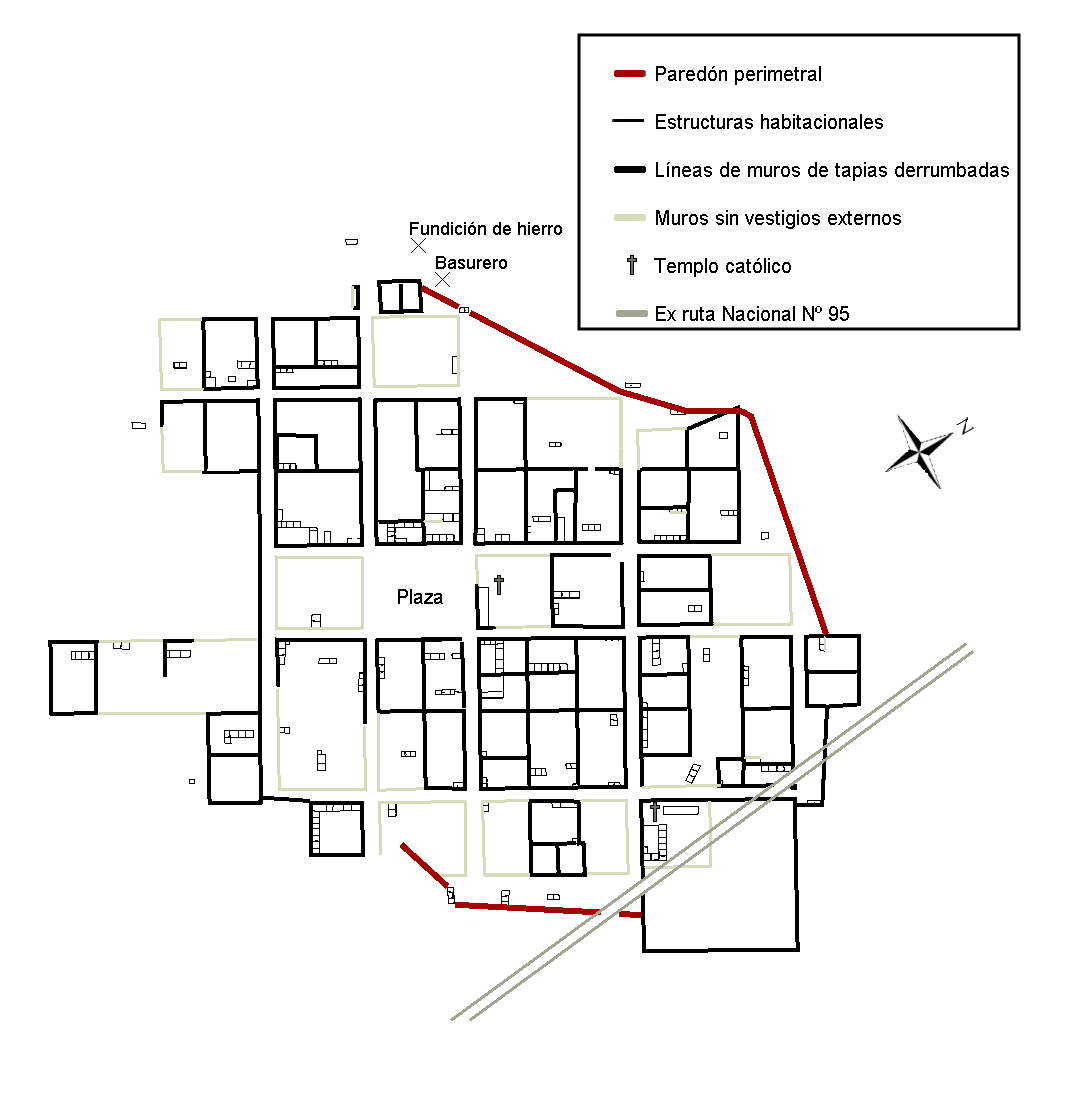
- Plan of the city of Concepción del Bermejo based on the study of the ruins at km 75.

- Location within Argentina
- Coordinates: 26°08′00″S 60°19′00″W
- Country: Spanish Empire
- Governorate: Buenos Aires (from 1617)
- Location: El Destierro, Chaco Province, Argentina
- Founded: April 14, 1585 (by Alonso de Vera y Aragón)
- Abandoned: Between 1631 and 1632

Population
  - Total: 500

Concepción de Buena Esperanza—also known as Concepción del Bermejo—was a Spanish city that existed between 1585 and 1632 in the present-day territory of Chaco Province, Argentina. It depended de facto on the Governorate of the Río de la Plata and Paraguay and was claimed by the Governorate of Tucumán until 1617, when it became part of the Governorate of Buenos Aires. Its foundation marked the most effective period of Spanish occupation in the Southern Chaco region (Concepción became the second city in its governorship), a territory that the Spanish Crown never fully subjugated despite considering it its property. It is worth noting that the first city located in the Gran Chaco region in Argentina would be founded in the second half of the 19th century.

Its foundation in 1585 was part of the same founding wave that, starting from Asunción, gave rise to Buenos Aires, Santa Fe de la Vera Cruz, and Corrientes. The city was born in a strategic location, as a stage on the indigenous path known as the macomita path, which connected through the Southern Chaco the city of Asunción in the east with the also vanished Talavera del Esteco in the west. Its population was estimated at around 500 people, and economic activity revolved around the trade of goods and especially the encomienda system, through which the Spaniards subjected the numerous indigenous population of the area to forced labor. These encomiendas were located not only in Concepción but also in two indigenous settlements closely linked to it, known as Matará or Matalá and Guacará.

The belligerence, nomadism, and lack of a common culture among the indigenous nations occupying the Chaco made their adaptation to agricultural work, as well as their evangelization, very difficult. Over the years, resentment toward the Spaniards grew, while the defense of Concepción weakened. In 1631, a coalition of tribes carried out a massive attack on Matará, in whose defense much of Concepción's garrison perished, forcing the survivors to exodus to the city of Corrientes. In the following years, there were several attempts to repopulate the city, but none succeeded, until finally in 1645 its Cabildo was dissolved and its inhabitants became residents of Corrientes. The abandonment of Concepción had disastrous consequences for the commercial line between Paraguay and Tucumán, and in turn left a vast area open to the Chaco tribes, from which they increased their attacks on Spanish cities.

In 1943, Alfredo Martinet discovered the remains of Concepción in what would later be called the Km 75 Ruins, although 15 years passed before the find was definitively linked to the colonial city, and another 13 years for a formal investigation led by historian Eldo Morresi to confirm this conclusion. The main reason for such delay in conclusions was the remoteness of the site from the Bermejo River, on whose banks it was erroneously assumed the settlement should be located. The site—declared a National Historic Place—is located alongside the former National Route 95, 25 kilometers from Tres Isletas and 75 kilometers from Presidencia Roque Sáenz Peña, which is why it is known as the Km 75 Ruins.

== Geography ==
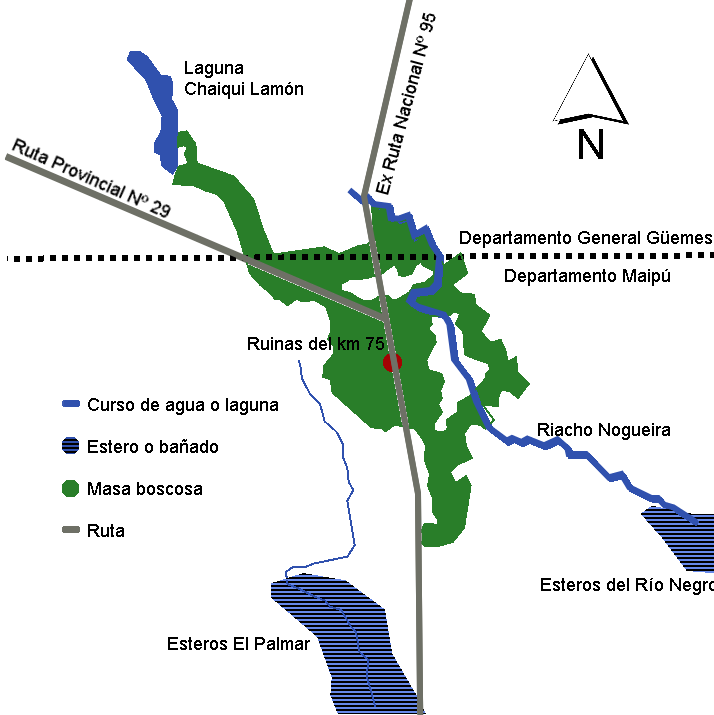
Map of a sector approximately 10 kilometers around the Km 75 Ruins prepared in 1971.

With the discovery and study of the Km 75 Ruins, it was definitively established that Concepción del Bermejo was located approximately 60 km west of the river that gave it its name, in an area of 30 hectares centered approximately at coordinates 26°08′00″S 60°19′00″W. The site is in a place known as El Destierro, north of Maipú Department (jurisdiction of the municipality of Tres Isletas), and just 2 kilometers from the border with General Güemes Department. It is about 25 kilometers north of Tres Isletas, about 38 kilometers west of Pampa del Indio, and about 38 kilometers southeast of the city of Juan José Castelli.

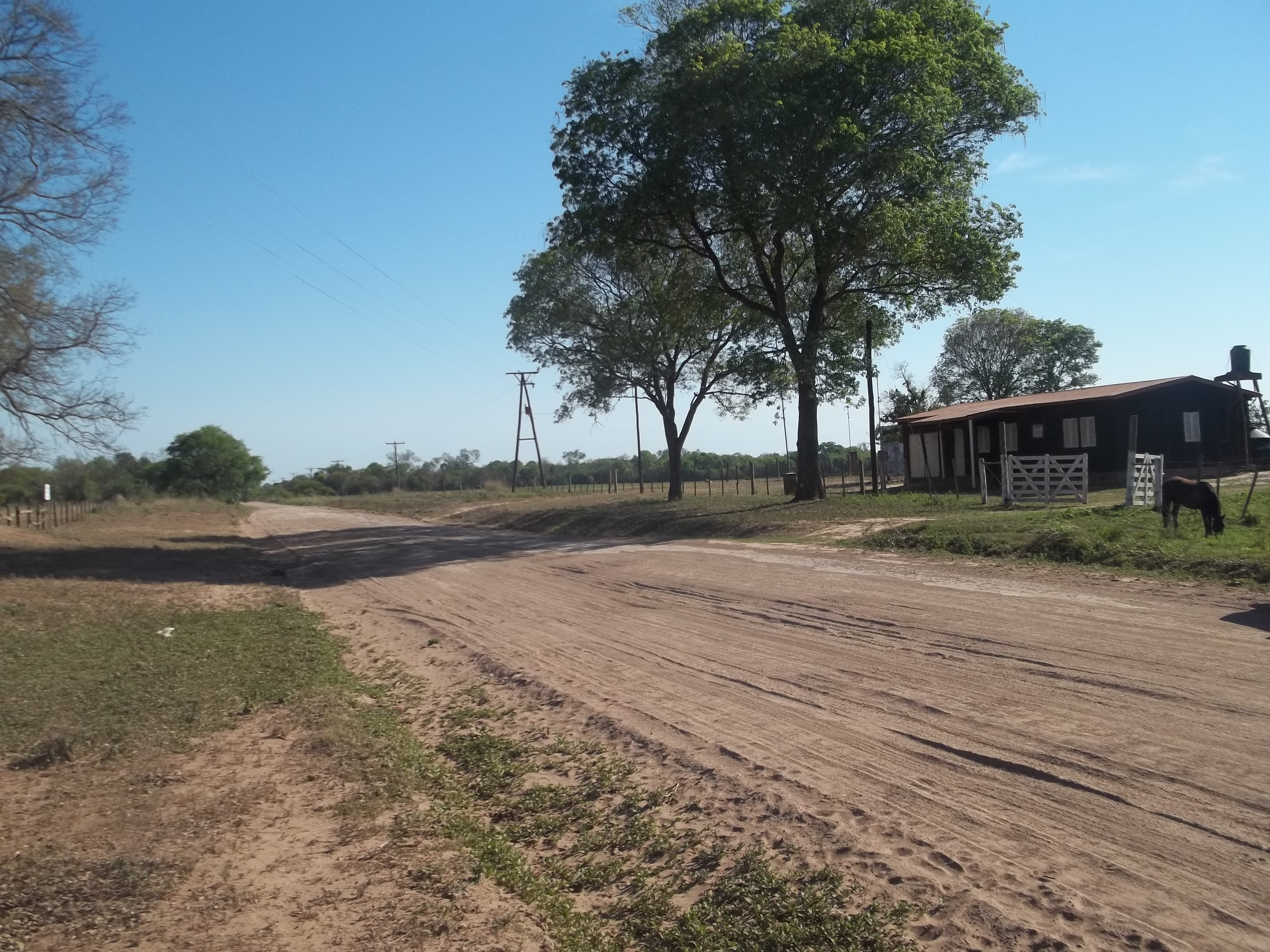
Provincial Route 29 alongside the passage through the ruins; the caretaker's house is visible.

The former National Route 95 (dirt road) passes by the ruins, crossing a small section transversely. 700 meters to the north is the intersection with Provincial Route No. 29 (also unpaved), which connects it northwest to Castelli and east to Pampa del Indio.

At a minimum distance of 1000 meters eastward and northeastward is the bed—generally dry—of the Nogueira Stream. To the northwest (about 6.5 km) is another hydrographic feature, the small Chaiqui Lamón Lagoon, whose waters drain during rainy periods southeastward to reach the El Palmar Estuary, 3 kilometers southwest of Concepción.

=== Natural environment ===
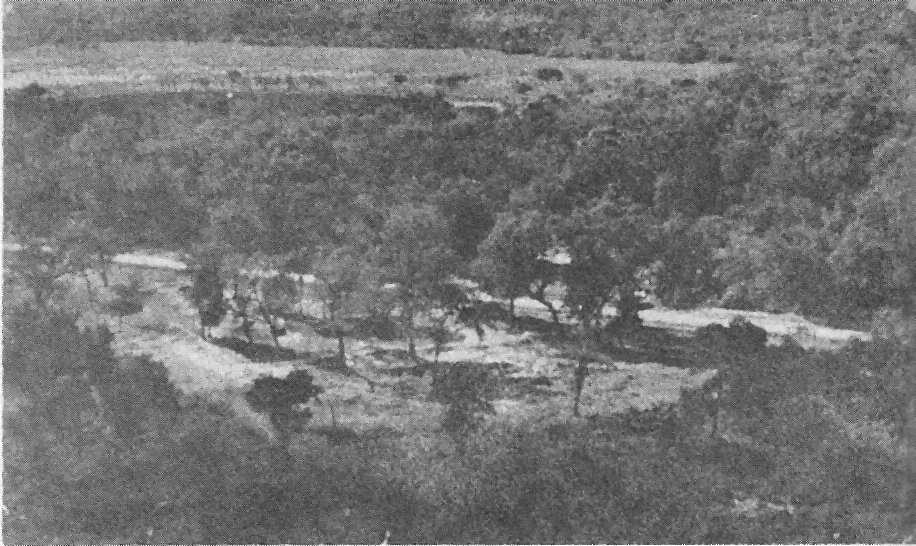
Aerial view of the sector corresponding to the Km 75 Ruins. The clearing where the archaeological study was conducted, the former National Route No. 95, and the dense Chaco forest that hid the remains of Concepción are visible.

The ruins of Concepción are located in a wooded sector of approximately circular shape with a diameter of about 2.5 km. The tree layer consists of Chaco species in a park type. The understory is formed by thorny shrubs that hinder passage and are characteristic of this jungle, known as El Impenetrable precisely because of this type of vegetation. According to meteorological data from the city of Juan José Castelli, the rainfall regime corresponds to a transitional Mediterranean-monsoonal type, with two precipitation peaks: one in March and another in December; while the dry period runs from May to September with a minimum in July.

The average elevation above sea level is 99 meters, with an average gradient of 50 cm per kilometer, somewhat higher than the provincial average. This leveling favors water runoff during rains, which drain into the lateral systems of the Nogueira Stream and Chaiqui Lamón Lagoon. The wooded islet where Concepción was settled serves as a watershed divider for these basins, constituting a privileged site within a wide region, and therefore ideal for an urban settlement.

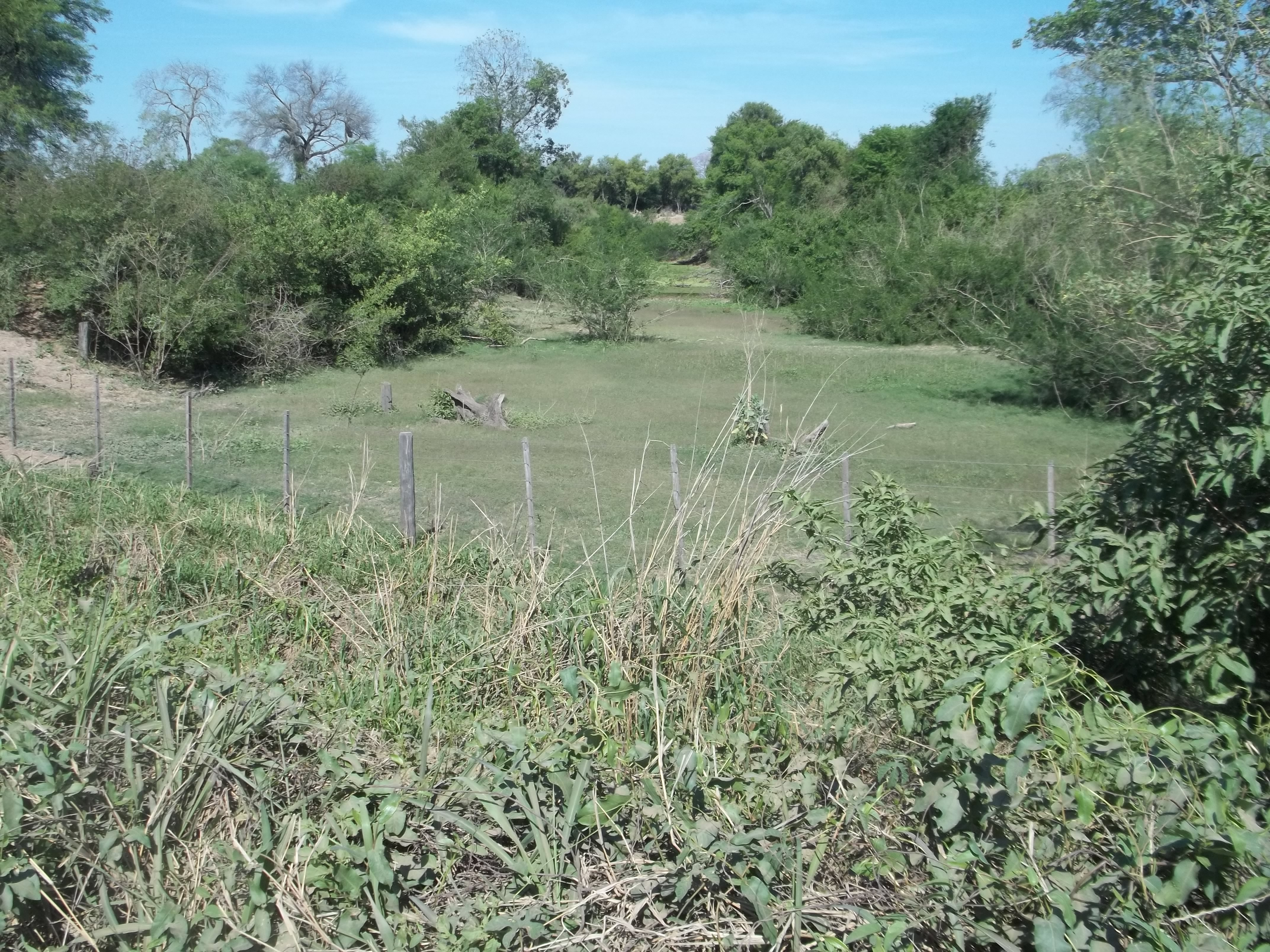
Bed of the Nogueira Stream near Concepción; its bed shows sections with stagnant water and others dry.

Regarding the Nogueira Stream, its bed is excessive for the meager amount of water it carries in rainy seasons, so it is certain that in other times it was part of the Bermejo River's hydrological system. It is also impossible to fix the active period of this stream, although it is highly probable that at that time it was at least partially fed by the Bermejo River. Finally, it seems unlikely that the Bermejo River's bed was south of its current fluvial valley during Concepción's time, ruling out its proximity to Concepción during its lifespan.

=== Questions about the location of Concepción ===
The location of Concepción was a great mystery for historians studying it, as the few documents referencing coordinates are imprecise and in many cases incorrect. To this must be added the erroneous belief that the annex del Bermejo in the name referred to its location on the Bermejo River, whose course is known to have varied over these centuries, but without knowing exactly the path it may have taken during Concepción's time. This belief was mainly sustained by a letter in which the founder Alonso de Vera describes having followed the river's course to found the city; the content of this letter was qualified as dark and imprecise, and therefore the true meaning of Alonso de Vera's words was questioned. It is also logical to assume that a watercourse as important as the Bermejo would be fundamental for choosing the site of a human settlement; however, during the foundation of Concepción, the existence of an indigenous settlement was paramount, given the need for labor; the presence of a prior indigenous human nucleus in the creation of Concepción was demonstrated in the archaeological excavations of its remains.

A letter from the Bishop of Tucumán details that Concepción is 40 leagues from Corrientes, which agrees with the location of the Km 75 Ruins. Although not expressed directly, the same distance between Corrientes and Concepción can be deduced from a report by Governor Diego de Góngora. The most compelling written evidence rejecting Concepción's proximity to the Bermejo River is given by Góngora's report, which explicitly states that neither Concepción nor its encomiendas have a river, but rather a rainwater lagoon and swamps. He also does not mention any active Bermejo course nearby, something the governor could not have overlooked in his report. Another contribution in this regard is a 1775 map—highly accurate for the time—which places Concepción far from the Bermejo River.

The most precise document regarding its location corresponds to the diaries of Colonel Francisco Gavino Arias's expedition to the Chaco in 1776, nearly 150 years after Concepción's abandonment. Gavino Arias sent Captain Juan José Acevedo to clarify the exact site of Concepción. The expedition was successful, stating that the remains were in the southern part, in a very thick forest and impenetrable thicket... that would be about 30 leagues from this camp at La Cangayé.... As confirming data, we have that the bell from the destroyed Concepción del Bermejo was later installed in the temple of the La Cangayé reduction. The discovery of the La Cangayé ruins would be vital to restrict the search radius for Concepción using Arias's references.

Historian Altamirano, for his part, proposes an alternative solution: Concepción was founded on the Bermejo River and later moved to the site of the Km 75 ruins. He takes as references the statements of Ruy Díaz de Guzmán—contemporary with the foundation—who calls it Puerto de la Concepción, as well as those of priests Martín Dobrizhoffer and José Solís, both in the18th century; Dobrizhoffer claims to have seen the city ruins covered by algarrobos, and Solís that it was founded 90 leagues from Santiago del Estero, a distance equivalent to that of the Bermejo River. The founding act itself established the power to move it, and Altamirano assumes this was done due to the impossibility of subjugating the indigenous people of the first settlement and the need for indigenous labor, which they found among the Matará people.

== Urban layout ==
One of the greatest difficulties in associating the Km 75 Ruins with Concepción has been the lack of a historical plan of the extinct city. The detailed plan of the ruins made by Alfredo Martinet and his son in 1958 nevertheless allowed associating them with Concepción, considering the city's size (approximately 30 hectares), which not only rules out the possibility of an indigenous settlement but coincides with contemporary testimonies regarding its population, estimated at around 500 people. The title of city was clearly pompous for the size of the town, although at that time city titles were more a legal figure than an urban reality.

Concepción's layout was characterized by constructions of the pisé type, typical of Spanish cities of the era. All constructions respond to square or rectangular forms, with subdivision of blocks into solars observed.

The site is level, except for some depressions that surely served initially to extract earth for building and later as water reservoirs. The norm of the era included a grid layout, which we do not find in Concepción. However, there were also cities that did not respect the grid, though they did the rectangular form, among which we can highlight Asunción del Paraguay and Villa Rica del Espíritu Santo, which shares with Concepción both the foundation date and the abandonment date.

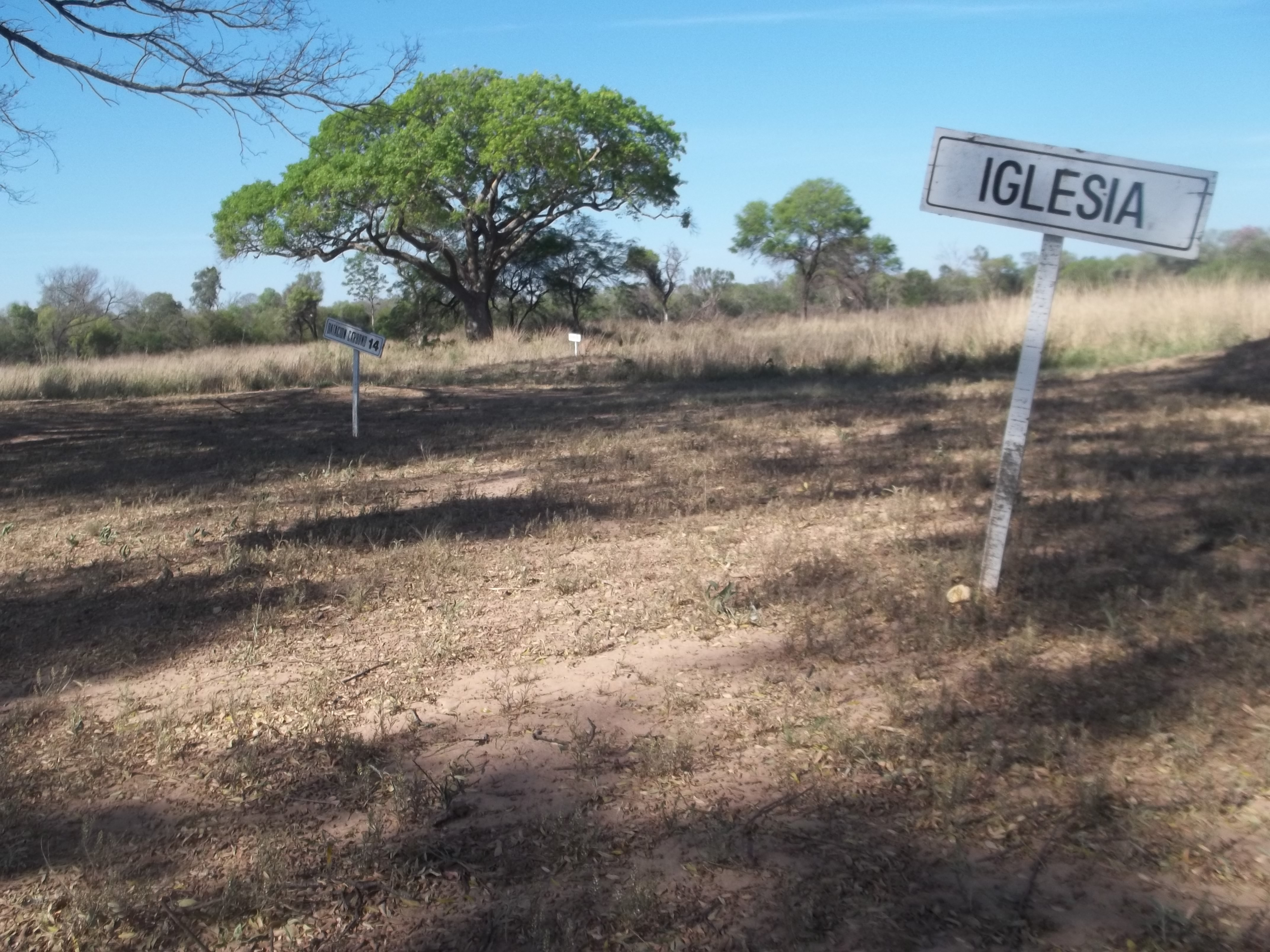
Sign indicating the presence of the Catholic temple.

A total of 18 blocks and 89 structures have been identified. The block measurements are irregular, although many have striking similarity to other cities of the era. In turn, 5 streets with northwest-southeast orientation and the same number with southwest-northeast orientation were found; all streets are 12 meters wide. The main square occupies a central position, and facing its north side is the Catholic temple. This plaza location also confirms it was an inland city, as the Laws of the Indies indicated that in coastal cities the plaza should be near the river or port. There is another building very similar to the Church and Convent of San Francisco found in Cayastá, so it is assumed Concepción had at least two Christian temples. At the western end, two very significant structures were found: an iron smelting site and a dump, the latter showing signs of pre-dating Concepción.

== History ==
=== Foundation ===
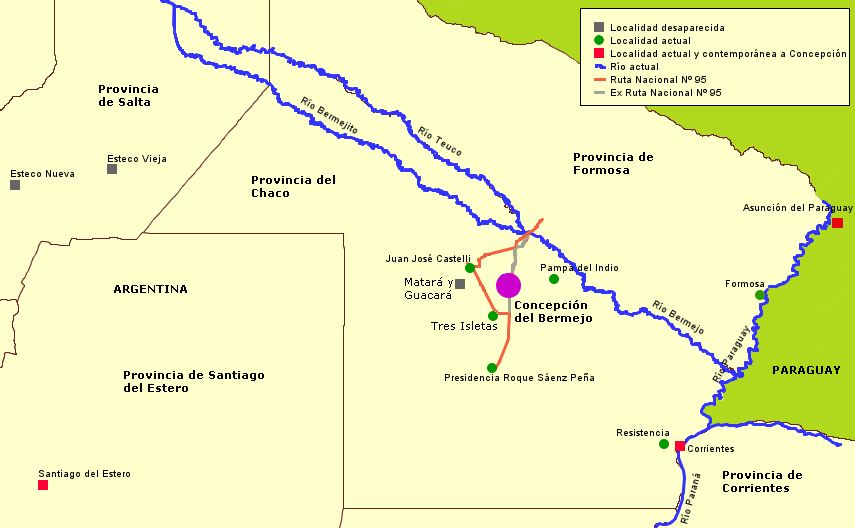
Map of Concepción del Bermejo according to the current political division.

The needs to occupy the Gran Chaco, defend Asunción from indigenous raids, and connect that city with Talavera de Esteco—and through it to the rest of the Spanish cities in northwestern Argentina—combined to promote the idea of founding a city in the territory of the belligerent Chaco indigenous people. There had already been entries into the Bermejo territory commanded from Asunción, such as the one in 1583 against the Guaycurues, so it was logical that the enterprise be organized from Asunción itself. It was also common in that era for capital cities of governorships to try to expand their jurisdiction, taking advantage of population surplus, and granting pioneers new lands and the prosperous encomienda system with the natives found in the incorporated territories.

As precedents for Concepción, there were two requests for city creations in this untamed region. The first in 1566, when three residents of Asunción asked permission from the Crown for the creation of several cities, including one on the banks of the Bermejo River. Then in 1569, the Adelantado Juan Ortiz de Zárate received the order to found two towns between Charcas and Asunción. Ortiz died before fulfilling the mandate, but Juan de Torres de Vera y Aragón married his heiress daughter, inheriting the adelantazgo and the founding order. He appointed Juan de Garay lieutenant governor, who founded Buenos Aires and Santa Fe de la Vera Cruz, but died before reaching the founding in Chaco lands. His successor Juan de Torres Navarrete finally sent Alonso de Vera y Aragón y Calderón to execute the order.

Alonso de Vera y Aragón (nicknamed Cara de Perro due to a bad gesture) was by then an experienced captain and knowledgeable about the natives inhabiting the place. In mid-March 1585, he set out for the Bermejo after recruiting his troop, composed according to his own words of 135 harquebusier soldiers, much ammunition, 1000 horses, 50 yokes of oxen, and more than 300 cows; such a large expedition is considered one of the most numerous to depart from Asunción for founding a city, and was surely composed mostly of mestizo population. In this sense, many of them may have been attracted by the legend of the Laguna de las Perlas, so called for containing oysters that produced fine pearls, believed located near the right bank of the Bermejo River. Several contemporary testimonies attest to its existence, demystified only in the 18th century, highlighting a work by the Asunceño Rui Díaz Guzmán who claimed that a group called Ohoma brought them to Asunción. Alonso de Vera described that he did not take long to travel the river's coasts, after which he founded on April 14, 1585 La Concepción de Nuestra Señora. Alonso de Vera expressly indicated in the founding act that the city could be moved to a better site, although there is no evidence that this happened. In turn, the pioneer recounted how the same local inhabitants who had affronted him on the way, and whom he scared with firearm shots, showed themselves submissive and respectful, and even their caciques were present at the founding ceremony. On the other hand, archaeological evidence suggests that the foundation was carried out on a pre-existing indigenous town.

Vera y Aragón fulfilled all the proper steps of the foundation, erected a cross, marked the town limits with his sword, planted the justice roll, and even appointed the members of the first Cabildo, among whom Hernando Arias de Saavedra stood out. He also granted lands, plots, and estancias and placed the chapel under the advocacy of Our Lady of the Rosary. Finally, he marked the jurisdiction of the new city, which extended to the vague limits of the distant cities surrounding it: Talavera de Esteco, Santiago del Estero and Salta to the west, Asunción and Charcas to the north, and Santa Fe to the south. Although there is no documentation to support it, it is natural to assume that the region's indigenous people were distributed, an act that was clearly nominal due to these people's lack of predisposition to submission.

The city's limits were more precisely demarcated by Hernando Arias de Saavedra in 1598, when he was already governor of Asunción. He marked the Asunción limit as a line between the Bermejo and Pilcomayo rivers up to 8 leagues before the Paraná and Paraguay rivers, whose bordering lands were reserved for the governorship's capital. To the south it reached the limits of Corrientes. Thus, the entire Southern Chaco and part of the Central Chaco came under its jurisdiction.

Founding act:

(...) I found and settle a town in the site of the said Bermejo River, which city is titled and called La Concepción de Nuestra Señora, which said city and settlement borders with all the borders and terms on one side the terms of the city of Asunción and Santa Fe and Santiago del Estero and cities of Talavera which is Esteco and with terms of the city of Lerma called Salta and city of La Plata and all the other terms that are and were in its district and roundness for now and forever and in the meantime that His Majesty orders otherwise which seems to be better and good site where the people can be settled and there is much wood and fishing and hunting and waters and pastures for the sustenance of the settlers and of the cattle and for the perpetuation of the said city with many lands and estancias attached to it which is to distribute and give to the settlers and neighbors of it as His Majesty commands by his Royal Cedulas: which said city I name, found and settle in the name of God and of His Majesty and of the said lord Adelantado (...)

=== Boundary issue ===
Immediately after the foundation, Alonso de Vera assured having explored about 30 leagues upstream, reaching a town of encomiendas of neighbors from Talavera de Esteco, known as Matará, as recorded in a letter sent to the Bishop of Tucumán in October of the same year. Months later, Alonso de Vera went westward until meeting another town of peaceful indigenous people called Guacara, who were also encomended to neighbors of Talavera de Esteco. These neighbors fled to their city, and from there claimed Asunción's interference in their encomiendas to the Real Audiencia of Charcas on December 10, 1586, initiating a boundary conflict between the Governorate of Tucumán and the Governorate of the Río de la Plata and Paraguay. The Chaco lands had not been clearly assigned to any governorship, and the fundamental reason for the dispute was not the quality of its lands or natural resources (poor in themselves), but the peaceful indigenous population found in Matará and Guacara, presumed to greatly serve local development through the income from their encomiendas. The Audience commissioned the Governor of Tucumán Juan Ramírez de Velasco to determine if Concepción was within his jurisdiction, and if so, to expel Vera y Aragón. Velasco went to Concepción with that intention but found the founder's firm determination not to abandon the city.

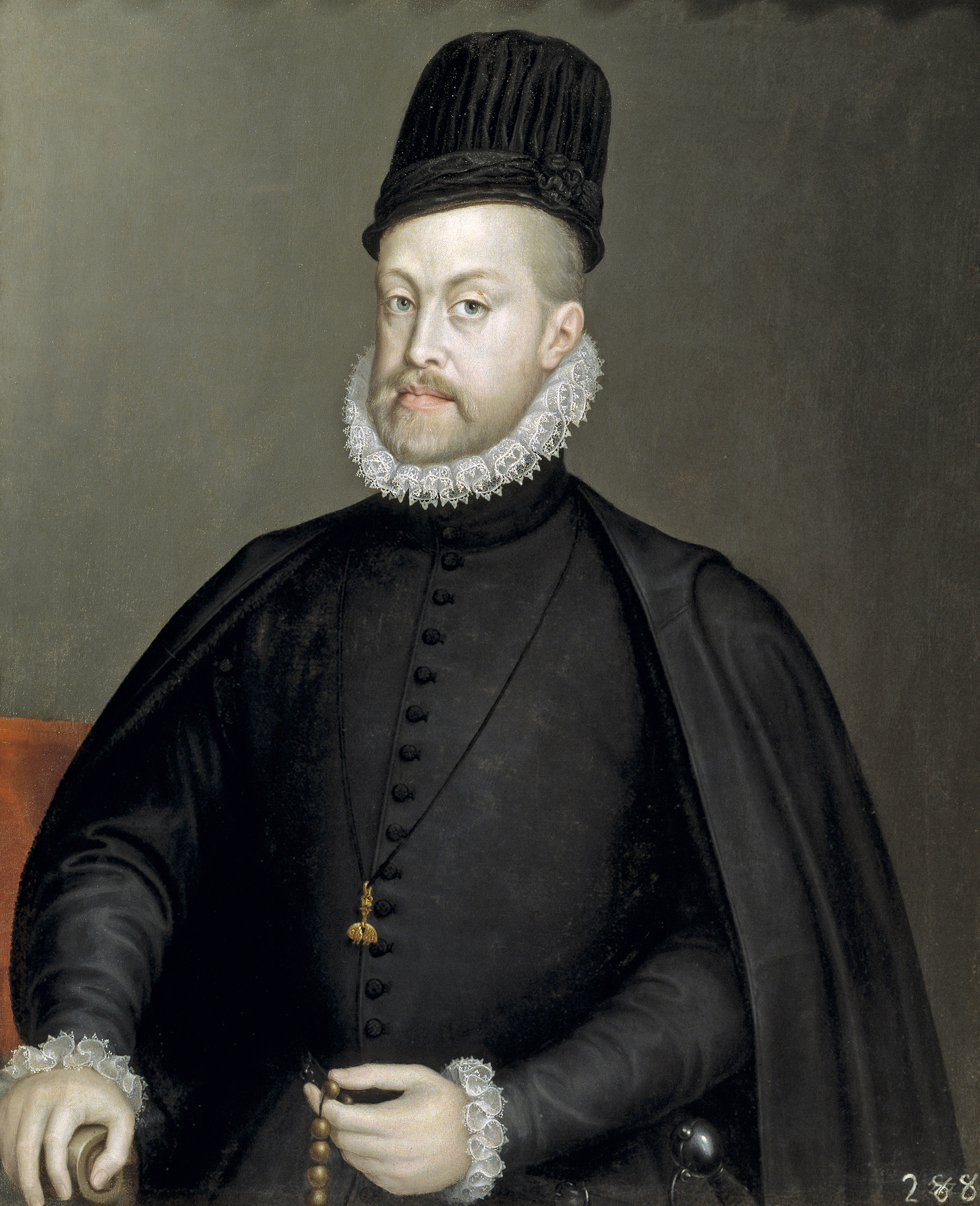
Philip II of Spain ruled in the dispute between Concepción and Esteco regarding the ownership of the Matará and Guacara encomiendas.

Alleging that the Audience had no jurisdiction in this matter, Vera y Aragón managed to have the dispute transferred to the Council of the Indies, the highest judicial authority in Spanish America. In 1590, Juan de Zumárraga was appointed as an expert in geodesy to give his report. The conflict was partially resolved with a Royal Cedula of June 22, 1592, which maintained the status quo of both populations, emphasizing the indoctrination of the indigenous people in each place and the maintenance of both towns. The issue was addressed again by Francisco de Alfaro in 1613, who also failed to discern to which governorship Concepción should be attributed.

The dispute was truly settled in 1617, the year the Governorate of the Río de la Plata was divided into two: the Governorate of Paraguay and the Governorate of Buenos Aires, with the latter gaining jurisdiction over Concepción. Thus, the later extinct city did not fall under the orbit of the Tucumán people who claimed it nor of the Asunceños who had created it.

Both Philip II and his successor Philip III acted considering that resolving the dispute in favor of Asunción or Tucumán could endanger Concepción's fragile existence, as the tension levels between both cities feared an escalation of violence; this explains the first non-definitive ruling and the second, which did not grant either power over Concepción. Part of the population then began slowly returning to Asunción, possibly demoralized by the dispute resolution that disregarded the sacrifices made by the Asunceños and also by the greater comforts and security found in their origin city; on the other hand, the aid arriving from Asunción was never replaced by Buenos Aires, which saw no profit in maintaining a distant city outside its communication routes with Lima. Thus, the jurisdictional change intended to preserve the locality's life had the opposite effect; 1,500 kilometers from the capital and without safe communications, Concepción was left at the mercy of Chaco indigenous harassments.

Another consequence of the ruling assigning Concepción to Buenos Aires was that during the boundary issue over the Gran Chaco, the Southern Chaco remained as Argentine territory almost unquestioned.

=== City life ===
The town's history can only be partially reconstructed due to the scarcity of documentation. For example, some population data are known: in 1609 there were 70 Spanish neighbors and 25 encomenderos, in 1621 there were 85 neighbors and 120 women, in 1628 there were already 100 neighbors, a population surpassed only by Buenos Aires in this governorship. In 1611, during a visit by Governor Marín de Negrón, the encomended indigenous people were censused: 399 in Concepción plus another 921 in Matará. Negrón was succeeded by Captain General Francisco González de Santa Cruz, an Asunceño creole of outstanding performance, brother-in-law of Hernandarias and brother of Jesuit missionary Roque González de Santa Cruz. In 1622, just under 1,500 indigenous people were counted, distributed in Matará, Guacara, and Concepción itself. In turn, Alonso de Vera estimated about 20,000 indigenous people in the surroundings. The main encomendero was the founder Alonso de Vera, succeeded by his widow Isabel de Salazar upon his death in 1605. However, the mistreatment given by her led Governor Hernandarias to deprive her of half her encomienda, ruling that the excluded encomienda be used by the Royal Treasury. The mistreatments to the aboriginals were so many that in 1612 Francisco de Alfaro declared in Santiago del Estero Ordinances that annulled the granted encomiendas. These ordinances were approved in 1618 and made known only in 1621. Despite good intentions, the elimination of encomiendas meant economic ruin for the city, which depended largely on this system. The natives not only abandoned tasks but returned to the forests and their warrior practices, with consequent increase in insecurity in the town.

In 1588, only 3 years after the foundation, the Spaniards were already negotiating the foundation of a new city in the area, to be called La Nueva Estepa. Although the purpose was never fulfilled, this act is clear evidence of the economic importance of the Asunción-Concepción-Tucumán route. Concepción had become from its beginnings a mandatory passage in cart traffic between Asunción and Tucumán, benefiting from the shortening of distance. Local production—mainly consisting of linen, cotton, wax, hemp, and to a lesser extent cattle, though this damaged crops—also benefited from this traffic. Much of this production was indigenous manufacture, especially from the Matará encomienda. In any case, the lack of market for surplus production and difficulties importing due to the Spanish monopoly regime affected economic development. Documents generally speak of a prosperous city; there are also some contrary voices, though belonging to citizens who lived in richer regions of Spanish America—such as the Peru.

There were various attempts to evangelize the indigenous groups, of which only the Matará people were docile. Priest Barzana did commendable work learning the Toconoté language of the Matará and recording its grammatical structure and some words. Priest Añasco did the same with the Quiroquí, Abipón, and Lule languages. This work allowed them to evangelize the entire Matará population; however, with the rest of the tribes, this skill was not enough to achieve better coexistence. Only Matará and Guacará had a doctrine priest, clearly insufficient for the large native population settled around Concepción. The founder Alonso de Vera is also said to have founded a reduction east of the locality with the Ohoma group, known for living around the Laguna de las Perlas, who later became fierce adversaries of the Spaniards.

Attacks were constant, as was their cause: few neighbors, indigenous resentment over the encomienda system, and the warrior culture of the Guaycuru nations inhabiting the area. In 1592, the lieutenant governor of Concepción, Francisco de Vera y Aragón y Torres Lasarte, was assassinated along with his entourage when visiting the Mogosna aboriginal encomienda; the attack was avenged with relief from Asunción led by Alonso de Vera y Aragón and another from Corrientes led by Alonso de Vera y Aragón "el Tupí"'—at that time three homonymous relatives governed the cities of Asunción, Concepción, and Corrientes—which also prevented plans to besiege Concepción. In 1595, a forced recruitment of indigenous people to take them to Asunción by Lieutenant Gabriel de Moreira provoked a general uprising. This time it was Alonso de Vera who had to quell the rebellion. Alonso de Vera also recounts in a trip to Buenos Aires that at night horses and service indigenous people were stolen from the town. In 1599, two assaults on Concepción occurred, which succeeded only due to the tenacious defense of its inhabitants. It is known that the cities of Asunción, Corrientes, and Santa Fe sent aid in 1599, 1621, and 1629. Criminal acts were not exclusive to Concepción; the Matará and Guacará encomiendas were also targets of attacks and internal struggles; one of the best-known episodes is the massacre caused in 1621 by Alonso Pacsi, one of Matará's two caciques, who, feeling aggrieved by another group of encomended people, got them drunk and had more than 40 killed. Pacsi was executed on the gallows for this mournful act. Góngora's investigation allowed knowing other atrocities committed by the cacique, from which not even women or children were spared.

=== Tragic end ===
Several factors interacted leading to a harsh end for what had been the second city of the governorship. The jurisdictional change in 1617 would be a death blow to the town; its ungracious lands, indigenous belligerence, and lack of fluvial communication soon left it isolated and at the mercy of fate. Indigenous resentment had worsened from offensive wars carried out in 1614 as reprisal for an attack on Concepción and Asunción itself. Some political conjunctures that influenced the failure of immediate reoccupation attempts after Concepción's abandonment should not be overlooked either.

The final attack began in 1631, when a tribal coalition devastated the town of Matará, Concepción's main support. The few survivors took refuge in Concepción, and Lieutenant Governor Antonio Calderón went out to defend his city with forty men. Despite good armament, the troop was insignificant against the more than 2,000 indigenous people opposing them, with the governor and half his troop perishing. Concepción's residents, through their Cabildo, then understood the situation was untenable and undertook a painful march on foot to Corrientes, which fortunately for them was not attacked by the raid, as it was in ample condition to do so. Analysis of the remains allowed concluding that Concepción was burned and immediately reoccupied by an aboriginal community.

An account by Captain Manuel Cabral written from Corrientes reports that the best possible aid was attempted, but the residents who managed to flee should give infinite thanks to God for being alive.

Governor Francisco de Céspedes had placed General Juan de Garay, son of the founder of Buenos Aires, in command of a party destined to strengthen its population, punish, and pacify the rebelled indigenous people; it is assumed that prior to Matará's devastation, outrages had increased there, as Céspedes had no knowledge yet of the aboriginal town's destruction. This act was one of Céspedes's last government decisions, whose successor Pedro Esteban Dávila was already appointed since April 1629, though he would assume only on December 26, 1631. Garay and his small troop of militiamen stopped shortly after leaving Santa Fe upon learning of Matará's events and finding their leader very ill. The small number of the campaign likely influenced the decision to face an escalation foreseen as greater than initially estimated.

Shortly after assuming, Dávila appointed General Gonzalo de Carbajal in front of about 30 soldiers to whom those posted in Santa Fe should be added. Upon arriving in Santa Fe, Carbajal learned of Concepción's abandonment, after which he swiftly went to Corrientes, where he verified that the population to defend was already refugeed there. After vainly waiting 22 days for new instructions from Dávila, Carbajal returned to Santa Fe resolved to undertake the recovery campaign of Concepción, but nature prevented it. The rainy season caused rivers to swell and numerous estero to cross to reach the destination, so Carbajal resolved to suspend the entry awaiting spring, a more suitable season for the mission.

Concepción's fall was not an isolated event; between 1631 and 1632, the city of Santiago de Guadalcázar was also abandoned, founded in 1626 at the confluence of the Bermejo and Zenta rivers by Martín de Ledesma Valderrama as capital of the Chaco Gualamba province. The ephemerality of this city prevented the new province's realization, failing almost simultaneously two of the most concrete attempts at occupation of the Southern Chaco. Concepción's fall was the first great defeat the Chaco nations could inflict on Spanish expansionism. The indigenous people had already overcome the initial shock of the Spanish arrival, and with mastery of the horse they put white populations in the Río de la Plata on alert for approximately a century, when an astute policy change addressed the indigenous problem not from repression but from evangelizing work.

=== Reoccupation attempts ===
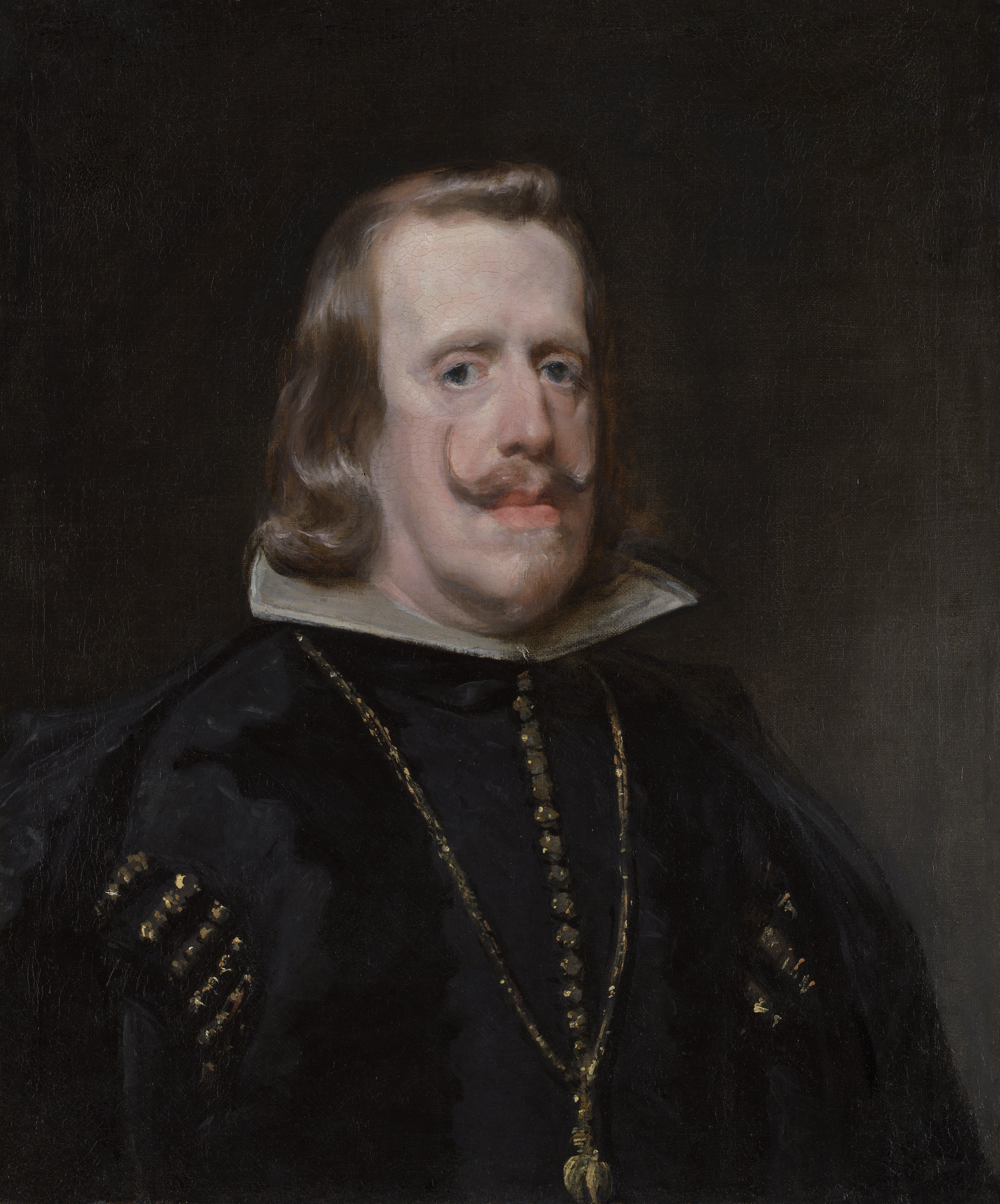
Philip IV of Spain offered a special reward to whoever managed to repopulate Concepción, but it was not enough to recover the historic bastion in Chaco territory.

Although the promise of special rewards issued by the king to whoever managed to reoccupy Concepción was very important in encouraging several repopulation attempts, there were other motives. First, the Governorate of Buenos Aires had only 4 cities (Buenos Aires, Santa Fe, Corrientes, and Concepción); abandoning one was clear negligence by the ruler. On the other hand, the Matará encomienda generating about 250 pesos annually to its encomendero had passed to Governor Dávila after Isabel de Salazar's death in 1630; it is likely, therefore, that the governor was motivated by economic desire, and as we will see, Dávila attempted several times to personally lead the expedition.

When Carbajal returned to Santa Fe awaiting a more propitious season for entry into the Chaco, he was notified to go down to Buenos Aires, which he did not without surprise. In the capital, he found Dávila already preparing to personally direct the operation. However, the Cabildo requested Dávila to desist, as his presence was necessary in Buenos Aires. It was the second time the Cabildo asked Dávila not to command the operation himself (the previous was the prior year); the governor again complied but appointed his own son, Pedro Dávila Henríquez de Guzmán, to lead the campaign. As was customary in the era, neighbors had to generously contribute to the expedition, which left in 1634 with about 40 men. Two years later, despite reaching Concepción, Dávila's son returned without fulfilling the main purpose. The campaign leader had ordered his subordinates to gather as many wild cows as possible, which he sold for his own benefit in Santa Fe. Thus, greed truncated a great operation for which Buenos Aires neighbors contributed again with effort.

For the third time, Governor Dávila attempted to lead the action, to the point of decreeing who would be his lieutenant in the capital during the journey, and for the third time his presence was required, this time due to fear of Dutch attacks on the port of Buenos Aires. In this situation, the campaign was left under Captain Amador Báez de Alpoín, joined by locals Juan de Garay in Santa Fe and Manuel Cabral de Alpoín in Corrientes. The expedition left in 1636 and also failed, a fate shared the following year by a new campaign under Bernabé de Garay.

After the series of reoccupation failures, Dávila attempted to defend his management against accusations of inability to repopulate the city, and it is noted in the writing that he either did not know the real situation or deliberately falsified it, taking advantage of the lack of knowledge of the real situation in Spain. The last mission to the Chaco was during the government of Mendo de la Cueva y Benavides (1637-1640), but it contented itself with making them retreat (the natives) without coming to blows.

Meanwhile, the Concepción residents mostly settled in Corrientes, a city where they endured many needs. Father Ruiz had said upon the residents' arrival that it was painful to see those men, yesterday so prosperous and today miserable begging for alms. To this must be added an act of striking greed and lack of consideration, when field master Manuel Cabral de Alpoín prohibited exiles' entry to Corrientes fields to slaughter feral cattle, alleging they were his and his relatives' property; not content with that, he demanded payment of a quarter of each already slaughtered animal. Pedro Dávila had to intervene in 1637 in favor of Concepción's refugees, ordering permission for them to slaughter feral cattle until a place for settlement was found.

When there was no more hope of repopulating the abandoned city, a Royal Cedula of 1645 dissolved Concepción's Cabildo, and its inhabitants were considered full residents of Corrientes. The reduced aboriginals who participated in the exodus were destined to Santa Fe and Corrientes, some forming part of the foundation of Santa Ana de los Guácaras.

== Km 75 Ruins ==
As mentioned, the only target that managed to rediscover Concepción was Captain Juan José Acevedo, who by order of Francisco Gavino Arias and aided by local indigenous people rescued in 1776 the bell of the extinct city to place it in La Cangayé. Although this information was recorded in his diary, the detail remained ignored until 1946.

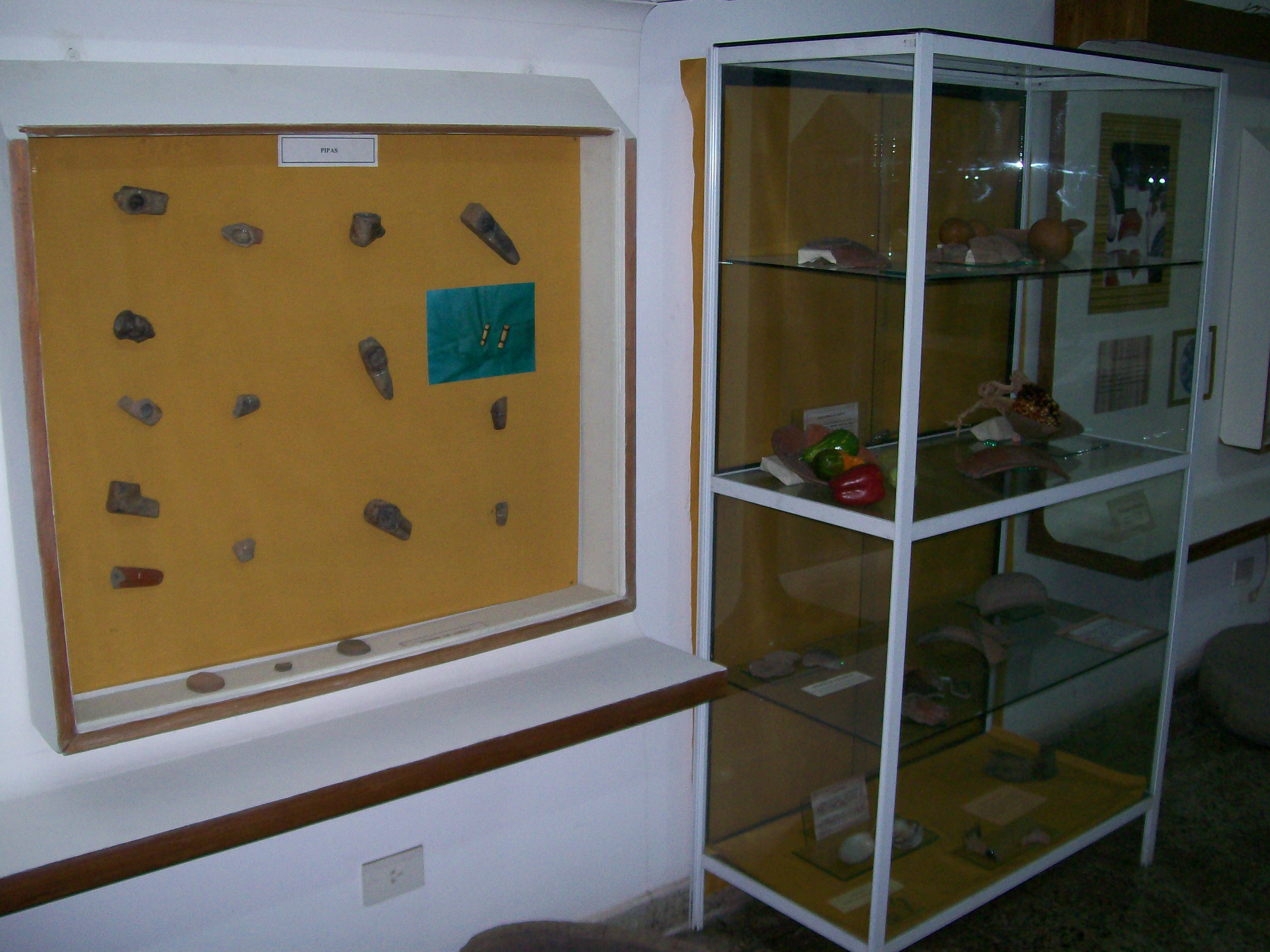
Pipes, ceramic remains, and other objects corresponding to Concepción del Bermejo exhibited in the Regional Anthropology Museum of Resistencia.

The definitive discovery occurred almost fortuitously on September 17, 1943, when Alfredo Martinet—a great connoisseur of the region—discovered remains of pottery while traveling the former National Route No. 95 connecting Presidencia Roque Sáenz Peña with Fortín Lavalle. Interested in the find, he ventured into the thick forest where he found octagonal-shaped elevations. Martinet intuited the discovery was important and communicated it to Ana Biró de Stern, who then directed the Natural Sciences Museum of Corrientes. Martinet and Biró quickly cleared and conducted the first excavations at the site, finding remains of ceramics, iron, lead, among other objects, attracting local community attention.

Marcelo Montes Pacheco published the find in a local newspaper that same year, and in December participated with Martinet in an expedition to the ruins, then venturing into what is known as Pampa Tolosa Ruins, later proven to correspond to the Guacara encomienda. Biró, Martinet, Montes Pacheco, and others published their first impressions, with the majority opinion (among whom Biró and Alumni stood out) that the remains could not be related to Concepción del Bermejo due to its distance from the river giving it its name; Montes Pacheco was the only one at that time defending the later proven correct position; other less consistent theories were also spread, such as relating the find to Guacara remains or a military fort.

In 1946, Monsignor José Alumni, a priest based in Resistencia who had followed everything related to Concepción with singular enthusiasm, found in the General Archive of the Nation the original diary of Colonel Francisco Gavino Arias's expedition to the Chaco. With it were two unknown plans of La Cangayé and San Bernardo de Vértiz. These plans allowed identifying other recently discovered ruins as corresponding to La Cangayé. This find and the references to Concepción in it enhanced the value of the Km 75 ruins, strengthening the thesis that they corresponded to the remains of the Spanish city. In 1954, another joint expedition was organized between Martinet, Alumni, Stern, and Ise, who after careful though limited exploration found materials and constructions supporting this opinion.

At the end of that same year, a fundamental work for full understanding of the find began, when Alfredo Martinet in collaboration with his son engineer Héctor Martinet cleared the place and surveyed it. The result was the preparation of the plan of all the ruins, whose magnitude and arrangement indicated they could be nothing but a colonial city; as Concepción was the only city of this era, the conclusion was evident. For Alumni, this plan meant confirmation of the hypothesis, and he published in 1958 in a local newspaper and then in the national La Prensa the assertion that the Km 75 Ruins correspond to Concepción. Alumni's death left unfinished a book in which he would detail his impressions.

=== Systematic work ===
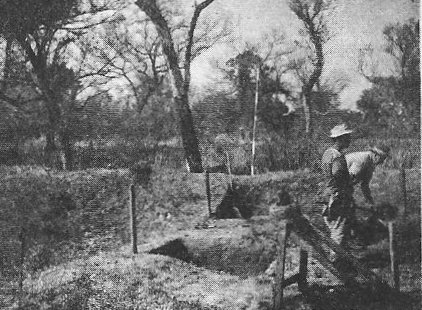
Start of excavation works in sector M of the Km 75 Ruins, by the National University of the Northeast.

According to Alumni himself, the excavations were not planned or carried out with due technique. The creation in 1958 of the Faculty of Humanities at the National University of the Northeast (UNNE) allowed this institution to undertake systematic surveying of the site, in line with the regional dimension the young university sought. On two occasions, a commission from this Faculty traveled to survey and photograph both the site and exhumed material. After resolving the legal aspect with a provincial decree reserving the place for investigation, the Faculty installed housing facilities and a caretaker, whose job was to prevent depredations in search of treasures that had already occurred. Works formally began on May 28, 1965.

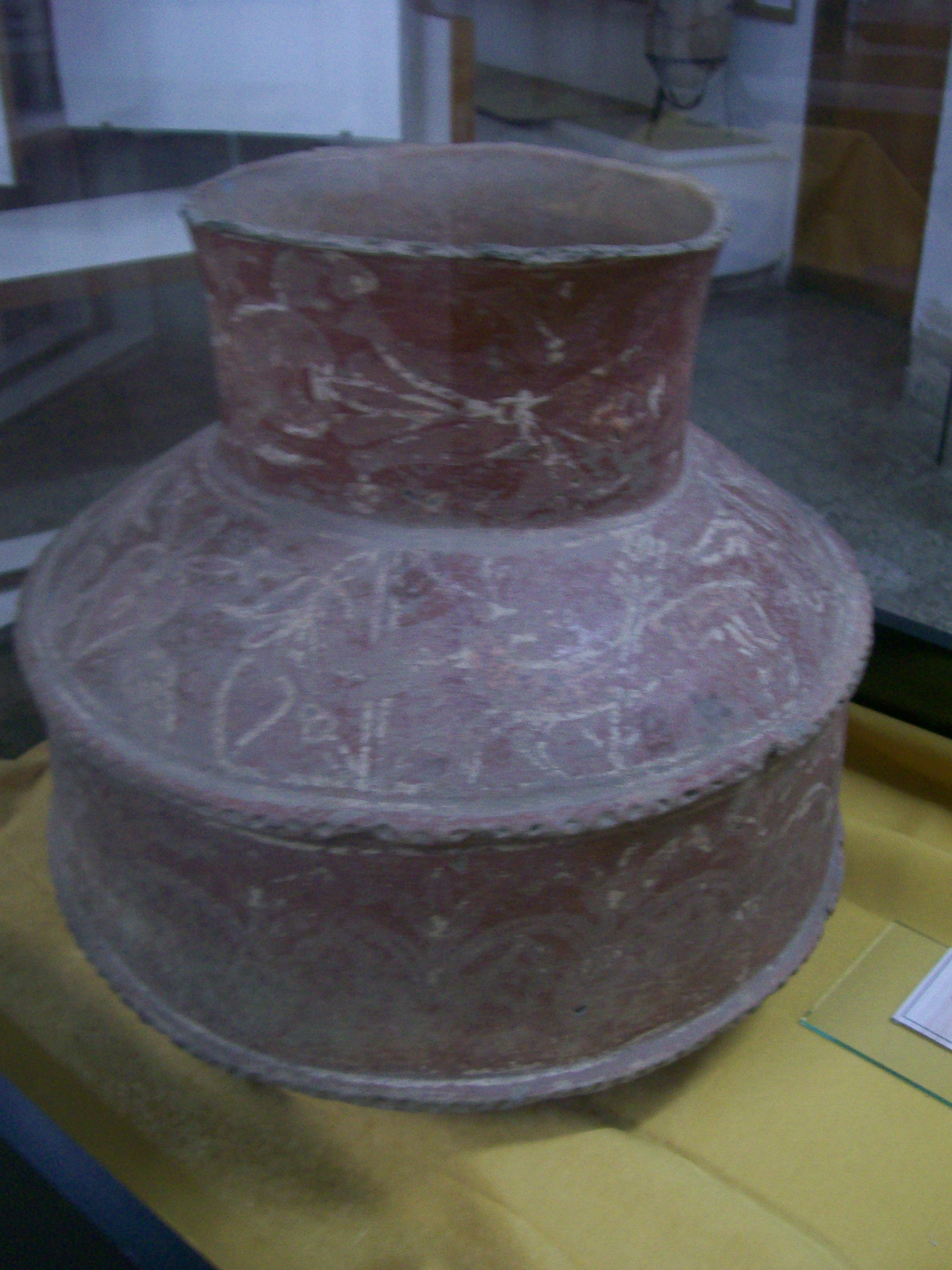
Indigenous-manufactured jar with Christian motifs found in the ruins, one of the few complete objects extracted in the excavation.

Investigations were led by Eldo Morresi, from the Institute of History of that Faculty, who proceeded to formal work on the sites, also using more precise dating techniques; in 1970 he corroborated Martinet's conclusion regarding the origin of the Km 75 Ruins. Morresi and his team found various types of objects, primarily divisible into Hispanic, Indo-Hispanic, and indigenous. Regarding the first, there were not many finds, explained by the economic crisis in Concepción's last 10 years when it came under Buenos Aires administration. A great variety of indigenous ceramic remains were found, including some of Guaraní extraction, probably created by aboriginals of this ethnicity who arrived with the Spaniards at the foundation. Among found objects we can mention candlesticks, bullets, human remains buried according to Hispanic norms of the era, nails, brass, a bronze bell, a rare indigenous-manufactured jar with Christian motifs, millstone, iron smelting slag, and bone remains of fish, bivalves, and other animals. Many objects found by Martinet, Alumni, and Morresi are exhibited in the Anthropology Museum of the Faculty of Humanities at UNNE.

The site and surroundings continue to be subject to archaeological and cultural investigations by UNNE, as shown by over 600 pieces found in 2007 and the 2006 publication of a study on the Toba population of Cabá Ñaró—closest to the ruins—that examined how Concepción is remembered by this community.

== National Historic Place ==
By Decree 16.482/43, the National Executive Power declared the site where the city of Nuestra Señora de la Concepción del Bermejo existed a National Historic Place, locating it at 26º 41' south latitude and 59º 56' west longitude from Greenwich and about 150 kilometers upstream from the Bermejo River's mouth into the Paraguay. These coordinates marked a place erroneously believed to correspond to the city. The error was corrected by another National Decree, No. 631/1979. It clarifies that based on the conclusions of the book Las Ruinas del Kilómetro 75 y Concepción del Bermejo published by the Faculty of Humanities at UNNE, the site located at kilometer 74.5 of National Route No. 95 starting from Presidencia Roque Sáenz Peña northward is declared a National Historic Place.

== Toponymy ==
The city was founded with the name Concepción de Nuestra Señora, in obvious allusion to the Immaculate Conception of Mary, mother of Jesus. As was usual at that time, the residents themselves altered the original denomination, with the most common form in documents fully denominating it Concepción de Buena Esperanza. Already then, two short variants were imposing: Concepción del Bermejo and Concepción, the most used by contemporary governors and to this day the most utilized.

The addition Bermejo presumed its location on the banks of the homonymous river, the only notable natural feature in the entire Southern Chaco plain. Contrary evidence allowed interpreting this differently, assuming Bermejo was more a reference to this entire Chaco region, a sort of natural province.

The only known official document issued by city authorities corresponds to 1587 and calls it Concepción de la Buena Esperanza, with the suggestive absence of the term Bermejo; from this it could be interpreted that the addition of Bermejo was after this date. Francisco de Alfaro in a 1613 letter to the king recognizes it as Concepción de Buena Esperanza, called del Río Bermejo; a letter from the Bishop of Tucumán—who had authority over Concepción—speaks of the jurisdiction of Buena Esperanza del Río Bermejo; the two national decrees declaring the ruins a National Historic Place call it Nuestra Señora de la Concepción del Bermejo. This last is an example of the various name combinations given to Concepción, among which we also find Concepción de Nuestra Señora del Bermejo and Concepción de Nuestra Señora del Río Bermejo.

In honor of this city, the current locality and municipality of Concepción del Bermejo was named, located about 80 km southwest of the original, and even farther from the current Bermejo River course.
