= Guadalcázar =

Guadalcázar may refer to:

- Guadalcázar, San Luis Potosí, México
- Guadalcázar (Córdoba), Spain
- Villa de Santa Catalina de Guadalcázar del Valle de Moquegua, Peru
- Santiago de Guadalcázar, Argentina
- Diego Fernández de Córdoba, Marquis of Guadalcázar
