= Maipú Department =

Maipú Department may refer to:

- Maipú Department, Chaco, Argentina
- Maipú Department, Mendoza, Argentina
