= Ilex rubra =

Conservation status
- Least Concern (IUCN 3.1)

Scientific classification
- Kingdom: Plantae
- Clade: Tracheophytes
- Clade: Angiosperms
- Clade: Eudicots
- Clade: Asterids
- Order: Aquifoliales
- Family: Aquifoliaceae
- Genus: Ilex
- Species: I. rubra

Binomial name
- Ilex rubra S.Watson

Species of plant

Ilex rubra is a species of flowering plant in the holly family Aquifoliaceae, native to northern and western Mexico. An evergreen tree 4 to 10 m (13 to 33 ft) tall, it is found above 1,000 m (3,300 ft) in coniferous forests. Hardy to USDA zone 7b and with large dark red fruit, it is rare in gardens but deserves to be more widely cultivated. It is used as a street tree in Guadalcázar, Mexico.
