= Metalclad =

American waste management company

- Company type: Private company
- Industry: Waste Management
- Founded: 1933
- Headquarters: Fullerton, California
- Key people: David Trueblood (President)
- Services: asbestos abatement

Metalclad is an American landfill management firm founded in 1933 and based in Fullerton, California.

== Guadalcázar landfill ==
Metalclad purchased a landfill site in Mexico's city of Guadalcázar from a Mexican company, Coterin, in 1993. Coterin had planned to develop a hazardous waste landfill on the site but were unable to secure the necessary permits from the local government. Metalclad was able to obtain land use permits from the Mexican federal government, but local governments did not respond to the application for a building permit, neither allowing nor denying the site. The mayor of the city was opposed to the landfill because of the amount of toxic waste in it and the threat to the local water supply.

In 1992, prior to Metalclad purchasing the site, a review by Mexican environmental officials found that over twenty thousand tons of hazardous waste had been improperly dumped. The officials agreed to allow the dump to continue processing and to issue permits on the condition that Metalclad cleaned up the improperly dumped materials.

After Metalclad purchased the landfill, locals complained that they were getting sick, developing aggressive diseases, and that their water was polluted. The main water well was about 60 yards from the stream flowing through the location where Metalclad was dumping its material. A 1994 environmental study by commissioned by the new governor found that the dump was appropriately sited (located) and could continue operations.

In 1995, the Mexican Secretariat of the Environment and Natural Resources authorized the operations of the landfill with the condition that Metalclad agree to clean up the improperly disposed hazardous materials. Local authorities then denied the building permit. A court case determined that the permit denial meant that Metalclad was required to cease operating the site. In September of 1997, the Governor of San Luis Potosi issued an Ecological Degree stating that the landfill site was included in a protected natural area, ceasing operations.

In 1997, Metalclad sued the Mexican Government for damages under Chapter 11 of NAFTA for $90 million and was awarded by an ICSID arbitration panel $16.7 million. This award was later reduced to $15.6 million, by review in the courts of British Columbia (the jurisdiction where the NAFTA hearing was held) due to a recalculation of the applicable interest period.
