= Fortín Lavalle =

Coordinates: 25°41′S 60°13′W

- Municipality and village
- Interactive map of Fortín Lavalle
- Country: Argentina
- Province: Chaco Province
- Time zone: UTC−3 (ART)

Fortín Lavalle is a village and municipality in Chaco Province in northern Argentina.
