= Tres Isletas =

- City
- Location in Argentina
- Coordinates: 26°21′S 60°25′W
- Country: Argentina
- Province: (Chaco Province) Chaco
- Department: Maipú
- 2nd level Municipality: Buenos Aires
- Founded: 1937
- Elevation: 89 m (292 ft)

Population ((2001 census [INDEC]))
  - Total: 24,747
- Time zone: UTC−3 (ART)
- CPA Base: H 3703
- Area code: +54 3732
- Climate: Cfa

Tres Isletas is a town in Chaco Province, Argentina. It is the head town of the Maipú Department.

Tres Isletas (meaning 3 little islands) was founded in 1939. The local economy is based on agriculture, beekeeping and food production.
