= Maipú Department, Chaco =

Maipú Department
- Department
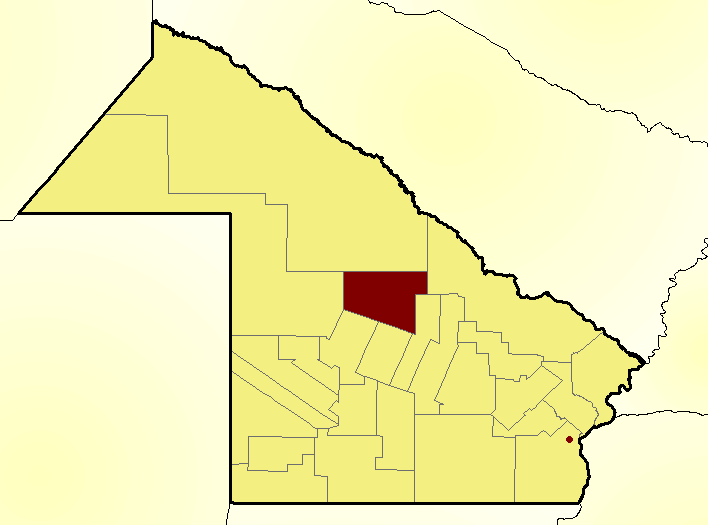
- Location of Maipú Department within Chaco Province
- Coordinates: 26°21′S 60°26′W
- Country: Argentina
- Province: Chaco Province
- Head town: Tres Isletas

Area
  - Total: 2,855 km^{2} (1,102 sq mi)

Population
  - Total: 24,747
  - Density: 8.668/km^{2} (22.45/sq mi)
- Demonym: Maipuense
- Time zone: UTC-3 (ART)
- Postal code: H3705
- Area code: 03732

Maipú is a central department of Chaco Province in Argentina.

The provincial subdivision has a population of about 25,000 inhabitants in an area of 2,855 km^{2}, and its capital city is Tres Isletas, which is located around 1,250 km from the Capital federal.

== Settlements ==
- Pampa Caba Naro
- Pampa Florida
- Tres Isletas
