= Santiago de Guadalcázar =

- Municipality and town
- Interactive map of Santiago de Guadalcázar
- Country: Argentina
- Province: Salta Province
- Time zone: UTC−3 (ART)

Santiago de Guadalcázar is a town and municipality in Salta Province in northwestern Argentina.
