= Guadalcázar, San Luis Potosí =

Coordinates: 22°37′N 100°24′W

Guadalcázar
- Municipality
- Location in Mexico Guadalcázar (Mexico)
- Country: Mexico
- State: San Luis Potosí
- Demonym: (in Spanish)
- Time zone: UTC−6 (CST)

Locator map of Guadalcázar Municipality – in San Luis Potosí, Northeastern Mexico.

Guadalcázar is a municipality in the Mexican state of San Luis Potosí.

== Geography ==
Guadalcázar municipality is north of the municipality of Cerritos. Most of the residents live in two towns within the municipality, El Quelital and Buenavista. It is among the biggest municipalities of Mexico (municipios) located in the state of San Luis Potosí.

== History ==
The town was one of the many colonial establishments founded by Spanish explorer and Viceroy of New Spain, Juan Córdoba de Guadalcázar, Marquis of Guadalcázar, in 1620. In the decades following its founding, Guadalcázar flourished as a wealthy town. Its main exports were coal, iron, silver, and other industrial materials. This was because of the many hills surrounding the town were rich in mineral deposits. After the minerals were exhausted by 300 years of mining the hills, in the early twentieth century, the population slowly diminished.

=== Mexican Revolution ===
After the Mexican Revolution, the privately owned mines were taken over by the new government.

== Modern economy and culture ==
Guadalcazar changed little for nearly half a century in the latter 1900s, until the Mexican government recently recognized the churches that were built during the Spanish Colonial period as being of great architectural and historical importance. Since then, media attention has been increasing for Guadalcazar, making it a tourism destination.

The re-population of Guadalcazar has also increased due to many American miners looking for precious minerals. Minerals have been located deep within hillsides, and the mining process is beginning once again. Despite this change in attention, Guadalcazar's population has hovered steadily between 500 and 900 residents, the majority being elderly.

=== Events ===
The main times of tourism are during the summer months beginning in June, and during the winter around Christmas.

Winter

In the winter, visitors come for the religious ceremonies that take place throughout the town. On Christmas Eve, virtually the entire community gathers at the town square to march throughout the town and outskirts saying Roman Catholic prayers. On Christmas Day, a large festival is held celebrating the birth of Jesus.

The majority of visitors are from the United States, as the younger generations of original local Mexican families have moved for various reasons. This leaves 'U.S. American' impressions on the local population, resulting in a unique blend of cultures.

Summer

During the summer, there are festivals held in honor of the town and to celebrate the season. This event is commonly known as "La fiesta del Rancho" or the Ranch Festival.

== Government ==
The small government is functional yet corrupt, so the community relies on its population to form non-narcotic trafficant's? for seats of power.
