= Libertador General San Martín Department, Chaco =

Libertador General San Martín Department
- Department
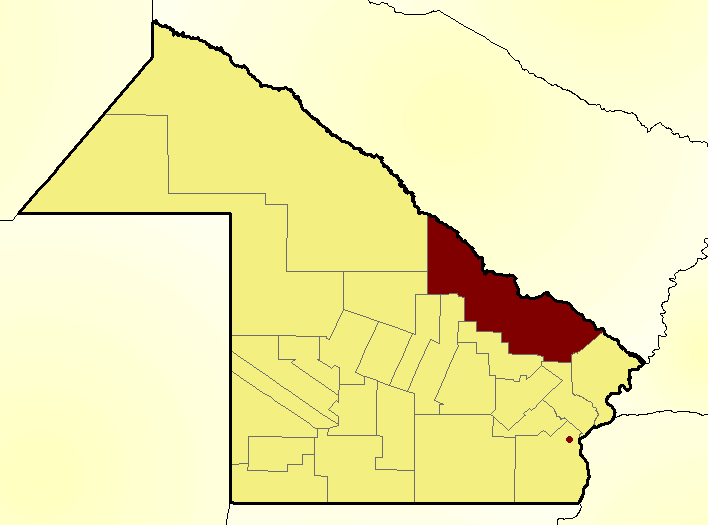
- Location of Libertador General San Martín Department within Chaco Province
- Coordinates: 26°32′S 59°20′W
- Country: Argentina
- Province: Chaco Province
- Established: 1934
- Head town: General José de San Martín

Area
  - Total: 7,800 km^{2} (3,000 sq mi)

Population
  - Total: 54,470
  - Density: 7.0/km^{2} (18/sq mi)
- Demonym: Sanmartinense
- Time zone: UTC-3 (ART)
- Postal code: H3509
- Area code: 03725

Libertador General San Martín is a department located on the north eastern border of Chaco Province in Argentina.

The provincial subdivision has a population of about 54,500 inhabitants in an area of 7,800 km^{2}, and its capital city is General José de San Martín, which is located around 1,125 km from the Capital federal.

The department and its cabecera (capital) are named after José de San Martín, the General that led Argentina to victory over the Spanish Empire in the Argentine War of Independence.

== Settlements ==
- Ciervo Petiso
- General José de San Martín
- La Eduvigis
- Laguna Limpia
- Pampa Almirón
- Pampa del Indio
- Presidencia Roca
