= Murder of Cecilia Strzyzowski =

Enforced disappearance in Chaco, Argentina

- Location: Resistencia, Chaco, Argentina
- Date: 2 June 2023
- Attack type: Femicide
- Deaths: 1
- Victim: Cecilia Marlene Strzyzowski
- Perpetrators: César Sena, Emerenciano Sena, Marcela Acuña, Gustavo Obregón, Fabiana González, Gustavo Melgarejo
- No. of participants: 6
- Charges: Murder
- Verdict: Guilty

On 2 June 2023, Cecilia Marlene Strzyzowski, a 28-year-old Argentine woman, went missing in Resistencia, Chaco. She was later found to have been murdered in an act of femicide. Among the main suspects and defendants are her partner, César Sena, along with his parents Emerenciano Sena and Marcela Acuña, who were candidates in the 2023 provincial elections in Chaco Province. Sena and Acuña make up the "Sena Clan," a family of social leaders with great local political influence as well as strong ties with the Government of Chaco Province, including then-current governor Jorge Capitanich. This case has attracted attention at the provincial and national level and has been reported in the international media and by Amnesty International.

In addition to Sena, Gustavo Obregón and Fabiana Gonzáles, political leaders close to Acuña, were also charged, as were Gustavo Melgarejo, the Senas' landlord, and his partner Graciela Reynoso. The investigation was under the supervision of prosecutors Jorge Cáceres Olivera, Jorge Fernando Gómez, and Nelia Vázquez of the Special Prosecutor's Office for Gender Violence No. 4 of the Public Prosecutor's Office.

The verdict was delivered on 15 November 2025. Six defendants were convicted of murder, while one, Graciela Reynoso, was found not guilty.

== Summary ==
The report for the disappearance of Cecilia Strzyzowski was filed on Tuesday, 6 June, by her mother, Gloria Romero, who had received anonymous information suggesting that something had happened to her daughter. From that moment on, the protocol for the search for missing people was activated and an investigation was initiated by the Prosecutor's Office. According to the security cameras, on 2 June, Cecilia was observed entering the Sena residence, with no record of her leaving, and with the last signal from her mobile phone being at that location. Subsequently, Obregón could be seen in the recordings leaving the home with black bags, which it was presumed could contain the young woman's body. Emerenciano and Acuña got into the vehicle and left the house. The Prosecutor's Team carried out various raids and searches, including of the Sena property, where bone and blood remains belonging to Strzyzowski were found. Melgarejo claimed to have seen the young woman tied and gagged in Emerenciano's truck, and later murdered. In addition, a search was carried out in the Tragadero River, near the Sena home, where crushed human bones and a pendant were found that was recognized by Gloria Romero as belonging to her daughter. All these indications point to the hypothesis of femicide.

According to prosecutors, Strzyzowski was murdered on 2 June between 12:13 and 1:01 p.m. in the Sena house by César Sena and his parents. Then, Gustavo Obregón and Fabiana González helped the traces disappear, and at 7:00 p.m.: 27 César Sena and Obregón carried the body to take it to Campo Rossi where it was dismembered and cremated and finally the remains were thrown into the Tragadero River.

For their part, the defense of César Sena, Gustavo Obregón, Fabiana González, Griselda Reinoso and Gustavo Melgarejo presented a request to appeal the arrest warrant and the prosecutors' indictment, asking that the case be categorized as "forced disappearance," arguing that "it is not proven that Cecilia died" since her body was not found.

In relation to the case, an investigation has been initiated for laundering and evasion of financial assets to the Sena family. During one of the raids, $6,058,190 Argentine pesos were found in César Sena's home without justification. According to the report of the Federal Prosecutor's Office of Chaco, Emerenciano and Acuña perform functions in two organizations: the "Doctor Saul Acuña Foundation" and the "Emerenciano Sena Foundation", as well as in the "Emerenciano Labor Cooperative Limited." Regarding their political influence, the Sena maintain close ties with the government of Chaco, which is reflected in the execution of public works, the management of social plans and the deliveries of housing. In addition, it has been revealed that the Sena family has received a transfer from the provincial government of more than $141 million pesos, even after Strzyzowski's disappearance was made public.

The case took place near the time of the 2023 Argentine provincial elections. In these elections, Emerenciano Sena, Gustavo Obregón, Marcela Acuña and Fabiana Gonzáles made up the list of the Unique Socialist Party (PSU) within the official list of the Frente de Todos. Emerciano and Gustavo were going to be pre-candidates for deputies, with Marcela Acuña for mayor and Fabian Gonzales for Resistencia councilor. However, due to the scandal related to the disappearance and social repudiation, the Chaqueño Front decided to cancel the PSU's applications.

On 18 June, the provincial elections were held. The media agreed that the murder case influenced the results, which resulted in a victory for the opposition to the government.

== Background ==
=== Cecilia Strzyzowski ===
Cecilia Strzyzowski
- Born: Cecilia Marlene Strzyzowski; 3 August 1994; Argentina
- Disappeared: 2 June 2023; Resistencia, Chaco, Argentina
- Status: Missing for 3 years, 4 months and 30 days
- Parent(s): Gloria Romero; Miguel Strzyzowski

Strzyzowski was born on 3 August 1994. She was an administrative employee at a health center and the owner of a cafeteria. She lived in her aunt's house with her partner, 19-year-old César Sena. According to the testimony of Gloria Romero, Strzyzowski's mother, the relationship between the two began in December 2021 through the dating app Tinder. However, problems arose in the relationship, especially due to César's mother's resistance toward the relationship. In addition, possible coercive control by César over Cecilia's movements through WhatsApp and the possession of weapons by César, who claimed to be politically persecuted, have been mentioned.

On 16 September 2022, Cecilia and César married, but four days later they began divorce proceedings, allegedly influenced by César's mother, who did not support the relationship. The young couple handed out invitation cards for a wedding party to be held on 23 December, though the divorce decree came out two days before and the celebration was postponed indefinitely. Cecilia's mother was unaware of this divorce at the time of her daughter's disappearance. Cecilia and Cesar continued their relationship, however, and were seen together regularly. Cecilia's mother stated that to her, César seemed like an excellent partner, and expressed surprise at the version she learned from a friend of Cecilia, who alleged that on 3 May 2023, César had physically attacked Cecilia. According to this same statement, César Sena was medicated and hit his mother on one occasion. Cecilia's psychologist — who last treated her two days before her disappearance — corroborated the versions of gender violence and that César took psychotropic drugs.

=== The Sena family ===
César Sena is the son of Emericano Sena and Marcela Acuña, a family with an outstanding career in the social and political sphere, being leaders who maintain close ties with the government of Chaco Province, which is reflected in the execution of public works, the management of plans social services and housing deliveries through organizations such as "Fundación Doctor Saul Acuña", "Fundación Emerciano Sena" and the "Cooperativa de Trabajo Emerenciano Limitada". In 2023, they received a transfer of 141 million Argentine pesos from the provincial government. The family also has a high net worth and several properties that are currently under investigation for evasion of financial assets. Among their assets are two pieces of land located in Colonia Benitez, 10 kilometers from the city of Resistencia, whose value amounts to 130 thousand dollars. On one of these plots is the family residence where the murder of Cecilia Strzyzowski is presumed to have occurred.

Emerenciano Sena's active participation as a social leader took place in the '90s when he founded the Movement of Unemployed Workers (MTD) together with leader Ramón "Tito" López. Later, after the breakup of the MTD, Emericano partnered with Sergio Schoklender and Hebe de Bonafini, owner of the Sueños Compartidos cooperative, to build homes on occupied land. However, due to judicial and financial problems, the project failed. In 2020, the national government decided to transfer those same lands to the government of Chaco, who subsequently transferred them to Emerenciano. In 2009, the Saúl Andrés Acuña Foundation was created to carry out the projects of Emerenciano and Marcela Acuña.

In the 2023 Argentine provincial elections in Chaco, Emerenciano Sena, Gustavo Obregón, Marcela Acuña and Fabiana Gonzáles made up the list of the Unique Socialists Party (PSU) within the official list of the Frente de Todos. Emerciano and Gustavo were going to be pre-candidates for deputies, with Marcela Acuña for mayor and Fabian Gonzales for Resistencia city councillor. However, due to the scandal related to the disappearance and social repudiation, the Chaco Front decided to cancel the application to stand.

== Details of the disappearance ==
On 1 June 2023, Cecilia had a video call with her mother Gloria Romero and told her that she was going on a trip to Ushuaia with her partner César Sena. The stated reason was for a job opportunity. The job opportunity as the reason for the trip was confirmed by Cecilia's psychologist. That same afternoon Cecilia was seen leaving her aunt's house in Resistencia with César Sena, wearing light grey sweatpants, a dark grey jacket, and grey sneakers with pink details. In turn, Sena carried a partially empty red backpack. According to a relative of Cecilia, she seemed nervous, and when questioned about the lack of luggage, César responded that he would "buy clothes in Buenos Aires". In Resistencia the average temperature in June was 15 °C and in Ushuaia it was 2 °C. According to her mother they should have taken a plane to Buenos Aires from Corrientes to make the trip. Strzyzowski and Sena left together in a white Toyota Hilux pickup truck. However, the precise details of its whereabouts and the circumstances surrounding its disappearance have not yet been clarified.

On 5 June, two anonymous people posing as investigative agents approached Cecilia's family and provided information from a neighbour in the Emerenciano neighborhood who suggested that something had happened to her. Despite the family's attempts to communicate with Cecilia by telephone, they only received written messages in response saying that her cell phone had been broken. Upon requesting a voice message, they received old audio, which caused further concern. Later, Cecilia's aunt Mercedes, exchanged messages with César, who stated that he was in Ushuaia with Cecilia, but that she had gone out with her lover. Subsequently, communication was completely broken and no further contact was made.

The next day, a security camera captured Cecilia entering the Sena house at 9:15, but her departure was not recorded. The cell signal on Cecilia's phone was activated for the last time in a field near the Tres Horquetas area near Resistencia.

Investigators were unable to find evidence of the existence of the alleged trip, suspecting that Sena had deceived Cecilia and her mother, Gloria Romero, to commit the crime.

== Investigation ==
Once the disappearance was reported on 6 June, the Prosecutor's Office immediately activated the protocol for missing people and femicide. In addition, it intervened in the Criminal Intelligence Department (Search for Missing or Missing Persons Division), Complex Investigations Department (Homicide and Capture Division), Complex Investigations Department (Cybercrime Division), Fight Against Human Trafficking Department; Complex Investigations Department; Press Division; Police Agreement; Highway Police Directorate (Verifications Division). Also, it requested reports from geo-connections, telephone companies, WhatsApp, Instagram and Facebook.

On 8 June, the Provincial System of the Ministry of Security and Justice of Chaco together with the Federal Person Search System were working to search for Cecilia. The secretary of Human Rights and Gender for the province, Silvana Pérez, requested that the investigation be carried out with a gender perspective, sending a notification to the federal Ministry of Women, Genders and Diversity. The Argentine Federal Police, Airport Security Police, Argentine National Gendarmerie and Argentine Naval Prefecture were alerted, so that controls could be carried out at road posts, airports, bus terminals, and provincial and international borders to find Cecilia's whereabouts. That same day, Cecilia's cell phone was requested to be unlocked and the requested reports were entered into Telecom Personal and Flow.

On 12 June, the Public Prosecutor's Office created a specific prosecutorial team to investigate the disappearance, made up of Jorge Fernando Gómez and Nelia Velázquez.

=== Femicide investigation ===
César Sena was called to testify on 6 June in court. When he arrived, he had scratches on his neck that were captured by the cameras of the journalists who were covering the news. The prosecutor maintained that the state of his hands would be compatible with a strangulation manoeuvre toward the victim. After César testified as a witness, the prosecutors detected contradictions in his testimony, so prosecutor Jorge Cáceres Olivera requested to search the Senas' home. After the inspection, police found a butcher's saw, a machete, ammunition, stains of blood, and bone fragments. Two days later, Olivera asked to classify Cecilia's disappearance as femicide. Furthermore, one of the hypotheses supported by the prosecutor is that Cecilia's cell phone was activated for the last time in one of the pig farms in the Sena estate.

Magali Fernández Leyes, a member of the Emerenciano Foundation, voluntarily provided evidence about the Sena changing their cell phones on 2 June, one day after Cecilia's disappearance. She also claimed to have a WhatsApp audio from Marcela Acuña's sister, Patricia, where Patricia expressed her fear over the possibility that Gustavo Melgarejo, the landlord, "saw how the pigs devoured Cecilia." On 13 June, the prosecution changed the circumstances from missing person to an alleged femicide.

On 13 June, the Prosecutor's Office summoned Melgarejo, Fabiana González and Gustavo Obregón, although Melgarejo was the only one who presented his statement. Both Gonzáles and Obregó refused to cooperate with the investigation due to lack of evidence, according to their lawyer Juan Fernando Díaz. On 14 June, Melgarejo, along with his partner Griselda Reynoso, declared having seen César Sena and Gustavo Obregón arrive at the Sena home, along with Cecilia on 4 June, who was sitting and having lunch in the back seat of one of the vehicles. It is alleged that she was subsequently murdered and her body was buried in Puerto Tirol.

After the confession, a search was carried out in the town, but no evidence was found. Fabiana González's house, located in Villa Itatí, and Obregón's apartment in Villa Centenario were searched. The possible clothes that Cecilia would have worn in the Sena house were also seized.

After a search in the Emerenciano neighborhood, remains of a suitcase with wheels, clothing, and accessories that had been incinerated were found. All the seized items were brought to the attention of the Strzyzowski family and subjected to tests at the Institute of Medicine and Forensic Sciences of the province. On 23 June, Gloria Romero recognized the objects as Cecilia's belongings, as well as a pendant and rings that she wore. On 3 July, the presence of Cecilia's burned remains in the Sena patio was confirmed. Later, genetic analysis revealed that the blood found in a room in the Sena house matched the DNA of Strzyzowski and blood traces detected on a mattress.

Armando Cabra, former official of the Ministry of Security of Chaco, became the legal defender of Emericiano Sena and Marcela Acuña. Previously, the lawyer in charge of representing both was Juan Carlos Saife, who presented his resignation after learning of certain communications between Acuña and Emerenciano in which it was stated that they had made an arrangement with a judge. Subsequently, Ricardo Osuna had assumed the defense of the members of the Sena family, but after the request of the prosecution, he resigned from representing Emerciano and Acuña and stayed with César Sena.

Ricardo Osuna is the current defender of César Sena. Osuna said that he would not make any statement and made it clear that his defense will be based solely on what is in the file, which he considered to contain indications and presumptions. Previously, the lawyer in charge of Sena's defense was Juan Díaz, who also represented Fabiana González and Gustavo Obregón, but he resigned due to "irreconcilable differences" after the addition of new evidence to the case. The next day, Sena began to be represented by two official defenders: Patricia Aleksich and Martha Karina Paz until Osuna's appointment.

=== Money laundering ===
On 9 June, a raid was carried out at the home of Emerenciano Sena and Marcela Acuña, where approximately 6 million pesos in cash were found without justification, which led to an investigation of money laundering and tax evasion. The Federal Justice declared its incompetence in the case and it was referred to the Federal Court of First Instance 2 of Resistencia, headed by Ricardo Mianovich; The prosecutor in the case is Patricio Sabadini. César Sena's former lawyer, Juan Díaz, who judicially represented the Emerenciano Socialist movement, indicated the money came from a program for carrying out works, and the transfer was made for the purchase of materials.

=== Arrangement with judges ===
Marcelina Sena tried to visit her brother Emerenciano Sena at the police station where he was being detained. During the visit, two pills and a letter were seized from him, in which an alleged arrangement was discussed with Judge Rosalía Zózzoli of the Guarantees Court of the Prosecutor's Office No. 3. The aim was to have Emerenciano obtain house arrest, feigning a discharge of blood sugar. The note also mentioned César Sena's lawyer, Ricardo Osuna, who disclaimed any responsibility. The Attorney General formed a Special Prosecutor's Team to investigate the letter.

=== Arrests ===
On 9 June, prosecutor Jorge Oliverio requested the arrest of Emerenciano Sena and Marcela Acuña and issued an international arrest warrant for César Sena, who was a fugitive after being summoned on 7 June; Acuña justified that César was in Corrientes studying medicine. Finally, on 10 July at 11:00 p.m, Acuña was transferred to the Family and Gender Violence Department. César Sena was arrested the same day.

On 11 July, the Sena's landlord Gustavo Melgarejo was arrested under suspicion of having collaborated in disposing of Cecilia's body. He was arrested alongside his partner, Griselda Reynoso, whose identity was kept secret from the public until her statement to the prosecutor's office. On the same day, Fabiana González was also arrested along with Gustavo Obregón as suspected conspirators.

On 13 June, Fabiana González's sister, Daiana González, was arrested, but she was released without charge.

=== Imputation ===
Below are the allegations related to the cover-up of the femicide of Cecilia Strzyzowski that the Prosecutor's team carried out based on the evidence and testimonies collected during the investigation:

- Cesar Sena, Cecilia's partner: homicide triple aggravated by the bond, by the premeditated collaboration of two or more people and by having been carried out in a context of gender violence.
- Marcela Acuña and Emerenciano Sena, César's parents: homicide aggravated by the premeditated collaboration of two or more people as co-authors.
- Gustavo Melgarejo, Sena's landlord and his partner Griselda Reinoso: aggravated concealment as a secondary participant.
- Fabiana González, collaborator and associate of the Acuña and Sena family: aggravated homicide as a necessary participant.
- Gustavo Obregón, Gonzáles' partner: homicide aggravated by the premeditated participation of two or more people as secondary participants.

== Repercussions ==
=== Protests ===
The first demonstration to demand justice for Cecilia Strzyzowski took place on 9 July 2023, at Plaza 25 de Mayo in Resistencia, in front of the Government House. On the same day, protestors requested the release of César Sena who was detained at the police station, which ended in an occupation of the building; For this reason, fences were installed at the police station and the prosecutor's office.

The next day, another rally was held in the same place, also including the Judiciary. On 14 June, a torchlight march took place in Resistencia, under the motto "Let's remember Ceci with the light that characterizes her" and "Truth and Justice for Cecilia Strzyzowski", describing it as a massive march according to the media. On 2 July, another protest was held on the Chaco-Corrientes bridge.

=== Political impact ===
The 2023 Argentine provincial elections were overshadowed by the disappearance of Strzyzowski. In the primary elections of the Chaco provincial elections, Emericiano Sena and Obregón were going to be pre-candidates for provincial deputies, while Acuña and Gonzáles intended to stand for mayor and councilor of Resistencia, respectively. The four were part of List 652 PSU "United Socialists", within the Chaco Front; but, after the scandal of the case, they were excluded from the candidacies. After the results of 18 June, the media agreed that the case had an influence on the results, which resulted in a victory for the opposition to the government.

On 26 June, a preliminary investigation into money laundering against the Senas was carried out based on the cash found during the first raid, and banking secrecy was released both about them and about a foundation they managed.

On 27 June, newspaper versions reported on an alleged call from Emerenciano Sena to Governor Capitanich in which he had been informed of Cecilia's disappearance before the complaint was made. In the evening the governor held a press conference where he categorically denied this version, showed his support for clarifying the case and defended himself against accusations of sending funds to the Sena family. He in turn recalled that the Sena camp was transferred to them during the administration of Roy Nikisch governor before Capitanich and from another political party. Nikisch later explained that it was within the framework of a project financed by the national government (from the same party as the current governor) and that the sale itself was registered in 2013, in Capitanich's second term.

On 3 July, it was reported that the Saúl Acuña Foundation (managed by the Sena couple) will be dissolved once the intervention ends.

=== Reactions ===
- Jorge Capitanich governor of the Province of Chaco, referred to the disappearance of Cecilia, on 11 June, at an event held by General San Martín, stating that the government will "promote the justice that is necessary" and that "the State "will propose and defend the victims of any violence." On June 14, he held a second conference on the case stating that "we strive for the fact to be clarified and those responsible to pay in prison with the full weight of the law." Later, he expressed "I am horrified by fake news campaigns." (...) "we do not appoint judges by hand". Capitanich's defeat in the election was considered to have "tipped the scale" in the primary due to the case.
- Gabriela Cerruti, presidential spokesperson, stated that "it is essential to know quickly what happened and for law and justice to act with all their force."
- Ofelia Fernández, member of the Buenos Aires City Legislature from Frente de Todos, published: "we need to know what happened to Cecilia Strzyzowski".
- María Eugenia Vidal, PRO deputy, referred in a tweet saying "we demand that the provincial justice system act quickly, without delays, without ifs and buts and without attempts at a cover-up. The political ties of the accused cannot interfere. Impunity is not an option".
- Horacio Rodríguez Larreta, Chief of Government of Buenos Aires asked "that the police investigate thoroughly and that politics not get involved".
- Patricia Bullrich, president of the PRO, accused the national government of not expressing itself about the disappearance and femicide of Cecilia Strzyzowski and compared Emerenciano Sena as "a Miracle Sala de Chaco."
- Juntos por el Cambio, from the Deputies and Senat, requested the presence of Ayelén Mazzina Ministry of Women, Genders and Diversity, to provide information on what actions the Ministry is taking in relation to Cecilia's case.
- The Argentine Association of Prosecutors (AAF) and the College of Prosecutors of the First District expressed "the need to urgently advance in the prompt clarification and showed their support to the prosecutors in the need to urgently advance in the prompt clarification."
- Amnesty International launched a global campaign to the prosecutor's team investigating the case involving activists from more than 160 countries to call for an infestation and an impartial gender perspective criminal process to clarify the facts and convict those responsible.
- The Argentine Journalism Forum (FOPEA) made a statement condemning the attacks that were carried out on local journalists in the context of the investigation of the case.

== Controversies ==
=== Threats and intimidation ===
==== To the family of Cecilia Strzyzowski ====
Gloria Romero, Cecilia's mother, reported to the media that she received a text message stating "We know that you have another daughter" in reference to Ángela Strzyzowski. Also, Cecilia's aunt, Karina Gómez, the lawyer who promoted the case and had signed up as a complainant, was threatened, but after the immediate investigation, she decided to report the case. The Ministry of Security and Justice ordered police custody of Romero and Gómez, including personnel from the Argentine National Gendarmerie and the Chaco Provincial Police.

The lawyer for Cecilia Stryzowski's family, Dr. Karina Gómez, denounced intimidation by Gloria Zalazar, the Minister of Security and Justice of Chaco. She also stated that she has been blocked from the Digital Written Entry System (InDi) and that she suffered electricity and internet outages, in addition to feeling "being surrounded".

==== To journalists ====
While covering the case of Cecilia's disappearance, several local journalists received threats and intimidation from the Government of Chaco, social leaders and anonymous people, including a death threat.

Araceli De Jesús, a journalist from Radio Gualamba, was doing a live broadcast in front of the Third Police Station, where César Sena was summoned on 9 June. De Jesús received physical attacks, intimidation and the breaking of her mobile phone by the Socialist Women in Front movement, one of the aggressors being Fabiana González, who is currently charged in the case. Local Infoqom journalist, Carlos Prette, reported three incidents of pressure and threats that he received in the month of June. In the first incident, a social leader from the Toba neighborhood, Vanesa López, threatened to take away his cell phone if he continued taking photos of her in the anteroom of Governor Jorge Capitanich's office, after which she forced the police officers on duty to expel the colleague from the office. government building. On 13 June, Prette was intercepted by a stranger on a motorcycle who scolded him, saying "Stop messing around with the movement or you're going to have a bad time." Finally, on the 15th, he received an anonymous call on his cell phone and, when he asked his interlocutor to enable the camera to see his face, he refused, saying "no, because I am the one who is going to give you a ticket". He also claimed that his news portal was the victim of a cyber attack, leaving it out of service. Prette reported these events in the Provincial Court of Chaco. The Crónica TV mobile team has also been physically attacked on two occasions and the journalist Alejandro Pueblas from A24 when he was reporting in front of the Sena home.

The Argentine Journalism Forum (FOPEA) made a statement condemning the attacks that were perpetuated against the press. For his part, the national senator for the province of Chaco, Víctor Zimmermann, presented a draft declaration expressing concern about attacks and intimidation against the journalistic sector.

=== Politicization of the case ===
The case of Cecilia Strzyzowski has generated a political impact, since the main suspects of the alleged femicide are the piqueteros leaders, Emerenciano Sena and Marcela Acuña, and five other people around them, who were candidates of the Chaco Front, the alliance that leads the Governor Jorge Capitanich.

The gubernatorial candidate Leandro Zdero stated that those involved in the murder are political partners of Chaco and accused the provincial government of being complicit. For his part, the lawyer for Cecilia's family, Fernando Burlando, denounced that the crime scene was altered and that the investigation is being hindered by the political ties of the accused. Capitanich rejected the "political use of the case" and "the fake news campaigns", and asked that those responsible pay in prison to the full extent of the law. He also assured that his management will do everything necessary to clarify the incident. rom the Secretary of Human Rights and Gender of Chaco, Silvana Pérez, denounced that "there is a lot of irresponsibility and political use, which only adds pain to the victim's family." He also referred to when the Ministry of Women added Cecilia's mother to the Urgent Support Program, which provides families of victims of femicide with initial financial aid for immediate expenses, denouncing that this action "was distorted with the complaint that 'They offered the mother money.'

From the women's reference group that includes national feminist networks, officials and legislators issued a statement expressing solidarity with the family of the missing young woman with the warning that "What matters is Cecilia," repudiating the use of politicisation. The statement included the signatures of Estela Díaz, Juliana Di Tullio, Kelly Olmos, Anabel Fernández Sagasti, Paula Penacca, Blanca Osuna, María del Carmen Feijoo, Mónica Macha, Mara Brawer and María del Carmen Bianchi, among many others. The federal judge of San Isidro, Sandra Arroyo Salgado, spoke about the investigation and made a comparison of the case of the death of prosecutor Alberto Nisman in terms of the treatment given to him by the political leadership. Furthermore, he questioned "the politicization" of this type of causes and considered that they "harm" their progress: "[There is] a parallel with the Nisman case, (...) like the action of [Jorge] Capitanich trying to silence, when "Differences of opinions enrich us.".

In relation, the provincial legislator of the Chaco Front, Claudia Lorena Panzardi, generated outrage for her statements by stating that "Cecilia Strzyzowski was an adult woman who made her own decisions" and "wrongly chose that family" referring to the Sena. The opposition accused her of blaming the victim for her disappearance and of defending the ruling party.

== Chronology ==
=== June 2023 ===
- 3 to 4 June: César Sena participated in political campaign events. His mother, Marcela Acuña, was a pre-candidate for mayor of Resistencia, and his father, Emerenciano Sena, was a pre-candidate for provincial deputy. Both were candidates for Governor Jorge Capitanich 's Chaco Front. Emerenciano Sena has been called the "Chaco Sala Miracle", due to his relationship with the current provincial government. The Sena family received public funds from the Capitanich government until the day they were arrested, at least 141 million pesos, through the "Doctor Saúl Acuña" foundation. On Saturday the 3rd, at an event in Colonia Elisa, a photograph of César Sena was taken, in which scratch marks can be seen on his neck.
- 3 to 5 June: Gloria Rome tried to communicate with her daughter, who was used to video or audio calls, but only received text messages in response, since "the camera had broken".
- 5 June: at 8:00 p.m. the sister received a visit from two men who identified themselves as investigation agents, who told her that a person from the Emerenciano neighborhood reported that he knew Cecilia and that "he knew that something had been done to her." Given this event, they tried to communicate with Cecilia with an audio message in which they explained that they would file the complaint if she did not answer. They could not contact Cecilia or Sena again from that number, but Cecilia's aunt did contact César who told him that her niece was in Ushuaia and he was working. Then César Sena himself told him that Cecilia had run away to Buenos Aires with a lover. The version that she had run away with a lover was published by a relative of César Sena on the 7th.
- 6 June: a truck moved items from the Sena house to two homes in the Emerenciano neighborhood. Hours later, Gloria decided to file a report about her disappearance. Family and friends started a campaign on social networks to find her.
- 7 June: in the morning the case had already reached local media, where the search for Cecilia's whereabouts was stated. From the first moment it was reinforced that she had last been seen getting into a truck with César Sena. Screenshots of the messages between the family and César Sena were also distributed. Marcela Acuña would declare that on Friday her son and Cecilia had a fight, but it was something unimportant.
- 8 June: César was called to testify at the Police Station. He was accompanied by his mother and a large group of protesters from the social organization led by his parents. During the wait, a journalist was attacked by the delegation that accompanied Sena, who was asked to leave her and her cell phone was thrown to the ground. Marcela Acuña declared to the media that she was struck by the fact that the mother had not communicated with them, and that there was an interest in exposing the case through the media to affect the campaign of the official front for the provincial election that would take place 10 days later. She also stated that she believed that Cecilia would appear the day after said election, and that it was all a trap by the prosecutor. The same day, the protesters who were with Marcela Acuña tried to enter the police station while taking a statement from "a colleague" under the excuse that they had her locked up. On the other hand, those close to the victim called for a march in the center of the city to ask for clarification of the case.
- 9 June: César Sena did not appear in court to testify as agreed. so an international arrest warrant was issued and his parents' house was raided. During the raid, blood stains and $5 million were found, which would later lead to a new case for tax evasion. The prosecution ordered the arrest of César Sena's parents, an order that was carried out on the same Friday night. That same night, a protest was held again asking for clarification of the incident.
- 10 June: Raids were carried out on several Sena properties and skeletal remains and blood stains were found in a rural house. In the operation, the agents seized ammunition and knives. After noon César Sena surrendered to the police, meaning that the case no longer had any fugitives. Fabiana González was also arrested, who is considered to be Emerenciano Sena's right-hand man and his wife, and who had participated in the attack on a journalist two days before. Because Cecilia's cell phone signal had been activated for the last time in the area known as Campo Rossi, a search was carried out with negative results in the pig farming establishment that the family has in that rural area. During the same operation, they arrested Gustavo Melgarejo, the establishment's landlord, who had a previous complaint for violence against women.
- 13 June: the classification of the case changed to femicide and the detainees were charged as co-authors of the crime of "aggravated homicide". On the same day, the provincial Electoral Court excluded Emerenciano Sena and Marcela Acuña from participating in the election, but there was no time to reprint the ballots, so Sena and Acuña appeared as paper candidates.
- 14 June: New searches were carried out in search of the victim's body or remains, with negative results. That same day, lawyer Juan Díaz, who had assumed the defence of César Sena, resigned his sponsorship "due to irreconcilable differences," after the addition of new evidence to the file. The next day, the accused began to be represented by two official defenders: Patricia Aleksich and Martha Karina Paz; and would express to the prosecutor, through a handwritten letter, the fear for his physical integrity.
- 17 June: two forensic anthropology specialists from the Judicial Branch of Córdoba arrived in Resistencia to collaborate in the examination of the skeletal remains found in the rural house of the Sena family. The results were classified as "doubtful", given their deterioration due to exposure to the sun, water and being burned. The local Justice Department indicated that there is nothing clearly human in the samples analysed. That same day, a new raid was carried out, mainly focused on a Sena family junk shop, in which more bone remains were found that will be sent to Córdoba for analysis.
- 18 June: five hours before the opening of the primary elections in the province, a group of investigation tasks in the Emerenciano neighborhood found remains of a suitcase with wheels, clothing and accessories that had been incinerated. All the seized items were brought to the attention of the Strzyzowski family and subjected to tests at the Institute of Medicine and Forensic Sciences of the province.
- 20 June: after the statement of one of those suspects – Fabián Obregón – the Tragadero River was searched and crushed bones and a cross-shaped pendant were found in it that are presumed to belong to Cecilia. Obregón not only indicated the place to rake but directly accused César Sena. On the same day, Emerenciano Sena had requested to testify for the first time and distanced himself from the fact, indicating that he "was not there".
- 21 June: Marcela Acuña gave evidence for the first time. She denied any connection to the incident although she claimed to have seen a lump in a room that she assumed was a body. She left there "scared" and sent a message to Obregón to determine if it was a body, to which she states that she answered yes. She also said that she saw César scratched and that he explained to her that she had gotten into a fight with his partner. On the same day, a Catholic priest who went to see César at her request, said that according to César "my mother never loved Cecilia, but I never imagined that she could go to this extreme"; Such statements were not made under the secrecy of confession, said the priest. The federal judge of Resistencia Zunilda Niremperger lifted the fiscal, banking and financial secrecy of César Sena, Emerenciano Sena and Marcela Acuña. The Ministry of Government of Chaco began an audit to evaluate the legal and economic situation of the Foundation of "DOCTOR ANDRÉS SAÚL ACUÑA".
- 22 June: a police raid was carried out on the homes in the Emerenciano neighborhood where items had been moved from the Sena house days after Cecilia's disappearance. During the raid, a mattress, a bed and a backrest among other objects were seized.
- 23 June: Gloria Romero recognized a pendant and rings that she wore as her daughter's belongings. For his part, the prosecutor reported that in addition to the known scratches on César Sena's neck, there were marks on his hands, and that they could be compatible with a strangulation manoeuvre towards the victim.
- 24 June: expert reports were carried out with georadar and a trained dog in the search for human remains under a newly paved street in the aforementioned Emerenciano neighborhood.
- 25 June: a massive march was held in Plaza 25 de Mayo. Gloria Romero stated that people should not be afraid of political power.
- 26 June: Fabiana González (charged at that time with aggravated homicide as a necessary participant) testified for almost four hours, the longest statement up to that time, however no relevant data was obtained from it. Instead she limited herself to detailing her routine on 2 June.
- 27 June: experts reported that they had analysed the bones they had found in the Tragadero River and determined them to be human, although it was not possible to determine sex, precise age or cause of death because they were "multi-fragmented and charred". The same day it was determined that there was DNA on the mattress seized on 22 June.
- 28 June: The charge against the four defendants who are not from the Sena family—Gustavo Obregón, Fabiana González, Gustavo Melgarejo and his wife Griselda Reinoso—was changed to aggravated concealment, and their preventive detention was confirmed. The sentences if convicted would be up to 6 years, while the Sena family could have life imprisonment.
- 29 June: the team of prosecutors held a press conference where they reported how they believe the events occurred: the murder would have occurred between 12:13 and 1:01 p.m., which is the time window in which César Sena and his parents were in the house of Santa María de Oro 1460. Reference was made to the fact that César Sena was seen without scratches at 11:00. At 16:52 Gustavo Obregón arrived, and at 17:12 Fabiana González, both to help in the disappearance of traces, with César Sena and Obregón loading her corpse into the trunk of a Hilux truck two and a quarter hours later and taking it to Campo Rossi. On the other hand, they considered it proven that Cecilia was deceived regarding the trip to Ushuaia based on searches ("how to pack a suitcase" and "what can be brought on a flight" among others) that she had done on her cell phone days before. Gustavo Melgarejo claimed to the prosecutors that he had lied when he said he had seen the young woman gagged in a truck and later, César Sena and Gustavo Obregón, would have killed her by throwing her body in a garbage dump. Her lawyer, Mónica Sánchez, stated that Melgarejo lied after a lawyer's request to plant false leads, feeling threatened. The Special Prosecutor's Team (EFE) requested preventive detention for the seven detainees.

=== July 2023 ===
- 1 July: It is reported that seven suspects have been remanded in custody over the murder of Cecilia Strzyzowski.
- 2 July: Hundreds of people march at the General Belgrano Bridge which connects Chaco Province and Corrientes Province, so people from both provinces were able to attend it.
- 3 July: Amnesty International launched an international solidarity campaign which called for justice, and sent a letter to Jorge Cáceres Olivera, the case's prosecutor. It was reported by the media that during a search at the Sena home, traces of blood had been found in César Sena's room, where statements indicated that the victim's body was seen wrapped in blankets, and that a backpack and wallet and the burned remains of a credit or debit card had been found in the yard. During the same day, a handwritten letter from Marcela Acuña was revealed, in which she states that she and her husband are facing a social condemnation for being César's parents, and also alludes to the fact that the preventive detention of both of them is due to political reasons. On the other hand, the Secretariat of Human Rights and Gender requested that the participation of an eighth person be investigated, about whom it did not provide details.
- 4 July: Marcelina Sena attempted to visit her brother Emerenciano and during the event two pills were seized, and a letter was found discussing an alleged arrangement with a judge. The defence of César Sena, Gustavo Obregón, Fabiana González, Griselda Reinoso and Gustavo Melgarejo presented a request to appeal the prosecutors' accusation.
- 5July: It was announced that the eighth person involved would be Gerardo Flores, who cared for animals in Campo Rossi, the same task as the accused Gustavo Melgarejo. Flores, for his part, denied involvement of having gone to the Sena camp. On the same day, the resignation of the Sena couple's lawyer, Juan Carlos Saife, was announced, first only from the defence of Marcela Acuña, and finally from both of them. It was also learned that Ricardo Osuna—who already had the defence of César Sena—would assume the defence of both. It is presumed that the letters from Marcela and Marcelina would have been the trigger for the change of defender.
- 9 July: Armando Cabra took over as lawyer for Emerenciano Sena and Marcela Acuña. Cabra is an official of the Ministry of Security of Chaco who provides advice on matters related to security forums. After the notification, the Ministry irrevocably discharged Cabra from his position.
- 11 July: Genetic analysis revealed that the blood found in a room in the Sena house belongs to Cecilia Strzyzowski, as well as blood traces detected on a mattress found that was later given to a neighbour.
- 13 July: Mariano Sena went to visit his stepbrother, César Sena, who is detained in Penitentiary Prison 1 of Chaco. During the act, police personnel seized a bank withdrawal receipt for one million pesos and a note inside a notebook that was written with invisible ink. The Justice Department, then began an investigation into the receipt to evaluate whether it contained an encrypted message. Emereciano Sena's defence requested house arrest alleging that he suffered from diabetes. The Chaco Forensic Medical Institute later presented a report determining that Emerenciano was in good health. The Guarantee Court No. 2 rescheduled the Emerenciano Sena and Marcela Acuña hearings for 1 and 2 August, originally they were going to take place on 12 and 13 July.
- 14 July: Police raided Cecilia Strzyzowski's cafeteria workplace after the request presented by prosecutors who maintain that César Sena had asked Cecilia to use her business to launder money, receiving the refusal from the young woman, something that would have been a motive for the alleged femicide. Marcela Acuña wrote a third letter from the police station accusing her son of being responsible for the murder.
- 25 July: After being summoned by the Special Prosecutor's Team in charge of the investigation, the witnesses to the civil marriage of Cecilia Strzyzowski and César Sena provided their testimonial statement. A 28-year-old witness claimed that they offered her to be her godmother and that they told her that the wedding party was suspended, but they never told her that they had later divorced. The other witness, a 19-year-old young man, reported that he contacted his friend César de el when he found out about Cecilia's disappearance and that the accused told him that he was worried because something bad could have happened to her.
- 28 July: The Argentine Forensic Anthropology Team (EAAF) of Córdoba reported that due to the state of the charred bones seized in the Tragadero River, DNA samples were not able to be extracted.

=== August 2023 ===
- 3 August: Miguel Strzyzowski died on the same day as his daughter's birthday. The man remained hospitalized for several days and finally died in a private clinic in Resistencia. In interviews, he had previously noted that he had several health problems.
- 10 August: Human blood samples found in the back seat of the Toyota Hilux truck that belonged to César Sena tested negative for compatibility with the DNA of Cecilia Strzyzowski.
- 13 August: Lawyer Juan Arregin resigned from the complaint after the broadcast of an audio by Gloria Romero in which she said that her lawyer is Fernando Burlando. Arregin presented his resignation and questioned his colleague for never having spoken with him

=== September 2023 ===
- 5 September: An investigation finds that the bones found in the Tragadero thought to be alleged human remains had spent at least three hours being burned before being left there.
- 13 September: Cecilia Strzyzowski's mother and sister say that they are moving away from Chaco Province.
- 17 September: Jorge Capitanich fails to win a fourth term as Governor of Chaco, being defeated by Leandro Zdero.
- 19 September: Allegations that Strzyzowski voted in the 2023 Argentine primary elections are debunked by the electoral authorities which removed Strzyzowski as an elector before the elections.

=== October 2023 ===
- 19 October: The Argentine Forensic Anthropology Team reveal that the alleged remains of bone fragments found are impossible to be identified through DNA analysis.

=== November 2023 ===
- 24 November: The Institute of Medicine and Forensic Sciences (IMCiF) of Chaco will carry out DNA examination.
- 25 November: Investigators revealed that one of the 13 pieces of bone remains found is compatible with a human rib.

=== December 2023 ===
- 11 December: The Chaco Justice Department authorized a reunion between Emerenciano Sena, César and Marcela Acuña for their sons 20th birthday.

=== January 2024 ===
- 19 January: Emerenciano Sena and Marcela Acuña were transferred to common prisons in Chaco.
- 29 January: The suspects await trial in February.

=== July 2024 ===
- 4 July: The provincial court of Chaco changed the charges against the Sena couple, and they will now be tried as "co-perpetrators of femicide," as requested by Cecilia Strzyzowski's family. Under this charge, both could potentially be sentenced to 25 years in prison.

=== May 2025 ===
- 27 May: A plea bargain is rejected by the judge.

=== June 2025 ===
- 5 June: Preliminary hearings are held.

=== November 2025 ===
- 15 November: César Sena, Marcela Acuña, and Emerenciano Sena are sentenced to life imprisonment, and Griselda Reinoso is declared innocent.
- 28 November: The third day of the sentencing hearing is held.

=== February 2026 ===
- 10 February: The planned date for the sentence announcement.

== See also ==
- List of murder convictions without a body
- List of solved missing person cases (2020s)
