= Lucila Masin =

Argentine politician

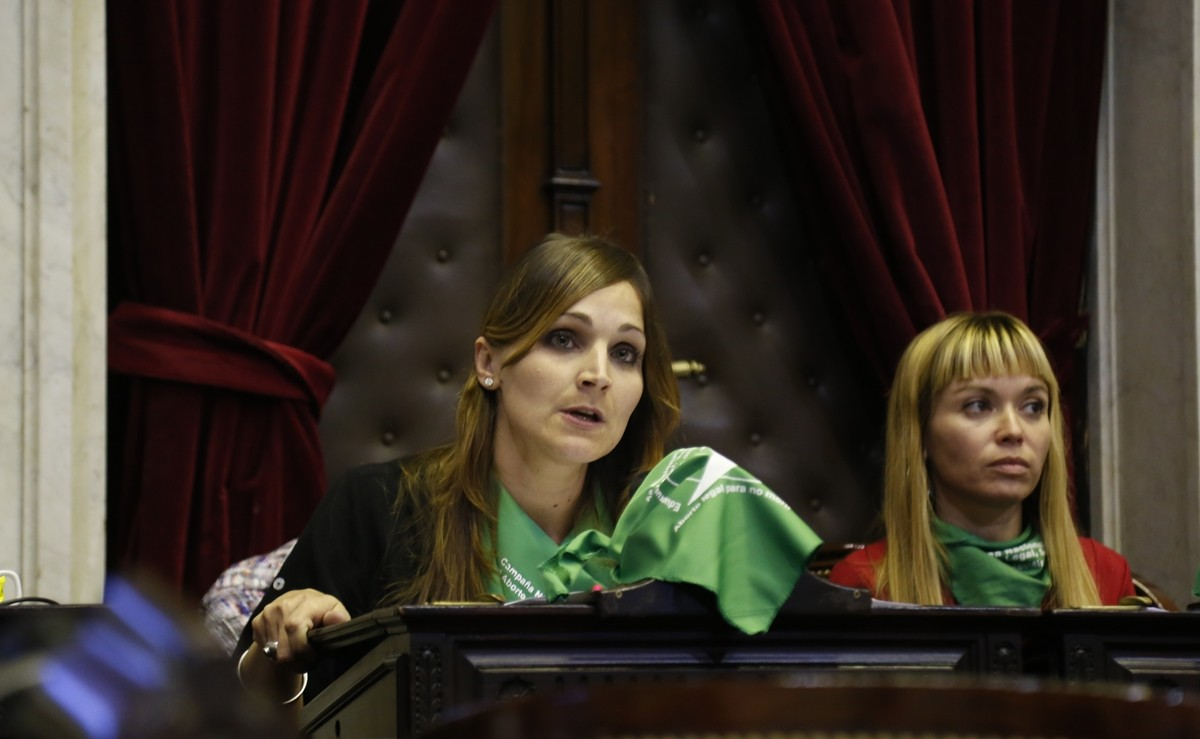

National Deputy
- In office 10 December 2015 – 10 December 2023
- Constituency: Chaco

Personal details
- Born: 31 May 1984 (age 42) Villa Ocampo, Santa Fe Province, Argentina
- Party: Justicialist Party
- Other political affiliations: Front for Victory (2015–2017); Unidad Ciudadana (2017–2019); Frente de Todos (2019–present)
- Education: National University of the Northeast

María Lucila Masin (born 31 May 1984) is an Argentine politician. She served as a National Deputy elected in Chaco Province, first elected in 2015 for the Front for Victory, and later re-elected in 2019 as part of the Frente de Todos.

== Early life and education ==
Masin was born on 31 May 1984 in Villa Ocampo, a city in the General Obligado Department of Santa Fe Province. She completed a degree to be a professor of Education Sciences at the National University of the Northeast. She has one child.

Masin's political activism began in a Kirchnerist political organization in Chaco, called La Pingüina.

== Political career ==
Ahead of the 2015 legislative election, Masin was nominated as the second candidate in the Front for Victory (FPV) list to the Argentine Chamber of Deputies, behind Analía Rach Quiroga. The list received 53.75% of the votes, and both Rach Quiroga and Masin were easily elected.

For the 2019 general election, Masin was the first candidate in the Frente de Todos list; she faced off in the P.A.S.O. primaries against the list supported by former governor Domingo Peppo. Masin's list, which was in turn supported by former governor Jorge Capitanich, won the primary election. The Frente de Todos won 56.70% of the votes in the deputy category, and Masin was elected alongside the second candidate in the list, Aldo Leiva.

As deputy, Masin was a vocal supporter of the legalization of abortion in Argentina, and voted in favor of the two Voluntary Interruption of Pregnancy bills that passed the Chamber, in 2018 and 2020.

In June 2021, she was elected second vice president of the Resistencia chapter of the Justicialist Party.
