= Aída Ayala =

Argentine politician

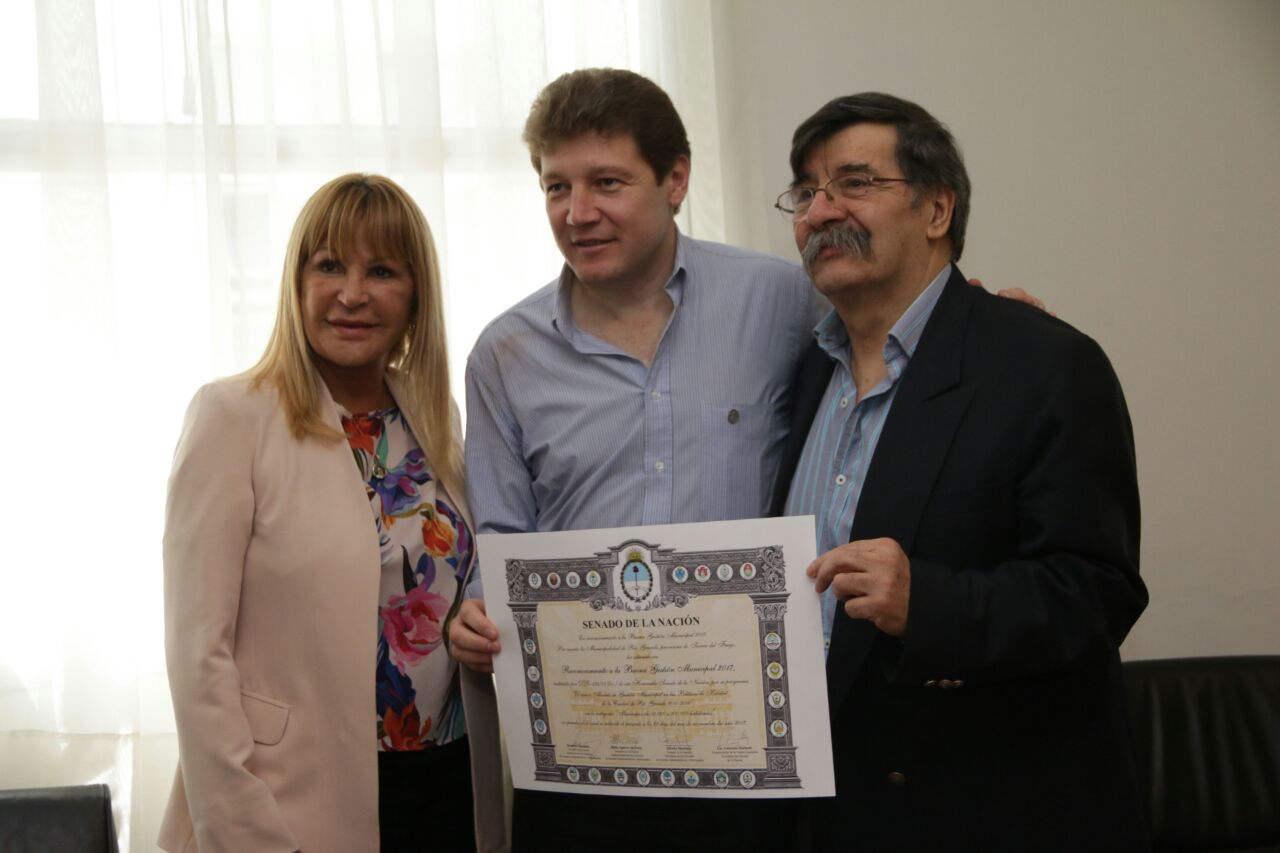

National Deputy
- In office 10 December 2017 – 10 December 2021
- Constituency: Chaco

Secretary of Municipal Affairs
- In office 10 December 2015 – 10 December 2017
- President: Mauricio Macri
- Preceded by: Ignacio Lamothe
- Succeeded by: Lucas Santiago Delfino

Mayor of Resistencia
- In office 10 December 2003 – 10 December 2015
- Preceded by: Benicio S. Szymula
- Succeeded by: Jorge Capitanich

Personal details
- Born: Aída Beatriz Máxima Ayala; 28 June 1953 (age 73) Posadas, Argentina
- Party: Radical Civic Union
- Other political affiliations: Juntos por el Cambio (2015–present)
- Education: National University of the Northeast

Aída Beatriz Máxima Ayala (born 28 June 1953) is an Argentine politician. She served as a National Deputy from 2017 to 2021, and as intendenta (mayor) of Resistencia, Chaco for 12 years, from 2003 to 2015. She also served as Secretary of Municipal Affairs from 2015 to 2017, during the presidency of Mauricio Macri.

In 2018, Ayala was convicted of money laundering committed during her time as mayor of Resistencia; a preventive detention order was issued, but Ayala was not imprisoned due to her parliamentary immunity.

== Early life and education ==
Ayala was born on 28 June 1953 in Posadas, Misiones Province. She moved to Resistencia, Chaco aged 17 to study civil engineering at the National University of the Northeast. She would later marry Torcuato With, with whom she had two daughters, Moira and Maida.

== Political career ==
Ayala was first hired at the Secretariat of Public Works and Services of Resistencia, then going on to serve as department chief of projects at the Secretariat, as well as director of pavements and services. From 1997 to 1999, she was president of Railway ServicesFrom 1999 to 2003, she served in the Resistencia City Council and also presided it.

In 2003, she was elected for the first time to the mayoralty of Resistencia. She was the second woman to serve in the position, after Elda Pértile (1991–1995). She was re-elected in 2007 and 2011, the latter time with 57% of the vote.

Toward the end of her third term, Ayala launched her campaign for the governorship of Chaco Province for the Vamos Chaco front, comprising her Radical Civic Union, Republican Proposal, the Civic Coalition ARI, and the Socialist Party. She faced off the Front for Victory candidate, Domingo Peppo, and lost with 42.11% of the vote against Peppo's 55.28%.

In December 2015, newly elected president Mauricio Macri appointed Ayala as Secretary of Municipal Affairs, within the scope of the Interior Ministry.

=== National Deputy ===
Ayala ran for a seat in the Argentine Chamber of Deputies in the 2017 legislative election; she was the first candidate in the Cambiemos list in Chaco, followed by Alicia Terada. The list was the most voted, with 41.79% of the votes, more than enough for both Ayala and Terada to make it past the D'Hondt cut to be elected. Ayala was sworn in on 10 December 2017.

As a national deputy, Ayala formed part of the parliamentary commissions on Elderly People, Co-operative Affairs and NGOs, Regional Economies and Development, Public Works, Population and Human Development, and Municipal Affairs. She was one of the few deputies who changed their positions regarding the legalisation of abortion in Argentina, voting in favour of the 2018 Voluntary Interruption of Pregnancy bill (which passed the Chamber, but was struck down by the Senate), and then voting against the same bill when it was presented again in 2020.

=== Corruption accusations and conviction ===
In 2014, Ayala was accused of fraudulent administration and other three charges of being involved in a money laundering scheme through municipal public works contracts with Pimp SA. According to the plaintiffs (provincial deputies belonging to the Justicialist Party), up to ARS $269 million were embezzled by Ayala's government; she was linked to Alejandro Fischer, one of Pimp SA's main shareholders and attorney of Fundación Construir (founded by Ayala), as well as a former son in law of Ayala's.

In April 2018, a federal judge based in Resistencia asked the Chamber of Deputies to strip Ayala of her parliamentary immunity in order to arrest her as part of the Pimp SA trial. The judge's request was subject to red tape by the respective parliamentary commission in the Chamber of Deputies, then controlled by the governing Cambiemos alliance.
