= Elda Pértile =

Argentine politician

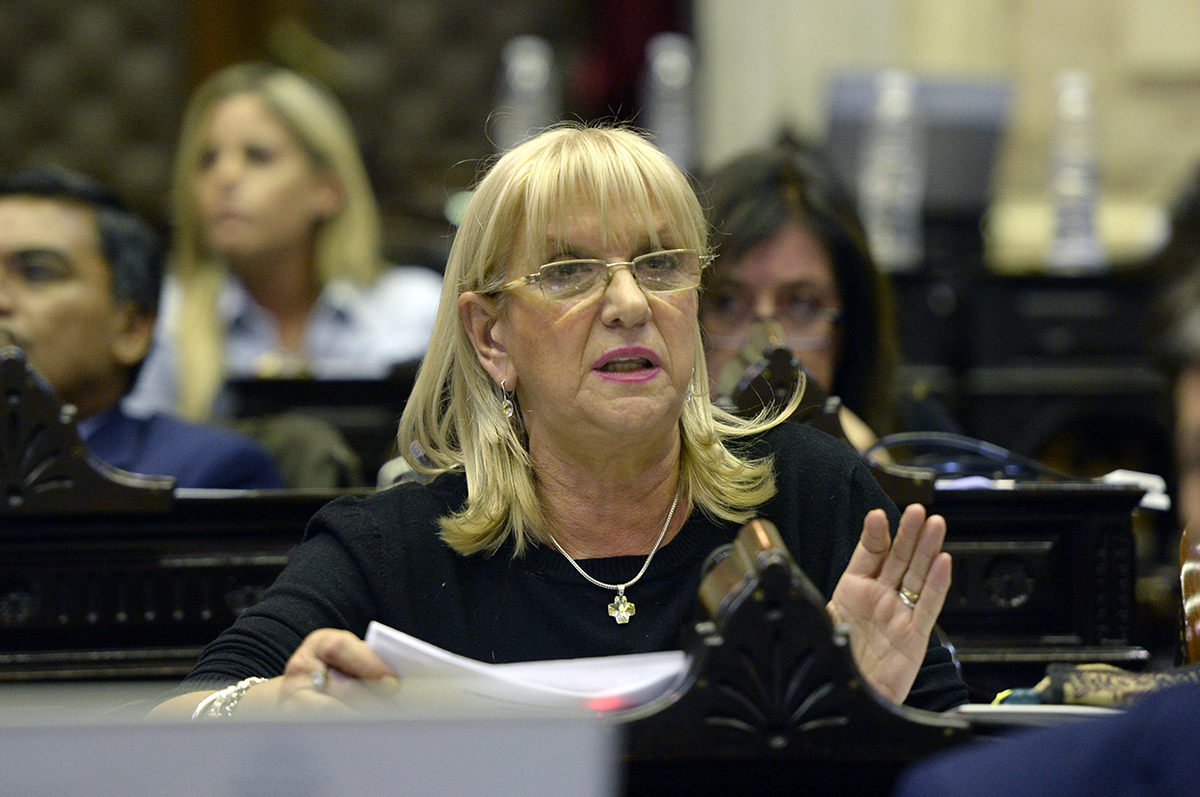

National Deputy
- In office 10 December 2017 – 10 December 2021
- Constituency: Chaco

Provincial Deputy of Chaco
- In office 10 December 2009 – 10 December 2017

Mayor of Resistencia
- In office 10 December 1991 – 10 December 1995
- Preceded by: José Ruiz Palacios
- Succeeded by: Rafael González

Personal details
- Born: 3 June 1953 (age 73) Resistencia, Argentina
- Party: Acción Chaqueña (until 1999); Justicialist Party (since 1999)
- Other political affiliations: Front for Victory (2003–2017); Frente de Todos (2019–present)
- Education: National University of the Northeast

Elda Aída Pértile (born 3 June 1953) is an Argentine politician. Pértile has been active in politics since the 1980s; as a member of the local Acción Chaqueña party, she was elected intendenta (mayor) of Resistencia, Chaco in 1991, serving until 1995. She was also a member of the Resistencia City Council, and served in the Chamber of Deputies of Chaco during two consecutive terms from 2009 to 2017. From 2017 to 2021, she served as a National Deputy.

Pértile was elected to the Argentine Chamber of Deputies in 2017 for the Chaco Merece Más Front, and later sat in the Frente de Todos bloc.

== Early life and education ==
Pértile was born on 3 June 1953 in Resistencia, Chaco Province. She studied public accounting at the National University of the Northeast (UNNE), graduating in 1975. She has also taught administration sciences at the UNNE.

Pértile's husband died in 2017. She has two sons, Esteban and Santiago.

== Political career ==
Pértile's political career began in Acción Chaqueña, a conservative provincial party founded by Resistencia mayor José Ruiz Palacios in 1988. In 1989, Pértile was elected to the Resistencia City Council. Two years later, she was elected mayor of Resistencia herself. She was re-elected for a second two-year term in 1993.

In 1999, Pértile ran for vice-governor of Chaco in the Justicialist Party ticket, headed by Jorge Capitanich. The Capitanich–Pértile ticket received 35.90% of the vote, coming up second in the general election against the Radical Civic Union's Ángel Rozas. From 2002 to 2007, she was a technical advisor at the Federal Tax Redistribution Commission of the National Senate. In 2007, she was appointed General Secretary of Government of Chaco by Governor Capitanich.

In 2009, Pértile was elected to the Provincial Chamber of Deputies of Chaco, as part of the Chaco Merece Más Front (allied to the Front for Victory). She was re-elected in 2013.

=== National Deputy ===
Ahead of the 2017 legislative election, Pértile was nominated as the first candidate in the Chaco Merece Más list to the Argentine Chamber of Deputies, followed by Juan Mosqueda. The list was the second-most voted in the province, with 39.61% of the vote, and both Pértile and Mosqueda were elected. Pértile and Mosqueda formed part of the dissident "Argentina Federal" parliamentary bloc, separate from the Front for Victory bloc led by Agustín Rossi.

As deputy, Pértile formed part of the parliamentary commissions on Municipal Affairs, Population and Human Development, Budget and Treasury, Economy, and Internal Security. She was an opponent of the legalization of abortion in Argentina, voting against the two Voluntary Interruption of Pregnancy bills that passed the Chamber, in 2018 and 2020.
