= Aldo Leiva =

Argentine politician

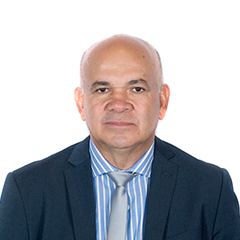

National Deputy
- Incumbent
- Assumed office 10 December 2019
- Constituency: Chaco

Mayor of General José de San Martín
- In office 28 July 2009 – 10 December 2019
- Preceded by: Rubén Guillón
- Succeeded by: Mauro Leiva
- In office 10 December 2003 – 14 November 2008
- Preceded by: Carlos A. Guardianelli
- Succeeded by: Rubén Guillón

Minister of Social Development of Chaco
- In office 14 November 2008 – 28 July 2009
- Governor: Jorge Capitanich
- Preceded by: Cristina Magnano
- Succeeded by: Beatriz Bogado

Personal details
- Born: 1 October 1963 (age 62) General José de San Martín, Chaco Province, Argentina
- Party: Justicialist Party
- Other political affiliations: Front for Victory (2009–2017); Frente de Todos (2019–present)

Aldo Adolfo Leiva (born 10 January 1963) is an Argentine politician and Malvinas War veteran, currently serving as National Deputy elected in Chaco Province. A member of the Justicialist Party, Leiva was elected in 2019, and currently sits in the Frente de Todos parliamentary bloc. He previously served as intendente (mayor) of General José de San Martín, Chaco on two occasions, from 2009 to 2019, and from 2003 to 2008.

== Early and personal life ==
Leiva was born on 1 October 1963 in General José de San Martín, Chaco Province. He did his military service (then mandatory) in the 4th Infantry Regiment of the Argentine Army, based in Monte Caseros, Corrientes. In 1982, when he was 19 years old, he was called upon to fight in the Falklands – Malvinas War. Leiva fought in the Battle of Two Sisters.

Leiva is married to Rosana Miner and has four children.

== Political career ==
Following the war, from 1982 to 1983, Leiva was employed as an undersecretary of the Municipal Council of General José de San Martín. Later, from 1987 to 1988, he was a legislative aide at the Chamber of Deputies of the province. He was also Secretary of Public Works and Services of San Martín from 1989 to 1990. From 1997 to 2000, he was government secretary of Ciervo Petiso. Leiva has served as president of the Chaco Province Justicialist Party, and has been Secretary General of the party council since 2016.

In 2003, he was elected intendente (mayor) of his hometown of General José de San Martín. He was re-elected in 2007. In November 2008, he was appointed Minister of Social Development of Chaco Province by Governor Jorge Capitanich. He was removed from the post following poor showings in the province's social indexes in July 2009, and returned to his position as mayor of San Martín, as he had not resigned, but rather taken leave from the position. He was re-elected in 2011 and 2015.

At the 2019 legislative election, Leiva was the second candidate in the Frente Chaqueño list to the Chamber of Deputies. The list was the most voted with 56.70% of the vote, and Leiva was easily elected, alongside the first candidate in the list, Lucila Masin. Leiva was succeeded in the mayoralty of San Martín by his son, Mauro Leiva.

During his 2019–2023 term, Leiva formed part of the parliamentary commissions on Housing and Urban Planning, Finances, Industry, Public Works, and Transport. He was an opponent of the legalization of abortion in Argentina, voting against the 2020 Voluntary Interruption of Pregnancy bill that passed the Argentine Congress.
