= Laguna Limpia =

- Municipality and village
- Location in Argentina
- Coordinates: 26°29′45″S 59°40′51″W
- Country: Argentina
- Province: Chaco Province
- Department: Libertador General San Martín Department
- Established: 4 September 1944

Government
  - Mayor: Juan de la Cruz Riquelme
- Elevation: 229 m (751 ft)

Population ((2001 census [INDEC]))
  - Total: 1,186
- Time zone: UTC−3 (ART)
- CPA Base: H 3515
- Area code: +54 03725

Laguna Limpia is a village and municipality in Chaco Province in northern Argentina.

== History ==
The village was developed due to the construction of the railroad in the area. The first families started to populate the area, mainly families of the railroad construction workers or their management staff.

It owes its name to the existence of a lake nearby, known for the clarity of its water. This made the first people who arrived to build the train station to call it "the station where the clear lake is", which in time was shortened to "Laguna Limpia" (Clear Lake).

The village was officially formed on 4 September 1944.

== Population ==
The population, according to the 2001 census [INDEC] was 11,876 inhabitants, which more than doubled the population of 433 in the previous census of 1991.

== Roads and connections ==
The main road connecting the town is Provincial Route 30 (unpaved), connecting to the north with Provincial Route 3 (then to Presidencia Roca and Pampa del Indio), and to the south to Ciervo Petiso and Colonias Unidas. The other Provincial road is Provincial Route 42, connecting to the southeast to the village of Las Garcitas.
