= Víctor Zimmermann =

Argentine politician (born 1962)

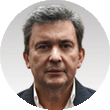

National Senator
- Incumbent
- Assumed office 10 December 2019
- Constituency: Chaco

National Deputy
- In office 10 December 2003 – 10 December 2007
- Constituency: Chaco

Mayor of Comandante Fontana
- In office December 1999 – July 2001
- In office August 1996 – December 1996

Personal details
- Born: 27 September 1962 (age 64) Presidencia Roca, Argentina
- Party: Radical Civic Union
- Other political affiliations: Juntos por el Cambio (since 2015)
- Education: National University of the Northeast

Víctor Zimmermann (born 27 September 1962) is an Argentine businessman and politician, currently serving as a National Senator for Chaco Province since 2019. As a Radical Civic Union (UCR) member, he previously served as a National Deputy and as intendente (mayor) of Comandante Fontana, Chaco.

== Early life ==
Zimmermann was born on 27 September 1962 in Presidencia Roca, Chaco Province. He graduated as an accountant from the National University of the Northeast (UNNE) in 1986, and later taught courses at the UNNE Faculty of Economic Sciences. He also taught at high schools in Chaco.

== Political career ==
Zimmermann became politically active in the Radical Civic Union (UCR). In 1988, he became employed at the municipal government of El Colorado, Formosa Province, as chief of municipal accounting. He also served as an accounting advisor at the municipalities of Presidencia Roca, Ibarreta and Vila 213. In 1995, he became a member of the commission on accountability and control of public spending of Chaco Province.

In August 1996, he was appointed as interim mayor of Comandante Fontana; he served until December 1996. Later, from July 1997 to December 1999, he served as Secretary of Planning and Vice-minister of Economy of Chaco Province under Governor Ángel Rozas. In December 2001, he was elected mayor of Comandante Fontana. From 2012 to 2014, he was president of the Chaco Province UCR committee.

He ran for one of Chaco's seats in the National Chamber of Deputies in the UCR list in 2003. The UCR list came first with 43.89% of the vote, and Zimmermann was elected. He served until 2007. During his time as deputy, he was part of the parliamentary commissions on public finances, economy, treasury and budgets, and presided over the commission on science and technology.

He ran for one of Chaco's three seats in the National Senate in 2019, as the first candidate in the Juntos por el Cambio list. The list came second, with 36.19% of the vote, coming behind the Frente de Todos list, and Zimmermann was elected for the minority.

As a national senator, he formed part of the parliamentary commissions on budgets, science and technology, foreign affairs, administrative affairs, home security and drug traffic, industry and commerce, agriculture and livestock, population and human development, and sports. He was an opponent of the 2020 Voluntary Interruption of Pregnancy Bill, which legalised abortion in Argentina.

== Personal life ==
Zimmermann is married to Soraya Mabel Naidenoff, with whom he has three children. He is of German descent.

== Electoral history ==
=== Executive ===
Electoral history of Víctor Zimmermann
| Election | Office | List | Votes | | | Result | Ref. |
| Election | Office | List | Total | % | P. | Result | Ref. |
|---|---|---|---|---|---|---|---|
| 1999 | Mayor of Comandante Fontana | Frente de Todos | 6,571 | 57.78% | 1st | Elected | |

=== Legislative ===
Electoral history of Víctor Zimmermann
| Election | Office | List | # | District | Votes | | | Result | Ref. |
| Election | Office | List | # | District | Total | % | P. | Result | Ref. |
|---|---|---|---|---|---|---|---|---|---|
| 2003 | National Deputy | Frente de Todos | 1 | Chaco Province | 195,756 | 43.89% | 1st (Note: Presented on an electoral list. The data shown represents the share of the vote the entire party/alliance received in that constituency.) | Elected | |
| 2019 | National Senator | Juntos por el Cambio | 1 | Chaco Province | 254,215 | 36.19% | 2nd | Elected | |
