= Silvana Schneider =

Argentine accountant and politician

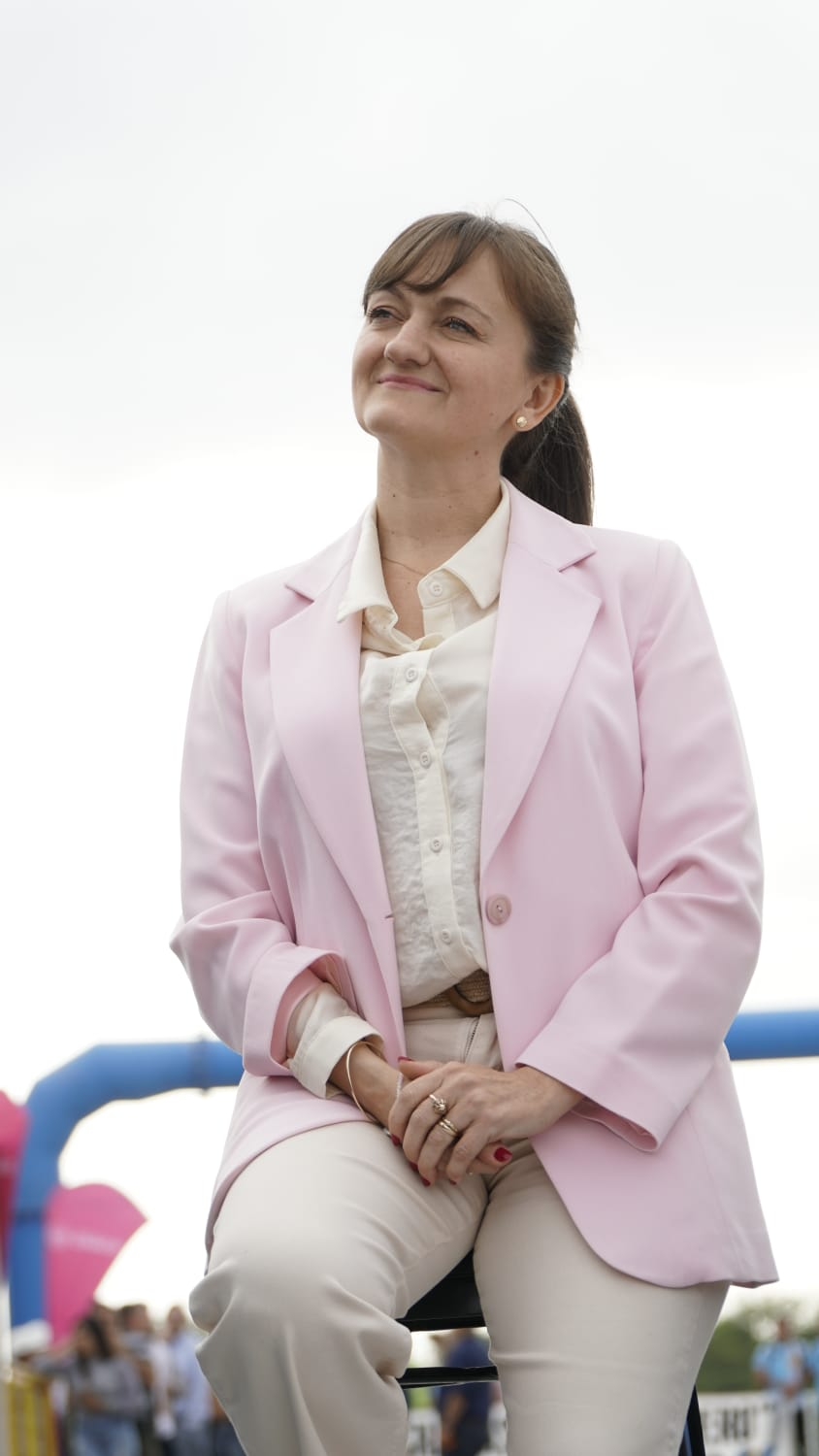

National Senator
- Incumbent
- Assumed office 10 December 2025
- Constituency: Chaco

Vice Governor of Chaco
- In office 10 December 2023 – 10 December 2025
- Governor: Leandro Zdero
- Preceded by: Analía Rach Quiroga

Personal details
- Born: 1981 (age 44–45) Charata, Chaco Province, Argentina
- Party: Radical Civic Union
- Education: National University of the Northeast

Silvana Lorena Schneider (born 1981) is an Argentine accountant and politician affiliated with the Radical Civic Union (UCR). She has served as a national senator for Chaco Province since 10 December 2025. She was elected vice governor of Chaco in 2023 as the running mate of Governor Leandro Zdero and is on leave from that office while serving in the Senate. Upon taking office, Schneider became the second woman to serve as vice governor of the province.

== Early life and education ==
Schneider attended Primary School No. 160 in Pampa Roldán, which is named after her great-grandfather, Alberto Schneider. She completed her secondary education at the Colegio Nacional de Charata. She studied at the National University of the Northeast, where she earned a degree in public accountancy and completed postgraduate studies in taxation. She later earned a university teaching degree in economic sciences from the University of Mendoza.

== Political career ==
In 2019, Schneider stood for election to the Charata City Council as a candidate of the Chaco Somos Todos alliance. She was elected alongside three other candidates from the list for the 2019–2023 term.

=== Vice governor of Chaco ===
Ahead of the 2023 provincial election, provincial deputy and gubernatorial candidate Leandro Zdero selected Schneider as his running mate. The Zdero–Schneider ticket defeated the primary ticket headed by national deputy Juan Carlos Polini, whose running mate was former National University of the Northeast rector Delfina Veiravé.

In the general election, Zdero and Schneider received 46.2% of the vote and defeated the ticket headed by incumbent governor Jorge Capitanich. The result returned the Radical Civic Union to the provincial government after 16 years.

Schneider was sworn in as vice governor and Zdero as governor on 9 December 2023.

=== National senator ===
Schneider was elected to the Argentine Senate in the 2025 Argentine legislative election on the La Libertad Avanza list. Her term began on 10 December 2025 and is scheduled to end on 9 December 2031. She sits with the Radical Civic Union bloc. She took leave from the vice governorship upon assuming her Senate seat.

Political offices
Preceded by Analía Rach Quiroga	Vice Governor of Chaco; 2023–2025	Vacant
