= María Inés Pilatti Vergara =

Argentine politician

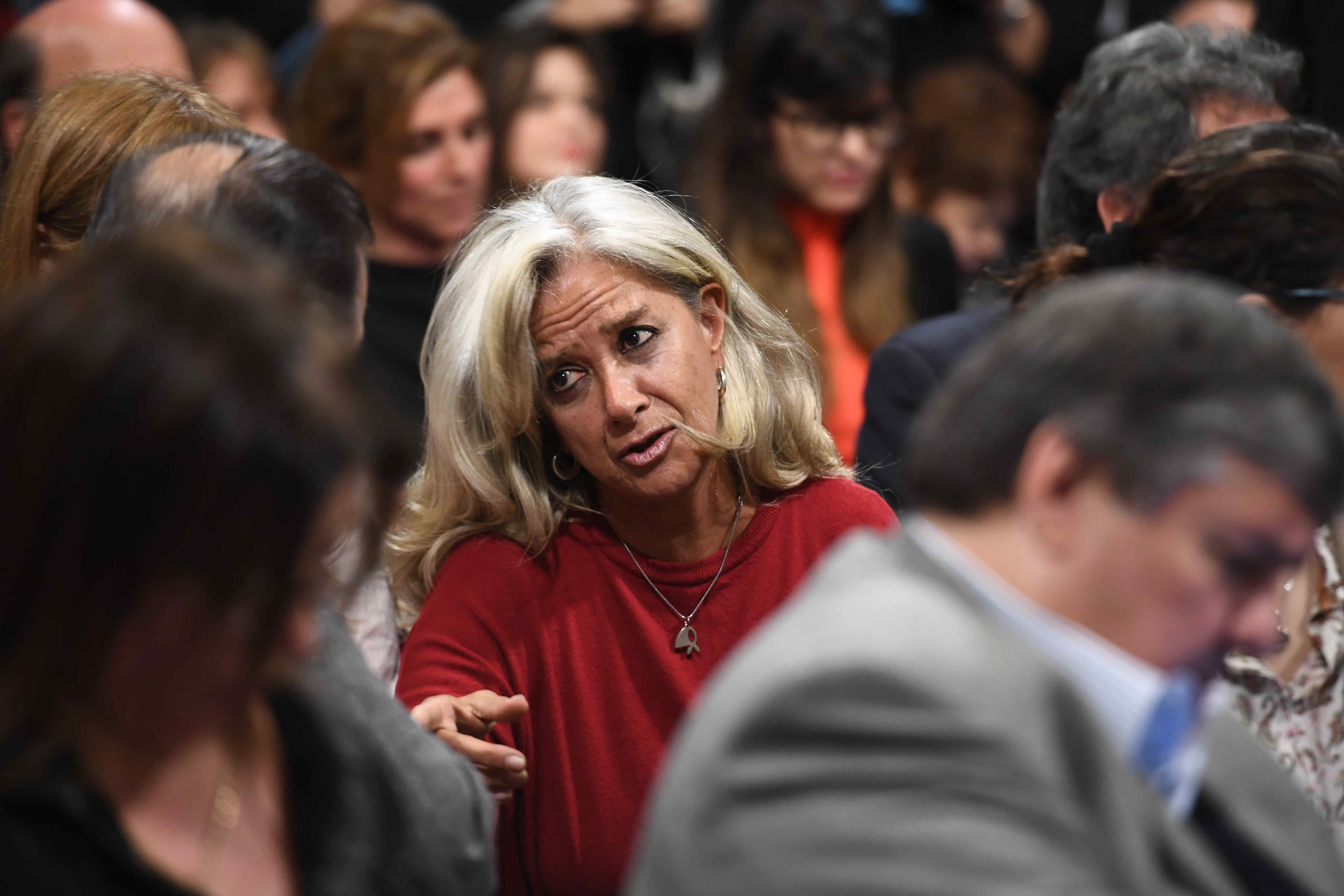

Councillor of Magistracy
- In office 6 February 2020 – 10 December 2025
- Appointed by: Senate

National Senator
- In office 10 December 2013 – 10 December 2025
- Constituency: Chaco

National Deputy
- In office 10 December 2009 – 10 December 2013
- Constituency: Chaco

Provincial Deputy of Chaco
- In office 10 December 2005 – 10 December 2009
- In office 10 December 1997 – 10 December 2001

Personal details
- Born: 2 August 1958 (age 68) Resistencia, Chaco Province, Argentina
- Party: Justicialist Party
- Other political affiliations: Front for Victory (2003–2017); Citizen's Unity (2017–2019); Frente de Todos (2019–2023); Union for the Homeland (2023–present)
- Education: National University of the Northeast

María Inés Patricia Elizabeth Pilatti Vergara (born 2 August 1958) is an Argentine politician belonging to the Justicialist Party. She served as a National Senator for Chaco Province from 2013 to 2025, and as a National Deputy from 2009 to 2013, elected in Chaco as well, and as a member of the Chaco Province Chamber of Deputies during two non-consecutive terms from 1997 to 2001 and from 2005 to 2009.

== Early life and education ==
Pilatti Vergara was born on 2 August 1958 in Resistencia, Chaco Province. She finished high school at the Escuela de Comercio N°5 in Resistencia and studied law at the National University of the Northeast Faculty of Law and Social and Political Sciences.

== Political career ==
Pilatti Vergara's political activism began in the Justicialist Party. She was elected to the Chaco Province Chamber of Deputies in 1997, serving until 2001, and then again in 2005, serving until 2009. As a provincial deputy, Pilatti Vergara was one of the most prominent opponents of then-Vice Governor of Chaco, Miguel Pibernus, who was forced to resign and arrested in 2001 on embezzlement charges. At the 2009 legislative elections, Pilatti Vergara was elected to the Argentine Chamber of Deputies in the Chaco Merece Más ("Chaco Deserves More"; the provincial name of the Front for Victory) list; she was sworn in as National Deputy on 10 December 2009, and served until the expiration of her term on 10 December 2013.

=== National Senator ===
At the 2013 legislative elections, Pilatti Vergara was the second candidate in the Front for Victory (FPV) list to the Argentine Senate in Chaco, and was comfortably elected as the list received 60.62% of the vote. She was sworn in on 28 November 2013, with her mandate beginning on 10 December 2013.

In 2016, Pilatti Vergara introduced legislation to aimed at protecting breast-feeding women; her bill would have mandated the creation of "public lactaries" and declared 12 July the "National Day for the Free Exercise of Maternal Breast-feeding". She also supported a 2019 initiative to introduce a travesti trans work quota in the Argentine national government; although the initiative was not debated in the Senate, a similar initiative was established by a decree issued by President Alberto Fernández in 2020.

She was re-elected for a second six-year term in 2019 as the second candidate in the Frente de Todos list in Chaco.

Pilatti Vergara voted consistently in favour of the Voluntary Interruption of Pregnancy bill, which legalized abortion in Argentina; the first such bill was struck down by her fellow senators on 8 August 2018, while the second was passed by the Senate on 30 December 2020.

She has been a member of the Council of Magistracy of the Nation in representation of the Senate since 6 February 2020.

== Personal life ==
Pilatti Vergara resides in Resistencia; she is married and has two sons. In a 2020 interview, Pilatti Vergara stated that it was her son who convinced her to vote in favor of the legalization of abortion.

== Electoral history ==
Electoral history of María Inés Pilatti Vergara
Election	Office	List	#	District	Votes			Result	Ref.
Election	Office	List	#	District	Total	%	P.	Result	Ref.
1997	Provincial Deputy	Justicialist Party	3	Chaco Province	131,010	31.86%	2nd (Note: Presented on an electoral list. The data shown represents the share of the vote the entire party/alliance received in that constituency.)	Elected	
2005	Provincial Deputy	Front for Victory	1	Chaco Province	144,569	30.55%	2nd	Elected	
2009	National Deputy	Chaco Deserves More	1	Chaco Province	257,147	49.93%	1st	Elected	
2013	National Senator	Front for Victory	2	Chaco Province	366,184	60.62%	1st	Elected	
2019	National Senator	Everybody's Front	2	Chaco Province	400,188	56.98%	1st	Elected	
