= Analía Rach Quiroga =

Argentine politician

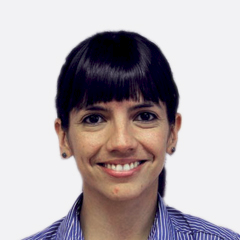

Vice Governor of Chaco
- In office 10 December 2019 – 9 December 2023
- Governor: Jorge Capitanich
- Preceded by: Daniel Capitanich
- Succeeded by: Silvana Schneider

National Deputy
- In office 10 December 2015 – 10 December 2019
- Constituency: Chaco

Personal details
- Born: Analía Alexandra Quiroga; 19 March 1984 (age 42) Castelli, Chaco Province, Argentina
- Party: Justicialist Party
- Other political affiliations: Front for Victory (2015–2017); Citizen's Unity (2017–2019); Frente de Todos (2019–present)
- Education: National University of the Northeast

Analía Alexandra Rach Quiroga (born 19 March 1984) is an Argentine politician. She served as Vice Governor of Chaco Province, alongside Governor Jorge Capitanich, from 10 December 2019 to 9 December 2023. From 2015 to 2019, Rach Quiroga was a National Deputy elected in Chaco Province for the Front for Victory.

== Early life and education ==
Analía Alexandra Quiroga was born on 19 March 1984 in Juan José Castelli, Chaco Province. She was raised by her mother and grandmother; her father initially did not legally acknowledge her, and it wasn't until she was 17 years old that he agreed to give her his last name, henceforth being known as Analía Rach Quiroga.

Rach Quiroga studied law at the National University of the Northeast in Corrientes; she has stated that during her studies, she largely depended on government subsidies and social assistance introduced during the administration of Néstor Kirchner to support herself as she was away from her family.

== Political career ==
Rach Quiroga's political involvement began as an intern and later as a private secretary in the Governorship of Chaco, working under then-government minister Jorge Capitanich. When Capitanich was appointed Cabinet Chief to President Cristina Fernández de Kirchner, Rach Quiroga was in turn appointed coordinator of the Ministers Unit of the Argentine government. During Capitanich's short return to the governorship in 2015, she also served as Legal and Technical Secretary of the province.

=== National Deputy ===
Ahead of the 2015 legislative election, Rach Quiroga was nominated as the first candidate in the Front for Victory (FPV) list to the Argentine Chamber of Deputies. The list received 53.75% of the votes, and Rach Quiroga was easily elected alongside the second candidate in the list, Lucila Masin.

As deputy, Rach Quiroga was perhaps best known for being the main author and driving force behind the "Micaela Law", a 2018 initiative to introduce courses and training on gender issues for all public servants in the national government. The law takes its name from Micaela García, a femicide victim murdered in 2017.

Rach Quiroga was also a supporter of the 2018 Voluntary Interruption of Pregnancy Bill, which would have legalized abortion in Argentina; the bill passed the Chamber of Deputies on 13 June 2018 but failed to pass the Senate, though it was later approved in 2020.

=== Vice Governor ===
In August 2019, ahead of the 2019 general election, Jorge Capitanich announced Rach Quiroga would be his running mate in the Frente Chaqueño ticket to the governorship of Chaco. The ticket won 48.98% of the vote, and the two were elected. Capitanich and Rach Quiroga were both sworn in on 9 December 2019 and took office the following day. Rach Quiroga is the first female vice governor of Chaco.
