= Emilio Carrara =

Argentine politician (died 2021)

Vice Governor of Chaco Province
- In office 10 December 1987 – 10 December 1991
- Governor: Danilo Baroni
- Preceded by: Alberto Torresagasti
- Succeeded by: Luis Varisco

Personal details
- Born: May 26, 1946
- Died: August 20, 2021 (aged 75) Buenos Aires, Argentina
- Party: Justicialist Party
- Spouse: Lilián Vargas
- Children: Four

Emilio Eduardo Carrara (26 may 1946 – 20 August 2021) was an Argentine politician, rancher, businessman, and member of the Justicialist Party (JP). He served as Vice Governor of Chaco Province from 1987 to 1991 under Governor Danilo Baroni. Carrara had previously served as the mayor of Campo Largo from 1973 to 1976.

Chaco gubernatorial candidate Danilo Baroni and his running mate, Emilio Carrara, were elected governor and vice governor of Chaco Province on 10 December 1987. Baroni and Carrara defeated the rival ticket of Luis León and Ángel Rozas by approximately 14,000 in the 1987 gubernatorial election.

Carrara left office in December 1991 after one term as vice governor. He was then elected to the Chamber of Deputies of Chaco Province, including a tenure as the president of the provincial chamber of deputies. He also served as a member of the national Argentine Chamber of Deputies.

Carrara spent his later life focused on ranching and livestock farming.

In 2015, the Chaco provincial government dedicated the new Kindergarten No. 214 of Campo Largo as the "Vice Governor Emilio Eduardo Carrara" in his honor.

Emilio Carrara died in a Buenos Aires hospital on 20 August 2021, at the age of 75. He had been hospitalized in serious condition prior to his death as his health declined. Chaco provincial governor Jorge Capitanich declared three days of mourning from August 20 until August 22 and ordered flags to be flown at half staff during that time. He was buried in Campo Largo.

He was survived by his wife, Lilián Vargas, a lawyer, and four children. His son, Rafael Rubén Carrara, serves as the mayor of Corzuela, as of 2021.
