= Leandro Zdero =

Argentine politician

Governor of Chaco
- Incumbent
- Assumed office 10 December 2023
- Vice Governor: Silvana Schneider (until 2025); Vacant (since 2025)
- Preceded by: Jorge Capitanich

Provincial Deputy of Chaco
- In office 10 December 2017 – 10 December 2023
- In office 10 December 2005 – 10 December 2009

Personal details
- Born: 18 January 1971 (age 55) Quitilipi, Argentina
- Party: Radical Civic Union
- Other political affiliations: Juntos por el Cambio
- Education: National University of the Northeast

Leandro Zdero (born 18 January 1971) is an Argentine politician. He was elected in 2023 to serve as Governor of Chaco Province.

== Biography ==
Leandro Zdero was born in Quitilipi. He is an architect and a teacher at the National University of the Northeast.

He ran for mayor of Resistencia, Chaco in 2015, but was defeated by former governor Jorge Capitanich. He ran again in 2019 and was defeated by Gustavo Martínez.

He ran for governor in 2023, and held primary elections within the Juntos por el Cambio party against Juan Carlos Polini. He won without any noticeable disputes with Polini, who worked alongside him since then. He ran against Governor Jorge Capitanich, who was running for re-election and won. His victory ended 16 years of continuous rule of the Justicialist Party in the province. The transition negotiations between Capitanich and Zdero were interrupted a month later, as the elected vicegovernor Silvana Schneider accused the outgoing government of proving false and misleading information. They also denounced that Capitanich had made cheques to be paid by the administration of Zdero by 1500 millions of pesos, and that he added 17000 new employees to the government.

=== Governor ===
Zdero took office on 9 December 2023. He announced that the province was in a poor condition, and that his administration would start a full audit of the provincial state.

Political offices
Preceded by Jorge Capitanich	Governor of Chaco; 2023–present	Incumbent
