= List of ambassadors of Argentina to Paraguay =

Coordinates: 25.283982°S 57.617158°W

Ambassador of Argentina to Paraguay
- Embajador de Argentina en Asución
- Coat of arms of Argentina
- Inaugural holder: Pedro de Alcántara Bellegarde
- Formation: 1845

The Argentine Ambassador to Paraguay is the Ambassador of the Argentina government to the government of Paraguay.

Diplomatic accreditation	Ambassador	Observations	List of heads of state of Argentina	President of Paraguay	Term end
1845	Pedro de Alcántara Bellegarde		Juan Manuel de Rosas	Carlos Antonio López	
1877	Tristán Achával Rodríguez		Nicolás Avellaneda	Higinio Uriarte	1878
December 30, 1884	Carlos Calvo y Capdevila (1847 – 1908)	Don Carlos Calvo and Capdevila. - December 30, 1884: Roca-Ortiz, Don Carlos Calvo and Capdevila are appointed Resident Minister in Paraguay. - December 30, 1884: Roca-Ortiz, Don Carlos Calvo and Capdevila are appointed Resident Minister in Paraguay. He held that position until December 21, 1886.	Julio Argentino Roca	Bernardino Caballero	December 21, 1886
October 1, 1885	Leopoldo Díaz	Chargé d'affaires	Julio Argentino Roca	Bernardino Caballero	December 1885
December 7, 1886	Martín García Mérou	Don Martin Garcia Mérou. - December 7, 1886: Juárez Celman-Quirno Costa, name him Acting Resident Minister in Paraguay, and on December 21, 1886 he is confirmed in office. On December 18, 1887: Juárez Celman-Quirno Costa, promote him to Extraordinary Envoy and Plenipotentiary Minister in that destination.	Miguel Juárez Celman	Patricio Escobar	
April 16, 1891	Ramón Mendoza	Don Ramón Mendoza. - April 16, 1891: Pellegrini- Eduardo Costa, name him Resident Minister in Paraguay. On January 29, 1892: Pellegrini-Zeballos, promoted to Extraordinary Envoy and Plenipotentiary Minister in the same destination.	Carlos Pellegrini	Juan Gualberto González	February 29, 1892
March 21, 1893	José Manuel Estrada	Don José Manuel Estrada. - March 21, 1893: Luis Sáenz Peña-Anchorena, name him Extraordinary Envoy and Plenipotentiary Minister. (He died on September 17, 1894, while serving.)	Luis Sáenz Peña	Juan Gualberto González	September 17, 1894
February 16, 1895	Lauro Cabral	Don Lauro Cabral. - February 16, 1895: José E. Uriburu-Amancio Alcorta, name him Charge d'Affaires in Paraguay. On January 10, 1896: Uriburu-Alcorta, promote him to Resident Minister, and, on March 31, 1897, to Extraordinary Envoy and Plenipotentiary Minister in the same destination. Lauro Cabral in his diplomatic life of more than twenty years knew how to conduct himself with correction of his good character. Franco, open, sincere and good friend. His diplomatic attention did not prevent him from having pleasant moments with his	Julio Argentino Roca	Marcos A. Morínigo	
September 23, 1902	Alejandro Guesalaga	Don Alejandro Guesalaga. - September 23, 1902: Roca-Drago, designates Don Alejandro Guesalaga, Extraordinary Envoy and Plenipotentiary Minister in Paraguay. He performed these functions until May 17, 1905.	Julio Argentino Roca	Andrés Héctor Carvallo	May 17, 1905
May 17, 1905	Vicente Gaspar Quesada	Dr. Vicente G. Quesada. - May 17, 1905: Quintana-Rodriguez Larreta (h.), Transferred to Paraguay to the Extraordinary Envoy and Plenipotentiary Minister Dr. Vicente G. Quesada.	Manuel Quintana	Cecilio Báez	
October 14, 1907	Gabriel Martinez Campos	Don Gabriel Martinez Campos. - October 14, 1907: Figueroa Alcorta-Estanislao S. Zeballos, promoted to the First Secretary Don Gabriel Martinez Campos, in charge of Extraordinary Envoy and Plenipotentiary Minister in Paraguay. in 1923, Gabriel Martínez Campos, plenipotentiary minister in Warsaw,	José Figueroa Alcorta	Benigno Ferreira	
July 27, 1912	Mario Ruiz de los Llanos	Dr. Mario Ruiz de los Llanos. - July 27, 1912: Sáenz Peña-Bosch, designates Dr. Mario Ruiz de los Llanos Extraordinary Envoy and Plenipotentiary Minister in Paraguay. Until July 25, 1916, he holds the position; On this last date he was transferred to another destination. 1925-1930 was ambassador to Japan	Roque Sáenz Peña	Pedro Pablo Peña	July 25, 1916
July 25, 1916	José María Cantilo (nieto)	Don José Maria Cantilo. - July 25, 1916: Plaza-Murature, designates Extraordinary Envoy and Minister Pl (nipotentiary in Paraguay to Mr. José Maria Canilo. He held the position until August 18, 1919.	Hipólito Yrigoyen	Manuel Franco	August 18, 1919
August 14, 1916	Atilio Sixto Barilari	Vice-Mayor Don Atilio S. Barilari. - August 14, 1916: Plaza-Murature, designate him so that in the character of Ambassador Extraordinary and Plenipotentiary in special mission, he represents the Argentine Government in the transmission of the supreme command in the Republic of Paraguay, to be held on the 15th of that month.	Hipólito Yrigoyen	Manuel Franco	August 15, 1916
August 18, 1919	Eudoro Vargas Gómez	Dr. Euix) ro Vargas Gómez. - August 18, 1919: Irigen-appointed Extraordinary Envoy and Plenipotentiary Minister in Paraguay to Dr. Eudoro Vargas Gómez. On February 2, 1920, he resigned from office.	Hipólito Yrigoyen	José Pedro Montero	February 2, 1920
June 30, 1920	Laurentino Olascoaga Urtubey (1874 - 1950)	Dr. Laurentino Olascoaga. - June 30, 1920: Irigoyen-Pueyrredón, transferred to the Legation in Paraguay to the Extraordinary Envoy and Plenipotentiary Minister Dr. Laurentino Olascoaga. On September 28, 1923, he was transferred to another destination.	Hipólito Yrigoyen	Manuel Gondra	September 28, 1923
September 28, 1923	Leopoldo Díaz	Dr. Leopoldo Díaz. - September 28, 1923: Alvear-Gallardo, designates Extraordinary Envoy and Minister. Plenipotentiary in Paraguay to Dr. Leopoldo Díaz. On May 31, 1926 he was transferred to another country.	Marcelo Torcuato de Alvear	Eligio Ayala	May 31, 1926
August 6, 1924	Fernando Saguier	Dr. Fernando Saguier. - August 6, 1924: Alvear-Gallardo, appointed National Senator Dr. Fernando Saguier, Ambassador Extraordinary and Plenipotentiary in special mission, to represent the Argentine Government on the transmission of the presidential command. Integrate the Mission, the Extraordinary Envoy and Plenipotentiary Minister in Paraguay Dr. Leopoldo Díaz.	Marcelo Torcuato de Alvear	Luis Alberto Riart	
May 31, 1926	Ricardo Olivera	Dr. Ricardo Olivera. - May 31, 1926: Alvear- Gallardo, Dr. Ricardo Oliv is transferred to the Legation in Paraguay	Marcelo Torcuato de Alvear	Luis Alberto Riart	July 14, 1927
August 3, 1928	Miguel Susini		Hipólito Yrigoyen	José Patricio Guggiari	
1928	Alejandro Gancedo (hijo)		Hipólito Yrigoyen	José Patricio Guggiari	
April 14, 1929	Héctor Alvarez Cina		Hipólito Yrigoyen	José Patricio Guggiari	
February 2, 1934	Rodolfo Freyre		Agustín Pedro Justo	Eusebio Ayala	July 7, 1937
February 4, 1937	Juan G. Valenzuela		Agustín Pedro Justo	Félix Paiva	1939
June 26, 1939	Luis S. Castiñeiras		Roberto María Ortiz	José Félix Estigarribia	
September 11, 1942	Luis S. Castiñeiras		Ramón Castillo	Higinio Morínigo	
September 20, 1945	Eduardo Luis Vivot Ayerza		Juan Perón	Higinio Morínigo	
September 1, 1958	Blas Benjamín de la Vega		Arturo Frondizi	Alfredo Stroessner	March 1, 1962
1969	Mario Díaz Colodrero		Juan Carlos Onganía	Alfredo Stroessner	1970
1970	Marco Aurelio Benítez Sánchez		Roberto Marcelo Levingston	Alfredo Stroessner	
September 1982	Eduardo Crespi		Alfredo Saint Jean	Alfredo Stroessner	November 1983
1983	Raúl Alberto Quijano		Raúl Alfonsín	Alfredo Stroessner	1989
1989	Floro Bogado		Carlos Menem	Andrés Rodríguez	1991
December 10, 1991	Néstor Ahuad		Carlos Menem	Andrés Rodríguez	
1994	Raúl Eduardo Carígnano		Carlos Menem	Juan Carlos Wasmosy	
1999	José Maria Berro Madero		Fernando de la Rúa	Luis Ángel González Macchi	2002
2002	Félix Alberto Córdova Moyano		Eduardo Duhalde	Luis Ángel González Macchi	2004
January 6, 2005	Rafael Romá		Néstor Kirchner	Nicanor Duarte Frutos	May 25, 2012
September 4, 2014	Ana Corradi		Cristina Fernández de Kirchner	Horacio Cartes	January 8, 2016
January 8, 2016	Eduardo Zuain		Mauricio Macri	Horacio Cartes	August 1, 2017
November 15, 2017	Héctor Lostri		Mauricio Macri	Horacio Cartes	2019
January 29, 2020	Domingo Peppo		Alberto Fernández	Mario Abdo Benítez	2023
