= Danilo Baroni =

Argentinian lawyer and politician

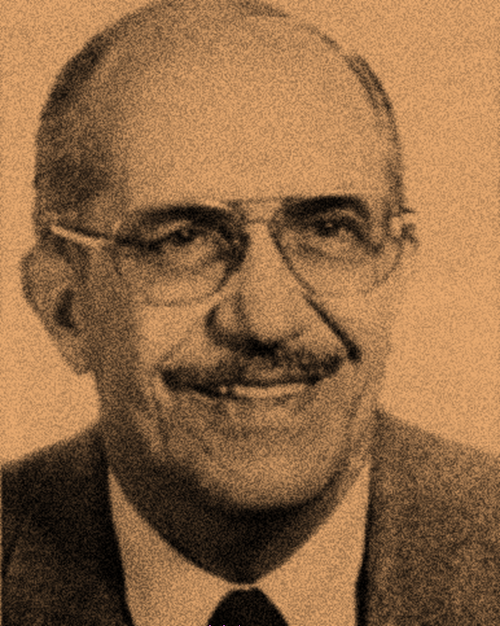

Governor of Chaco Province
- In office December 10, 1987 – December 10, 1991
- Governor: Emilio Carrara
- Preceded by: Florencio Tenev
- Succeeded by: Rolando Tauguinas

Personal details
- Born: July 12, 1922 Calchaquí, Santa Fe Province, Argentina
- Died: June 9, 2014 (aged 91) Resistencia, Chaco Province, Argentina
- Party: Justicialist Party
- Spouse: Gladis Nilda Harvey
- Children: Six
- Occupation: Lawyer

Danilo Luis Baroni (July 12, 1922 – June 9, 2014) was an Argentine lawyer and politician. Baroni, a member of the Justicialist Party, served as the Governor of Chaco Province from December 10, 1987, until December 10, 1991.

Baroni died in Resistencia, Chaco, Argentina, on June 9, 2014, at the age of 92.
