= General José de San Martín, Chaco =

General José de San Martín
- City
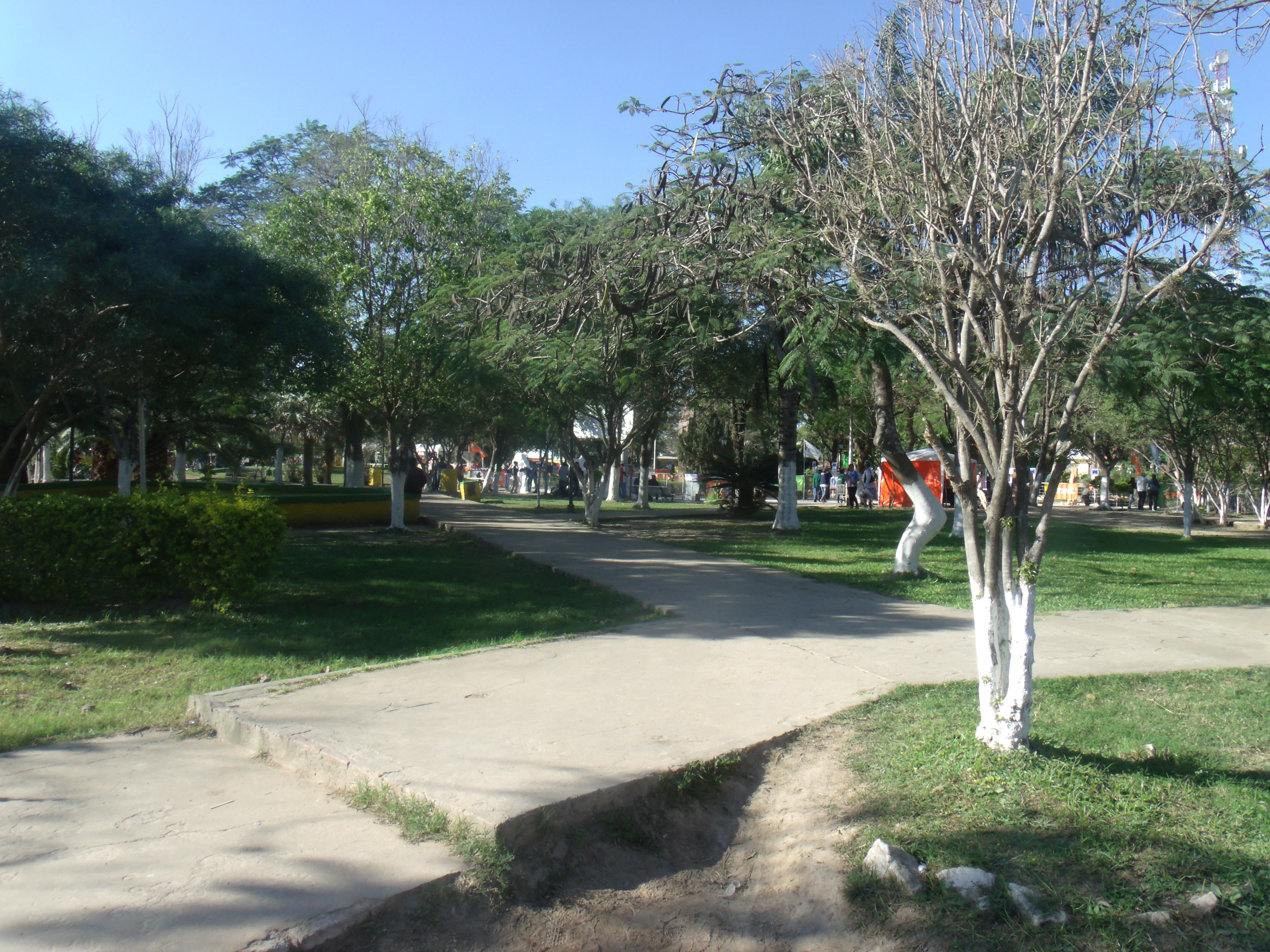
- Plaza Principal

- Location of General José de San Martín in Argentina
- Coordinates: 26.5375°S 59.3417°W
- Country: Argentina
- Province: Chaco
- Department: Libertador Gen. S. Martín

Area
  - Total: 79.89 km^{2} (30.85 sq mi)
- Elevation: 74 m (243 ft)

Population
  - Total: 31,758
  - Density: 397.5/km^{2} (1,030/sq mi)
- Time zone: UTC−3 (ART)
- Climate: Cfa

General José de San Martín is a city in the north-east of the province of Chaco, Argentina. It is named after José de San Martín, the Argentine general who played a major role in South America's fight for independence from Spain (see Argentine War of Independence).

== History ==
The town was founded under the name of El Zapallar on 25 April 1907, although the measurement and division of the terrain was not properly finished until 2 July 1913. Its progress was slow due to the lack of communications, which began only in 1917 when Juan Godoy opened a precarious bus line that linked El Zapallar with the provincial capital Resistencia, 120 km away.

By 1924 El Zapallar had 5,000 inhabitants and was the head town of the Toba Department. It had a police station, a court, a civil registration, a social club, and mail and telegraph services. That year the El Zapallar Agricultural Cattleman Association was established. The Quijano railroad line also contributed to the growth of the town, by connecting it to Lapachito.

A Development Commission was created by decree of Hipólito Yrigoyen in 1928. In 1934 the town was turned into a municipality, which was renamed General José de San Martín in 1955.

== Communications ==
The area is crossed southwest to northwest by National Route 90, asphalted, which links it to Resistencia, and also by the Provincial Routes 3 and 7, which cross it respectively from east to west and from east to southwest. The city has an airstrip of limited capacity.
