= Ángel Rozas =

Argentine politician

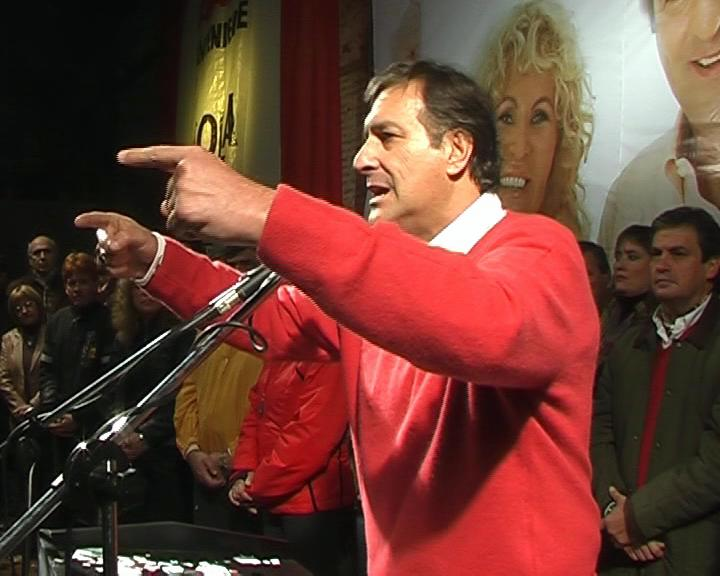

National Senator
- In office 3 December 2013 – 10 December 2019
- Constituency: Chaco

Councillor of Magistracy
- In office 12 November 2014 – 18 November 2018
- Appointed by: Senate

Governor of Chaco
- In office 10 December 1995 – 10 December 2003
- Vice Governor: Roy Nikisch
- Preceded by: Rolando Tauguinas
- Succeeded by: Roy Nikisch

Personal details
- Born: 22 March 1950 (age 76) General Pinedo, Chaco
- Party: Radical Civic Union
- Other political affiliations: Juntos por el Cambio
- Profession: Lawyer

Ángel Rozas (born 22 March 1950) is a retired Argentine politician. A member of the Radical Civic Union (UCR), Rozas was Governor of Chaco Province from 1995 to 2003, and served as a National Senator for Chaco from 2013 to 2019.

Rozas was born in General Pinedo, Chaco, to a smallholding family. He earned a law degree at the Universidad Nacional del Litoral. Rozas first held elected office in 1983 as a Chaco Provincial Deputy, serving for three terms. He was a candidate to be vice-governor in 1987.

Rozas served as governor of Chaco Province from December 1995 to December 2003, re-elected in 1999. In 1999 he was also elected vice-president of the national committee of the UCR and in 2001 was elected president, serving until 2005 when he was replaced by Roberto Iglesias. He was elected to the Argentine Chamber of Deputies for Chaco in 2005. As a leading figure in his party, he was seen as a possible candidate for the 2007 presidential elections, although the UCR was (and continues to be) electorally weak and split between supporters of President Néstor Kirchner and Roberto Lavagna. Eventually Rozas ran to be Governor of Chaco once again, in support of the presidential campaign of Lavagna. He lost to Jorge Capitanich by just 0.8% of the vote.

From June 2005 Rozas has headed the Leandro N. Alem Foundation. He is married with two daughters. His son died in 1990.

In the 2015 Argentine general elections, he was elected to the Argentine Senate for the Chaco province. On the preparatory season of the Argentine Senate on December 3, 2015, he was elected as the leader of the Radical Civic Union caucus on the Senate, also replacing Luis Petcoff Naidenoff as the Senate minority leader.

| Preceded by Rolando Tauguinas | Governor of Chaco; 1995–2003 | Succeeded by Roy Nikisch |
