= La Eduvigis =

Coordinates: 26°50′S 59°05′W

- Municipality and village
- Interactive map of La Eduvigis
- Country: Argentina
- Province: Chaco Province
- Time zone: UTC−3 (ART)

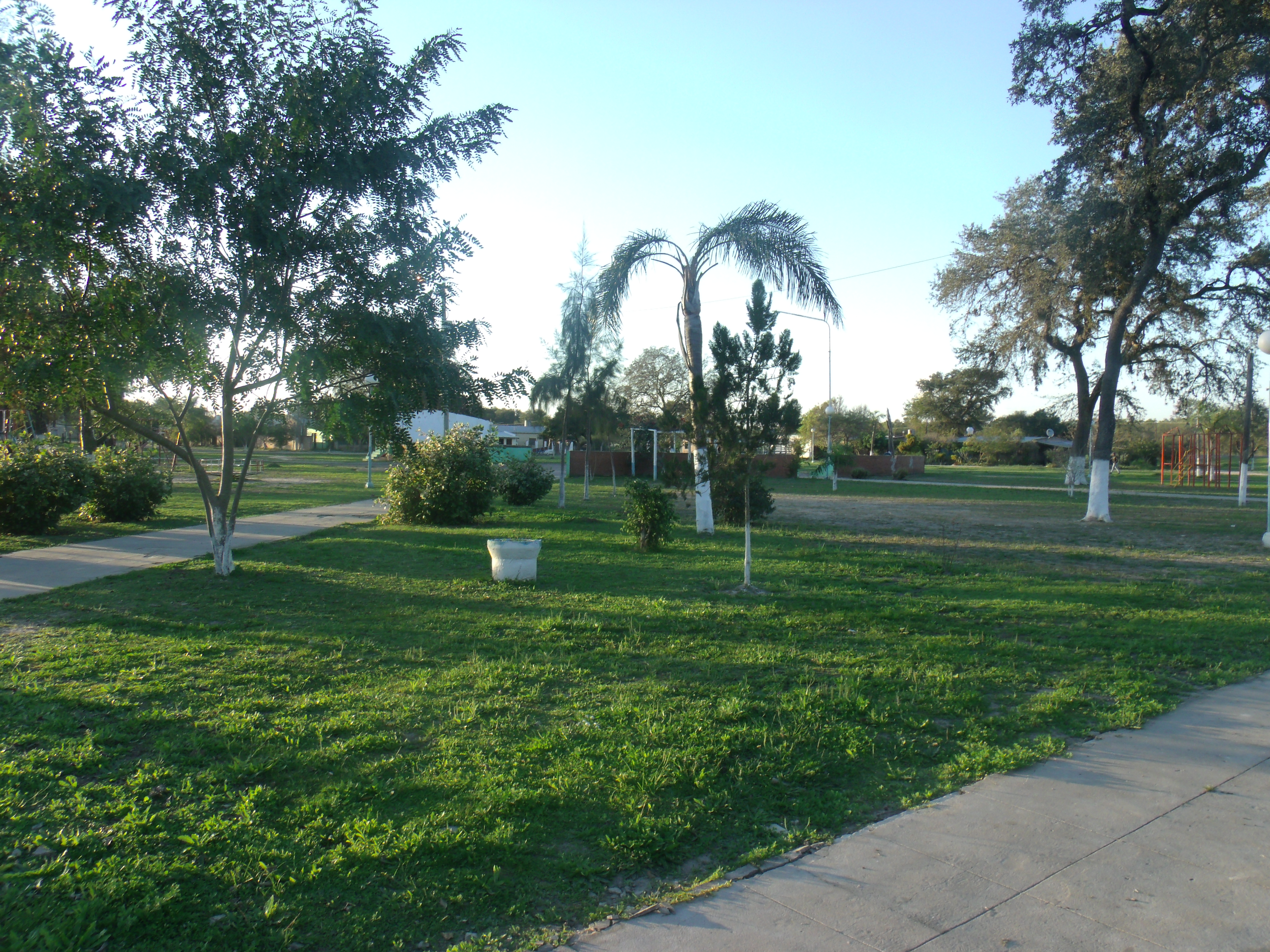
La Eduvigis

La Eduvigis is a village and municipality in Chaco Province in northern Argentina.
