= Domingo Peppo =

Argentine politician

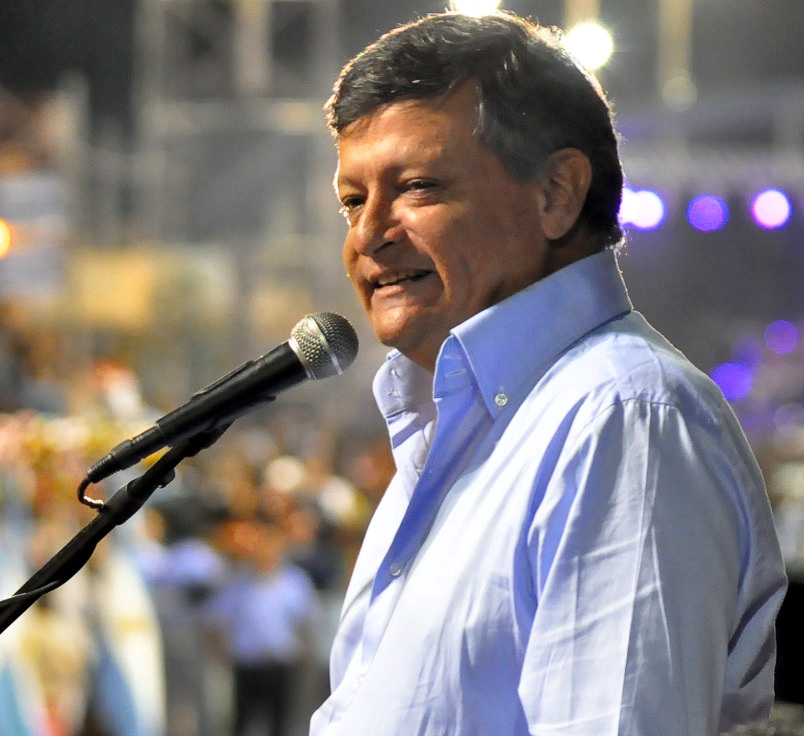

Argentine ambassador to Paraguay
- In office 29 January 2020 – 10 December 2023
- Preceded by: Héctor Lostri

Governor of Chaco
- In office 10 December 2015 – 10 December 2019
- Vice Governor: Daniel Capitanich
- Preceded by: Jorge Capitanich
- Succeeded by: Jorge Capitanich

Mayor of Villa Ángela
- In office 10 December 2003 – 10 December 2015
- Preceded by: Carlos Lobera
- Succeeded by: Adalberto Papp

Personal details
- Born: 6 July 1958 (age 68) Santo Tomé, Corrientes Province, Argentina
- Party: Justicialist Party
- Education: National University of the Northeast

Oscar Domingo Peppo (born 6 July 1958) is an Argentine politician. He was elected governor of the Chaco Province in 2015 (with 55.42% of the vote). In the early 1980s, he received a degree in construction, hydraulic and civil engineering in Resistencia and later worked as technical representative and general coordinator of the silo plants for a company. He also previously served as mayor of Villa Ángela. On January 29, 2020 he was appointed Argentinian ambassador to Paraguay.
