= Pampa Almirón =

Coordinates: 26°42′S 59°08′W

- Municipality and village
- Interactive map of Pampa Almirón
- Country: Argentina
- Province: Chaco Province
- Time zone: UTC−3 (ART)

Pampa Almirón

Pampa Almirón is a village and municipality in Chaco Province in northern Argentina.
