= Roy Nikisch =

Argentine politician

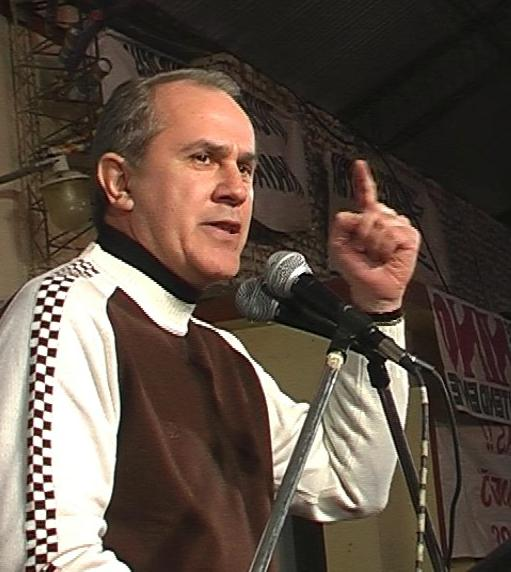

Governor of Chaco
- In office 10 December 2003 – 10 December 2007
- Vice Governor: Eduardo Moro
- Preceded by: Ángel Rozas
- Succeeded by: Jorge Capitanich

Personal details
- Born: 1951 (age 74–75) Tres Isletas
- Party: Radical Civic Union

Roy Abelardo Nikisch (born 1951) is an Argentine Radical Civic Union senator, who served as governor of Chaco Province between 2003 and 2007.

Nikisch was mayor of Tres Isletas and later served as vice governor of Chaco under Ángel Rozas until 2003.

In 2003, Nikisch was elected governor of the province with 53% of the vote, leading the Alianza Frente de Todos to victory over Jorge Capitanich of the Justicialist Party. His term expired in 2007, when he was elected to the Argentine Senate.

Preceded by Ángel Rozas	Governor of Chaco; 2003-2007	Succeeded by Jorge Capitanich
