= Comandante Fontana, Chaco =

Coordinates: 27°25′S 59°02′W

Comandante Fontana
- City
- San Fernando
- Interactive map of Comandante Fontana
- Country: Argentina
- Province: Chaco
- Elevation: 171 ft (52 m)

Population (2010)
  - Total: 32,027
- Time zone: UTC−3 (ART)
- Postal code: H3514
- Website: www.municipiofontana.com.ar

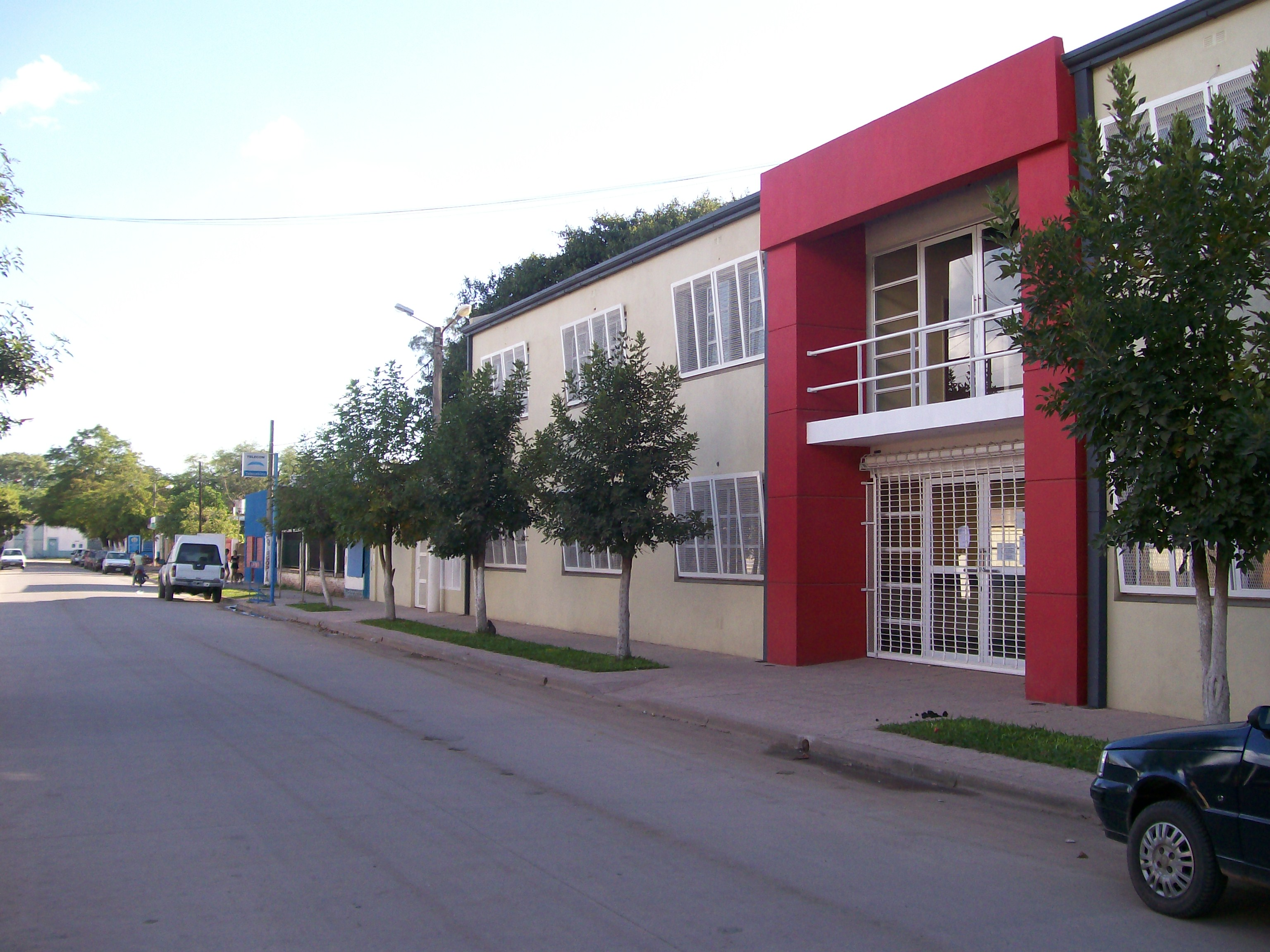
Fontana

Comandante Fontana is an Argentinian city, located in Chaco Province in northern Argentina.
