= Pampa del Indio =

Coordinates: 26°02′S 59°55′W

- Municipality and village
- Interactive map of Pampa del Indio
- Country: Argentina
- Province: Chaco Province
- Time zone: UTC−3 (ART)

Pampa del Indio is a village and municipality in Chaco Province in northern Argentina.
