= Presidencia Roca =

Coordinates: 26°08′S 59°36′W

- Municipality and village
- Interactive map of Presidencia Roca
- Country: Argentina
- Province: Chaco Province
- Time zone: UTC−3 (ART)

Presidencia Roca is a village and municipality in Chaco Province in northern Argentina.
