= Chamber of Deputies of Chaco =

Legislative body of Chaco Province, Argentina

Type
- Type: Unicameral

Leadership
- President: Lidia Élida Cuesta (PJ) since 10 December 2019
- First Vice President: Jaime Parra Moreno (FI) since 10 December 2019
- Second Vice President: Leandro Zdero (UCR) since 10 December 2019

Structure
- Seats: 32 legislators
- Political groups: Government (17): Justicialist (14); Broad Front (1); NePar (1); PTP (1); Opposition (15): UCR–CS (8); Integrator Front (3); UCR-Alfonsín (2); UCR–SP (1); PRO Chaco (1)
- Length of term: 4 years
- Authority: Constitution of Chaco

Elections
- Voting system: Proportional representation
- Last election: 14 November 2021
- Next election: 2023

Meeting place
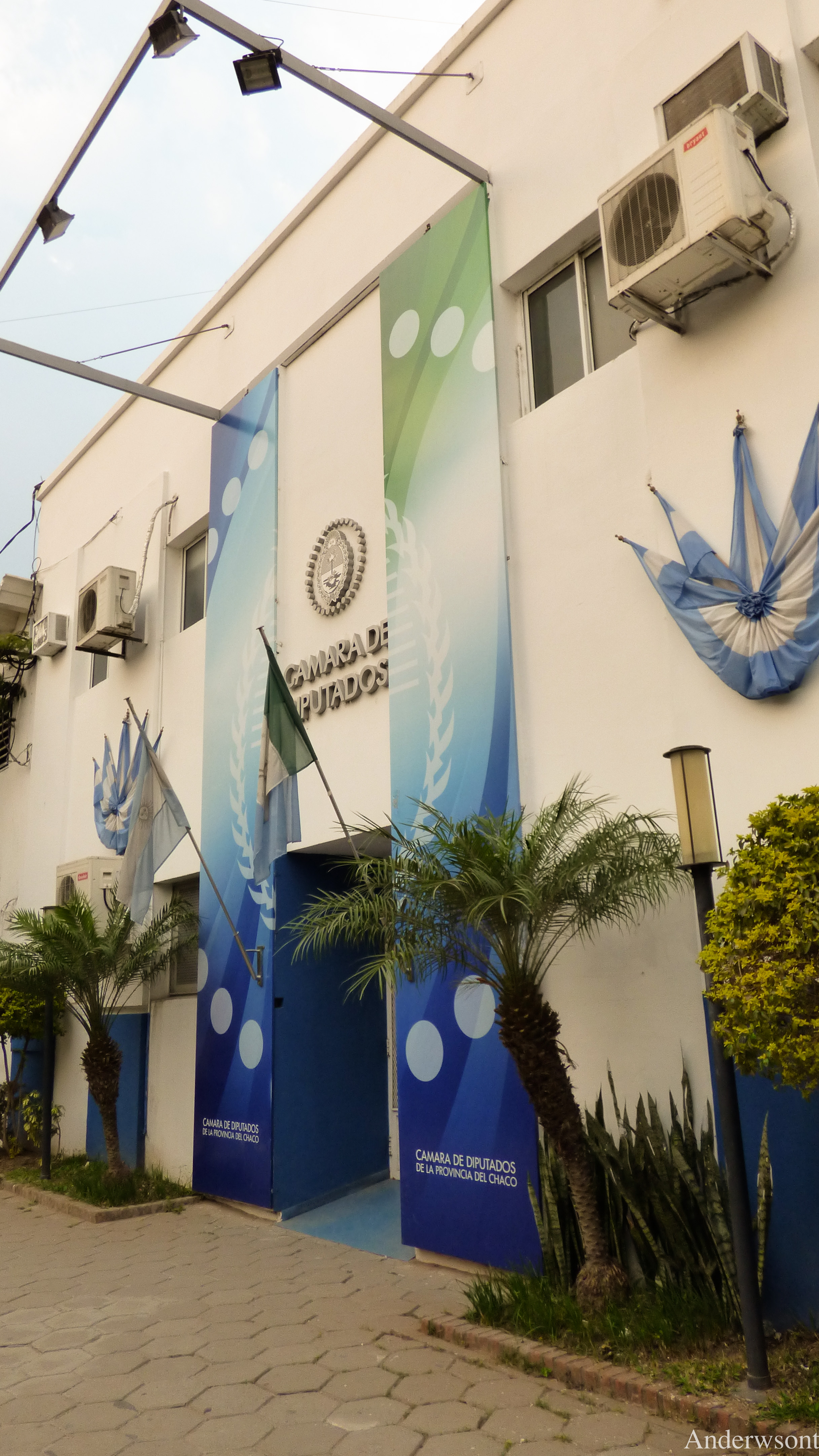
- Legislatura de la Provincia del Chaco, Resistencia, Chaco Province

Website
- legislaturachaco.gov.ar

The Chamber of Deputies of Chaco Province (Spanish: Cámara de Diputados de la Provincia del Chaco), also widely known as the Legislative Power (Poder Legislativo), is the unicameral legislative body of Chaco Province, in Argentina. It convenes in the provincial capital, Resistencia.

It comprises 32 legislators elected in a single multi-member province-wide district through proportional representation. Members are elected by halves in staggered elections for four-year terms every two years.

Unlike most other provincial legislatures in Argentina, the Chamber of Deputies of Chaco is not presided by the provincial vice governor. Instead, the chamber has its own presiding officer, elected from among its members. Since 2021, the president of the Chamber has been Lidia Cuesta, of the Justicialist Party.

== History ==
The legislative power of Chaco was established upon the adoption of the province's first constitution in 1951, the same year the National Territory of Chaco became a province of Argentina, under the name of "Juan Perón Province". The first Legislature of Juan Perón Province convened in 1952. Under the first electoral system employed by this legislature, half of its members were directly elected through universal suffrage, while the remaining half was selected by corporate associations. The legislature operated until September 1955, when a coup d'état intervened all democratic institutions in the country and banned Peronism, changing the province's name back to Chaco.

A second constitutional assembly was called upon by the new regime in 1957, with no participation from the Justicialist Party. That year, a new constitution was adopted by the province. The 1957 Constitution remains in place, having most recently been amended in 1994.

== Commissions ==
The Chamber of Deputies presently has five permanent commissions: constitutional affairs, general legislation, justice and security, budgets and finances, public works and services, and labour legislation, pensions and social security.
