= Ciervo Petiso =

Coordinates: 26°35′S 59°38′W

- Municipality and village
- Interactive map of Ciervo Petiso
- Country: Argentina
- Province: Chaco Province
- Time zone: UTC−3 (ART)

Ciervo Petiso is a village and municipality in Chaco Province in northern Argentina.
