= Governor of Chaco Province =

Governor of the Argentine province of Chaco

- Coat of arms of Chaco Province
- Incumbent; Leandro Zdero since 9 December 2023
- Appointer: Direct popular vote
- Term length: 4 years
- Inaugural holder: Julio de Vedia

The Governor of Chaco (Spanish: Gobernador de la Provincia del Chaco) is a citizen of the Chaco Province, in Argentina, holding the office of governor for the corresponding period. The governor is elected alongside a vice-governor. The current governor of Chaco is Jorge Capitanich, since 10 December 2019; Capitanich previously held the post from 2007 to 2013 and from February to December 2015.

== Governors since 1983 ==
Governor	Term in office	Party	Election	Vice Governor
Florencio Tenev	10 December 1983 – 10 December 1987	PJ	1983	Alberto Torresagasti
Danilo Baroni	10 December 1987 – 10 December 1991	PJ	1987	Emilio Carrara
Rolando Tauguinas	10 December 1991 – 10 December 1995	ACHA	1991	Luis Varisco
Ángel Rozas	10 December 1995 – 10 December 2003	UCR	1995	Miguel Pibernus
Ángel Rozas	10 December 1995 – 10 December 2003	UCR	1999	Roy Nikisch
Roy Nikisch	10 December 2003 – 10 December 2007	UCR	2003	Eduardo Aníbal Moro
Jorge Capitanich	10 December 2007 – 20 November 2013	PJ	2007	Juan Carlos Bacileff Ivanoff
Jorge Capitanich	10 December 2007 – 20 November 2013	PJ	2011	Juan Carlos Bacileff Ivanoff
Juan Carlos Bacileff Ivanoff	20 November 2013 – 27 February 2015	PJ	2011	Vacant
Jorge Capitanich	27 February 2015 – 10 December 2015	PJ	2011	Juan Carlos Bacileff Ivanoff
Domingo Peppo	10 December 2015 – 10 December 2019	PJ	2015	Daniel Capitanich
Jorge Capitanich	10 December 2019 – 10 December 2023	PJ	2019	Analía Rach Quiroga

== See also ==
- Chamber of Deputies of Chaco
