= Jorge Capitanich =

Argentine politician

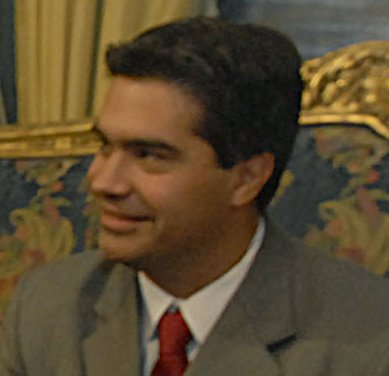

Governor of Chaco
- In office 10 December 2019 – 10 December 2023
- Vice Governor: Analía Rach Quiroga
- Preceded by: Domingo Peppo
- Succeeded by: Leandro Zdero
- In office 10 December 2007 – 10 December 2015; On leave: 20 November 2013 – 27 February 2015
- Vice Governor: Juan Carlos Bacileff Ivanoff
- Preceded by: Roy Nikisch
- Succeeded by: Domingo Peppo

Mayor of Resistencia
- In office 10 December 2015 – 10 December 2019
- Preceded by: Aída Ayala
- Succeeded by: Gustavo Martínez

Chief of the Cabinet of Ministers
- In office 20 November 2013 – 26 February 2015
- President: Cristina Fernández de Kirchner
- Preceded by: Juan Manuel Abal Medina
- Succeeded by: Aníbal Fernández
- In office 2 January 2002 – 3 May 2002
- President: Eduardo Duhalde
- Preceded by: Antonio Cafiero
- Succeeded by: Alfredo Atanasof

National Senator
- In office 10 December 2001 – 10 December 2007
- Constituency: Chaco

Minister of Economy, Social Development, Labour and Health
- In office 21 December 2001 – 23 December 2007
- President: Ramón Puerta
- Preceded by: Domingo Cavallo (as Minister of Economy)
- Succeeded by: Rodolfo Frigeri (as Secretary of the Treasury)

Personal details
- Born: 28 November 1964 (age 61) Presidencia Roque Sáenz Peña, Argentina
- Party: Justicialist Party
- Education: National University of the Northeast; University of Belgrano; University of San Andrés

Jorge Milton Capitanich (born November 28, 1964) is an Argentine politician, businessman, and accountant. He served as Governor of Chaco Province from 2007 to 2013, from February to December 2015, and later from 2019 to 2023. A member of the Justicialist Party, he previously served as Chief of the Cabinet of Ministers from 2013 until 2015, serving under President Cristina Fernández de Kirchner, as intendente (mayor) of Chaco's capital city, Resistencia, and as National Senator, representing Chaco as well. Since 2007 he has also been president of the Club Atlético Sarmiento.

== Early life and education ==
Capitanich (originally Kapitanić) descends from the first Montenegrins who settled in Chaco and created Colonia La Montenegrina, the biggest Montenegrin colony in South America. He was born in Presidencia Roque Sáenz Peña, the son of Daniel (Danilo) Capitanich and Milka Popovich, who owned a small farm. The family hails from Banjani.

He attended the National University of the Northeast, graduating with a degree in accountancy in 1988. He earned a post-graduate degree in public administration from the University of Belgrano in 1991, and taught in his discipline. In 1999 he obtained a master's degree in Economics and Political Science at the School of Economics and Business Administration.

== Career ==
=== Early political career ===
Capitanich took up his first position in politics in 1987, serving as private secretary to the Governor of Chaco province, Danilo Baroni,

Capitanich thereafter experienced a quick rise through the government ranks. In 1994 he was named coordinator of a private-sector jobs-creation program in the Ministry of Assistance for the Reform of the Provincial Economy. The next year he became assistant secretary for technical-administrative coordination in the Ministry of Social Development. In 1998, he was appointed assistant secretary of social projects in the Ministry of Social Development. And in 2001, he was named Minister of Infrastructure.

=== Senate ===
Capitanich was elected Senator for Chaco in October 2001, and named Argentina's interim Minister of Economy of Argentina during the institutional crisis of December 21 of that year, serving for two days in the post. President Eduardo Duhalde appointed Capitanich Chief of the Cabinet of Ministers on January 2, 2002. While in that position under Duhalde, Capitanich was involved in the consulting firm M-Unit, for which he was accused of arranging covert government financing. He worked at M-Unit with Economy Minister Axel Kicillof, with whom he collaborated on a book. Capitanich held the position of Cabinet Chief until May 2002.

He retained his Senate seat, and supported President Néstor Kirchner's Front for Victory. In 2003 he stood to be governor of Chaco, but was defeated by Roy Nikisch of the Radical Civic Union.

=== Governor ===
In the 2007 provincial elections, Capitanich ran as a candidate for governor for the Frente Chaco Deserves More, an alliance of several parties with the majority weight of the Justicialist Party. On 16, 2007, he was elected governor of the Province of Chaco, defeating the candidate of the ruling party and former governor Ángel Rozas, belonging to the Radical Civic Union, against the initial estimates of the polls. In 2008 he received recognition from the Konex Awards for his career as a legislator in the "Institutions - Community - Company" category.8

In the elections of September 18, 2011, he obtained his re-election as governor by obtaining more than 66% of the votes.

In his 2013 session opening speech, Capitanich listed the achievements of his management, among which are: the province's cumulative growth rate in the 2003-2011 period was 78.5% and 38% if you consider the period 2009–2013. There was a reduction in provincial debt and growth in formal private employment.

In the area of education, illiteracy fell from 8.8 to 5.4%. In terms of educational infrastructure, 12 schools were built, expanded and refurbished for more than 6,000 students, at different levels.

As far as health is concerned, during his government 25 new hospitals were inaugurated, a historical record for the province. Infant mortality went from 20.9 per thousand to 14.4 per thousand in 2011.

In the period 2008–2015, the number of routes built will be equivalent to 430 km. During his government, the work of the collector on National Route 16 was completed, which required an investment of more than 259 million pesos and which included the construction of embankments. and shoulders. Also, the first section of the highway that connects Resistencia with Makallé, which required an investment of 160 million pesos and works on provincial route No. 13 with an investment of almost 539 million pesos.

In addition, the works of the "Néstor Kirchner" Sports Complex, a Community Integration Center (CIC), a health module, the new micro-stadium of the Fontana Social and Sports Club, and housing for the Tobas were carried out.

== Controversies ==
In November 2013, La Nación described Capitanich's career as being "punctuated by harsh allegations of corruption."

While Capitanich was working in the government of Chaco province, his office allegedly “funneled money to the media through third parties, and left hefty sums on the road by way of unnecessary fees and unnecessary middlemen,” according to charges leveled by Deputy Carlos Ullrich. Capitanich also reportedly misdirected funds belonging to Santa Cruz province in a matter involving oil royalties.

The newspaper Norte reported in May 2002 that Capitanich had been involved in irregularities involving an offshore bank. Capitanich was also accused of tax avoidance in connection with his ownership or part ownership of a Buenos Aires-based firm called Agronea SA. In addition, he supposedly arranged “special pensions” for his parents and, in August 2009, while serving as Governor of Chaco, falsely registered his mother, Mirca Popovich, as a resident of the province in order to avoid having to pay for 30,000 pesos' worth of medical treatment, an action that violated laws against forgery, registration of a false address, and other crimes. When this offense was discovered and reported, Capitanich threatened to sue the newspaper that reported it, but he then held a press conference at which he admitted to having committed the offense and promised to pay for the medical treatment. Critics regarded his actions as particularly heinous given that Chaco is a very poor province while Capitanich was prosperous enough to afford to spend 300,000 pesos on his daughter's fifteenth birthday.

== Honors and awards ==
In 1997 Capitanich received the Annual ADEBA (Association of Argentine Banks) Award for efficiency in social spending.

In 2008 he was given a Konex Award in recognition of his career as a senator.

== Personal life ==
Capitanich and Sandra Mendoza have two daughters together.

Political offices
Preceded by Domingo Cavallo	Minister of Economy; Acting; 2001	Succeeded by Rodolfo Frigeri
Preceded by Antonio Cafiero	Chief of the Cabinet of Ministers; 2002	Succeeded by Alfredo Atanasof
Preceded by Roy Nikisch	Governor of Chaco; 2007–2013	Succeeded by Juan Carlos Bacileff Ivanoff
Preceded by Juan Manuel Abal Medina	Chief of the Cabinet of Ministers; 2013–2015	Succeeded by Aníbal Fernández
Preceded by Juan Carlos Bacileff Ivanoff	Governor of Chaco; 2015	Succeeded by Domingo Peppo
Preceded by Aída Ayala	Mayor of Resistencia; 2015–2019	Succeeded by Gustavo Martínez
Preceded by Domingo Peppo	Governor of Chaco; 2019–2023	Succeeded by Leandro Zdero
