= National University of the Northeast =

Coordinates: 27°27′50″S 58°50′22″W

- Universidad Nacional del Nordeste
- Motto: Qualitatum, Eqelentia et Pertinanti
- Motto in English: Quality, Excellence and Pertinence
- Type: Public
- Established: 1956
- Chancellor: Ing. Eduardo del Valle
- Faculty: 4,542
- Students: 53,308
- Location: Corrientes/ Resistencia, Chaco and Corrientes Provinces, Argentina
- Campus: Corrientes, Resistencia and Saenz Peña
- Website: http://www.unne.edu.ar/

The National University of the Northeast (Spanish: Universidad Nacional del Nordeste, UNNE) is an Argentine national university. It is located in the cities of Corrientes and Resistencia, capital cities of the Provinces of Corrientes and Chaco respectively, and was established on December 4, 1956. Known as the University of the Sun, it was the seventh-largest university in Argentina by student enrollment numbers as of 2017.

== Schools ==
- Faculty of Architecture and Urbanism
- Faculty of Arts
- Faculty of Agrarian and Forest Sciences
- Faculty of Agroindustry
- Faculty of Economic Sciences
- Faculty of Exact Sciences

The Faculty of Exact Sciences consists of 9 academic departments; namely Agricultural Science, Biology, Biochemistry, Physics, Humanities, Informatics, Engineering, Mathematics and Chemistry. These departments offer undergraduate and post-graduate courses. Innovative dual language post-graduate courses have been taught in the faculty of mathematics by internationally distinguished professors such as Bharath Sriraman on topics of Theories and Philosophies of Mathematics Education.

- Faculty of Law
- Faculty of Medical Sciences
- Faculty of Natural Sciences and Museum
- Faculty of Veterinary Sciences
- Faculty of Humanities and Social Sciences
- Faculty of Informatics
- Faculty of Engineering
- Faculty of Odontology

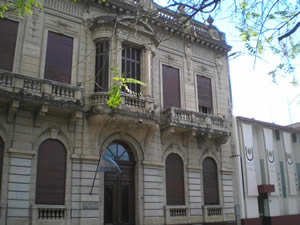
Administrative offices in Corrientes

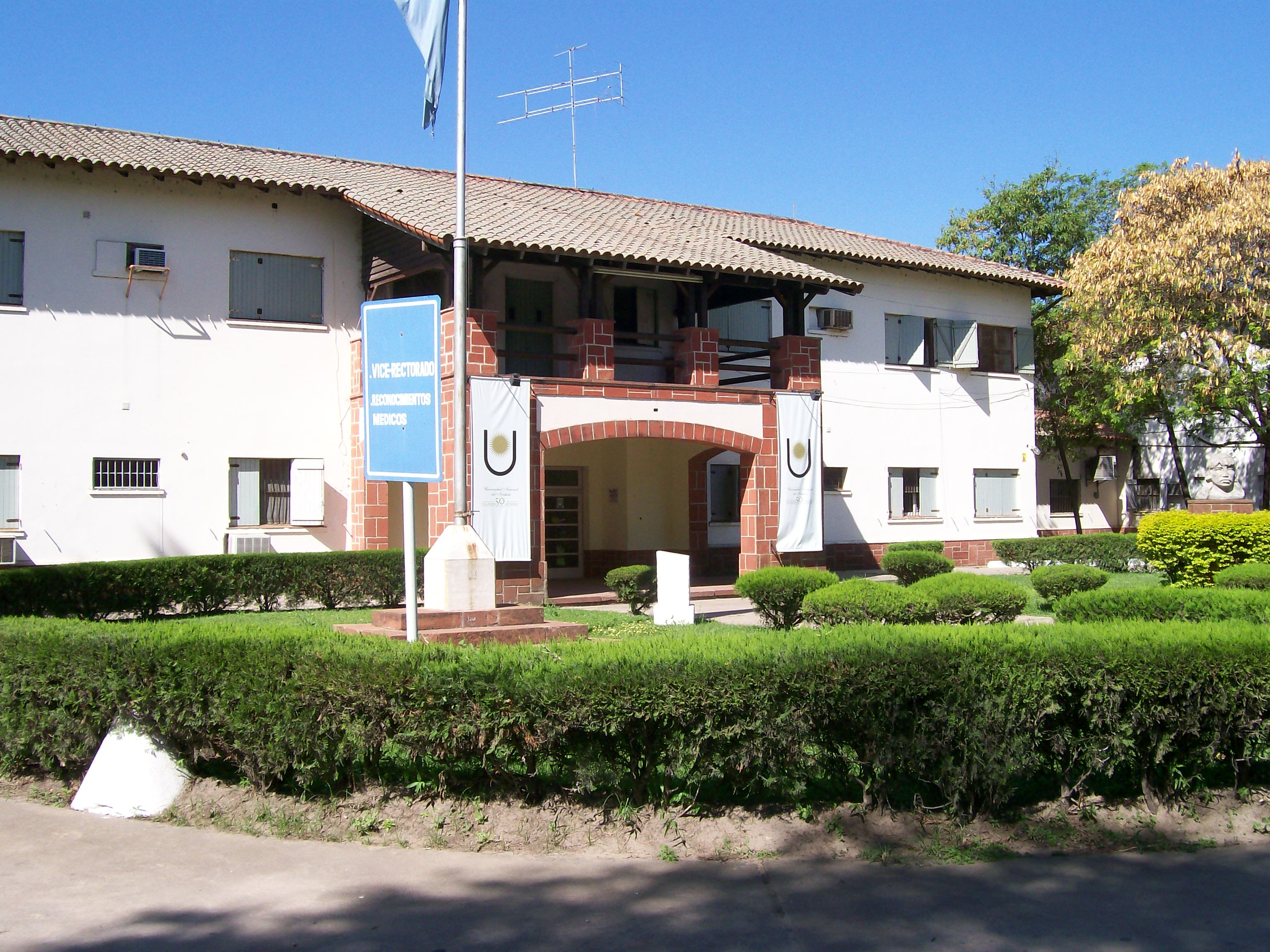
Administrative offices in Resistencia

== See also ==
- List of Argentine universities
- Science and technology in Argentina
