= 2018 G20 Buenos Aires summit =

13th meeting of the G20

2018 G20 Buenos Aires Summit 13th G20 Summit
- 30 November – 1 December 2018

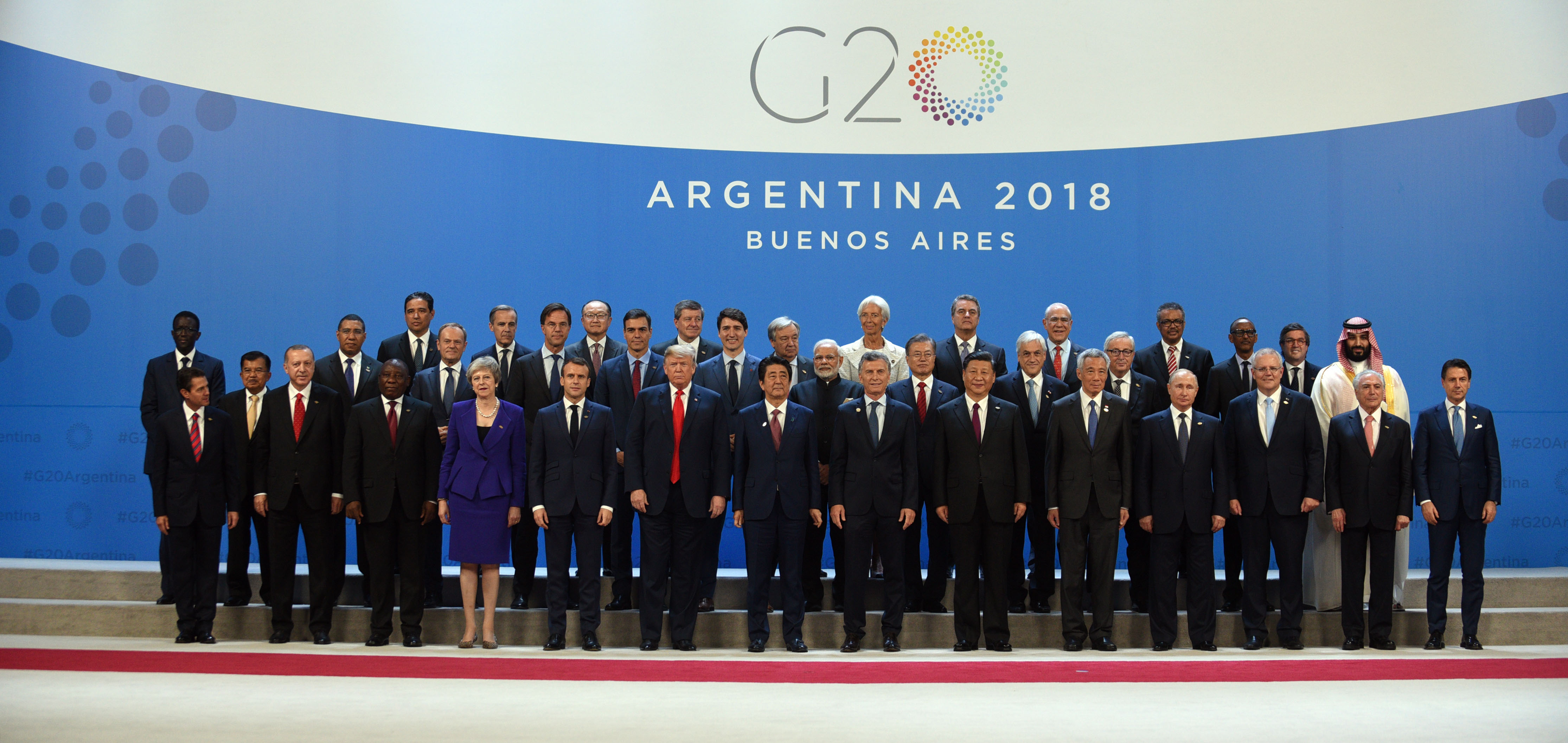
- 2018 G20 summit attendees.:
- Host country: Argentina
- Motto: Financial Markets and The World Economy.::
- Cities: Buenos Aires; Córdoba; & etc.:
- Venues: Costa Salguero Center
- Participants: G20 members.: Guest invitees:-): Spain; Chile; Jamaica; Senegal; Netherlands; Cameroon; & Singapore.:: Invited bodies: United Nations; African Union; And many others.:
- Chair: Mauricio Macri

The 2018 G20 Buenos Aires Summit was the thirteenth meeting of the Group of Twenty (G20), held in the city of Buenos Aires, Argentina. It was the first G20 summit to be hosted in South America.

== Preparations ==
Argentine president Mauricio Macri of Argentina assumed the one-year G20 presidency on 30 November 2017, during an official ceremony at the Kirchner Cultural Centre in Buenos Aires. Chinese leader Xi Jinping (2016 host), German chancellor Angela Merkel (2017 host), and Japanese prime minister Shinzo Abe (2019 host) all sent messages of support, which were shown at the ceremony.

The first G20 meetings of the Argentine Presidency began in Bariloche in early December 2017. They were attended by central bank deputy governors and deputy ministers of finance, as well as the sherpas. During the buildup to the G20 Summit between world leaders on 30 November 2018, Argentina hosted over 45 meetings at various government levels and areas in 11 different cities throughout the country.

== Participating leaders ==
List of leaders who took part in the 2018 G20 Buenos Aires summit:

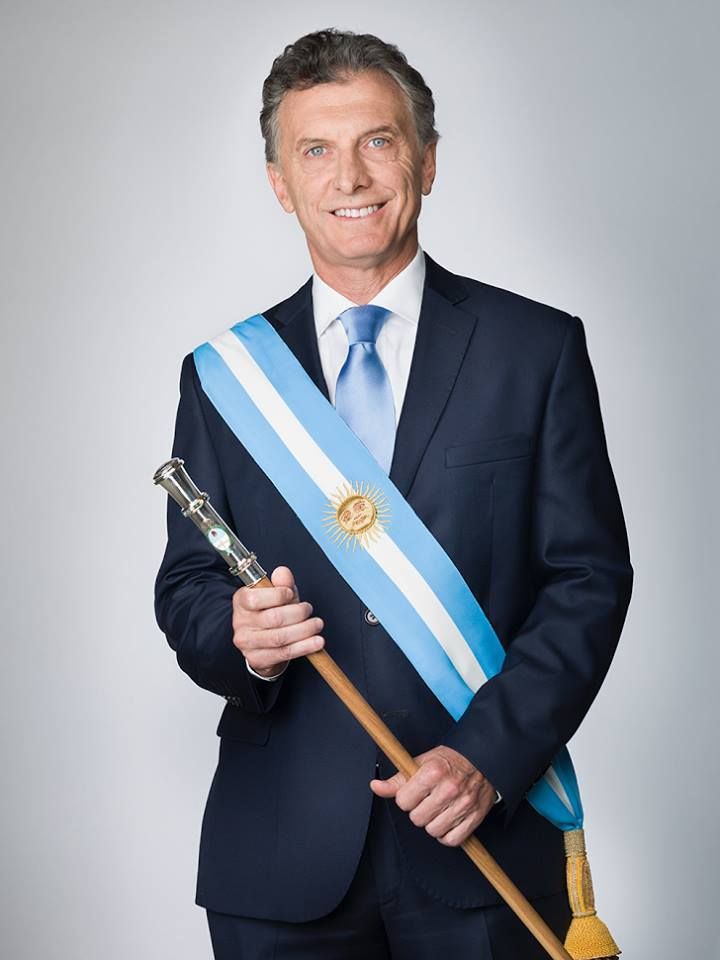
Argentina
Mauricio Macri, President (host)

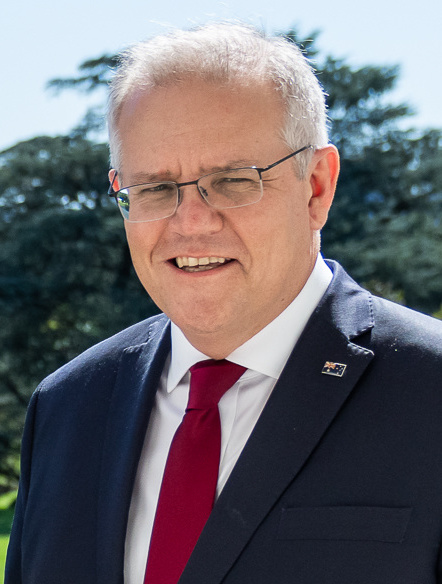
Australia
Scott Morrison, Prime Minister

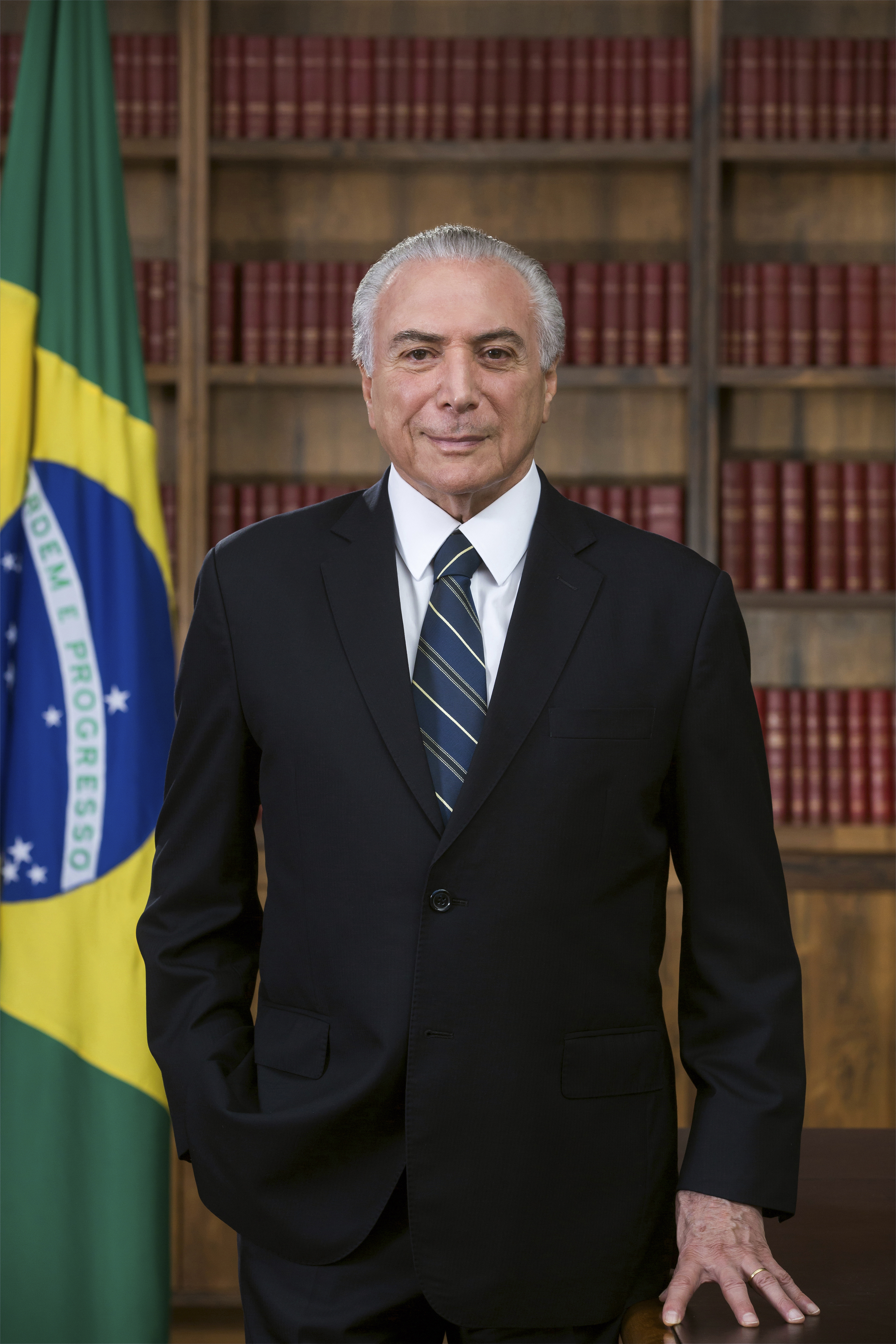
Brazil
Michel Temer, President

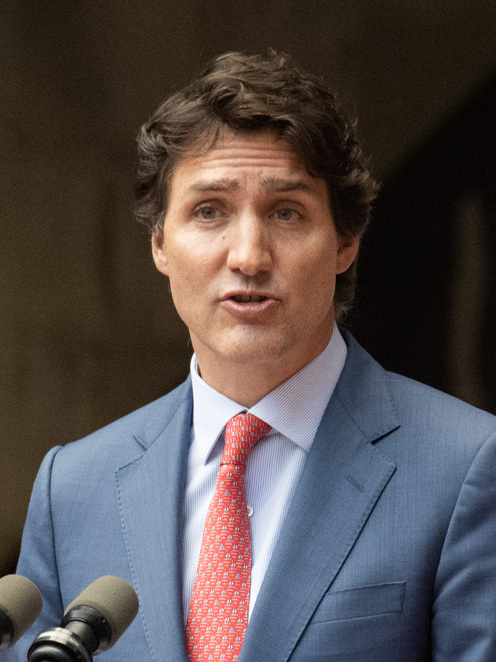
Canada
Justin Trudeau, Prime Minister

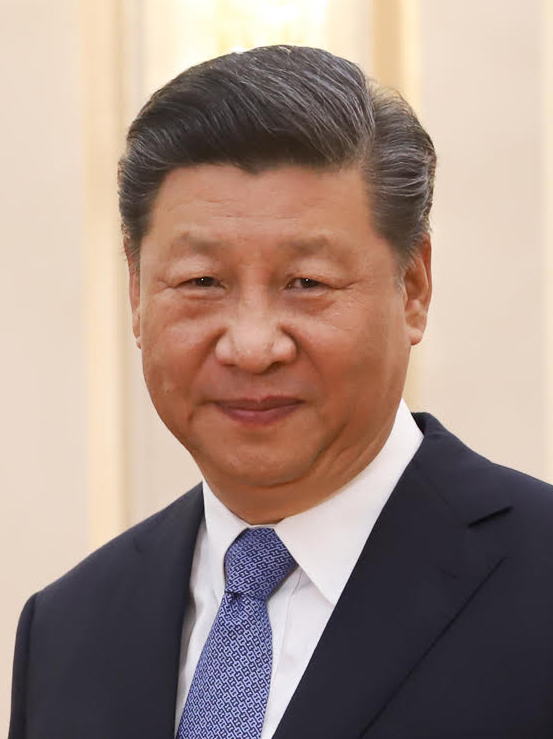
China
Xi Jinping, President

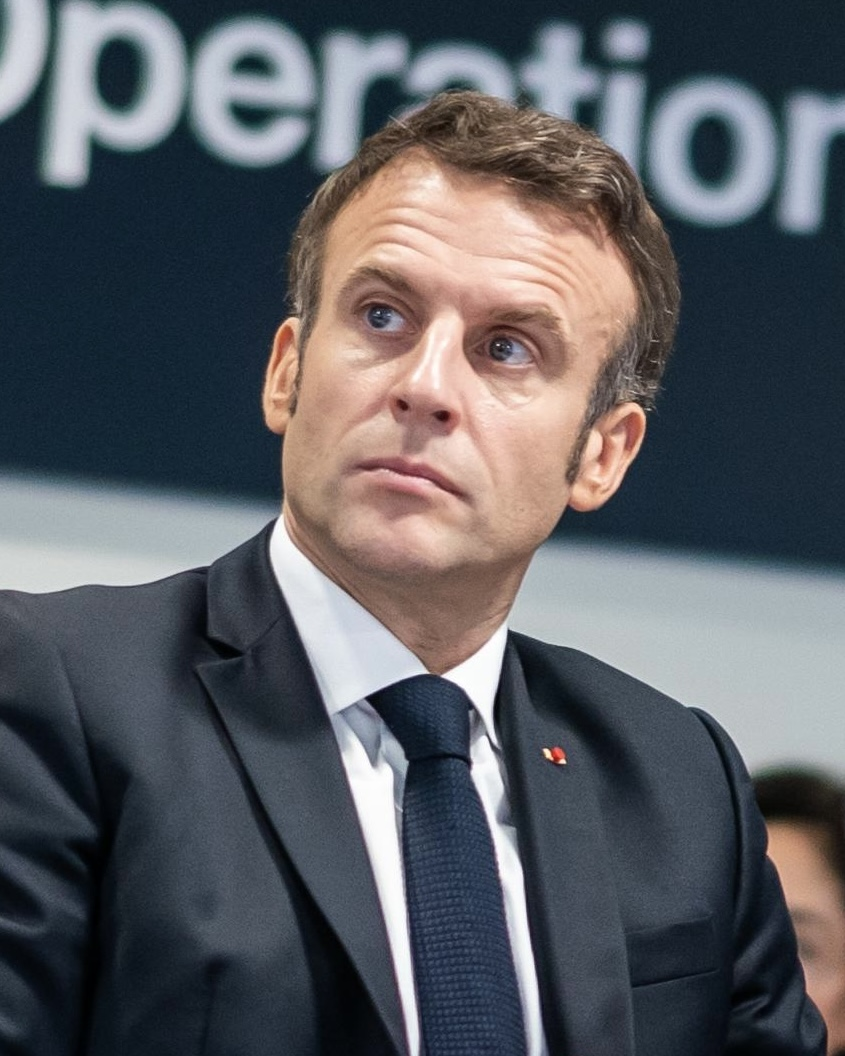
France
Emmanuel Macron, President

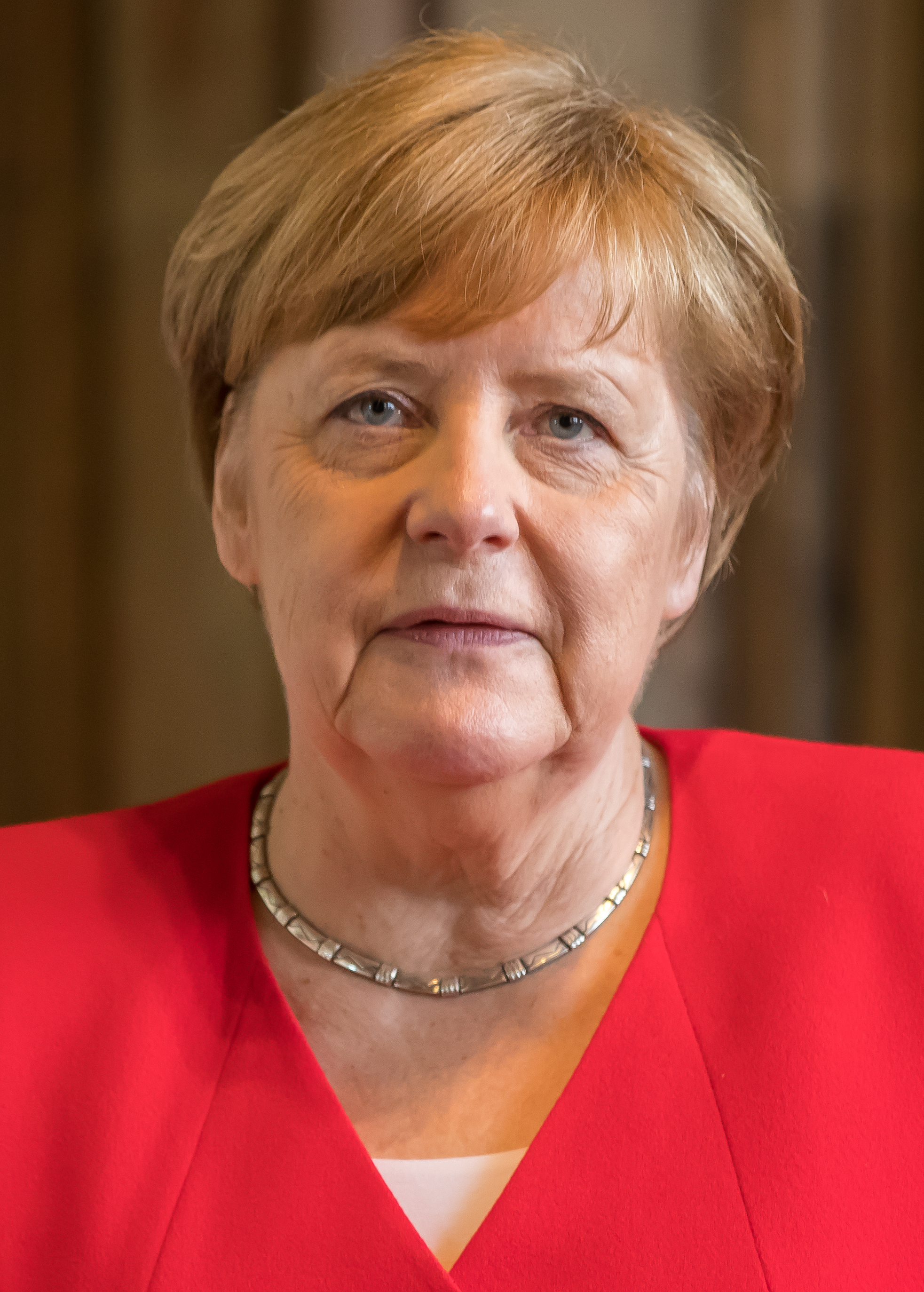
Germany
Angela Merkel, Chancellor

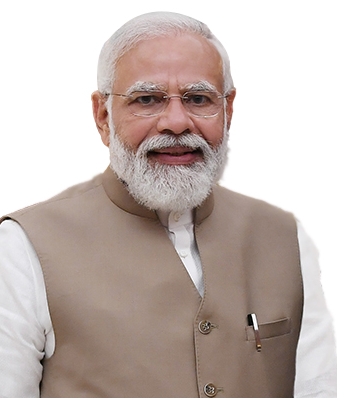
India
Narendra Modi, Prime Minister

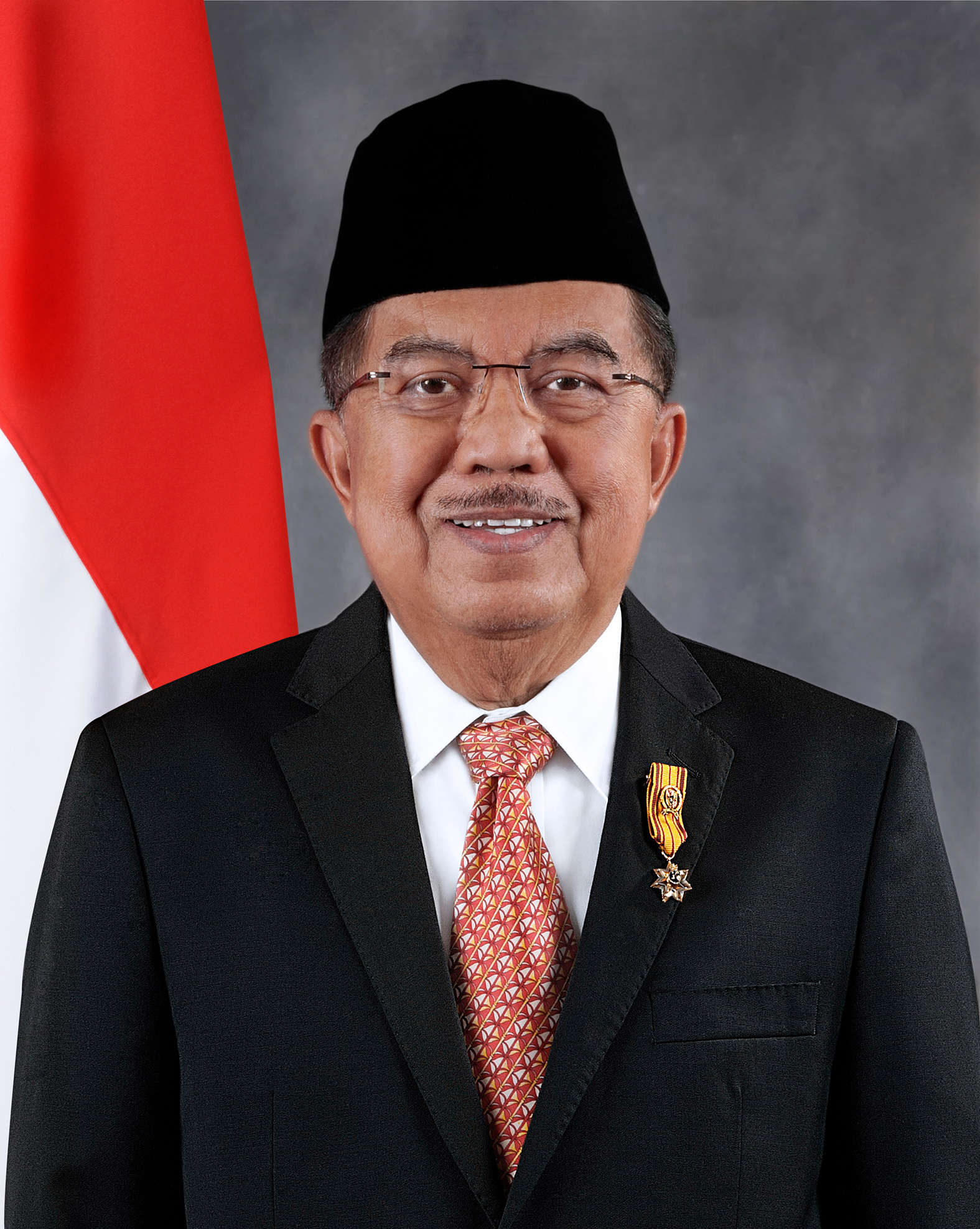
Indonesia
Jusuf Kalla, Vice President

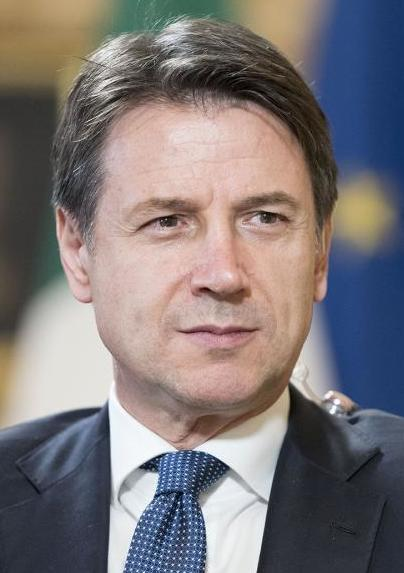
Italy
Giuseppe Conte, Prime Minister

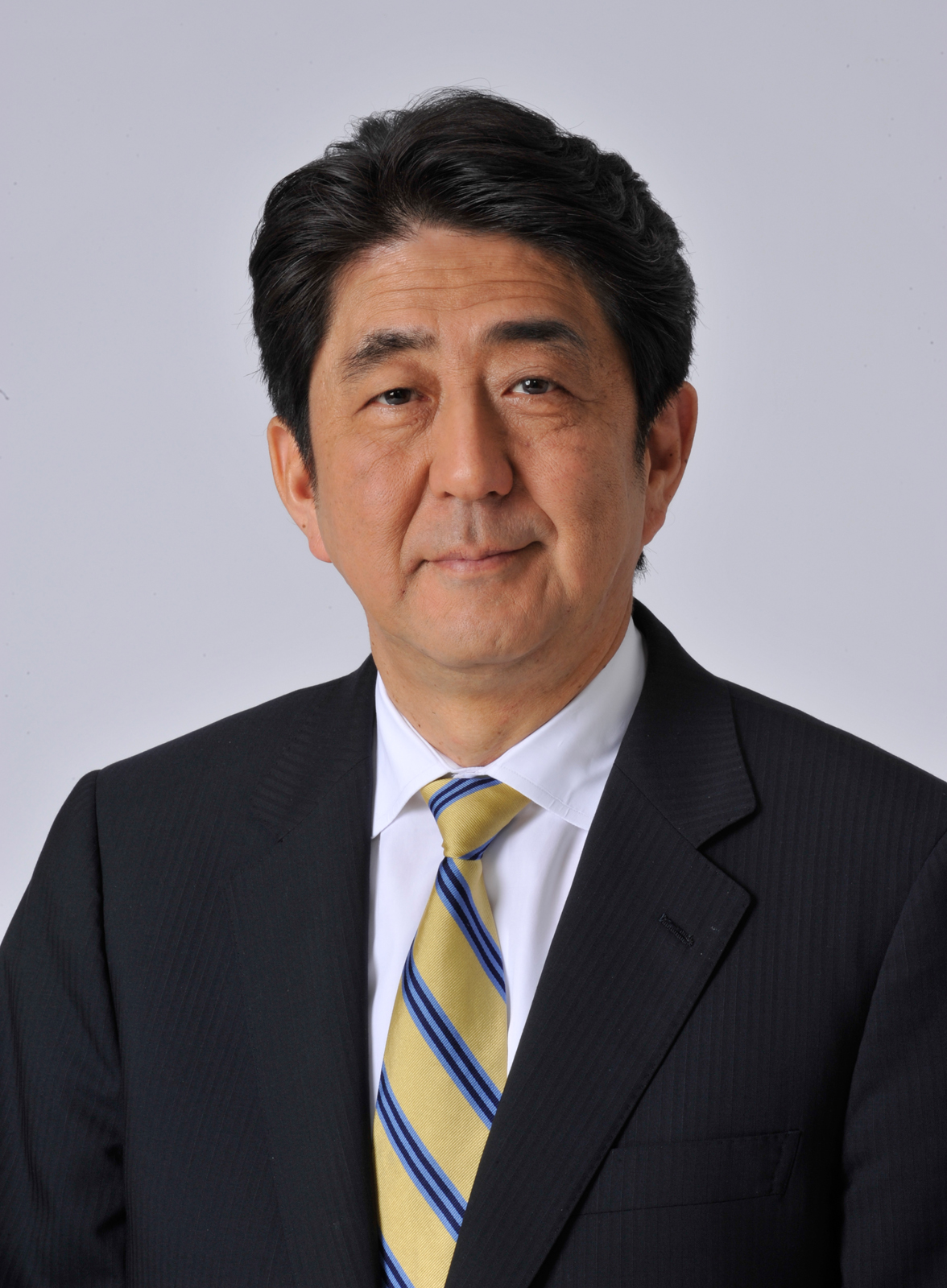
Japan
Shinzō Abe, Prime Minister

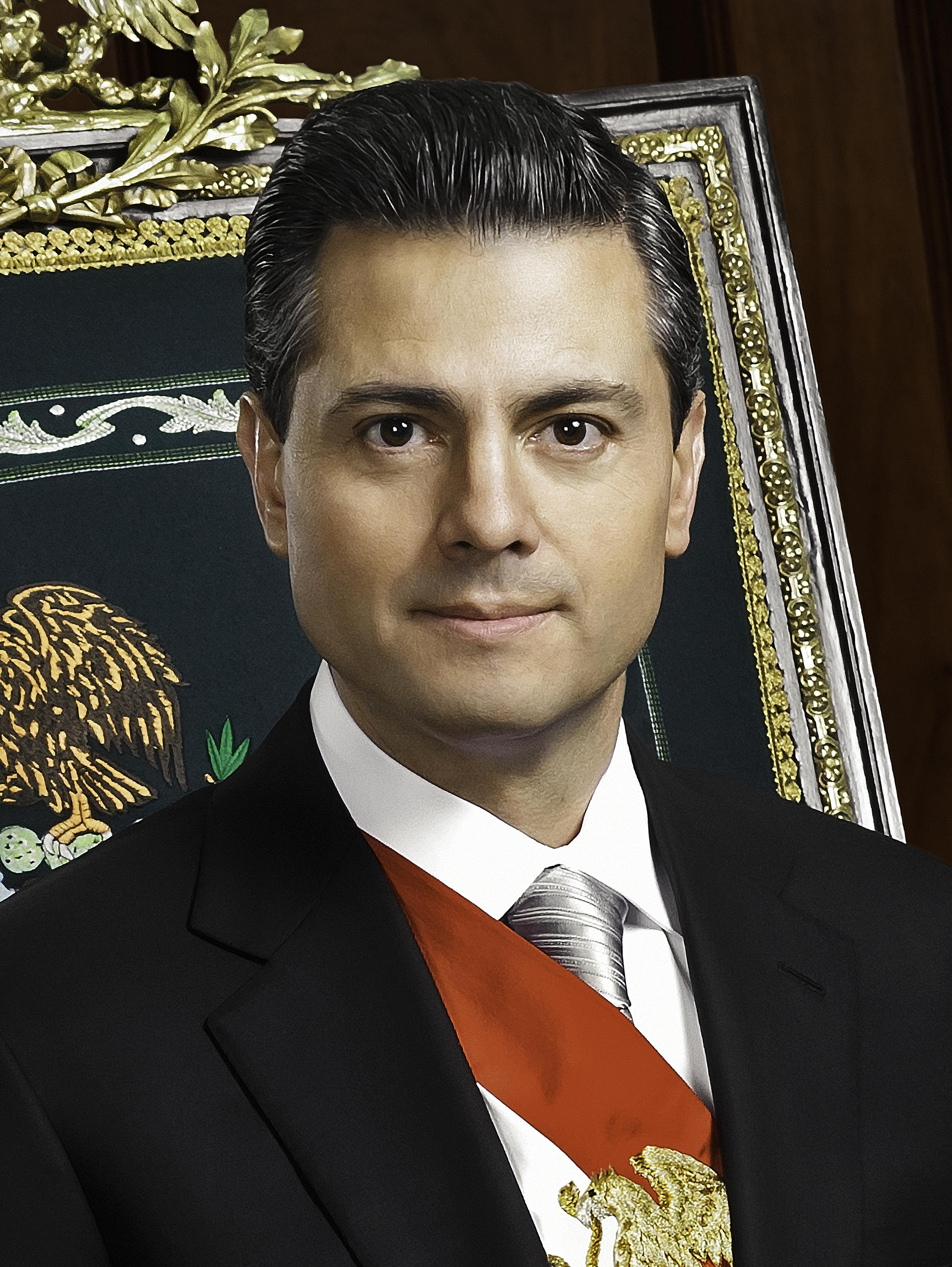
Mexico
Enrique Peña Nieto, President

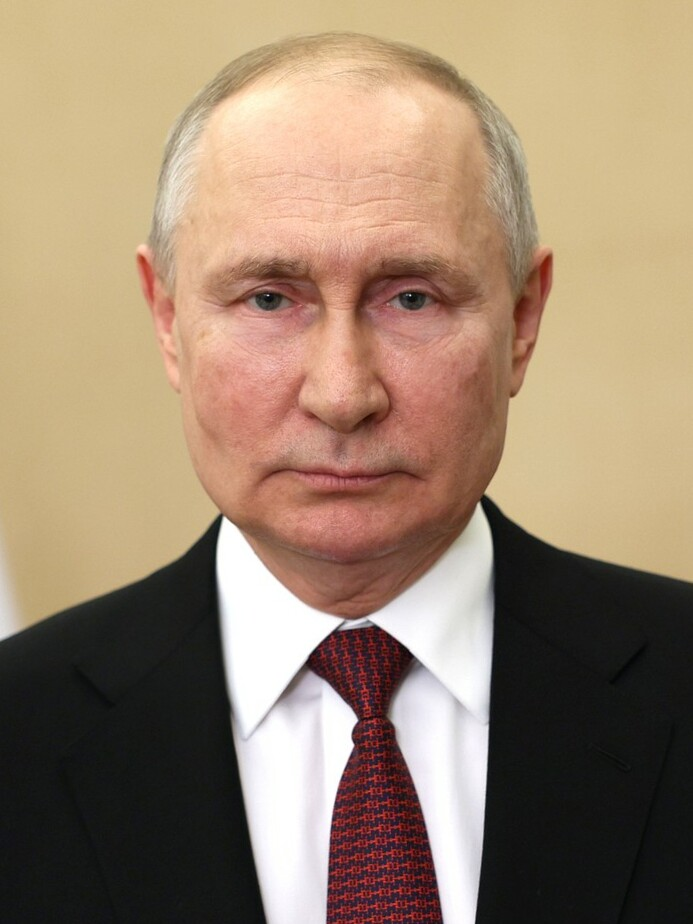
Russia
Vladimir Putin, President

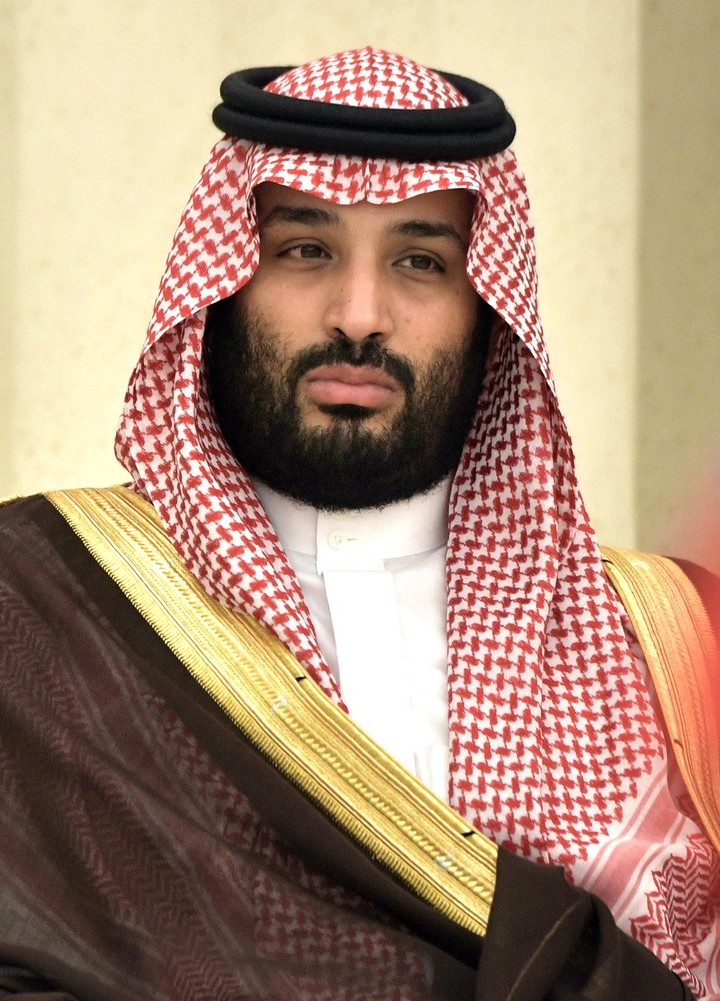
Saudi Arabia
Mohammad bin Salman, Crown Prince

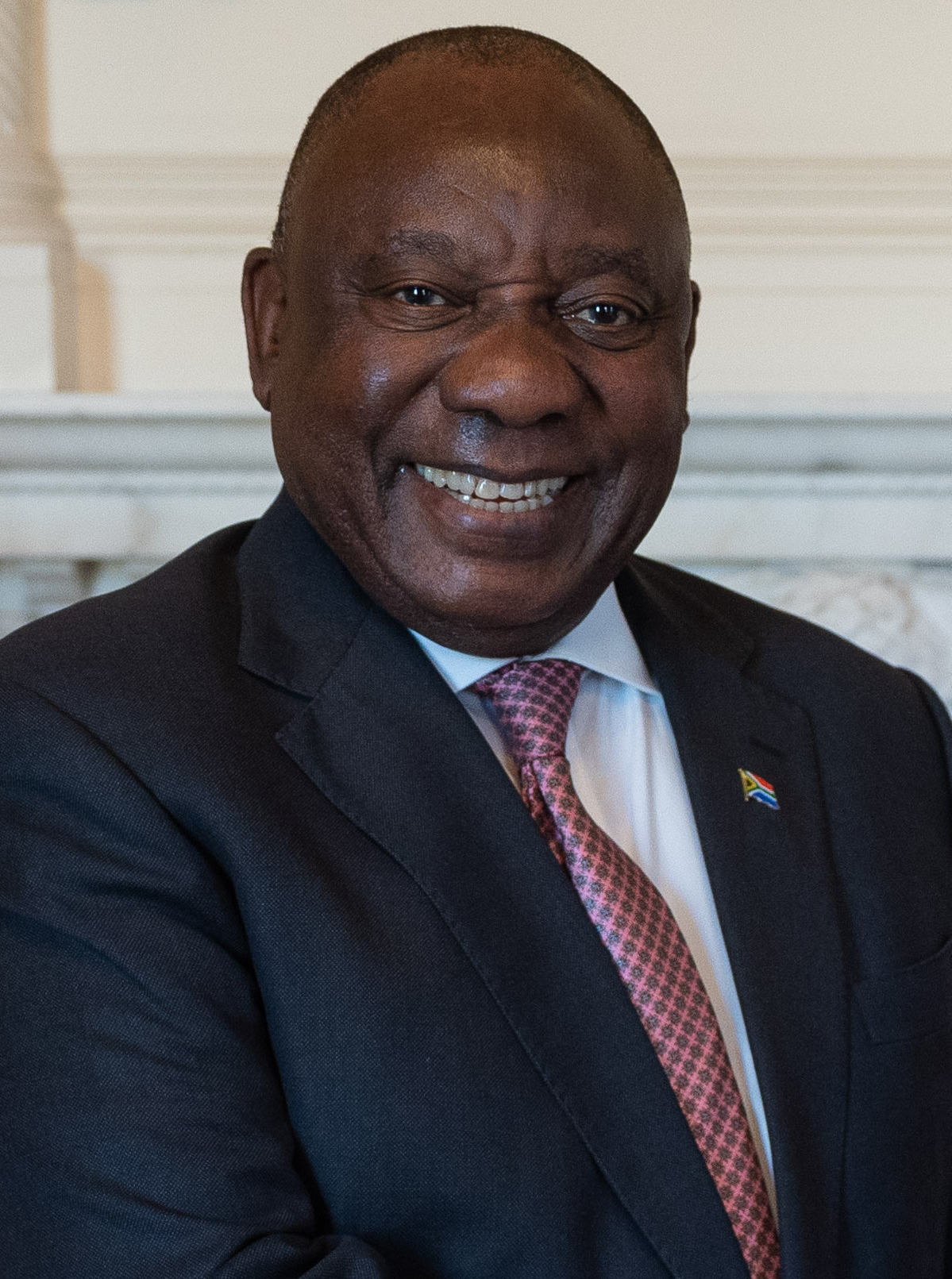
South Africa
Cyril Ramaphosa, President

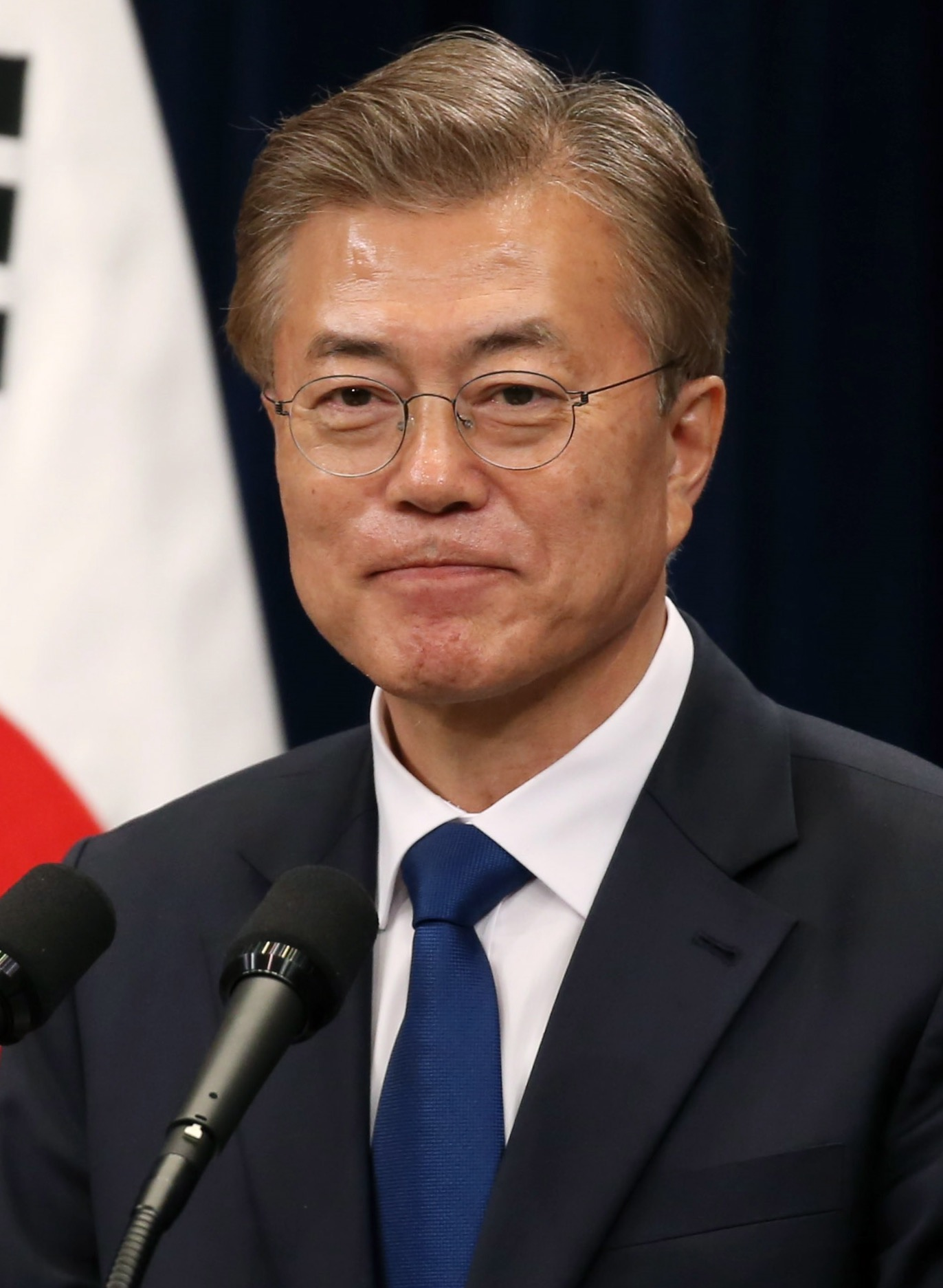
Republic of Korea
Moon Jae-in, President

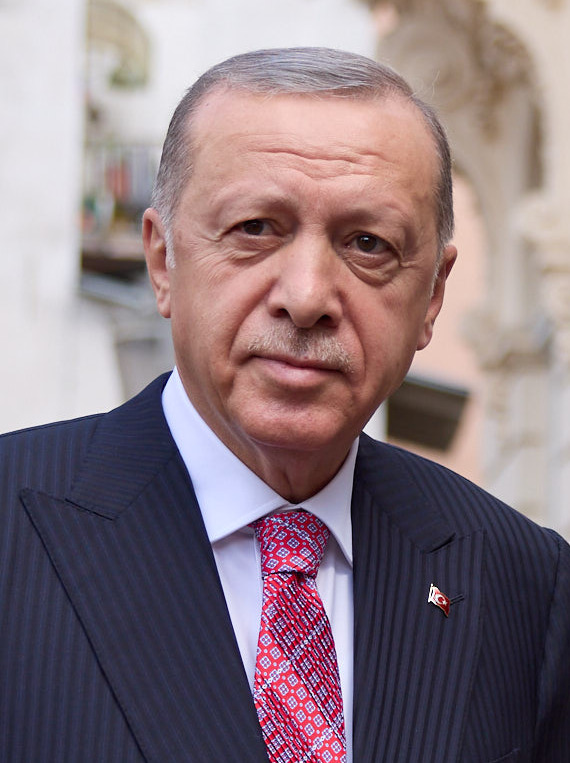
Turkey
Recep Tayyip Erdoğan, President

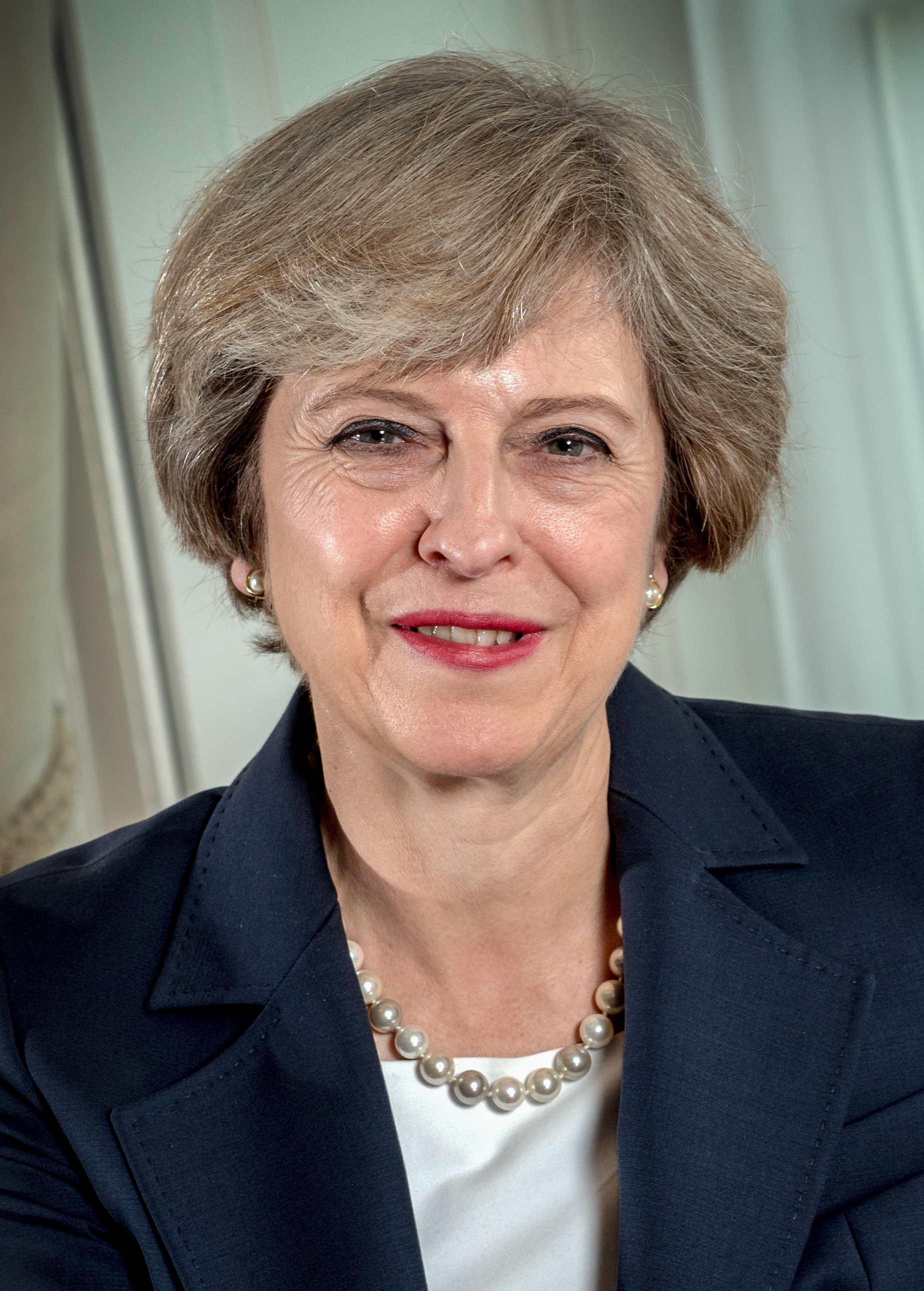
United Kingdom
Theresa May, Prime Minister

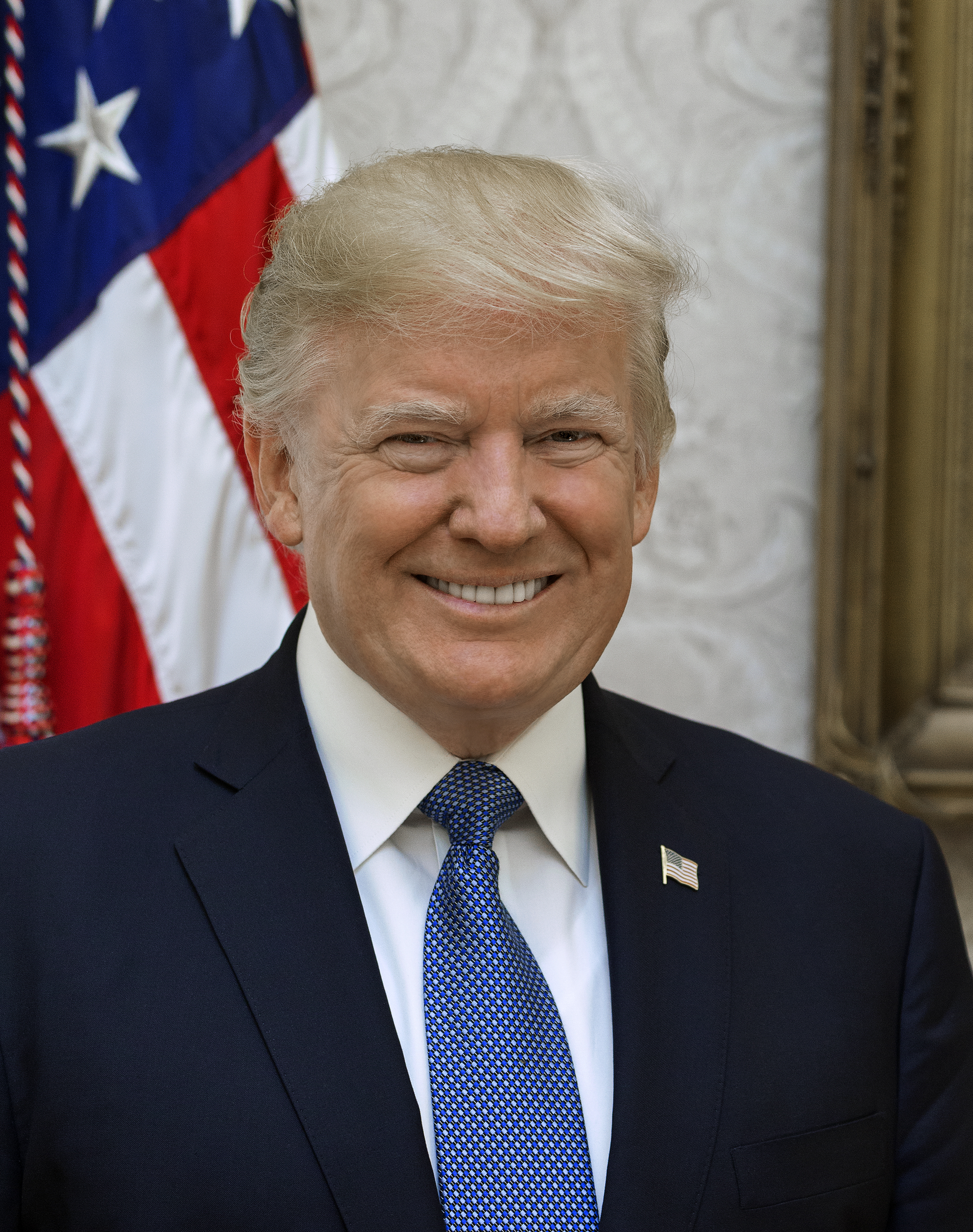
United States
Donald Trump, President

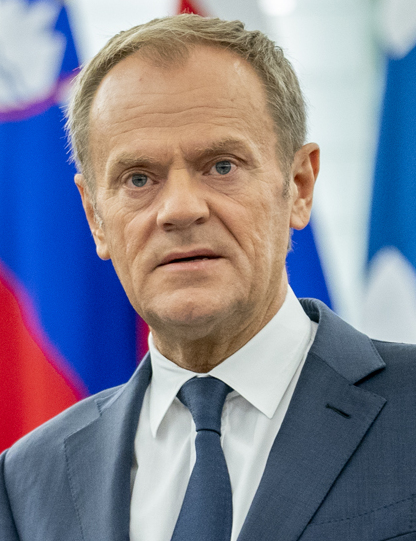
European Union
Donald Tusk, President of the European Council

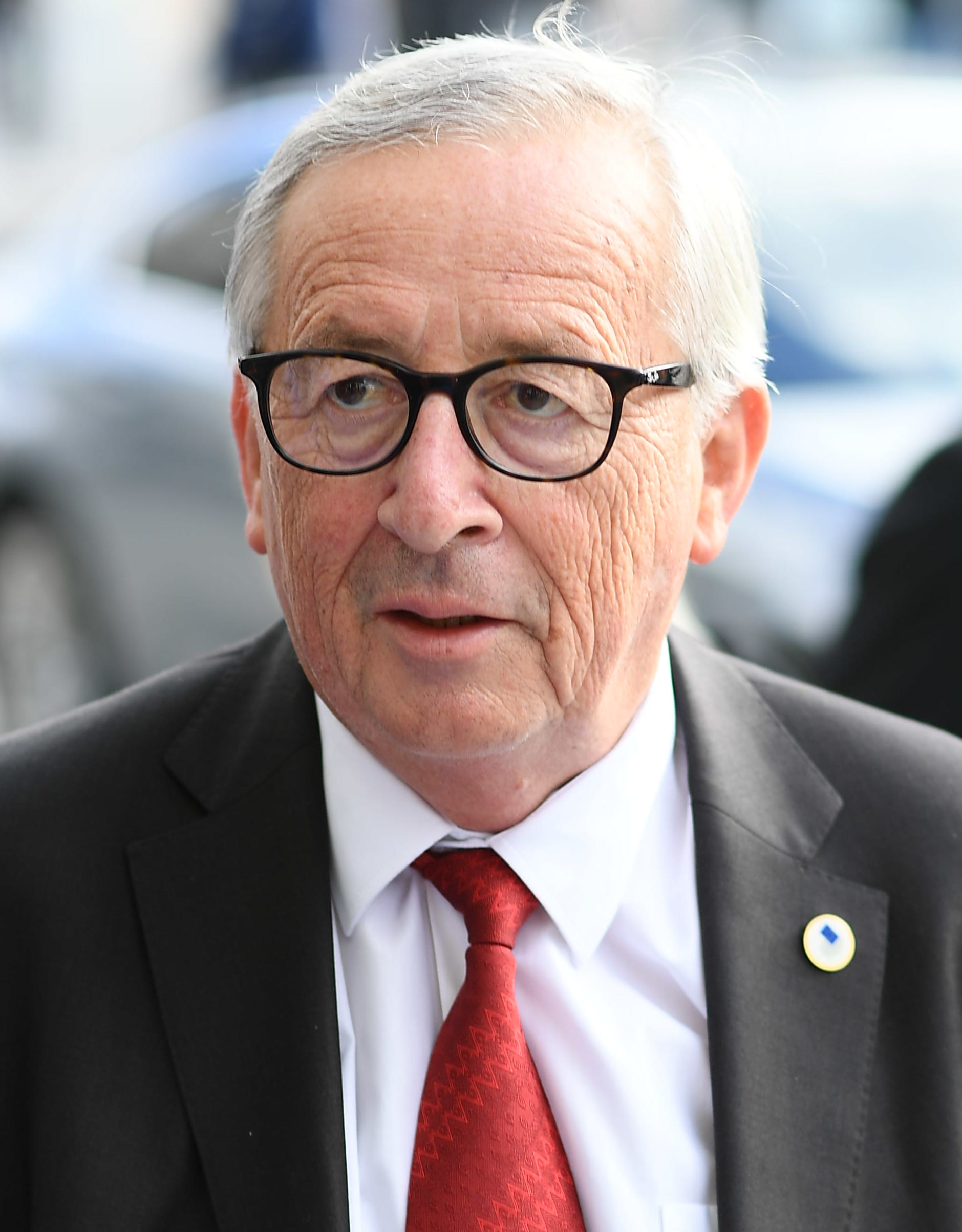
European Union
Jean-Claude Juncker, President of the European Commission

=== Participating guests ===
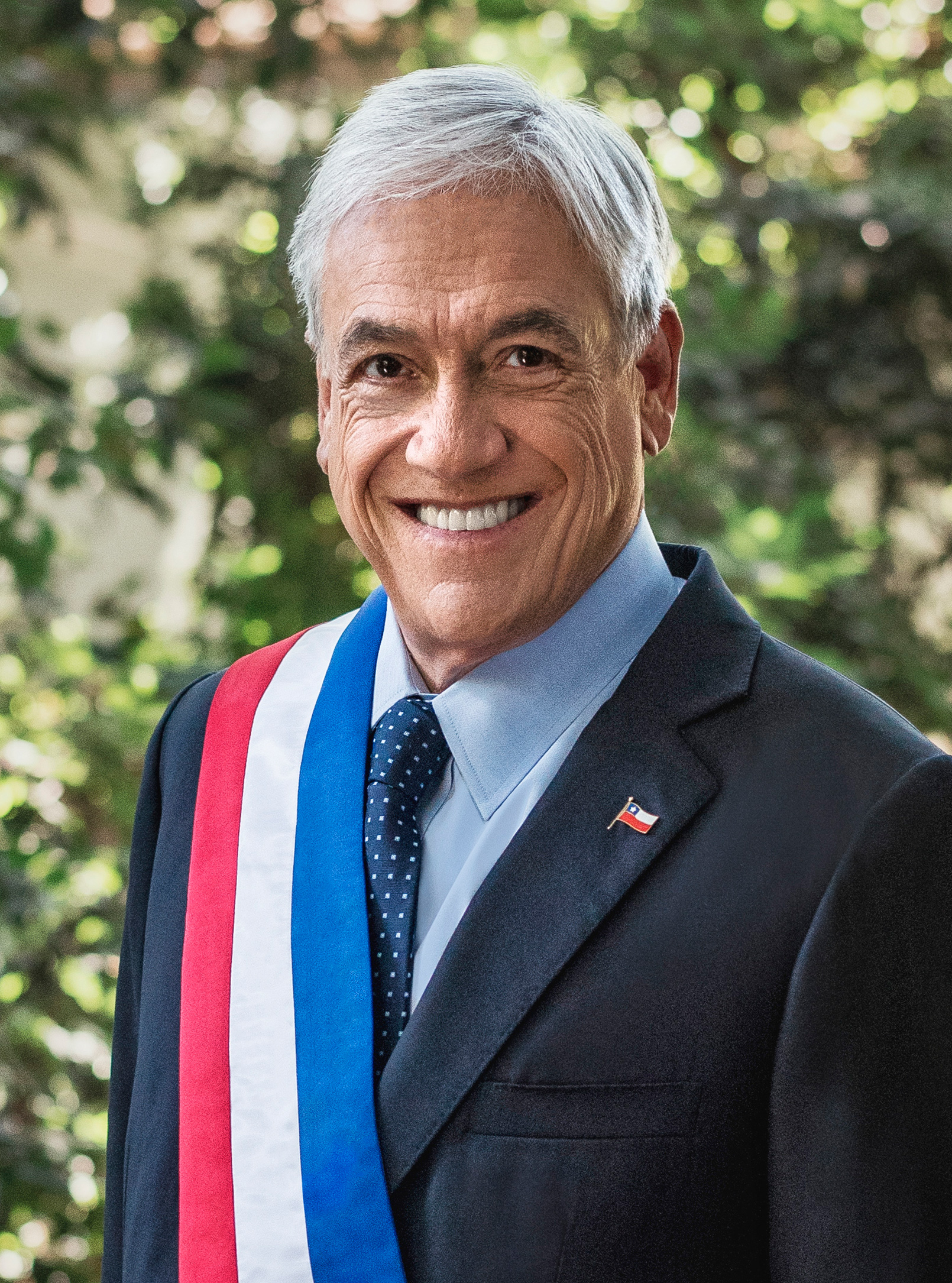
Chile
Sebastián Piñera, President, Guest Invitee

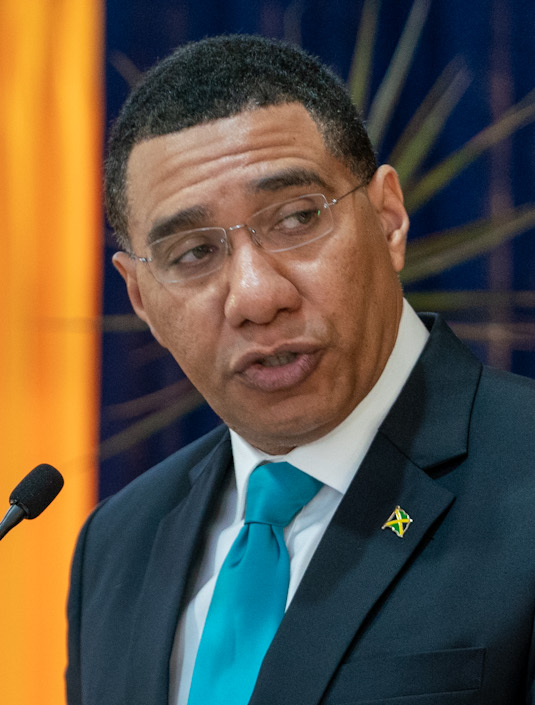
Jamaica
Andrew Holness, Prime Minister, 2018 chairperson of CARICOM

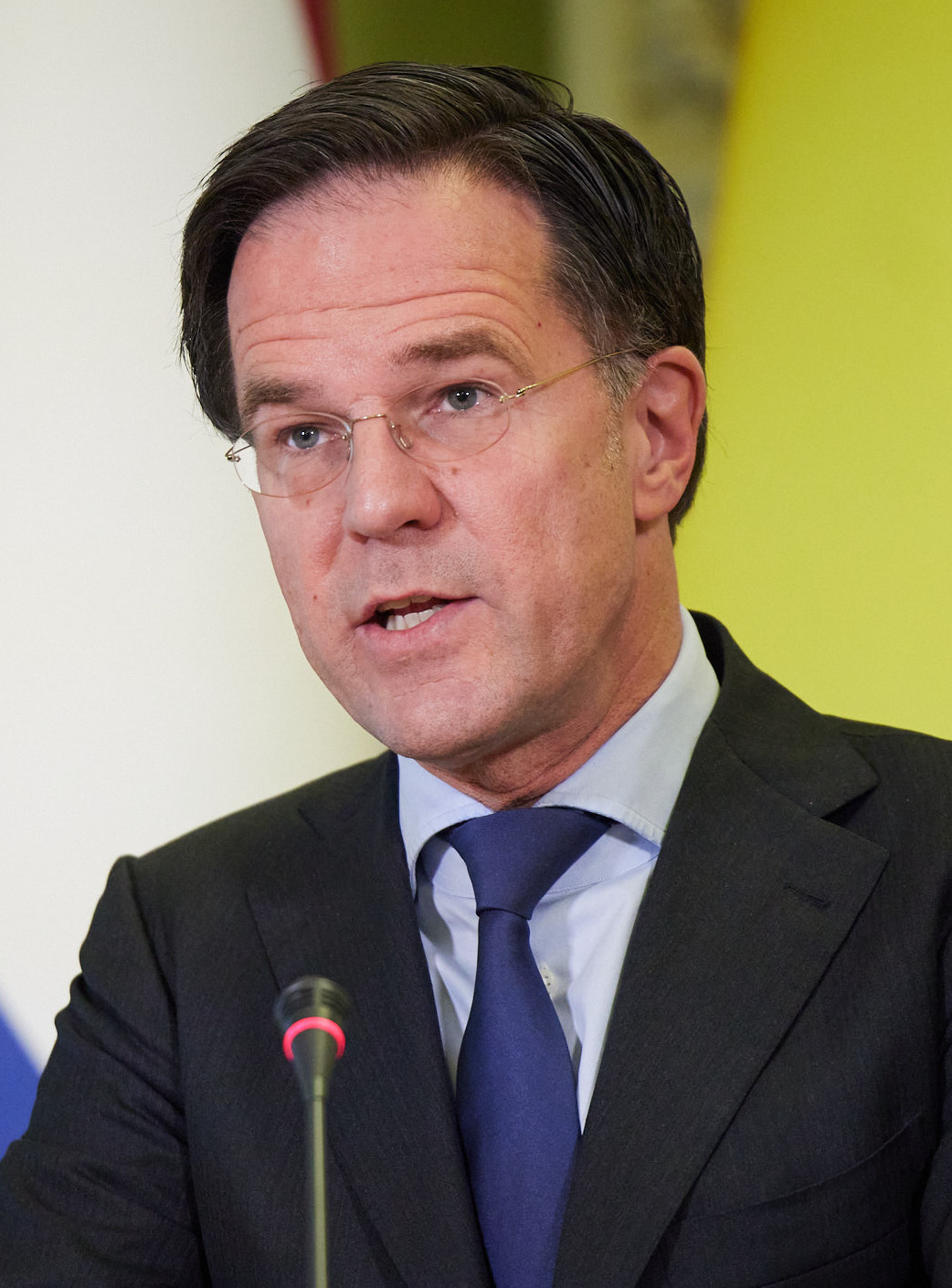
Netherlands
Mark Rutte, Prime Minister, Guest Invitee

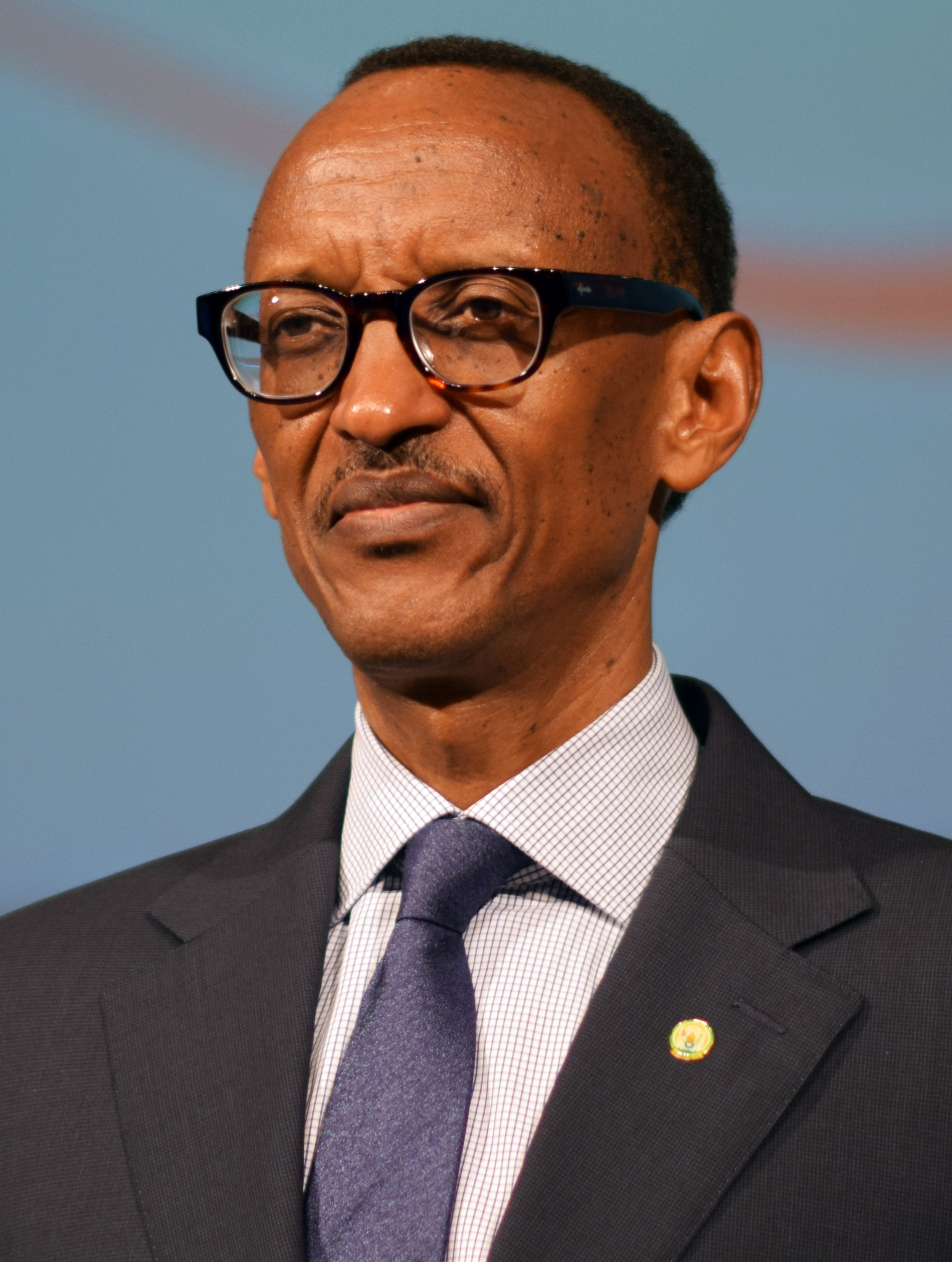
Rwanda
Paul Kagame, President, 2018 chairperson of the African Union

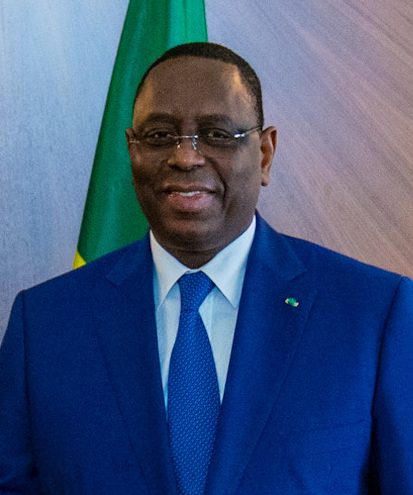
Senegal
Macky Sall, President, 2018 chairperson of the New Partnership for Africa's Development

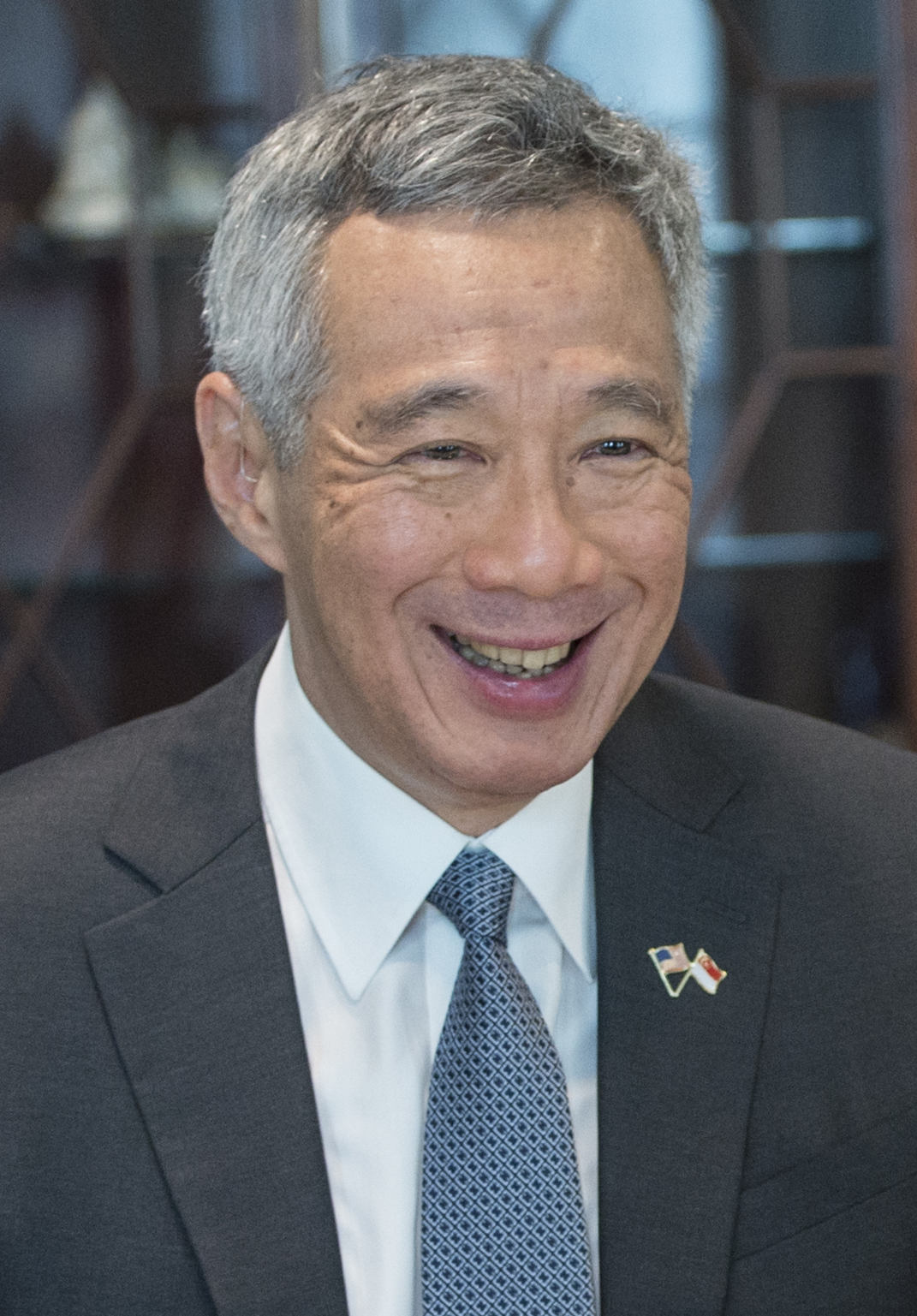
Singapore
Lee Hsien Loong, Prime Minister, 2018 chairperson of the Association of Southeast Asian Nations

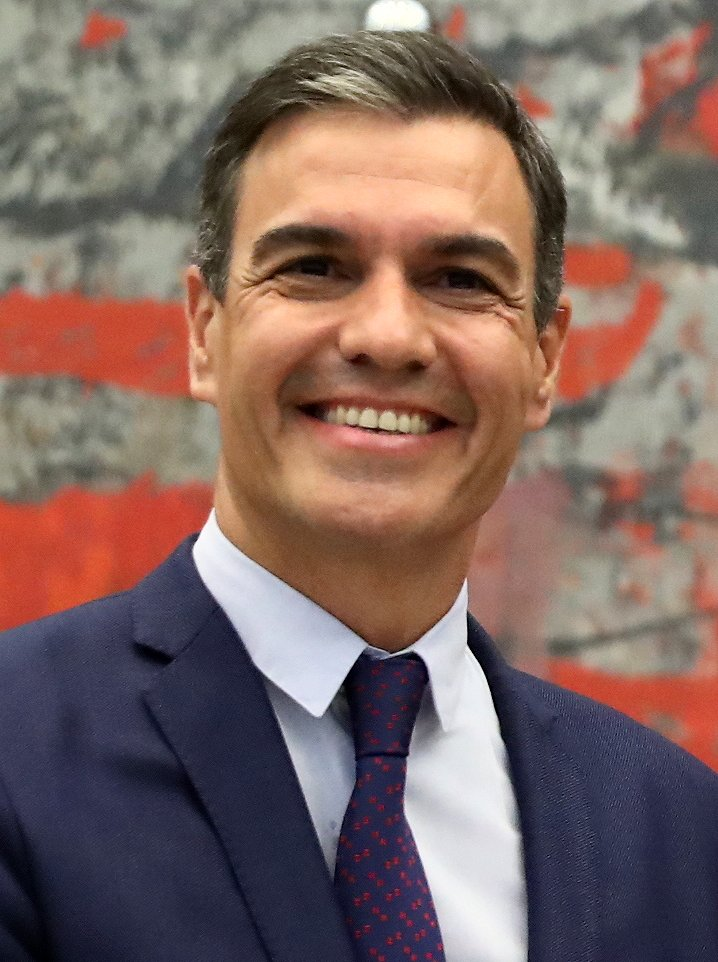
Spain
Pedro Sánchez, Prime Minister, Permanent Guest Invitee

As the host nation, Argentina invited additional guest countries and international organizations at its discretion to participate in 2018 G20 meetings. The countries invited by Argentina are Chile and the Netherlands. International organizations invited by Argentina are the Caribbean Community (represented by Jamaica), the Inter-American Development Bank, and the Development Bank of Latin America and the Caribbean (CAF).

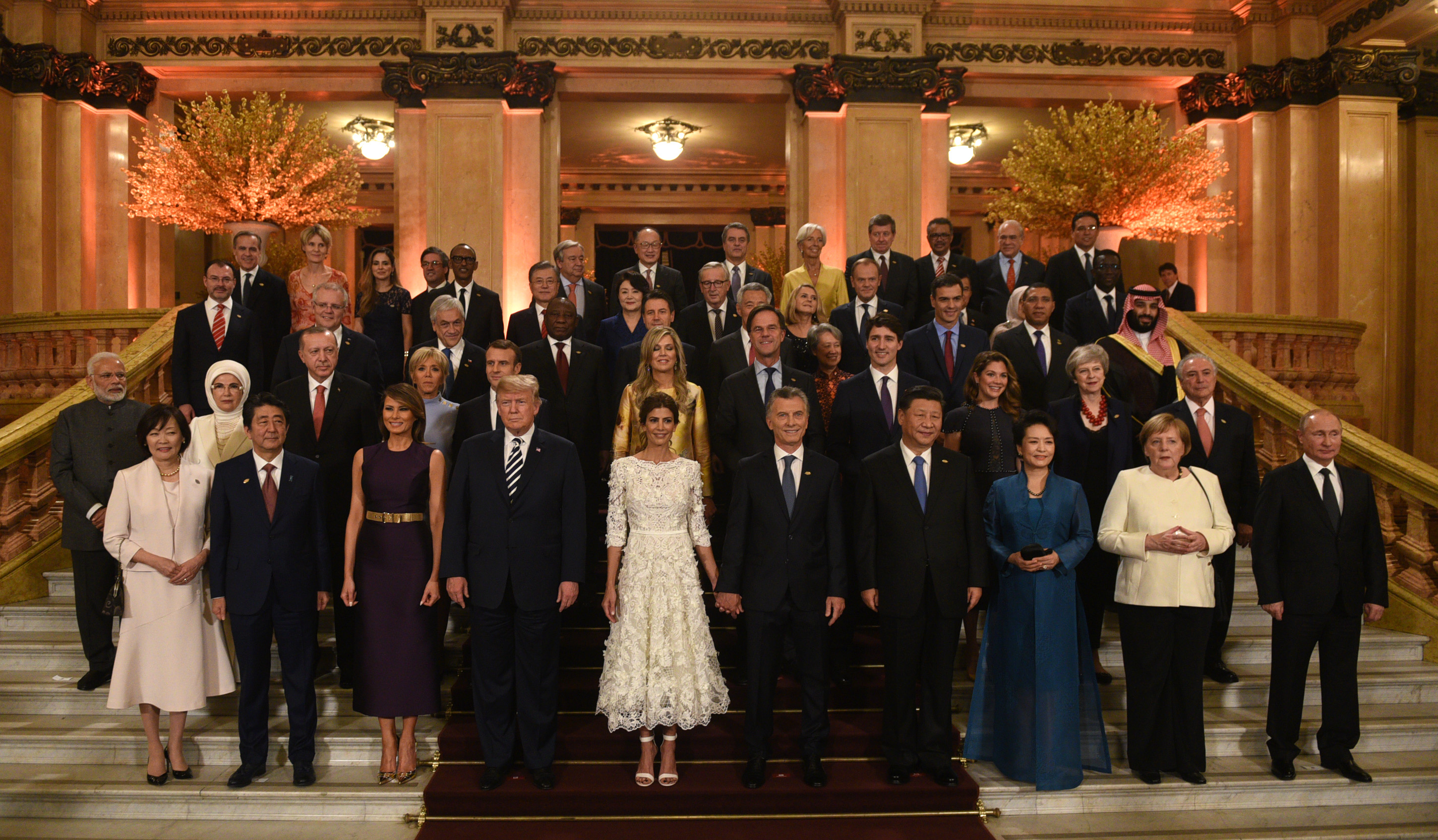
G20 family photo at the Teatro Colón in Buenos Aires

Most of the leaders were accompanied by their spouses.

== Agenda priorities ==
G20 Argentina has put forth three agenda priorities for the G20 dialogue in 2018: the future of work, infrastructure for development and a sustainable food future.

A number of attending countries have said they focus on the regulation of crypto-currencies at this meeting.

Talks between the U.S. and China related to resolving the escalating 2018 China–United States trade war were a central issue of the summit.

== Outcomes ==
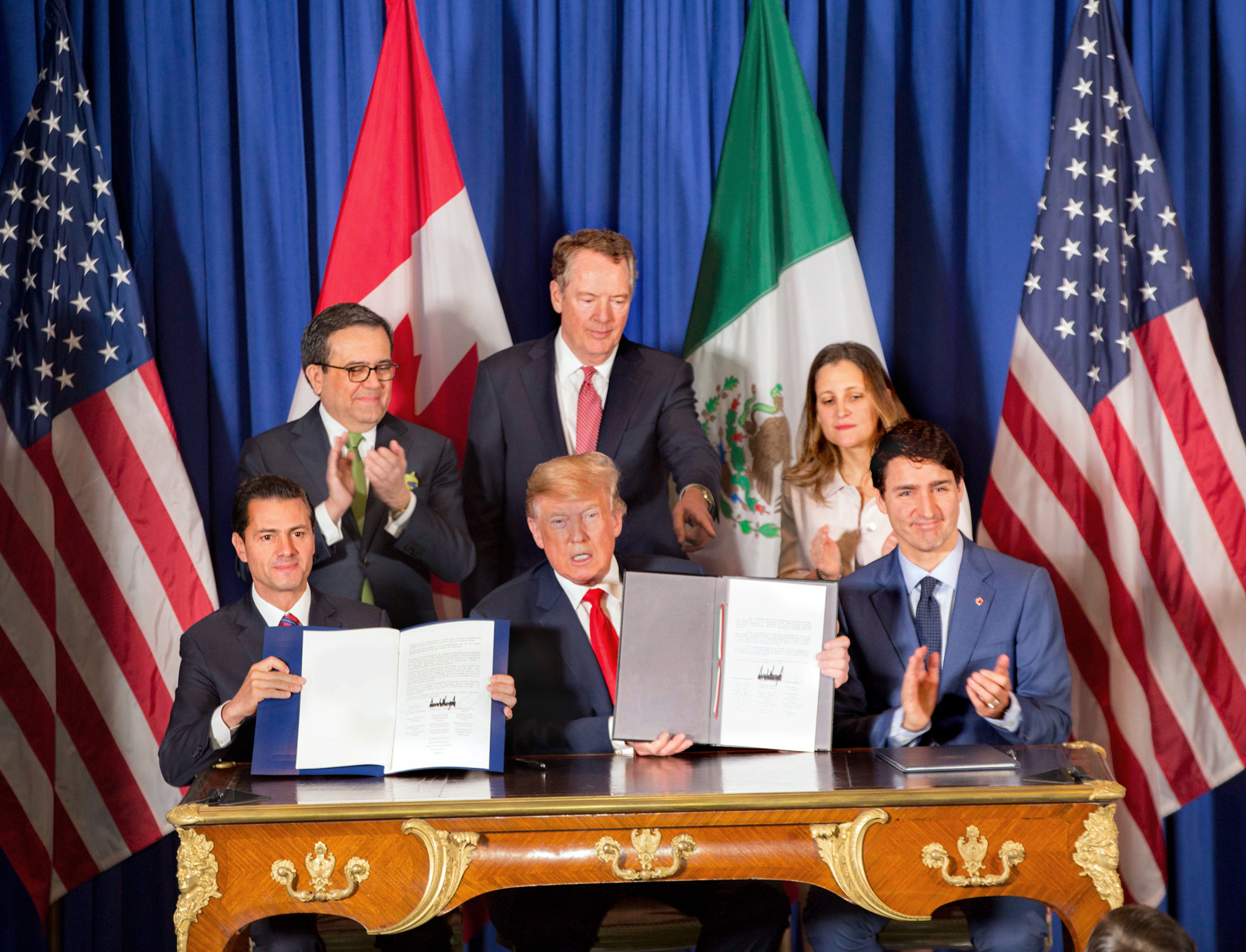
Outgoing Mexican President Enrique Peña Nieto, U.S. President Donald Trump, and Canadian Prime Minister Justin Trudeau signed the USMCA agreement.

On Friday 30 November, ahead of the formal start of the summit, outgoing Mexican President Peña Nieto, U.S. President Donald Trump, and Canadian Prime Minister Justin Trudeau signed the United States–Mexico–Canada Agreement (USMCA), a proposed replacement to the 1994 North American Free Trade Agreement (NAFTA).

== Counter-summit ==
The Council of Social Sciences (CLACSO) had organized a counter-summit, called the First World Forum of Critical Thinking, which took place in the week leading up to the G20 event. It was attended by other politicians such as former Brazilian president Dilma Rousseff, Bolivian vice president Álvaro García Linera, former Colombian president Ernesto Samper, and human rights activist Estela de Carlotto. At the event, former Argentine president Cristina Fernández de Kirchner criticised the economic policies of Mauricio Macri and the IMF loans that he has received. Former Uruguayan president José Mujica was also invited, but declined to take part in the counter-summit to avoid damaging Argentina–Uruguay relations.

== Security ==
The previous summit in Hamburg, Germany, met with huge protests, with cars set on fire and roads blocked by protesters. The 2018 summit had reinforced security, to prevent a repeat of those protests. Local left-wing organizations planned protests and called for foreign activists to join them. The Argentine government, working alongside the others, is attempting to prevent the entry of troublemakers into the country, such as people with criminal charges or who have advocated for violent actions. Only peaceful protests will be allowed. Federal Security Minister Patricia Bullrich said that "We will not permit illegal acts. Those who want to cross the line will have to face the legal consequences". 22,000 police and 700 security ministry agents will guard the event, working alongside the security services of the United States, the United Kingdom, Brazil, Italy, Spain and others. An area of 12 square kilometres (4.6 sq mi) around the Costa Salguero Convention Centre will be cordoned off, the public transportation network – including the metro – will be shut down, and traffic along the River Plate will be halted. Friday, 30 November was declared a one-time public holiday day in the city of Buenos Aires, to prevent the traffic caused by people's daily activities, and residents were urged to leave the city for the long weekend. Media Minister Hernán Lombardi reported that no infiltration by international terrorist groups had been detected, and the US government said that the remote location of Argentina would discourage international protesters from travelling to the country.

Two bomb attacks took place in the days before the summit. Judge Claudio Bonadio, who was investigating former president Cristina Fernández de Kirchner for embezzlement charges, was attacked in his home; his bodyguards stopped Marco Viola, who was arrested, and the bomb was dismantled by a police bomb squad. Anahi Esperanza Salcedo, who identifies as an anarchist and a radical feminist, tried to bomb the tomb of the late chief of police Ramón Lorenzo Falcón at La Recoleta Cemetery, but her bomb went off early and she was hospitalized with injuries to her hand and face. Both attacks were made with improvised explosive devices. After those events, the United Kingdom government lowered its terrorism alert for Buenos Aires from "very likely" to "likely".
