= US public opinion on the North American Free Trade Agreement =

After it went into effect on January 1, 1994, public opinion in the United States on the North American Free Trade Agreement (NAFTA) varied over time. In 2020, NAFTA was superseded by the United States-Mexico-Canada Agreement.

Early public opinion on NAFTA was ambivalent, where a plurality of polled Americans was either unsure about NAFTA or did not have an opinion about NAFTA. As public opinion on NAFTA evolved, there were intermittent shifts in polls and surveys between support and opposition for NAFTA. However, support or opposition to NAFTA was frequently out of a plurality, as there was regularly a significant portion of respondents that were unsure about NAFTA and or did not have a substantial opinion on NAFTA.

Notably, during the 2016 presidential election, President Donald Trump became a briefly polarizing force on public opinion about NAFTA, where negative views of NAFTA not only proliferated among Republican voters, but also the general population.

Towards the end of NAFTA, present public opinion on it was positive, with surveys finding that a majority of Americans viewed it as good for the US economy. However, to note, public opinion towards NAFTA greatly fluctuated when survey data was organized into different categories (e.g. political party, level of education).

Public opinion scholarship on NAFTA included two studies done in the late 1990s. Each examined two different aspects about public opinion on NAFTA.

- In one study, the political scientist Jeffrey E. Cohen observed if NAFTA was a case of how well public opinion was taken into consideration by presidents.
- In another study the political scientist Eric M. Uslaner studied whether or not the case of NAFTA demonstrated that shifts in public opinion are in response to major events.

== Early public opinion and polling (1992–1993) ==
Although the proposed NAFTA was one of the more hotly contested issues during the 1992 presidential election, early polling data from NBC/the Wall Street Journal demonstrated that an overall plurality of Americans either had no opinion or were unsure about the policy.

From the first administration of the NBC-Wall Street Journal poll on September 12, 1992

- 40% were either unsure or did not have an opinion on NAFTA,
- 27% supported NAFTA
- 34% opposed NAFTA

Likewise, this plurality of ambivalence towards NAFTA persisted until the final administration of the poll on November 14, 1993. On the final poll, the plurality of poll respondents were in favor of NAFTA (36%). The known cause of this shift was due to a televised debate on NAFTA that pitted the then Vice President Al Gore against presidential candidate Ross Perot. The debate was held on November 9, 1993 on CNN news segment Larry King Live.

Perot opposed NAFTA, stating that the policy would harm American workers (as the presumption was that American companies would outsource their labor to Mexico as soon as the agreement was put into effect);

Gore supported NAFTA, stating how beneficial the agreement would be for both the US economy and its trade due to lower trade barriers (e.g. tariffs). As indicated by the positive uptick in support for NAFTA on the last administration of the NBC-Wall Street Journal poll, Gore was perceived by the public as the winner of the debate, ultimately augmenting public support towards NAFTA.

== Evolution of public opinion (1999–2015) ==
In scope, the evolution of public opinion on NAFTA from 1999 to 2015 frequently switched between support and opposition to the policy.

- A 1999 study by the Program on International Policy Attitudes showed that a plurality of Americans (44%) thought that NAFTA was good for the US.
- A 2004 Newsweek Poll indicated that a plurality of Americans (35%) thought that NAFTA was bad for the US.
- A 2005 international policy attitudes poll revealed that 46% of respondents saw NAFTA as a policy that was good for the US.
- A 2008 Pew Research Center/Council on Foreign Relations survey saw that 48% of respondents thought that NAFTA was bad for the US. A Rasmussen Report apportions this particular shift in opinion towards rising oil and food prices, along with other economic factors.
- A 2015 NBC-Wall Street Journal poll found that a plurality of respondents (32%) thought that NAFTA did not have much of an impact on the US and its economy.

== Later polling (2016 - 2020) ==
=== 2016 presidential election ===
During the 2016 election campaign, candidate Trump promulgated a view that was critical of free trade agreements like NAFTA, citing that such agreements affected the US economy negatively and that these were only beneficial to other countries. A study done by researchers at the Harvard University T.H. Chan School of Public Health noted how registered Republican voters positively received Trump's view, with 68% of those voters opining that free trade agreements like NAFTA were "a bad thing" for the United States.

A Bloomberg National Poll conducted from February 19 to February 22 of 2016 showed that proportionally

- 29% of respondents thought that NAFTA was good for the US economy
- 44% of respondents thought that NAFTA was bad for the US economy
- 27% of respondents were unsure.

When the same poll was conducted in 2017, the results demonstrated a positive shift in views on NAFTA:

- 41% thought that NAFTA was good for the economy
- 37% thought that NAFTA was bad for the economy
- 22% were unsure.

=== US public opinion ===
According to a 2018 survey conducted by the Pew Research Center, when prompted on whether or not NAFTA was good or bad for the US, 56% of all respondents viewed NAFTA as good for the US. Similar results were found in a survey run by the Chicago Council of Global Affairs, where 53% of respondents thought that NAFTA was good for the US (and its economy in particular).

Categorically, respondents with greater education had more pro-NAFTA views.

- 70% of postgraduates
- 57% of college graduates
- 52% with some college,
- 54% with a high school education or less

However, along ideological (i.e. partisan) lines, conservative respondents were more likely to hold unfavorable views of NAFTA whereas liberal respondents were more likely to hold favorable views of NAFTA. Numerically, a survey done by the Chicago Council on Global Affairs found that 71% of Democrats had a positive view on NAFTA and that 34% of Republicans had a positive view on NAFTA. In the Pew Research Center's survey, 74% of respondents who identified as "liberals" thought that NAFTA was good and that 31% of respondents who identified as "conservatives" had the same view as the liberals.

=== Public opinion scholarship ===
One study by Jeffery E. Cohen investigated whether or not NAFTA was a case of presidential responsiveness to public opinion. The other study by Eric M. Uslaner inquired into whether or not the case of NAFTA was representative of how public opinion may shift in response to major events. Fundamentally, at its core, both studies attempt to validate whether or not—with different methods of examination—public opinion on NAFTA could be validated as a comparable case study. Both studies used data from early polls done by NBC/the Wall Street Journal from 1992 to 1993 to determine if their original hypothesis correlated with the evidence.

However, in the end, both scholars were unable to support their hypotheses as both found different results that were contrary to their original hypotheses. Jeffery E. Cohen suggested that NAFTA is not a case of presidential responsiveness to public opinion as "too many people had no opinion, and the rest (of the polling categories) were almost evenly divided." Likewise, Eric M. Uslaner suggested that "people made up their minds on NAFTA on the basis of arguments about trade, not about their own self-interest."
