= United States–Mexico–Canada Agreement =

Free trade agreement

USMCA
Agreement between the United States of America, the United Mexican States, and Canada
(in official languages)
Canadian English	Canada–United States–Mexico Agreement (CUSMA)
American English	United States-Mexico-Canada Agreement (USMCA)
Spanish	Tratado entre México, Estados Unidos y Canadá (T-MEC)
Canadian French	Accord Canada–États-Unis–Mexique (ACEUM)
- Type: Free trade agreement
- Drafted: September 30, 2018
- Signed: September 30, 2018; December 10, 2019 (revised version)
- Location: Mexico City, Mexico
- Effective: July 1, 2020
- Condition: 3 months after notification of each state that all internal procedures have been completed
- Expiration: Upon the end of a 16-year term (renewable indefinitely)
- Ratifiers: United States; Mexico; Canada
- Languages: English; French; Spanish

The Agreement between the United States of America, the United Mexican States, and Canada (USMCA) (Note: Each signatory has a different name for the agreement—in the United States, it is called the United States–Mexico–Canada Agreement (USMCA); in Canada, it is the Canada–United States–Mexico Agreement (CUSMA) in English and the Accord Canada–États-Unis–Mexique (ACEUM) in French; and in Mexico, it is called Tratado entre México, Estados Unidos y Canadá (T-MEC) in Spanish.) is a free trade agreement among the United States, Mexico, and Canada, in effect from July 1, 2020. It replaced the North American Free Trade Agreement (NAFTA) implemented in 1994. It is sometimes characterized as "NAFTA 2.0", or "New NAFTA", since it largely maintains or updates the provisions of its predecessor. The USMCA encompasses one of the world's largest free trade zones, with a total population of more than 510 million and an economy of US$30.997 trillion in nominal GDP—nearly 30 percent of the global economy, and the largest of any trade bloc in the world.

The formal process to renegotiate NAFTA was initiated by the U.S. on May 18, 2017. Rounds of negotiations persisted until all sides came to a formal agreement on October 1, 2018. The following month, U.S. president Donald Trump proposed USMCA during the G20 Summit, where he, Mexican president Enrique Peña Nieto, and Canadian prime minister Justin Trudeau signed it; a revised version reflecting additional consultations was signed on December 10, 2019. USMCA was ratified by all three countries by March 13, 2020 and came into effect on July 1, 2020.

USMCA is primarily a modernization of NAFTA, namely concerning intellectual property and digital trade. It borrows language from the Comprehensive and Progressive Agreement for Trans-Pacific Partnership (CPTPP), of which Canada and Mexico are signatories. Key changes from its predecessor include increased environmental and working regulations; greater incentives for automobile production in the U.S. (with quotas for Canadian and Mexican automotive production); more access to Canada's dairy market; and an increased duty-free limit for Canadians who buy U.S. goods online. (Note: The full list of differences between USMCA and NAFTA is listed on the website of the United States Trade Representative (USTR): "United States–Mexico–Canada Trade Fact Sheet Modernizing NAFTA into a 21st Century Trade Agreement". ustr.gov. 2020. Archived from the original on November 26, 2020.) The treaty contains a provision for review and adjustment in 2026.

On June 1, 2026, with the mandatory July 1 deadline for the trilateral joint review approaching, Canada formally asked the United States and Mexico to renew the agreement for another 16 years. On July 1, 2026, the United States announced it would not renew the agreement. The signatories will now engage in an annual review, for the next 10 years, until the agreement expires on July 1, 2036 or one gives six months' notice of withdrawal.

== Background and nomenclature ==
The United States–Mexico–Canada Agreement is based substantially on the North American Free Trade Agreement (NAFTA), which came into effect on January 1, 1994. The present agreement was the result of more than a year of negotiations including possible tariffs by the United States against Canada in addition to the possibility of separate bilateral deals instead.

During the 2016 U.S. presidential election, Donald Trump's campaign included the promise to renegotiate NAFTA or cancel it if renegotiations were to fail. Upon election, Trump proceeded to make a number of changes affecting trade relations with other countries—withdrawing from the Paris Agreement, ceasing to be part of negotiations for the Trans-Pacific Partnership, and significantly increasing tariffs with China—reinforcing that he was serious about seeking changes to NAFTA, while drawing wide criticism as well. One journal article noted that much of the debate surrounding the virtues and faults of the USMCA is similar to that surrounding all free trade agreements (FTAs); for instance, the nature of FTAs as public goods, potential infringements of national sovereignty, and the role of business, labor, environmental, and consumer interests in shaping the language of trade deals.

The agreement is referred to differently by each signatory—in the United States, it is called the United States–Mexico–Canada Agreement (USMCA); in Canada, it is officially known as the Canada–United States–Mexico Agreement (CUSMA) in English and the Accord Canada–États-Unis–Mexique (ACEUM) in French; and in Mexico, it is called Tratado entre México, Estados Unidos y Canadá (T-MEC). The agreement is sometimes referred to as "New NAFTA", referring to the previous trilateral agreement it is meant to supersede, the North American Free Trade Agreement (NAFTA).

== Country comparison ==
	United States of America	United Mexican States	Canada
Flag	United States	Mexico	Canada
Population	345,257,335 (as of 2024) †	129,388,467 (as of 2024)	41,465,298 (as of 2024)
Land area (km^{2})	9,156,552 km^{2} ‡	1,964,375 km^{2}	9,984,670 km^{2}
Land area (Sq. Mi)	3,535,363 mi^{2} ‡	750,561 mi^{2}	3,855,102 mi^{2}
Population density	37.5/km^{2}	66.1/km^{2}	3.99/km^{2}
Exclusive economic zone	11,351,000 km^{2}	3,269,386 km^{2}	5,559,077 km^{2}
Capital city	Washington	Mexico City	Ottawa
Currency	United States dollar	Mexican peso	Canadian dollar
GDP Nominal ($, in millions) 2023	$27,067,158 ‡	$1,811,468	$2,117,805
GDP Nominal ($) 2023 Per Capita	$80,412	$13,804	$53,247

† Including Guam, Puerto Rico, and the U.S. Virgin Islands.
‡ Including Puerto Rico.

== Negotiations ==
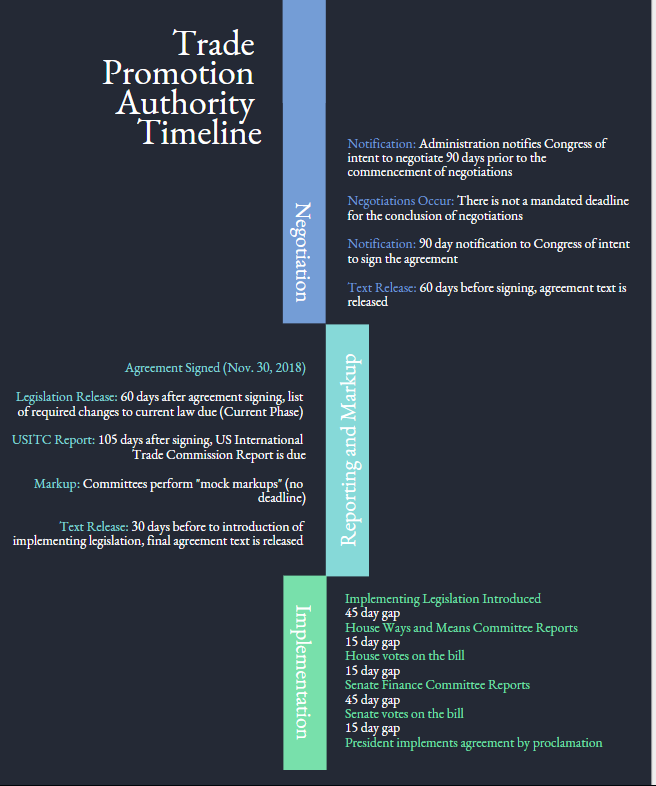
A visualization of the timeline for the USMCA ratification process in the U.S., as prescribed by Trade Promotion Authority

The formal process to renegotiate NAFTA began on May 18, 2017, when U.S. Trade Representative Robert Lighthizer notified Congress of the U.S. intent to initiate talks within 90 days. Under Trade Promotion Authority statutes, the USTR released its key negotiating objectives on July 7, 2017. Negotiations officially commenced on August 16, 2017, with eight formal rounds of talks held until April 8, 2018. By May 2, 2018, no resolution had been reached. Lighthizer warned that talks would pause until 2019 if no deal were finalized by the end of May, citing concerns over Mexico's incoming president, Andrés Manuel López Obrador, who opposed parts of the negotiated terms.

Separately, U.S. House Speaker Paul Ryan set a May 17, 2018, deadline for Congressional action, but this was ignored. A U.S.–Mexico deal was finally reached on August 27, 2018, though Canada still had not agreed. With Mexico's outgoing president, Enrique Peña Nieto, leaving office on December 1, 2018, and a mandatory 60-day review period required, the deadline to finalize the text was September 30. Negotiators worked intensely and completed the draft just before midnight on September 30, 2018. The USMCA text was published as finalized on October 1, 2018, with Lighthizer crediting Jared Kushner for salvaging the deal multiple times.

The agreement was signed by all three countries' leaders on November 30, 2018, during the G20 summit in Buenos Aires. The English, Spanish, and French versions were declared equally authentic. Ratification required the passage of enabling legislation in each country. U.S. Ambassador to Canada Kelly Craft played a critical role in bridging U.S.–Canada differences, boosting her standing within the Trump administration. Behind the scenes, Blackstone CEO Stephen Schwarzman—retained by Trump – reportedly urged Canadian Prime Minister Justin Trudeau to compromise on dairy market protections during a January 2017 meeting with Canada's Liberal Cabinet at a Calgary retreat, where civil servants were absent. Schwarzman claimed Trudeau feared a recession ahead of the 2019 Canadian election.

On December 9, 2019, Fox News reported a breakthrough: negotiators agreed to enforce a $16/hour minimum wage for Mexican auto workers via a neutral third party. Mexico, which imports all its aluminum, opposed U.S. steel/aluminum content rules for vehicles but conceded to finalize ratification by year's end.

== Provisions ==
Provisions of the agreement cover a wide range, including agricultural produce, homelessness, manufactured products, labor conditions, and digital trade, among others. Some of the more prominent aspects of the agreement include giving U.S. dairy farmers greater access to the Canadian market, guidelines to have a higher proportion of automobiles manufactured among the three nations rather than imported from elsewhere, and retention of the dispute resolution system similar to that included in NAFTA.

=== Dairy ===
The dairy provisions give the U.S. tariff-free access to 3.6%, up from 3.25% under the never-ratified Trans-Pacific Partnership, of the $15.2 billion (as of 2016) Canadian dairy market. Canada agreed to eliminate Class 7 pricing provisions on certain dairy products, while Canada's domestic supply management system remains in place.

=== Automobiles ===
Automobile rules of origin (ROO) requirements mandate that a certain portion of an automobile's value must come from within the governed region. In NAFTA, the required portion was 62.5 percent. The USMCA increases this requirement to 75 percent of the automobile's value. The initial proposal from the Trump administration was to increase this to 85 percent and add a stipulation that 50 percent of the automotive content be made by U.S. carmakers, but in the end, the deal's text did not include this version of the provision. There is concern that the increased domestic sourcing requirements, aimed at promoting U.S. employment, will cause higher input costs and disruptions to supply chains deriving outside of certain developing or once more industrious zones, for example the "Rust" Belt.

=== De minimis ===
To facilitate cross-border trade, Mexico and Canada agreed to raise their de minimis exemption thresholds for the application of taxes and customs duties. (In 2016, the United States raised its de minimis threshold for all countries to US$800 (from US$200) per person per day to save on enforcement costs.) For goods transported to Canada by courier from the United States or Mexico, Canada increased the threshold from C$20 (approximately US$16) to C$40 for taxes (GST, HST, PST), and to C$150 for customs duties (tariffs). Some goods do not have an exemption, such as alcohol and tobacco. Mexico maintained its de minimis threshold at US$50 for taxes, and it agreed to provide duty-free shipments up to the equivalent of US$117.

=== Labor ===
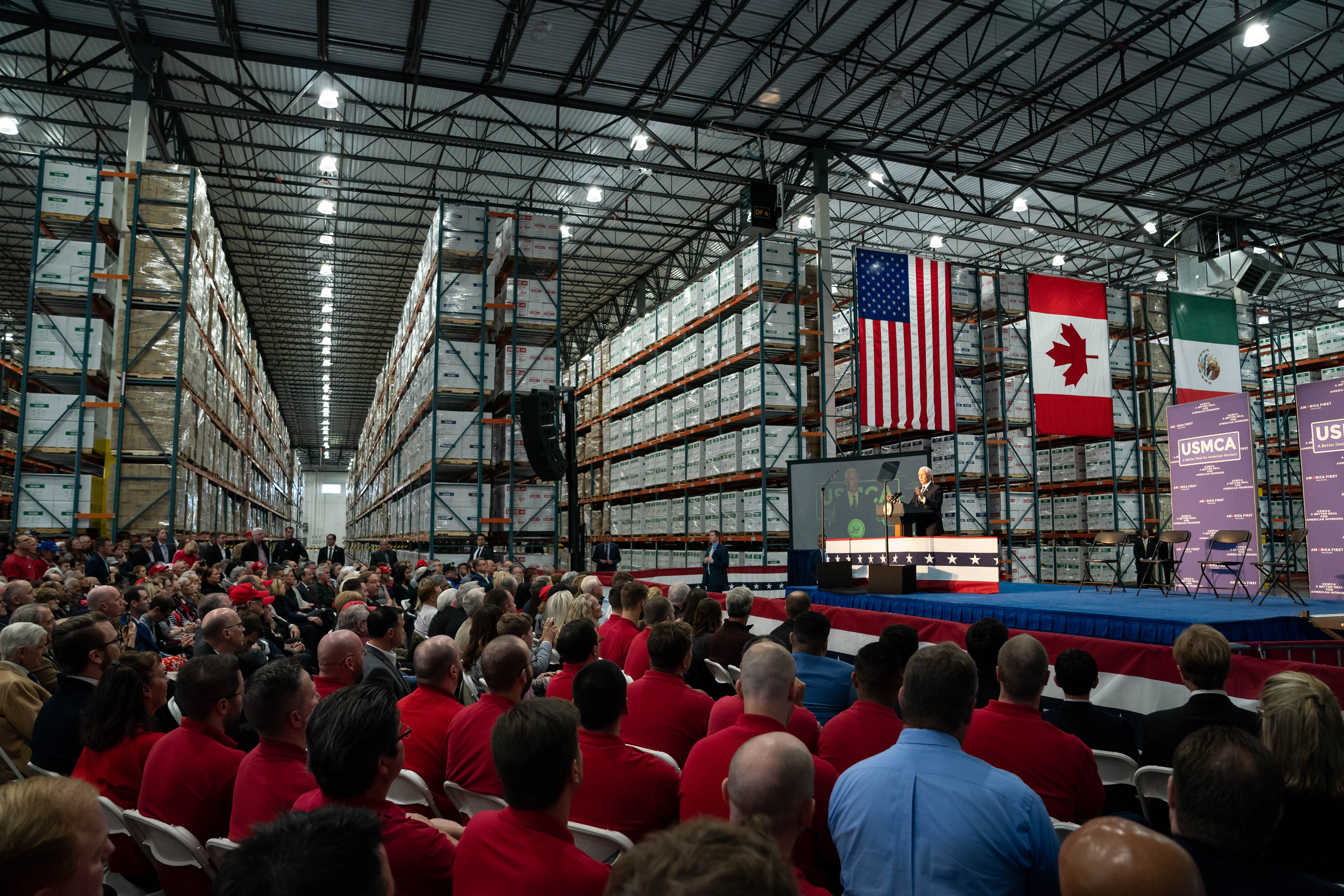
U.S. vice president Mike Pence speaks about the USMCA at a Uline distribution center in Pleasant Prairie, Wisconsin, in October 2019.

USMCA Annex 23-A requires Mexico to pass legislation that improves the collective bargaining capabilities of labor unions. The specific standards Mexico is required to comply with are detailed in the International Labour Organization's Convention 98 on freedom of association and collective bargaining. The administration of Mexico's president, Andrés Manuel López Obrador, introduced legislation in late 2018 that pursues compliance with these international standards.

Other labor-related measures include a minimum wage requirement in the automotive industry. Specifically, 40 to 45 percent of the automobiles manufactured in North America must be made in a factory that pays a minimum of US$16 per hour. This measure will be phased in during the first five years after USMCA ratification.

=== Intellectual property ===
The USMCA extends the copyright length in Canada to life plus 70 years, and 75 years for sound recordings. Furthermore, biotechnological firms would have at least 10 years exclusivity period for agricultural chemicals (double the current 5), and industrial designs' period would "jump" from current 10 to 15 years. Compared to NAFTA, USMCA would require criminal penalties and civil remedies to be available for both satellite and cable theft, reaffirm the Doha Declaration on the TRIPS agreement and public health, contain the strongest due process and transparency requirements for geographic indicator protection systems in any FTA, require criminal procedures and penalties for recording copyrighted movies in movie theaters, and require ex officio authority for customs officials to stop suspected counterfeit goods.

==== Pharmaceuticals ====
USMCA provides for a patent term extension where there is an "unreasonable curtailment" of a pharmaceutical's patent term stemming from delays in the regulatory or marketing approval process.

USMCA accounts for the data exclusivity of new pharmaceutical products. New pharmaceutical products are those that do not contain a chemical entity that has been previously approved by that party. Generic manufacturers are prohibited from relying on the innovator's previously undisclosed safety/efficacy testing for at least five years from the date marketing approval was first granted. Mexico agreed to extend its data protection of new pharmaceutical products. Canada's data protection regime already offered an eight-year exclusivity period for innovative drugs and thus was not required to make changes.

Initially, the parties contemplated creating an exclusivity period for new products containing biologics for at least ten years from the approval date. Biologics are defined as a product that is "produced using biotechnology processes and that is, or contains, a virus, therapeutic serum, toxin, antitoxin, vaccine, blood, blood component or derivative, allergenic product, protein, or analogous product, for use in human beings for the prevention, treatment, or cure of a disease or condition". This period would have been longer than the exclusivity periods of both Canada and Mexico, but shorter than that of the United States. This provision was heavily criticized for its potential to limit access to biological medications and make them unaffordable. Thus, biologics were covered in the definition of "new pharmaceutical products" and are instead eligible for a minimum five-year protection period.

=== Elimination of foreign office and local presence requirements ===
The USMCA would eliminate the need for companies to establish headquarters in any other USMCA country. It will encourage cross-border business by excluding U.S. companies from the need to localize data and open a Canadian or Mexican HQ. For example, McDonald's Canada or Apple Canada could both cease to exist, and the surviving entities would be a North American McDonald's or Apple.

=== Dispute settlement mechanisms ===
There are three primary dispute settlement mechanisms contained in NAFTA. Chapter 20 is the country-to-country resolution mechanism. It is often regarded as the least contentious of the three mechanisms, and it was sustained in its original NAFTA form in USMCA. Such cases would involve complaints between USMCA member states that a term of the agreement had been violated. Chapter 19 disputes manage the justifications of anti-dumping or countervailing duties. Without Chapter 19, the legal recourse for managing these policies would be through the domestic legal system. Chapter 19 specifies that a USMCA Panel will hear the case and act as an International Trade Court in arbitrating the dispute. The Trump administration attempted to remove Chapter 19 from the new USMCA text, though it has thus far endured in the agreement.

Chapter 11 is the third mechanism, known as investor-state dispute settlement, wherein multinational corporations are enabled to sue participating governments over allegedly discriminatory policies. Chapter 11 is broadly considered the most controversial of the settlement mechanisms. The Canadian negotiators effectively removed themselves from Chapter 11 in the USMCA version of this measure, Chapter 14. Canada will have a full exemption from ISDS three years after NAFTA has been terminated.

=== Beyond the Border accord ===
In addition to building on the existing NAFTA fused with elements from the Trans-Pacific Partnership, the USMCA also incorporates elements from the "Beyond the Border" accord signed by former Prime Minister Stephen Harper and former president Barack Obama, most notably the "single window" initiative and folding the "Regulatory Cooperation Council" into the "Good Regulatory Governance" chapter 28 of the new accord.

=== Sunset clause ===
Additionally, there is a stipulation that the agreement itself must be reviewed by the three nations every six years, with a 16-year sunset clause. The agreement can be extended for an additional 16-year term during the six-year reviews. At the first six-year review, in the summer of 2026, the US formally declined to extend, and the agreement will now require annual reviews, until its expiration in 2036, or one of the signatories withdraws, after giving six months' notice. The introduction of the sunset clause places more control in shaping the future of the USMCA in the hands of domestic governments. However, there is concern that this can create greater uncertainty. Sectors such as automotive manufacturing require significant investment in cross-border supply chains. Given the dominance of the United States consumer market, this will likely pressure firms to locate more production in the U.S., with a greater likelihood of increased production costs for those vehicles. Local production has always been tied to increased demand for local skill-based acquisition which is another form of human-rights particularly with laterally transferable skills and specific categories of educational attainment. Local skill demand and supply serve to enfranchise working populations in their abilities to sustain locally interdependent markets, adding to the ability of skilled individuals to respond to stressors while generally altering other areas of demand/supply in the market materially and in a community. Wider phenomena that are associated with skill-based labor enfranchisement include benefits socioeconomically to that of domestic relationships and children, public safety and crime reported or not, and resilience, and hopefully, within any extant skill-deprived regions.

=== Currency ===
A new addition to the USMCA is the inclusion of Chapter 3,3, which covers Macroeconomic Policies and Exchange Rate Matters. This is considered significant because it could set a precedent for future trade agreements. Chapter 33 establishes requirements for currency and macroeconomic transparency which, if violated, would constitute grounds for a Chapter 20 dispute appeal. The U.S., Canada, and Mexico are all currently in compliance with these transparency requirements in addition to the substantive policy requirements which align with the International Monetary Fund Articles of Agreement.

=== Article 32.10 ===
The USMCA will affect how member countries negotiate future free trade deals. Article 32.10 requires USMCA countries to notify USMCA members three months in advance if they intend to begin free trade negotiations with non-market economies. Article 32.10 permits USMCA countries the ability to review any new free trade deals members agree to go forward with. Article 32.10 is widely speculated to be targeting China in intent. In fact, a senior White House official said in connection to the NAFTA deal that "We have been very concerned about the efforts of China to essentially undermine the U.S. position by entering into arrangements with others."

=== Against exchange rate manipulation ===
The USMCA countries are to abide by IMF standards aimed at preventing the manipulation of exchange rates. The agreement calls for public disclosure of market interventions. The IMF can be summoned to act as a referee if the parties dispute.

=== Against state-owned enterprises ===
State-owned enterprises, which are favored by China as levers for exercising its dominance, are prevented from receiving unfair subsidies when compared to private enterprises.

=== Against import and export restrictions ===
None of the parties is permitted to implement restrictions/prohibitions of imports and exports other than those specified in the General Agreement on Tariffs and Trade (GATT 1994) or specified within USMCA. GATT 1994 specifies cases such as shortages, failure to meet local regulatory or licencing standards, and certain Animal Agricultural considerations. This condition does not apply to any party outside of the three USMCA parties.

A party can call the parties to review a restriction or prohibition imposed by another party on a non-party if the restriction or prohibition causes pricing or other types of distortions for any of the parties.

=== Canadian exemptions from USMCA import and export restrictions ===
- Logs
- Unprocessed fish
- Goods produced by forced or slave labour
- Firearms deemed illegal by the Canadian Government
- Literature and other material that constitute terrorist propaganda, depict violence or crime, child pornography, and other material not legal in Canada
- Commercial marine activity in Canadian waters
- Volumes of ethyl alcohol

=== Mexican exemptions from USMCA import and export restrictions ===
- Certain hydrocarbon and petroleum-based products
- Used vehicles and used vehicle components
- Used clothing

=== United States exemptions from USMCA import and export restrictions ===
- Logs

== Ratification and legal status ==
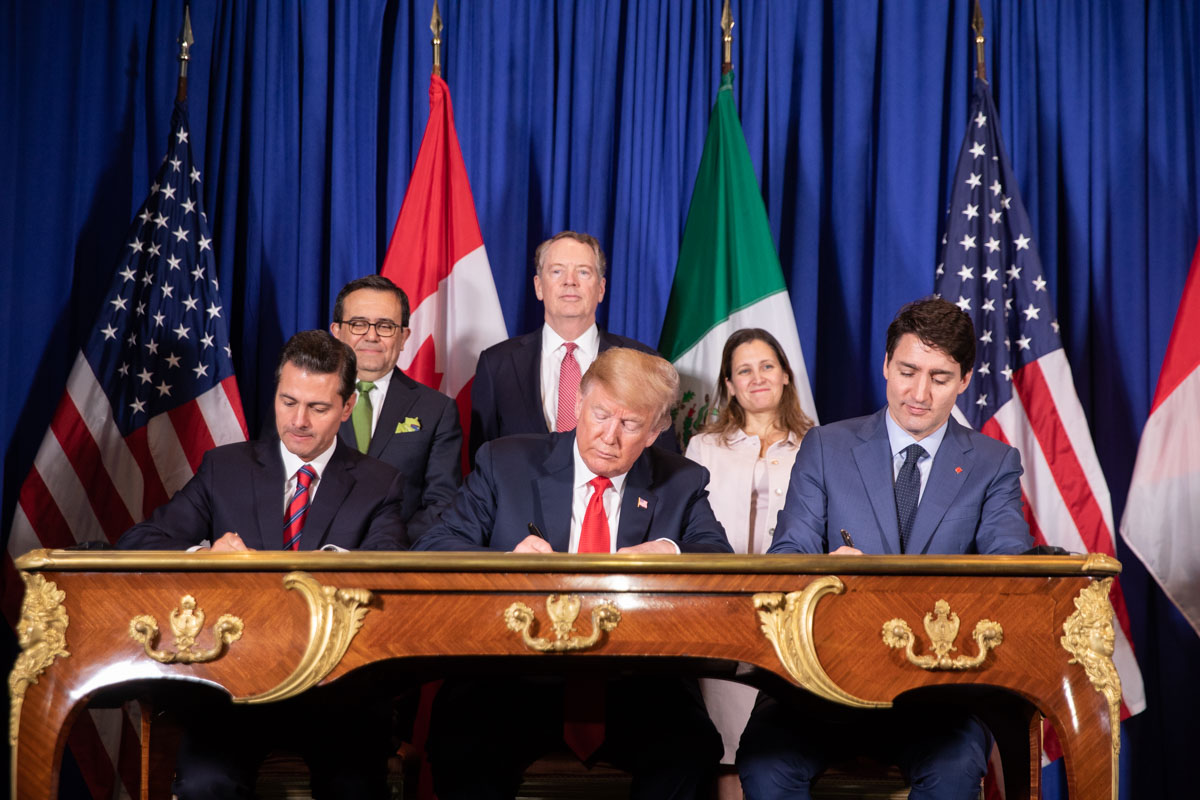
Outgoing Mexican president Enrique Peña Nieto, U.S. president Donald Trump, and Canadian prime minister Justin Trudeau sign the agreement during the G20 summit in Buenos Aires, Argentina, on November 30, 2018.

The USMCA was signed on November 30, 2018, by all three parties at the G20 summit in Buenos Aires, as had been planned in the preceding months. However, continued disputes over labor rights, steel, and aluminium prevented ratification of this version of the agreement. Consequently, Canadian Deputy Prime Minister Chrystia Freeland, U.S. Trade Representative Robert Lightizer and Mexican Undersecretary for North America Jesus Seade formally signed a revised agreement on December 10, 2019, which was ratified by all three countries by March 13, 2020.

=== United States ===
United States-Mexico-Canada Agreement Implementation Act
- Long title: To implement the Agreement between the United States of America, the United Mexican States, and Canada attached as an Annex to the Protocol Replacing the North American Free Trade Agreement.
- Acronyms (colloquial): USMCA
- Enacted by: the 116th United States Congress

Citations
- Public law: Pub. L. 116–113 (text) (PDF)

Legislative history
- Introduced in the House as H.R. 5430 by Steny Hoyer (D-MD) on December 13, 2019; Committee consideration by House Ways and Means, House Education and Labor, House Natural Resources, House Foreign Affairs, House Judiciary, House Budget, House Transportation, House Financial Services, House Agriculture, House Energy and Commerce, and House Oversight and Reform; Passed the House on December 19, 2019 (385-41); Passed the Senate on January 16, 2020 (89–10); Signed into law by President Donald Trump on January 29, 2020

Domestic procedures for ratification of the agreement are governed by the Trade promotion authority legislation, otherwise known as "fast track" authority.

Growing objections within the member states about U.S. trade policy and various aspects of the USMCA affected the signing and ratification process. Mexico stated it would not sign the USMCA if steel and aluminium tariffs remained. There was speculation after the results of the November 6, 2018 U.S. midterm elections that the Democrats' increased power in the House of Representatives might interfere with the passage of the USMCA agreement. Senior Democrat Bill Pascrell argued for changes to the USMCA to enable it to pass Congress. Republicans opposed USMCA provisions requiring labor rights for LGBTQ and pregnant workers. Forty Congressional Republicans urged Trump against signing a deal that contained "the unprecedented inclusion of sexual orientation and gender identity language"; as a result, Trump ultimately signed a revised version that committed each nation only to "policies that it considers appropriate to protect workers against employment discrimination" and clarified that the United States would not be required to introduce any additional nondiscrimination laws. The Canadian government expressed concern about the changes evolving within the USMCA agreement.

On December 2, 2018, Trump announced he would begin the six-month process to withdraw from NAFTA, adding that Congress needed either to ratify the USMCA or else revert to pre-NAFTA trading rules. Academics had debated whether the president can unilaterally withdraw from the pact without Congressional approval.

On March 1, 2019, organizations representing the U.S. agricultural sector announced their support for the USMCA and urged Congress to ratify the agreement. They also urged the Trump administration to continue upholding NAFTA until the new trade agreement is ratified. However, on March 4, House Ways and Means chairman Richard Neal predicted a "very hard" path through Congress for the deal. Starting March 7, senior White House officials met with House Ways and Means members, as well as moderate caucuses from both parties, such as the Problem Solvers Caucus, the Tuesday Group, and the Blue Dog Coalition in their efforts to gain support for ratification. The Trump administration has also backed down from the threat of withdrawing from NAFTA as the negotiations with Congress continued.

On May 30, 2019, USTR Lighthizer submitted to Congress a draft statement on administrative measures concerning the implementation of the U.S.–Mexico–Canada Agreement (USMCA and the new NAFTA under the Presidential Trade Promotion Authority (TPA) Act of 2015 (Statement of Administrative Action). The draft would allow USMCA implementation legislation to be submitted to Congress after 30 days, thus on or after June 29. In a letter sent to Nancy Pelosi, Speaker of the House of Representatives, and Kevin McCarthy, House Minority Leader, Lighthizer said that the USMCA is the gold standard in U.S. trade policy, modernizing U.S. competitive digital trade, intellectual property, and services provisions and creating a level playing field for U.S. companies, workers and farmers, an agreement that represents a fundamental rebalancing of trade relations between Mexico and Canada. With the draft statement on administrative measures submitted, Speaker Pelosi stated that U.S. Trade Representative Lighthizer should confirm that the draft wording of the USMCA would benefit U.S. workers and farmers and that, although she agreed on the need to revise NAFTA, stricter enforcement of labor and environmental protection standards was needed.

President Donald Trump warned on September 25, 2019, that an impeachment inquiry against him could derail congressional approval of USMCA, dragging down Mexico's peso and stock market as investors fled riskier assets. The U.S. House of Representatives was proceeding with work on USMCA, U.S. House Speaker Nancy Pelosi said on September 26, 2019. Bloomberg News reported on October 29, 2019, that the Trump administration planned to include in the legislation approving the pact a provision that would allow the USTR to directly control how and where cars and parts are made by global automakers. On December 19, 2019, the United States House of Representatives passed the USMCA with bipartisan support by a vote of 385 (Democratic 193, Republican 192) to 41 (Democratic 38, Republican 2, Independent 1). On January 16, 2020, the United States Senate passed the trade agreement by a vote of 89 (Democratic 38, Republican 51) to 10 (Democratic 8, Republican 1, Independent 1) and the bill was forwarded to the White House for Trump's signature. On January 29, 2020, Trump signed the agreement into law (Public Law No: 116–113). It officially amended NAFTA but not the 1989 Canada–United States Free Trade Agreement which is only "suspended", so in case parties fail to extend or renew it in six years, FTA would become the law.

On April 24, 2020, Lighthizer gave official notice to Congress that the new trade deal was set to come into force on July 1, 2020, and notified Canada and Mexico to that effect. On June 1, 2020, the USTR released the "Uniform Regulations", which help interpret the different chapters of the USMCA, primarily chapters 4–7, paving the way for the Agreement to take effect domestically; NAFTA was consequently replaced the following month, on July 1, 2020.

=== Mexico ===
Treaty between Mexico, the United States, and Canada

Congress of the Union
- Long title: Modifying Protocol to the Agreement between the United Mexican States, the United States of America, and Canada, an instrument that modifies the Protocol that replaces the North American Free Trade Agreement with the Agreement between the United Mexican States, the United States of America, and Canada.
- Passed by: Senate of the Republic
- Passed: 12 December 2019 (107-1)

Legislative history
- Introduced by: Federal Executive Power
- Introduced: 10 December 2019
- Status: In force

On November 27, 2018, the government of Mexico said it would give to Jared Kushner its highest civilian honor, the Order of the Aztec Eagle, for his work in negotiating the USMCA.

On June 19, 2019, the Senate of Mexico passed the treaty's ratification bill on first reading in a 114–4 vote, with three abstentions. The treaty was passed on its second and final reading by the Senate on December 12, 2019, by a vote of 107–1.

Manufacturing in Mexico, as of 2018, accounts for 17% of its GDP. However, Andrés Manuel López Obrador, then president of Mexico, believed that this trade deal would be a net positive for the Mexican economy by growing foreign investments, creating jobs, and expanding trade.

On April 3, 2020, Mexico announced it was ready to implement the agreement, joining Canada, though it requested that its automotive industry be given extra time to comply.

=== Canada ===
Canada–United States–Mexico Agreement Implementation Act

Parliament of Canada
- Long title: An Act to implement the Agreement between Canada, the United States of America, and the United Mexican States
- Passed by: House of Commons
- Passed: 13 March 2020
- Passed by: Senate
- Passed: 13 March 2020
- Royal assent: 13 March 2020

Legislative history

Initiating chamber: House of Commons
- Bill title: C-4
- Introduced by: Chrystia Freeland, Minister of Intergovernmental Affairs
- Status: In force

On May 29, 2019, prime minister Justin Trudeau introduced a CUSMA implementation bill in the House of Commons. On June 20, it passed second reading in the House of Commons and was referred to the Standing Committee on International Trade.

Governor General of Canada Julie Payette declared the dissolution of the 42nd Canadian Parliament on September 11, 2019, and formally issued the writs of election for the 2019 Canadian federal election. All pending legislation is scrapped upon any dissolution of Parliament, meaning that the CUSMA implementation bill needed to be re-introduced in the 43rd Canadian Parliament which began on December 5, 2019.

On December 10, 2019, a revised CUSMA agreement was reached by the three countries. On January 29, 2020, Deputy Prime Minister and Minister of Intergovernmental Affairs Chrystia Freeland introduced CUSMA implementation bill C-4 in the House of Commons and it passed its first reading without a recorded vote. On February 6, the bill passed second reading in the House of Commons on a vote of 275 to 28, with the Bloc Québécois voting against and all other parties voting in favor, and it was referred to the Standing Committee on International Trade. On February 27, 2020, the committee voted to send the bill to the full House for third reading, without amendments.

On March 13, 2020, the House of Commons passed Bill C-4 to implement CUSMA before suspending itself for six weeks due to the COVID-19 pandemic. Due to the "extraordinary circumstances", the third and final reading of the bill was deemed to be approved without a recorded vote, as part of an omnibus adjournment motion unanimously approved by all members present. Prime Minister Justin Trudeau was not present, since he was in self-isolation at home after his wife Sophie Grégoire Trudeau tested positive for COVID-19 infection. On the same day, the Senate passed first, second, and third readings of the bill without recorded votes, and Governor General Julie Payette granted royal assent and it became law, thus completing Canada's ratification of the legislation.

On April 3, 2020, Canada notified the United States and Mexico that it had completed its domestic ratification process of the agreement.

== Effects and analysis ==
=== Similarities to NAFTA ===
During his 2016 election campaign and presidency, Trump was highly critical of NAFTA (oftentimes describing it as "perhaps the worst trade deal ever made") while extolling USMCA as "a terrific deal for all of us". The USMCA is very similar to NAFTA, carrying over many of the same provisions and making only modest, mostly cosmetic changes, and is expected to have only a minor economic effect. Former U.S. trade representative Mickey Kantor, who oversaw the signing of NAFTA during the Bill Clinton administration, said, "It's the original NAFTA."

=== Response ===
Representatives from the American Federation of Labor and Congress of Industrial Organizations (AFL–CIO) have criticized the labor standards in the USMCA as unenforceable and toothless. Senator Elizabeth Warren of Massachusetts said "the new rules will make it harder to bring down drug prices for seniors and anyone else who needs access to life-saving medicine", reflecting on the measure that expands the patent length for biological substances to 10 years, limiting access for new generic drugs to enter the market.

In a 2018 fact sheet, the Trump administration's Office of the U.S. Trade Representative cited new digital trade measures, the strengthening of protection for trade secrets, and the automobile rules-of-origin adjustments as some of the benefits of the proposed trade agreement. In 2018 Jim Balsillie, former chair of once-dominant handheld telephone firm Research in Motion, wrote that the "colonial supplicant attitude" of Canadian politicians was a wrong-headed approach to the data and IP provisions of the USMCA. A report published in the summer of 2018 was that the National Research Council of Canada feared that domestic firms run the risk of becoming "data cows" of foreign big data under the provisions of the USMCA.

On January 30, 2020, Trump said: "The USMCA is the fairest, most balanced, and beneficial trade agreement we have ever signed into law. It's the best agreement we've ever made".

By contrast, on February 24, 2025, during Trump's second term, he said that Mexico and Canada "made these great deals with the United States, took advantage of the United States on manufacturing ... I look at some of these agreements, I'd read them at night, and I'd say, 'Who would ever sign a thing like this?'"

=== Economic effects ===
USMCA is projected to have a very small effect on the economy. An International Monetary Fund (IMF) working paper issued in late March 2019 found that the agreement would have "negligible" effects on the broad economy. The IMF study projected that the USMCA "would adversely affect trade in the automotive, textiles and apparel sectors, while generating modest aggregate gains in terms of welfare, mostly driven by improved goods market access, with a negligible effect on real GDP." The IMF study noted that the USMCA's economic benefits would be greatly enhanced if there were a repeal of the tariffs enacted by President Trump (i.e., if the U.S. eliminated tariffs on steel and aluminium imports from Canada and Mexico, and Canada and Mexico dropped retaliatory tariffs on imports from the U.S.).

An April 2019 International Trade Commission analysis on the likely effect of the USMCA estimated that the agreement, when fully implemented (six years following ratification), would increase U.S. real GDP by 0.35% and would increase U.S. total employment by 0.12% (176,000 jobs). The analysis cited by another study from the Congressional Research Service found the agreement would not have a measurable effect on jobs, wages, or overall economic growth. In the summer of 2019, Trump's top economic advisor Larry Kudlow (the director of the National Economic Council in the Trump White House) made unsupported claims regarding the likely economic benefits of the agreement, overstating projections related to jobs and GDP growth.

In December 2019, Thea M. Lee and Robert E. Scott of the Economic Policy Institute criticized USMCA as "weak tea, at best" because it would have "virtually no measurable impacts on wages or incomes for U.S. workers," noting that "The benefits are tiny, and it's highly uncertain whether the deal will be a net winner or loser, in the end."

In June 2020, the Nikkei Asian Review reported that Japanese auto companies are opting to "triple Mexican pay rather than move to the US" to avoid tariffs on automotive parts.

== See also ==
- North American integration
- Comprehensive and Progressive Agreement for Trans-Pacific Partnership (CPTPP)
- North American Free Trade Agreement (NAFTA)
- North American Leaders' Summit (NALS)
- Trans-Pacific Partnership (TPP)
- U.S. public opinion on the North American Free Trade Agreement
- China–United States trade war
