= List of places named after people =

There are a number of places named after famous people. For more on the general etymology of place names see toponymy. For other lists of eponyms (names derived from people) see eponym.

== Countries ==
- Azerbaijan – Atropates
- Bharat – original name for India, derived from either Dushyanta's son Bharata or Rishabha's son Bharata
- Bolivia – Simón Bolívar
- Cambodia – Kambu Svayambhuva
- Colombia – Christopher Columbus (after the Italian version of his name, Cristoforo Colombo)
- Cook Islands – Captain James Cook
- Dominican Republic – Saint Dominic
- El Salvador – "The Saviour", referring to Jesus
- Eswatini – Mswati II
- Israel – Jacob (alternative name)
- Italy – Italus
- Kiribati – Thomas Gilbert
- Liechtenstein – Anton Florian of Liechtenstein
- Marshall Islands – John Marshall
- Mauritius – Maurice of Nassau
- Mozambique – Mussa Bin Bique
- Philippines – Philip II of Spain
- Saint Kitts and Nevis – Saint Christopher
- Saint Lucia – Lucy of Syracuse (?)
- Saint Vincent and the Grenadines – Saint Vincent
- San Marino – Saint Marinus
- São Tomé and Príncipe – Saint Thomas and Afonso, Hereditary Prince of Portugal
- Saudi Arabia – Muhammad bin Saud
- Seychelles – Jean Moreau de Sechelles
- Solomon Islands – Solomon
- United States of America - Amerigo Vespucci, or potentially Richard Amerike
- Uzbekistan – Öz Beg Khan of Golden Horde

=== Former countries ===
- Principality of Antioch, now part of Turkey – Antiochus, father of Seleucus I Nicator
- Lotharingia (Lorraine), now part of Belgium, France, Germany, Luxembourg, and the Netherlands – Lothair I
- Northern Rhodesia, now Zambia – Cecil Rhodes
- Southern Rhodesia, now Zimbabwe – Cecil Rhodes
- Terra Mariana ("Land of Mary"), now Estonia and Latvia – Mary, mother of Jesus

=== Lands of Antarctica ===
- Adélie Land – Adèle Dumont d'Urville
- Edward VII Land – King Edward VII
- Queen Maud Land – Queen Maud of Norway
- Ross Dependency – James Clark Ross
- Victoria Land – Queen Victoria

== Settlements ==
- Caesarea (disambiguation) (various cities in various countries) – Julius Caesar or Roman emperors

=== Afghanistan ===
- Ahmad Abad, Afghanistan – Ahmad Shah Massoud
- Ahmad Shah Baba Mina – Ahmad Shah Durrani
- Ai-Khanoum, formerly named Alexandria on the Oxus – Alexander the Great
- Ayub Khan Mena (Kabul) – Ayub Khan (Emir of Afghanistan)
- Mir Bacha Kot District – Mir Bacha Khan (1825–1905)
- Ghaziabad, Kunar – Amir Muhammad Ghazi Khan Shaheed (died in 1980s)
- Ghazi Amanullah Khan Town – Amanullah Khan
- Jalalabad – Jalal-ud-Din Muhammad Akbar
- Jamal Mena, Kabul – Jamāl al-Dīn al-Afghānī
- Kandahar – Alexander the Great
- Khwaja Bahauddin District- Khwaja Bahauddin, Naqshband of Turkistan
- Khushal Khan Mena – Khushal Khattak
- Mohammad Agha District – Agha Mohammad Khan Qajar, a founder of the Qajar dynasty
- Nadir Shah Kot District – Mohammed Nadir Shah
- Shah Wali Kot District – Sardar Shah Wali Khan
- Sheberghan – Shapur II
- Sher Khan Bandar – Sher Khan Nashir (1888–1946)
- Wazir Akbar Khan, Kabul and Wazirabad, Kabul – Wazir Akbar Khan

=== Albania ===
- Ali Demi (neighborhood) – Ali Demi
- Asim Zeneli (Albania) – Asim Zeneli, Albanian hero
- Bajram Curri (town) – Albanian activist of Independence Bajram Curri
- Blloku Vasil Shanto – Vasil Shanto, Albanian hero
- Don Bosco (Tirana) – John Bosco
- Kastriot, Albania – George Kastrioti Skanderbeg
- Mihal Grameno (neighborhood) – Mihal Grameno
- Skënderbegas – George Kastrioti Skanderbeg
- Zogu I Zi (Tirana) – Zog I of Albania

=== Algeria ===
- Abdelkader Azil – Abdelkader Azil (1927–1959), Algerian activist
- Abou El Hassen – Abu al-Hassan (1934–1962), Algerian independence hero
- Ahmed Rachedi, Mila – Ahmed Rachedi (1930–1957), Algerian revolutionary martyr
- Assi Youcef – Bouiri Boualem (Youcef) (1927–1960), Algerian military
- Bekkouche Lakhdar – Bekkouche Lakhdar (d.1958), Algerian martyr
- Belouizdad, Algiers – Algerian militant and nationalist Mohamed Belouizdad
- Benabdelmalek Ramdane – Abdelmalek Ramdane (d.1954), first martyr of the revolution
- Bennasser Benchohra – Al-Nasser Bin Fameh (1804–1884)
- Bordj Badji Mokhtar – Badji Mokhtar (1919–1954), Algerian revolutionary
- Bordj Emir Khaled – Khalid ibn Hashim, grandson of the military leader Abd al Qadir
- Bordj Omar Driss – Commander Omar Driss (1931–1959)
- Bouraoui Belhadef – Bouraoui Ali Ben Cherif, a local hero of the national liberation war
- Constantine (Algeria) – Constantine the Great
- Didouche Mourad – Mourad Didouche, a veteran of the Algerian War of independence
- Draâ Ben Khedda - Benyoucef Benkhedda, Head of the Provisional Government of the Algerian Republic
- El Emir Abdelkader, Aïn Témouchent and Emir Abdelkader, Jijel – Emir Abdelkader
- Hassani Abdelkrim – Hassani Abdul Karim (d.1960)
- Hussein Dey (commune) – Hussein Dey
- Méchraâ Houari Boumédienne – Houari Boumédiène, President of Algeria
- Messaoud Boudjeriou – Messaoud Boudjeriou (1930–1961), Algerian revolutionary
- Mohammed Boudiaf (M'Sila) – Mohamed Boudiaf, President of Algeria
- Mostefa Ben Brahim, Sid Bel Abbès – Mostefa Ben Brahim (1800–1867), Algerian poet
- Ouled Brahem - Mohamed Bachir El Ibrahimi
- Ramdane Djamel – Ramdane Ahcène (1934–1962), hero of the national liberation
- Salah Bey (town) – Salah Bey ben Mostefa
- Salah Bouchaour – Salah Bouchaour (1933–1962), Algerian revolutionary martyr
- Sidi Bel Abbès – Sidi Bel Abbès El Bouzidi (d.1780), a Muslim marabout
- Sidi M'Hamed – Sidi M'hamed Bou Qobrine
- Zighoud Youcef (Town) – Youcef Zighoud, guerrilla leader
- Zmalet El Emir Abdelkader – Emir Abdelkader

Former:

- Berteaux was the name of Ouled Hamla – Henri Maurice Berteaux
- Bordj Le Prieur was the name of Bordj Badji Mokhtar – Louis-Ambroise Le Prieur (1908–1997)
- Burdeau was the name of Mahdia – Auguste Burdeau
- Colomb-Béchar was the name of Béchar – Louis de Colomb, French major general
- Duperré was the name of Aïn Defla – Guy-Victor Duperré, French naval officer
- Fort-Duquesne was the name of Kaous – Michel-Ange Duquesne de Menneville
- Georges Clemenceau was the name of Stidia – Georges Clemenceau
- Haussonvillers was the name of Naciria – Joseph d'Haussonville
- Mac-Mahon was the name of Aïn Touta – Patrice de MacMahon
- Molière was the name of Bordj Bounaama – Molière
- Negrier was the name of Chetouane – François de Négrier
- Orléansville was the name of Chlef – Louis Philippe II, Duke of Orléans
- Pascal was the name of Salah Bey – Blaise Pascal
- Perrégaux was the name of Mohammadia – Alexandre Charles Perrégaux
- Philippeville was the name of Skikda – Louis Philippe I
- Port-Gueydon was the name of Azeffoun – Louis Henri de Gueydon, Governor-General of Algeria
- Renault was the name of Sidi M'hamed Ben Ali – Pierre Hippolyte Publius Renault, French general
- Saint-Arnaud was the name of El Eulma – Jacques Leroy de Saint-Arnaud
- Saint-Eugène was the name of Bologhine – Eugène Guyot
- Tirman was the name of Teghalimet – Louis Tirman
- Waldeck-Rousseau was the name of Sidi Hosni – Pierre Waldeck-Rousseau

=== Angola ===
- Comandante Valódia (Luanda) – Joaquim Domingos Augusto "Valódia" (died 1975), one of the prominent generals during the Angolan War of Independence
- Hoji Ya Henda - Hoji-ya-Henda (1941-1968), Angolan Army commander
- Moçâmedes – Governor General of Angola, José D'Almeida Vasconcelos de Oliveira de Soveral e Carvalho, Baron of Mossâmedes (died 1805)
- Nelito Soares (Luanda) – Nelito Soares (1943–1975), Angolan revolutionary
- Patrice Lumumba, Luanda – Patrice Lumumba, Congolese Prime Minister
- Viana, Luanda – António Viana, Portuguese traveler and colonizer

Former:

- Carmona was the name of Uíge – Óscar Carmona, Portuguese president
- Henrique de Carvalho was the name of Saurimo – Henrique de Carvalho (1844–1909)
- Sá da Bandeira was the name of Lubango – Bernardo de Sá Nogueira de Figueiredo, 1st Marquis of Sá da Bandeira
- Serpa Pinto was the name of Menongue – Alexandre de Serpa Pinto, Portuguese explorer
- Silva Porto was the name of Cuito – António da Silva Porto
- Vila Arriaga was the name of Bibala – Portuguese president Manuel de Arriaga
- Vila Gago Coutinho was the name of Lumbala N'guimbo – Carlos Viegas Gago Coutinho
- Villa João de Almeida was the name of Chibia – João de Almeida (1873–1953), Portuguese military
- Vila Pereira d'Eça was the name of Ondjiva – António Júlio da Costa Pereira de Eça
- Vila Robert Williams was the name of Caála – Sir Robert Williams, 1st Baronet, of Park
- Vila Roçadas was the name of Xangongo – José Augusto Alves Roçadas
- Vila Salazar was the name of N'dalatando – António de Oliveira Salazar, Portuguese dictator
- Vila Teixeira da Silva was the name of Bailundo – Francisco Teixeira da Silva (1826–1894), Portuguese colonial administrator

=== Antigua and Barbuda ===
- Codrington, Antigua and Barbuda – Christopher Codrington
- Coolidge, Antigua and Barbuda – Hamilton Coolidge
- Piggotts – Richard Albert Louden Piggott (1844–1926)
- Tomlinson, Antigua and Barbuda – Major John Tomlinson

=== Argentina ===
==== Buenos Aires ====
- Abbott, Argentina - Samuel Abbott (engineer), General Manager of Buenos Aires Great Southern Railway Company
- Adolfo Gonzales Chaves, Buenos Aires - Adolfo Gonzales Chaves (1828-1887)
- Adrogué - Esteban Adrogué, founder
- Aldo Bonzi - Dr. Aldo Bonzi (1852–1935), Italian businessman
- Alejandro Korn, Buenos Aires - Dr. Alejandro Korn
- Alejandro Petión - Alexandre Pétion, Haitian President
- Ángel Etcheverry - Ángel Etcheverry, Minister of Public Works
- Arturo Vatteone - Dr. Arturo Dalmacio Vatteone
- Atilio Pessagno, Buenos Aires - Atilio Pessagno (1886-1965), judge
- Avellaneda – Nicolás Avellaneda, President of Argentina
- Banfield, Argentina - Edward Banfield (railroad engineer), General Manager of the Buenos Aires Great Southern Railway Company
- Barrio Kennedy (General Madariaga) - John F. Kennedy
- Béccar - Dr. Cosme Béccar, legislator
- Benito Juárez, Buenos Aires - Benito Juárez
- Berazategui - José Clemente Berazategui
- Bernal, Argentina - Don Pedro Bernal
- Berisso - Juan Berisso (founder)
- Billinghurst, Argentina - Mariano Billinghurst
- Canning, Argentina - George Canning, Prime Minister of the United Kingdom
- Capitán Sarmiento, Buenos Aires - Captain Domingo Fidel Sarmiento
- Carlos Casares, Buenos Aires - Carlos Casares (governor)
- Carlos Spegazzini, Buenos Aires - Carlo Luigi Spegazzini
- Carlos Tejedor, Buenos Aires - Carlos Tejedor (politician)
- Castelli, Buenos Aires - Juan José Castelli
- Ciudad Evita (means Evita City) – Eva Perón, First Lady of Argentina
- Ciudad Madero, Argentina - Francisco Bernabé Madero
- Coronel Dorrego - Manuel Dorrego
- Coronel Martínez de Hoz - Miguel Federico Martínez de Hoz
- Coronel Pringles - Juan Pascual Pringles
- Coronel Suárez - Manuel Isidoro Suárez
- Coronel Vidal - Celestino Vidal, a hero of the Argentine War of Independence
- Don Torcuato - Marcelo Torcuato de Alvear
- Daireaux - Émile Honoré Daireaux (1843-1916)
- Diego Gaynor - Diego James Gaynor (1807-1892), Irish pioneer
- Domselaar - Dr. Antonie van Domselaar (1789-1861), Dutch medical doctor
- Don Bosco, Buenos Aires - John Bosco
- Dudignac - Exequiel Dudignac
- Esteban Echeverría Partido - Esteban Echeverría, novelist
- Florencio Varela, Buenos Aires - Florencio Varela (writer)
- Florentino Ameghino, Buenos Aires - Florentino Ameghino
- Galo Llorente - Galo Llorente (1850-1946), Spanish immigrant
- General Alvear, Buenos Aires - Carlos María de Alvear
- General Arenales, Buenos Aires - Juan Antonio Álvarez de Arenales
- (General) Belgrano – Manuel Belgrano
- General Conesa, Buenos Aires - Emilio Conesa
- General Daniel Cerri - Daniel Cerri (1841-1914)
- General Guido - Tomás Guido
- General Juan Madariaga - Juan Madariaga
- General La Madrid - Gregorio Aráoz de Lamadrid
- General Las Heras, Buenos Aires - Juan Gregorio de las Heras
- General Lavalle - Juan Lavalle
- General Pacheco - Ángel Pacheco
- General Pinto - Manuel Guillermo Pinto
- General Pirán - General José María Pirán (1804-1871)
- General Pueyrredón – Juan Martín de Pueyrredón
- General Rivas - Ignacio Rivas
- General Rodríguez - Martín Rodríguez (politician)
- General Rojo - General Anselmo Rojo (1799-1869)
- General Villegas - Conrado Villegas
- Gobernador Castro - Emilio Castro (1820-1899), Governor of Buenos Aires
- Gobernador Ugarte - Marcelino Ugarte, Governor of Buenos Aires
- Henderson, Argentina - Frank Henderson (1858-1935), Director of the Buenos Aires Midland Railway Company
- Hilario Ascasubi, Buenos Aires - Hilario Ascasubi, poet
- Hipólito Yrigoyen Partido - President Hipólito Yrigoyen
- Hudson, Argentina - William Henry Hudson
- Ingeniero Adolfo Sourdeaux - Adolfo Sourdeaux (1819-1883), French engineer
- Ingeniero Maschwitz - Carlos Maschwitz (1862-1910), Minister of Public Works
- Ingeniero Moneta - Pompeyo Moneta (1830-1898), Italian engineer and architect
- Ingeniero Pablo Nogués - Pablo Nogués (1878-1943), Administrator of Argentine State Railway company
- Ingeniero White - Guillermo White (1844-1926), President of the Argentine Centre of Engineers
- Irineo Portela - Dr. Irineo Portela (1806-1861), physician
- Isidro Casanova - Isidro Casanova, pioneering owner of a textile factory
- José León Suárez (General San Martín) - Dr. José León Suárez (1872-1929)
- José María Jáuregui, Buenos Aires - José María Jáuregui, spanish businessman
- Jeppener - Willem Jeppener (1830-1915), German landowner
- Joaquín Gorina - Joaquín Gorina, former landowner
- José C. Paz, Buenos Aires - José C. Paz
- José Ingenieros, Buenos Aires - Dr. José Ingenieros
- José Juan Almeyra - Dr. José Juan Almeyra (1828-1885)
- José Mármol, Buenos Aires - José Mármol
- Juan. A Pradere - Juan Adan Prader, land donor
- Juan F. Ibarra - Juan Felipe Ibarra
- Leandro N. Alem, Buenos Aires - Leandro N. Alem
- Lincoln, Buenos Aires - Abraham Lincoln
- Manuel B. Gonnet - Manuel Bernardo Gonnet, first provincial minister of Public Works
- Maquinista Francisco Savio - Francisco Savio (1882-1963), machinist of the Buenos Aires and Rosario Railway Company
- Marcos Paz, Buenos Aires - Marcos Paz
- Mariano Acosta, Buenos Aires - Mariano Acosta (politician)
- Mariano H. Alfonzo - Mariano H. Alfonzo (1848-1913), landowner
- Mariano Unzué - Mariano Cecilio Unzué (1873-1936), owner of the San Carlos ranch
- Martín Coronado, Buenos Aires - Martín Coronado (1849-1919), poet
- Martínez, Buenos Aires - Ladislao Martínez, landowner
- Matheu, Buenos Aires - Domingo Matheu
- Máximo Fernández - Maximo Fernandez, land donor
- Mayor Buratovich - Jakov Buratović (1846-1909), Croatian military engineer
- Munro, Buenos Aires - Duncan Mackay Munro (1844–1929), General Manager of Central Córdoba Railway Company
- Muñiz, Buenos Aires - Dr. Francisco Javier Muñiz
- Navarro, Buenos Aires - Captain Miguel Navarro
- Nicolás Descalzi - Nicolás Descalzi, surveyor
- Norberto de La Riestra - Norberto de la Riestra (1820-1879), Minister of Finance of the Argentine Confederation
- O'Brien, Argentina - Edward O'Brien (1836–1912), Irish founder
- Olavarría, Argentina - Colonel José Valentín de Olavarría (1801–1845)
- Pablo Podestá, Buenos Aires - Pablo Podestá, stage actor
- Pellegrini, Buenos Aires - Carlos Pellegrini, President of Argentina
- Pérez Millán - Narcisa Pérez Millán, founder
- Piñeiro, Buenos Aires - Trinidad and Felipe Piñeiro, founders
- Pirovano - Dr. Ignacio Pirovano (1844-1895)
- Plomer, Buenos Aires - Pedro Plomer Huguet, grandfather of a town´s founder
- Presidente Perón Partido – Juan Perón, President of Argentina
- Pueblo Doyle - Dr. Eduardo Doyle (1873-1948)
- Rafael Calzada, Buenos Aires – Rafael Calzada Fernández (1854-1929), Spanish Argentine attorney and legal theorist
- Rafael Castillo, Buenos Aires – Rafael Castillo (1862-1918), lawyer and politician
- Rafael Obligado, Buenos Aires – Rafael Obligado, poet
- Ramallo, Buenos Aires – Bartolomé Ramallo, early settler
- Ramos Mejía – Matías Ramos Mejía (1810-1885)
- Ranelagh, Buenos Aires - Richard Jones, 1st Earl of Ranelagh
- Rauch, Buenos Aires - Colonel Federico Rauch
- Remedios de Escalada - María de los Remedios de Escalada
- Rincón de Milberg - Juan Milberg (1826–1883), Justice of the Peace
- Ringuelet, Buenos Aires - Engineer Augusto Ringuelet (d.1915), Manager of Buenos Aires Western Railway Company
- Rivadavia Department – Bernardino Rivadavia, First President of Argentina
- Roosevelt (Buenos Aires) - Theodore Roosevelt
- Roque Pérez - José Roque Pérez (1815-1871)
- Sáenz Peña, Buenos Aires - Luis Sáenz Peña, President of Argentina
- San Andrés de Giles - Saint Andrew
- San Antonio de Areco - Anthony of Padua
- San Antonio de Padua - Anthony of Padua
- San Bernardo del Tuyú - Bernard of Clairvaux
- San Carlos de Bolívar - Charles Borromeo and Simon Bolivar
- San Carlos, La Plata - Charles Borromeo
- San Cayetano, Buenos Aires - Saint Cajetan
- San Clemente del Tuyú - Pope Clement I
- San Fernando, Buenos Aires - Ferdinand VII of Spain
- San Francisco Solano - Francis Solanus
- San Isidro, Buenos Aires - Isidore the Laborer
- San José, Buenos Aires - Saint Joseph
- San Justo, Buenos Aires - Justo Villegas, a prominent landowner
- (General) San Martín – José de San Martín
- San Miguel del Monte - Saint Michael
- San Miguel, Buenos Aires - Saint Michael
- San Nicolás de los Arroyos - Saint Nicholas
- San Pedro, Buenos Aires - Saint Peter
- San Vicente, Buenos Aires - Vincent Ferrer
- Santa Clara del Mar - Clara de Anchorena, original owner of the area
- Santa Coloma, Buenos Aires - Carlos Santa Coloma, landowner
- Santa Lucía, Buenos Aires - Vicenta Lucia Culligan (1835-1898), wife of an Irish founder
- Santa Teresita, Buenos Aires - Thérèse of Lisieux
- Temperley, Argentina - George Temperley, British landowner
- Timote - Lieutenant Colonel Pedro Timote
- Tornquist, Buenos Aires - Ernesto Tornquist
- Tristán Suárez - Valentin Tristán Suárez (1856-1907) railway pioneer donor of land to the Buenos Aires Great Southern Railway company
- Urdampilleta - Nicanor Urdampilleta (founder)
- Valentín Alsina, Buenos Aires – Valentín Alsina
- Valeria del Mar - Valeria Guerrero Cárdenas de Russo (1900-1992), founder
- Verónica, Buenos Aires - Veronica Bernal (1885-1956), wife of a land donor
- Vicente Casares - Vicente Lorenzo del Rosario Casares (1844-1910), rancher and politician
- Vicente López, Buenos Aires – Vicente López y Planes
- Victoria, Buenos Aires - Queen Victoria
- Villa Adelina - Adelina Munro Drysdale, Scottish socialité
- Villa Alsina – Valentín Alsina
- Villa Ballester - Dr. Pedro Ballester (1849–1928), First municipal mayor of the General San Martín Partido
- Villa Bonich (General San Martín) - Luis Bonich, landowner
- Villa Bosch - the Bosch Family
- Villa Celina - Celina Madero
- Villa Coronel José María Zapiola - José Matías Zapiola
- Villa Elisa, Buenos Aires - Elisa Uriburu (1865-1910)
- Villa Elvira - Elvira Sotes de Ponsati
- Villa General Mitre – Bartolomé Mitre
- Villa General Savio - Manuel Savio
- Villa Gesell - Carlos Idaho Gesell (1891–1979) and his father Silvio Gesell
- Villa Godoy Cruz (General San Martín) - Tomás Godoy Cruz
- Villa Gregoria Matorras - Gregoria Matorras, mother of José de San Martín
- Villa Lynch - General Francisco Lynch (1795-1840)
- Villa María Irene de los Remedios de Escalada - María de los Remedios de Escalada, wife of José de San Martín
- Villa Marqués Alejandro María de Aguado - Alejandro María Aguado, 1st Marquess of Marismas del Guadalquivir
- Villa Martelli – César Martelli, landowner
- Villa Parque Presidente Figueroa Alcorta - José Figueroa Alcorta, President of Argentina
- Villa Raffo – Ezequiel and Pedro Raffo, landowners
- Villa Sarmiento – Domingo Faustino Sarmiento, President of Argentina
- Villa Tesei – Santos Tesei (1893-1961), pioneer
- Villa Udaondo – Guillermo Udaondo (1859–1922), Governor of Buenos Aires
- Wilde, Buenos Aires – Dr. José Antonio Wilde (1813–1887)
- William C. Morris, Buenos Aires - William Case Morris (1864–1932), founder of the first Methodist Chapel in Argentina
- Zenón Videla Dorna - Zenón Videla Dorna, landowner

==== Catamarca ====
- Adolfo E. Carranza - Adolfo Esteban Carranza (1824-1896)
- Fray Mamerto Esquiú Department - Mamerto Esquiú, Bishop of Córdoba who was born in Catamarca
- Santa María, Catamarca - Mary, mother of Jesus
- Santa Rosa Department, Catamarca - Rose of Lima

==== Chaco ====
- Almirante Brown Department – William Brown (admiral), commander in chief of the Argentine Navy
- Capitán Solari - Captain Facundo Solari (d.1912)
- Colonia Elisa – Elisa de Capozzolo, wife of the founder
- Comandante Fernández Department – Carlos Domingo Fernández (1873-1915), military and founder
- Enrique Urién - Enrique Urién, former official of the Santa Fe railway company
- Fray Justo Santa María de Oro Department – Fray Justo de Santa María de Oro
- General Belgrano Department, Chaco – Manuel Belgrano
- General Capdevila – General Alberto Capdevila (1856-1905)
- General Donovan Department – Antonio Dónovan (1849-1897), Territorial governor of Chaco
- General Güemes Department, Chaco – Martín Miguel de Güemes
- General Pinedo, Chaco - Agustín Pinedo (1789-1852)
- Juan José Castelli, Chaco – Juan José Castelli
- Libertador General San Martín Department, Chaco – José de San Martín
- Margarita Belén - Margarita and Belén Benítez (1875-1958), daughters of a founder
- Mayor Luis Jorge Fontana Department – Luis Jorge Fontana
- O'Higgins Department – Bernardo O'Higgins, Chilean independence hero
- Presidencia de la Plaza – Victorino de la Plaza, President of Argentina
- Presidencia Roca - Julio Argentino Roca, President of Argentina
- Presidencia Roque Sáenz Peña – Roque Sáenz Peña, President of Argentina
- Pueblo Clodomiro Díaz - Clodomiro Díaz, early settler
- Puerto Eva Perón – Eva Perón
- Puerto Lavalle - Juan Lavalle
- Puerto Vicentini - Ángel Vicentini, founder
- Santa Sylvina - Silvana Estrada Lynch, wife of a Chairman of the Board of Directors of the "Tres Mojones Society"
- Sargento Cabral Department – Juan Bautista Cabral
- Villa Ángela – Ángela Joostens, wife of Julio Ulises Martin
- Villa Berthet - Juana Berthet, wife of a general director of Limited Forestry Company

==== Chubut ====
- Aldea Beleiro – Rafael Beleiro (1890-1986), former settler and merchant of the place
- Biedma Department - Francisco de Viedma y Narváez
- Bruno Joaquín Thomae - Bruno Joaquín Thomae (1897-1952), railway engineer
- Comodoro Rivadavia – Martín Rivadavia (1852-1901), shipping minister
- Doctor Atilio Oscar Viglione – Atilio Oscar Viglione (1914–2010), Governor of Chubut
- Doctor Ricardo Rojas – Ricardo Rojas (writer)
- Escalante Department – Dr. Wenceslao Escalante, Minister of Agriculture
- Facundo, Chubut - Juan Facundo Quiroga
- General Mosconi, Chubut – Enrique Mosconi
- Gobernador Costa, Chubut – Manuel Costa (d.1925), Territorial governor of Chubut
- José de San Martín, Chubut – José de San Martín
- Puerto Madryn - Sir Love Jones-Parry, 1st Baronet of Madryn
- Puerto Visser - Conrado Visser, rancher
- Rada Tilly - Marquess Francisco Everardo Tilly y Paredes
- Rawson – Guillermo Rawson
- Río Mayo, Chubut - Gregorio Mayo (1853-1928), first mayor of Rawson
- Río Pico, Chubut - engineer Octavio Pico Burgess (1837–1892)
- Sarmiento – Domingo Faustino Sarmiento, President of Argentina
- Trelew – Lewis Jones
- Villa Dique Florentino Ameghino – Florentino Ameghino

==== Córdoba ====
- Adelia María - Adelia María Harilaos de Olmos (1865-1949), philanthropist
- Alejandro Roca (Córdoba) - Major Alejandro Roca, Julio Argentino Roca's brother
- Alejo Ledesma - Alejo Ledesma (founder)
- Almafuerte (Córdoba) - Pedro Bonifacio Palacios
- Ana Zumarán - Ana Sáenz de Zumarán (d.1910), wife of a governor
- Benjamín Gould (Córdoba) - Benjamin Apthorp Gould, American astronomer
- Berrotarán (Córdoba) - Nicolás Berrotarán, land donor
- Bialet Massé - Juan Bialet Massé, Spanish businessman
- Brinkmann, Córdoba - Julius Brinkmann, German entrepreneur
- Camilo Aldao - Camilo Aldao, former military of the unitarian forces
- Colonia Bismarck - Otto von Bismarck
- Colonia Videla - the Videla family
- Coronel Baigorria - Manuel Baigorria
- Coronel Moldes (Córdoba) - José Moldes
- Dalmacio Vélez Sarsfield, Argentina - Dalmacio Vélez Sarsfield
- Deán Funes, Argentina - Gregorio Funes, a writer and deacon of the Archdiocese of Córdoba
- General Baldissera - Antonio Baldissera, Italian general
- General Cabrera - Jerónimo Luis de Cabrera, founder of Córdoba
- General Deheza - Román Deheza (1791-1872)
- General Fotheringham - Ignacio Hamilton Fotheringham (1842-1925), British general
- Gutemberg (Córdoba) - Johannes Gutenberg
- James Craik (Córdoba) - James Craik (1848-1902), Manager of Central Argentine Railway Company
- José de la Quintana (Córdoba) - José de la Quintana (1810-1881)
- Justiniano Posse - Justiniano Posse (1820-1865), Governor of Córdoba
- La Carlota, Argentina - Charles III of Spain
- Lucio V. Mansilla (Córdoba) - Lucio Victorio Mansilla
- Maquinista Gallini - Carlos Gallini (1880-1921), railway driver for the Central Argentine Railway company
- Marcos Juárez - Marcos Juárez (1843-1900), Governor of Cordoba
- Monte Cristo - Jesus
- Morrison (Córdoba) - Walter Morrison (1836-1921), President of Central Argentine Railway Company
- Nicolás Bruzone - Nicolás Bruzone (founder)
- Noetinger - Fernando Noetinger (founder)
- Obispo Trejo - Fernando Trexo y Senabria
- Ordóñez (Córdoba) - Victorino Ordóñez, rancher
- Pacheco de Melo (Córdoba) - José Andrés Pacheco de Melo
- Santiago Temple - Santiago Temple, founder and pioneer
- Saturnino María Laspiur (Córdoba) - Saturnino María Laspiur
- Sebastián Elcano (Córdoba) - Juan Sebastián Elcano
- Silvio Pellico (Córdoba) - Silvio Pellico
- Vicuña Mackenna, Argentina - Benjamín Vicuña Mackenna
- Villa Allende - the Allende Brothers
- Villa Carlos Paz - Carlos Nicandro Paz, founder
- Villa Cura Brochero - Jose Gabriel del Rosario Brochero
- Villa Fontana (Córdoba) - Angelo Serafino Fontana
- Villa General Belgrano - Manuel Belgrano
- Villa Giardino - Juan Giardino, owner of Altos de San Pedro
- Villa Huidobro - José Ruiz Huidobro, governor of San Luis Province
- Villa María, Córdoba - María Luisa Dominga Ocampo (1863-1935), daughter of a founder
- Villa Sarmiento (General Roca) - Domingo Faustino Sarmiento
- Villa Valeria - Valeria Crotto, daughter of José Crotto, a founder
- Washington (Córdoba) - George Washington
- Wenceslao Escalante (Córdoba) - Wenceslao Escalante (1852-1912)

==== Corrientes ====
- Alvear, Corrientes - Carlos María de Alvear
- Berón de Astrada Department - Genaro Berón de Astrada (1801-1839), Governor of Corrientes
- Cecilio Echevarría, Corrientes - Colonel Cecilio Echevarría
- Colonia Carlos Pellegrini - Carlos Pellegrini, President of Argentina
- Concepción, Corrientes - Immaculate Conception of Mary
- Estación Torrent (Corrientes) - Juan Eusebio Torrent (1834-1901), provincial senator
- Felipe Yofre - Felipe Yofre (1848-1939), Minister of the Interior and briefly Minister of Foreign Affairs
- Garaví (Corrientes) - Cacique Garaví
- General Paz Department - General José María Paz
- Gobernador Juan E. Martínez - Juan Esteban Martínez (1846-1909), Governor of Corrientes
- Gobernador Virasoro - Valentín Virasoro (1842-1925), a field engineer and former governor
- Goya, Argentina - Gregoria Morales, also known as Doña Goya
- Juan Pujol, Argentina - Governor Juan Gregorio Pujol
- Lavalle, Corrientes - Galo Lavalle
- Mariano I. Loza - Mariano Indalecio Loza (1850-1920), Governor of Corrientes
- Mercedes, Corrientes - Virgin of Mercy
- San Carlos (Corrientes) - Charles Borromeo
- San Cosme, Corrientes - Saint Cosmas
- San Lorenzo (Corrientes) - Saint Lawrence
- San Luis del Palmar - Louis IX of France
- San Miguel, Corrientes - Saint Michael
- San Roque, Corrientes - Saint Roch
- Santa Lucía, Corrientes - Saint Lucy
- Santo Tomé, Corrientes - Thomas the Apostle

==== Entre Ríos ====
- Basavilbaso - General Manuel Basavilbaso
- Clodomiro Ledesma - Clodomiro Ledesma, landowner
- Colonia Hocker - Enrique Hoker
- Crespo, Entre Ríos - Manuel Crespo (1820-1887), Governor of Entre Rios
- Enrique Carbó, Argentina - Enrique Carbó Ortiz (1861-1920), Governor of Entre Rios
- General Almada - General Apolinario Almada
- General Campos - Luis María Campos
- General Galarza - Justo José de Urquiza
- General Ramírez - Francisco Ramírez (governor)
- Gilbert, Entre Ríos - Torcuato Gilbert (1848-1906)
- Gobernador Etchevehere - Luis Etchevehere (1875-1935), Governor of Entre Rios
- Gobernador Mansilla - Lucio Norberto Mansilla
- Ingeniero Miguel Sajaroff - Mikhail Sakharov (1873-1958), Russian founder of the Agrarian Fraternity Cooperative
- San Salvador, Entre Ríos - Aurora Saint-Sauveur (d.1917), mother of the founder

==== Formosa ====
- Clorinda, Formosa - Clorinda Pietranera de Bossi (1848-1918)
- Comandante Fontana - Luis Jorge Fontana
- Estanislao del Campo, Formosa - Estanislao del Campo, poet
- General Lucio V. Mansilla (town) - Lucio Norberto Mansilla
- General Manuel Belgrano - Manuel Belgrano
- Ibarreta - Pedro Enrique de Ibarreta y Uhagon (1859-1899)
- Ingeniero Juárez - Engineer Guillermo Nicasio Juárez
- Mayor Vicente Villafañe - Major Vicente Villafañe, desert explorer
- Patiño Department - Father Gabriel Patiño (1662-1729), jesuit missioner and explorer
- Ramón Lista Department - Ramón Lista
- San Francisco de Laishi - Francis of Assisi
- Villa General Güemes - Martín Miguel de Güemes

==== Jujuy ====
- Abdón Castro Tolay - Abdón Castro Tolay (1899-1989), rural teacher
- Iturbe, Jujuy - Octavio Iturbe (1871-1927), railway engineer of the Central Northern Railway Company
- Libertador General San Martín, Jujuy - José de San Martín
- San Antonio, Jujuy - Anthony of Padua
- San Salvador de Jujuy - Jesus (the Savior)
- Santa Bárbara Department, Jujuy - Saint Barbara
- Santa Catalina, Jujuy - Catherine of Alexandria

==== La Pampa ====
- Adolfo Van Praet - Adolfo Van Praet, Belgian diplomay and Board Member of the Buenos Aires Western Railway company
- Ataliva Roca - Antonio Ataliva Roca (1839-1912), Julio Argentino Roca´s brother
- Bernardo Larroudé - Bernardo Larroudé (1796-1887), member founder of the Buenos Aires Western Railway company
- Bernasconi, Argentina - Alfonso Bernasconi
- Colonia Barón - Wilfrid Barón Vera (1863-1925), French rancher
- Coronel Hilario Lagos - Colonel Hilario Lagos (1840-1895)
- Eduardo Castex - Engineer Eduardo Castex (1854-1912), national deputy
- Embajador Martini - Ferdinando Martini
- General Acha - Mariano Acha
- General Manuel Campos - Manuel Jorge Campos (1847-1908)
- General Pico - Eduardo Pico (1834-1904), Terriorial governor of La Pampa
- General San Martín, La Pampa - José de San Martín
- Gobernador Duval - Miguel Duval (1877-1960), Terriorial governor of La Pampa
- Ingeniero Foster - Henry Foster (1808-1865), British engineer
- Ingeniero Luiggi - Luigi Luiggi
- Intendente Alvear - Carlos Torcuato de Alvear (1860-1931)
- Jacinto Arauz - Jacinto Arauz, landowner
- Mauricio Mayer - Mauricio Mayer (1842-1917), Chairman of the Board of Directors of the Western Railway
- Miguel Cané, La Pampa - Miguel Cané
- Miguel Riglos - Miguel Riglos (1790-1863), federal deputy
- Ricardo Lavalle (La Pampa) - Ricardo Cipriano Lavalle (1830-1911), rancher
- Speluzzi - Bernardino Speluzzi (1835-1898), Professor of Mathematics in the Department of Exact Sciences at the National University of Buenos Aires
- Teniente General Emilio Mitre (La Pampa) - Emilio Mitre
- Tomás Manuel de Anchorena, La Pampa - Tomás de Anchorena
- Uriburu, La Pampa – General Napoleón Uriburu (1836-1895)
- Vértiz - Juan José de Vértiz y Salcedo
- Victorica - Benjamín Victorica (1831-1913)
- Winifreda - Winifred Maud Drysdale Gibson (1899–1983), daughter of Joseph Drysdale, Scottish investor

==== La Rioja ====
- Castelli – Juan José Castelli
- Castro Barros, La Rioja - Pedro Ignacio de Castro Barros
- Colonia Ortiz de Ocampo - General Francisco Ortiz de Ocampo (1771-1840)
- Coronel Felipe Varela Department - Colonel Felipe Varela (1821-1870)
- Desiderio Tello - Desiderio Tello, landowner
- General Ángel Vicente Peñaloza Department - General Ángel Vicente Peñaloza
- General Belgrano Department, La Rioja - Manuel Belgrano
- General Juan Facundo Quiroga Department - General Facundo Quiroga
- General Lamadrid Department - General Gregorio Aráoz de Lamadrid
- General San Martín Department, La Rioja - José de San Martín
- Miranda, La Rioja - Captain Juan de Miranda, first landowner
- Rosario Vera Peñaloza Department – Rosario Vera Peñaloza (1873–1950), Argentine educator and pedagogue
- San Blas de los Sauces - Saint Blaise
- San Miguel, La Rioja - Saint Michael
- Termas de Santa Teresita - Therese of Liseux

==== Mendoza ====
- Bowen (Mendoza) - Sir Albert Bowen, 1st Baronet, General Manager of the Buenos Aires Western Railway Company
- General Alvear, Mendoza - Carlos María de Alvear
- Godoy Cruz, Mendoza - Dr. Tomás Godoy Cruz, statesman and businessman
- Goudge - James Alfred Goudge (1862-1955), General Manager of Buenos Aires & Pacific Railway Company
- Ingeniero Giagnoni - Cristobal Giagnoni (1837-1890), Italian civil engineer
- Ingeniero Gustavo André - Gustave Joseph André de Glymes (1850-1924), Belgian agricultural engineer
- Jaime Prats (Mendoza) - Jaime Prats, Spanish landowner
- Las Heras – Juan Gregorio de las Heras
- Luján de Cuyo - Our Lady of Luján
- Medrano (Mendoza) - Pedro Medrano
- Mendoza, Argentina - García Hurtado de Mendoza, 5th Marquis of Cañete
- Philipps (Mendoza) - John Philipps, 1st Viscount St Davids, President of Buenos Aires & Pacific Railway Company
- Rivadavia, Mendoza - Bernardino Rivadavia
- Rodríguez Peña (Mendoza) - Nicolás Rodríguez Peña
- Russell (Mendoza) - Cecil Henry Stuart Russell (1889-1916), Australian engineer of the Buenos Aires & Pacific Railway Company
- San Carlos, Mendoza - Charles III of Spain
- San Rafael, Mendoza - Rafael de Sobremonte, 3rd Marquis of Sobremonte
- Ugarteche (Mendoza) - José Francisco Ugarteche, Paraguayan jurist and politician

==== Misiones ====
- Alba Posse - Engineer Rodolfo Alba Posse (1880-1937), founder
- Almafuerte, Misiones - Pedro Bonifacio Palacios (Almafuerte)
- Aristóbulo del Valle, Misiones - Aristóbulo del Valle
- Azara, Misiones - Félix de Azara
- Bernardo de Irigoyen, Misiones - Bernardo de Irigoyen
- Bonpland (Misiones) - Aimé Bonpland
- Colonia Alberdi - Juan Bautista Alberdi
- Colonia Aurora - Aurora Palia Quesini, mother of the founder
- Colonia Victoria - Queen Victoria
- Comandante Andresito - Andrés Guazurary
- Florentino Ameghino, Misiones - Florentino Ameghino
- General Alvear, Misiones - Carlos María de Alvear
- General Urquiza - Justo José de Urquiza
- Gobernador López - Gregorio López (1857-1927), Governor of Misiones
- Gobernador Roca - Rudecindo Roca (1850-1903), Territorial Governor of Misiones
- Hipólito Yrigoyen, Misiones - Hipólito Yrigoyen
- Leandro N. Alem, Misiones - Leandro N. Alem, one of the founders of the Radical Civic Union
- Montecarlo, Misiones - Carlos Culmey (1879-1939), German civil engineer
- Nemesio Parma (Misiones) - Nemesio Celestino Parma, Posadeño Hero who died during The Villa Franca Tragedy in 1922
- Oberá - Cacique Oberá
- Olegario Víctor Andrade, Misiones - Olegario Víctor Andrade
- Pueblo Illia (Misiones) – Arturo Umberto Illia, President of Argentina
- Puerto Leoni - Virginio Faustino Leoni (1897-1971), founder
- Posadas, Misiones - Gervasio Antonio de Posadas
- Ruiz de Montoya - Antonio Ruiz de Montoya
- San Antonio, Misiones - Anthony of Padua
- San Ignacio, Argentina - Ignatius of Loyola
- San Javier, Misiones - Francis Xavier
- San José, Misiones - Saint Joseph
- San Martín, Misiones - José de San Martín
- San Pedro, Misiones - Saint Peter
- San Vicente, Misiones - Vincent de Paul
- Santa Ana, Misiones - Saint Anne
- Santa María, Misiones - Mary, mother of Jesus
- Santiago de Liniers, Misiones - Santiago de Liniers, 1st Count of Buenos Aires
- Villa Roulet (Misiones) - Marc Étienne Roulet (1895-1969), Swiss pioneer
- Wanda, Argentina - Dr. Wanda Piłsudska, daughter of Józef Piłsudski

==== Neuquen ====
- Octavio Pico - Octavio Sergio Pico (1867-1943)
- Plottier - Dr. Alberto Plottier (1871-1941), Uruguayan physician who was a founder of the town
- Ramón M. Castro - engineer Ramón Castro
- San Martín de los Andes - José de San Martín

==== Rio Negro ====
- Allen, Río Negro - Henry Charles Allen (1856-1935), member of the Buenos Aires Great Southern Railway company
- Barrio Presidente Perón (Río Negro) - Juan Domingo Perón
- Cipolletti - César Cipolletti (1843-1908), Italian water engineer
- Clemente Onelli, Río Negro - Clemente Onelli (1864-1924), Italian naturalist
- Contralmirante Cordero - Bartolomé Leónidas Cordero (1830-1892)
- Darwin, Río Negro - Charles Darwin
- Ferri (Río Negro) - Enrico Ferri (criminologist)
- General Conesa, Río Negro - Emilio Conesa
- General Enrique Godoy - Enrique Godoy (1850-1912), expeditioner of the Desert conquest
- General Fernández Oro - General Manuel Fernández Oro
- General Roca, Río Negro - Julio Argentino Roca
- Ingeniero Jacobacci - Guido Jacobacci (1863-1922), General Director of Patagonian Railways
- Ingeniero Luis A. Huergo - Luis Huergo
- Ingeniero Otto Krause - Otto Krause
- Lamarque, Argentina - Dr. Facundo Lamarque
- Luis Beltrán, Río Negro - Fray Luis Beltrán
- Ministro Ramos Mexía - Ezequiel Ramos Mexía (1852-1935)
- San Carlos de Bariloche - Carlos Wiederhold
- Sargento Vidal - Major sergeant Miguel Vidal
- Viedma, Río Negro - Francisco de Viedma y Narváez, founder
- Villa Mascardi - 17th century Jesuit Nicolás Mascardi
- Villa Regina - Regina Pacini, first lady of Argentina

==== Salta ====
- Apolinario Saravia, Salta - Apolinario Saravia (1791-1844)
- Capitán Juan Pagé - Captain John Pagé (1842-1890)
- Coronel Cornejo - José Antonio Fernández Cornejo (1768-1850), Governor of Salta
- Coronel Juan Solá - Juan Nepomuceno Solá, two time governor of Salta
- Coronel Moldes - Colonel José de Moldes
- Coronel Mollinedo - Eusebio Martínez de Mollinedo (1794-1841), a local independence hero
- Coronel Olleros - Tomás Olleros Mansilla (1838-1890)
- General Ballivián - José Ballivián
- General Güemes, Salta - Martín Miguel de Güemes
- General Mosconi, Salta - Enrique Mosconi
- General Pizarro - Ramón García de León y Pizarro
- Hipólito Yrigoyen, Salta - Hipólito Yrigoyen
- Joaquín V. González, Argentina - Joaquín V. González
- Salvador Mazza, Salta - Dr. Salvador Mazza
- San Ramón de la Nueva Orán - Ramón García de León y Pizarro

==== San Juan ====
- General San Martín, San Juan - José de San Martín
- Iglesia Department - the Iglesia family
- Rivadavia, San Juan - Bernardino Rivadavia
- San Juan, Argentina - John the Baptist or Juan Jufré, founder
- Villa Aberastain - Antonino Aberastain (1810-1861), Governor of San Juan
- Villa Basilio Nievas - Basilio Nievas, farmer
- Villa Don Bosco - John Bosco
- Villa Ibáñez - José Ibáñez, developer
- Villa Krause - engineer Domingo Krause (1861-1941)
- Villa Paula Albarracín de Sarmiento - Paula Albarracín de Sarmiento (1774-1861), mother of Domingo Faustino Sarmiento
- Villa del Salvador - Jesus and Salvador María del Carril, Vice President of Argentina

==== San Luis ====
- Anchorena, San Luis - the Anchorena Family
- Beazley - Francisco Julián Beazley (1864-1924), Federal interventor of San Luis
- Carolina, San Luis - Charles III of Spain
- General Pedernera Department - Juan Esteban Pedernera
- Gobernador Dupuy Department, San Luis - Vicente Dupuy (1774-1843), Lieutenant Governor of San Luis
- Juan Llerena, San Luis - Juan Llerena (1825-1900), province senator
- Justo Daract, San Luis - Justo Daract, first governor of San Luis
- Leandro N. Alem, San Luis - Leandro N. Alem
- Martín de Loyola - Martín García Óñez de Loyola
- San Luis, Argentina - Louis IX of France
- Villa Elena, San Luis - Maria Elena de la Mota, daughter of an early settler
- Villa General Roca - Julio Argentino Roca
- Villa Larca - Cacique Larca
- Villa Mercedes - Virgin of Mercy
- Villa Reynolds - Francisco Reynolds

==== Santa Cruz ====
- Comandante Luis Piedrabuena - Luis Piedrabuena
- Fitz Roy, Santa Cruz - Robert FitzRoy, British officer of the Royal Navy
- Gobernador Gregores - Juan Manuel Gregores (1893-1947)
- Gobernador Mayer - Edelmiro Mayer
- Gobernador Moyano - Carlos María Moyano (1854-1910)
- Jaramillo (Santa Cruz) - Gregorio Jaramillo, sergeant in General Belgrano's army
- Julia Dufour - Julia M. Dufour (1836-1878), Argentine pioneer in Patagonia
- Mazaredo - Jose de Mazarredo y Salazar
- Perito Moreno, Santa Cruz - Francisco Moreno
- Puerto Coig (Santa Cruz) - Second Lieutenant Claudio Coig Sansón (1761-1830)
- Ramón Lista (Santa Cruz) - Ramón Lista
- Tellier - Charles Tellier, french engineer

==== Santa Fe ====
- Aarón Castellanos, Santa Fe - Aarón Castellanos, founder
- Acebal, Argentina - Amador Acebal, founder
- Álvarez, Argentina - the Álvarez Family
- Alvear, Santa Fe - Carlos María de Alvear
- Armstrong, Argentina - Thomas Armstrong (1797–1875), Irish pioneer in the development of the Central Argentine Railway company
- Bernardo de Irigoyen, Santa Fe - Bernardo de Irigoyen
- Bouquet, Argentina - ex-federal senator Carlos María Bouquet
- Cafferatta, Santa Fe - Juan Manuel Cafferata, 25th Governor of Santa Fe Province
- Capitán Bermúdez - Captain Justo Bermúdez
- Carlos Pellegrini, Santa Fe - Carlos Pellegrini
- Christophersen . Peter Christophersen
- Colonia Montefiore - Moses Montefiore
- Coronel Arnold, Santa Fe - Manuel Brown Arnold, founder
- Felicia, Argentina - Felicia Ramón, wife of a founder
- Fortín Olmos - General Olmos, who was an assistant of Manuel Obligado
- Franck, Argentina - Mauricio Franck, founder
- Fray Luis Beltrán, Santa Fe - Luis Beltrán, franciscan friar
- Fuentes, Santa Fe - Juan Fuentes, founder
- Funes, Santa Fe - Pedro Lino Funes Arias (1853–1910)
- Gálvez, Santa Fe and Villa Gobernador Gálvez - José Gálvez, Governor of Santa Fe
- Gobernador Candioti - Francisco Candioti (1743-1815), first governor of Santa Fe
- Granadero Baigorria - Juan Bautista Baigorria
- Humberto Primo - Umberto I of Italy
- Humboldt, Argentina - Alexander von Humboldt
- Jacinto L. Arauz - Jacinto L. Arauz, landowner
- Josefina, Santa Fe - Josefina Rodríguez del Fresno (1795-1849), wife of a founder
- Llambi Campbell - Paulino Llambi Campbell, founder
- Marcelino Escalada (Santa Fe) - Marcelino Escalada, founder
- Moussy (Santa Fe) - Martin de Moussy (1810-1869), French naturalist
- Murphy, Santa Fe - John James Murphy (1822-1909)
- Nicanor Molinas (Santa Fe) - Nicanor Molinas
- Pedro Gómez Cello (Santa Fe) - Pedro Gómez Cello (1887-1947), Governor of Santa Fe
- Presidente Roca (Santa Fe) - Julio Argentino Roca
- Pueblo Muñoz - Camila Pedemonte de Muñoz, founder
- Rafaela, Santa Fe Province – Rafaela Rodríguez de Egusquiza
- Roldán, Santa Fe - Felipe M. de Roldán, provincial deputy
- Romang, Santa Fe - Dr. Theophilus Romang
- Rivadavia, Santa Fe - Bernardino Rivadavia
- Sa Pereira - Domingo de Sa Pereira
- Saladero Mariano Cabal - Mariano Cabal
- Sanford - Henry Dunant Sanford, British engineer
- Sargento Cabral (Santa Fe) - Juan Bautista Cabral
- Serodino - Pedro Alejo Serodino, founder
- Theobald, Argentina - Wilson Theobald, shareholder of the English railway board
- Vera, Santa Fe - Mariano Vera
- Vera y Pintado - Bernardo de Vera y Pintado
- Vicente Echeverría - Vicente Anastasio Echevarría
- Villa Cañás - Juan Cañás, founder
- Villa Minetti - Domingo Minetti (1901-1975)
- Villa Saralegui - Antonio de Saralegui y Zarandona (1847-1907)
- Wildermuth - Federico Wildermuth (1848-1895)
- Zenón Pereyra - Zenón Pereyra (1842-1902), founder

==== Santiago del Estero ====
- Aguirre Department - Francisco de Aguirre (conquistador)
- Alberdi Department - Juan Bautista Alberdi
- Avellaneda Department, Santiago del Estero - Nicolás Avellaneda
- Belgrano Department, Santiago del Estero - Manuel Belgrano
- Campo Gallo - Juan Camilo Gallo, early settler
- Fernández, Santiago del Estero - Jesús María Fernández, founder
- Frías, Santiago del Estero - Felix Frias (1814-1883)
- General Taboada Department - General Antonino Taboada (1810-1883)
- Hasse (Santiago del Estero) - Julius Hasse, railway sleeper dealer
- Ingeniero Forres - Archibald Williamson, 1st Baron Forres, director of the Central Argentine Railway Company
- Jiménez Department - Manuel Jiménez, military mayor
- Juan Felipe Ibarra Department - Juan Felipe Ibarra
- Mitre Department - Bartolomé Mitre
- Moreno Department - Mariano Moreno
- Pellegrini Department - Carlos Pellegrini
- Tomás Young (Santiago del Estero) - Tomás Young, railway engineer
- Villa Figueroa - Juan de Paz y Figueroa
- Weisburd - Israel Weisburd (1864-1952), businessman

==== Tierra del Fuego, Antartida e Islas del Atlantico Sur ====
- Puerto Cook - James Cook, British Royal Navy officer
- San Sebastián, Tierra del Fuego - Saint Sebastian

==== Tucuman ====
- Capitán Cáceres - Captain Héctor Cáceres (1947-1975), first officer of the Argentine Army to fall in combat during Operation Independence in Tucumán
- Delfín Gallo, Tucumán - Delfín Gallo
- Gobernador Garmendia - Pedro de Garmendia
- Juan Bautista Alberdi, Tucumán - Juan Bautista Alberdi
- Manuel García Fernández - Manuel García Fernández (d.1923), founder of Bella Vista Sugar Mill
- San Isidro de Lules - Isidore the Laborer
- San Miguel de Tucumán - Saint Michael
- San Pedro de Colalao - Saint Peter
- Santa Ana, Tucumán - Saint Anne
- Santa Lucía, Tucumán - Saint Lucy
- Santa Rosa de Leales - Rose of Lima
- Sargento Moya - Sargent Moya, fallen soldier
- Soldado Maldonado - Ismael Maldonado (d.1975), fallen soldier during Operation Independence in Tucumán
- Teniente Berdina - Second Lieutenant Rodolfo Hernán Berdina (1952-1975), fallen soldier
- Villa Nougués - Luis Nougués (1871-1915), Governor of Tucuman
- Villa Quinteros - Lidoro Quinteros (1848-1907), Governor of Tucuman

==== Former ====
- Cabo Mayor Fariña Department - Miguel Ángel Fariña (1925-1951), Peronist non-commissioned officer who died during an uprising; now Mayor Luis Jorge Fontana Department
- Ciudad Eva Perón (means Eva Perón City) – Eva Perón, First Lady of Argentina; now La Plata
- Eva Perón Department (Catamarca) – Eva Perón; now El Alto Department
- Eva Perón Department (Chaco) – Eva Perón; now Quitilipi Department
- Eva Perón Department (Córdoba) – Eva Perón; now Pocho Department
- Eva Perón Department (Corrientes) – Eva Perón; now Monte Caseros Department
- Eva Perón Department (La Rioja) – Eva Perón; now Chilecito Department
- Eva Perón Department (Salta) – Eva Perón; now La Viña Department
- Eva Perón Department (San Juan) – Eva Perón; now Caucete Department
- Eva Perón Department (San Luis) – Eva Perón; now Juan Martín de Pueyrredón Department
- Eva Perón Department (Santa Fe) – Eva Perón; now San Justo Department, Santa Fe
- Gobernador Gordillo Department (La Rioja) - Pedro Antonio Gordillo (1821-1915); now Chamical Department
- Pelagio B. Luna Department (La Rioja) – Pelagio Luna, Vice President; now San Blas de los Sauces Department
- Presidente Juan Domingo Perón (Corrientes) - Juan Domingo Perón; now General Alvear Department, Corrientes
- Presidente Perón (San Juan) - Juan Domingo Perón; now Pocito Department
- Presidente Perón (San Luis) - Juan Domingo Perón; now Gobernador Dupuy Department
- Presidente Tte. General Perón Department (Mendoza) - Juan Domingo Perón; now Malargüe Department
- Sarmiento Department (La Rioja) – Domingo Faustino Sarmiento; now Vinchina Department

=== Armenia ===
- Abovyan and Abovyan, Ararat – Khachatur Abovyan, writer
- Anushavan – Dr. Anushavan Galoyan (1901–1945), World War II hero
- Artashat (Artaxata) – Artaxias I, Armenian king
- Ashotavan - Colonel Ashot Sargsyan (1903-1941), World War II hero
- Baghramyan, Ararat, Baghramyan, Armavir and Baghramyan, Echmiadzin – Hovhannes Bagramyan, Armenian marshal and military commander
- Bagratashen – Bagrat Vardanian (1894–1971), hero of Socialist Labor
- Beniamin – Beniamin Galstian (1902–1942), World War II general
- Charentsavan – Yeghishe Charents, poet
- Chkalov, Armenia and Chkalovka – Valery Chkalov, Russian pilot
- David Bek, Armenia – Davit Bek, Armenian patriot
- Dimitrov, Armenia – Georgi Dimitrov, Bulgarian Communist leader
- Ferik – Ferik Polatbekov (1897–1918), revolutionary and poet
- Fioletovo – Ivan Fioletov, socialist martyr and Baku Commissar
- Gagarin, Armenia – Yuri Gagarin, Russian cosmonaut
- Gay, Armenia - Gaia Gai, Persian-Armenian military commander
- Gharibjanian – Bagrat Gharibjanian (1890–1920), Bolshevik martyr
- Ghukasavan – Ghukas Ghukasian (1899–1920), founder of Armenia's Communist Youth Movement
- Griboyedov, Armenia – Alexandr Griboyedov, Russian diplomat and author
- Gusanagyugh – "Gusan" (given name: Nakhshikar Sargis), bard
- Imeni Kirova, Armenia – Sergey Kirov, Bolshevik leader
- Imeni Tairova – Alexander Tairov, Armenian theater director
- Isahakyan – Avetik Isahakyan, poet
- Kamo, Armenia – Kamo (Bolshevik) (1882–1922), nom de guerre of Simon Ter-Petrossian
- Khanjian, Armenia – Aghasi Khanjian, first secretary of the Armenian Communist Party
- Kuchak – Nahapet Kuchak, 16th-century bard
- Lermontovo – Mikhail Lermontov, Russian writer and poet
- Lukashin and Lukashin, Yerevan – Sargis Lukashin, Armenian prime minister
- Martiros, Vayots Dzor – Martiros the Priest, Armenian cleric, scribe, and architect who founded the village in 1283
- Martuni, Armenia, Martuni (village) and Myasnikyan – Aleksandr Myasnikyan, first Communist president of Armenia, whose nom de guerre was "Martuni"
- Mayakovski, Armenia – Vladimir Mayakovsky, Russian poet
- Mergelyan (Yerevan) – Sergey Mergelyan, Armenian scientist
- Mikhaylovka, Armenia – Timofei Mikhailov, Russian revolutionary and regicide
- Mkhchyan – Liparit Mkchyan, an Armenian commander killed in 1921
- Monteavan - Monte Melkonian
- Musayelyan, Ashotsk – Capt. Sargis Musayelian (1882–1920), Bolshevik military leader
- Nagapetavan – Nahapet Kurghinian (1900–1937), participant in the Bolshevik uprising in May 1920
- Nalbandyan, Armenia – Mikael Nalbandian, writer
- Narek, Ararat – Grigor Narekatsi, medieval monk and poet
- Nizami, Armenia – Nizami Ganjevi, Persian poet
- Nzhdeh, Armenia - Garegin Nzhdeh
- Paruyr Sevak, Armenia – Paruyr Sevak, poet
- Proshyan - Perch Proshian, writer
- Pushkino, Armenia – Alexander Pushkin, Russian author and poet
- Sarukhan – Hovhannes Sarukhanian (1882–1920), Communist revolutionary
- Sayat-Nova, Armenia – Harutyun Sayatyan, poet
- Shahumyan, Ararat, Shahumyan, Armavir, Shahumyan, Lori, Shahumyan, Yerevan and Stepanavan – Stepan Shahumyan, Bolshevik commissar
- Shamiram, Armenia - Semiramis, Assyrian legendary queen
- Spandaryan, Shirak, Spandaryan, Syunik and Surenavan – Suren Spandaryan, Armenian revolutionary
- Sverdlov, Armenia – Yakov Sverdlov, Bolshevik leader
- Tatul, Armenia - Tatul Krpeyan
- Tumanyan, Armenia – Hovhannes Tumanyan, writer
- Vazgenashen (Aragatsotn) - Vazgen Sargsyan
- Yenokavan – Enok Mkrtumian (1896–1920), early Communist
- Zhdanov, Lori – Andrei Zhdanov

Former:

- Akhundov was the name of Punik – Mirza Fatali Akhundov, author
- Azizbekov was the name of Aregnadem – Meshadi Azizbekov, Soviet revolutionary
- Azizbekov was the name of Vayk – Meshadi Azizbekov
- Azizbekov was the name of Zarritap – Meshadi Azizbekov
- Batikian was the name of Gandzak, Armenia – Batik Batikian (1892–1920), Communist martyr
- Danushavan was the name of Aygehat – Danush Shahverdyan, Armenian Bolshevik revolutionary and Soviet statesman
- Ghukasyan was the name of Ashotsk – Ghukas Ghukasian (1899–1920), founder of Armenia's Communist Youth Movement
- Imeni Beriya was the name of Shahumyan, Ararat – Lavrentiy Beria, Soviet politician and head of the secret police
- Imeni Beriya was the name of Zhdanov, Armavir – Lavrentiy Beria
- Imeni Stalina was the name of Sovkhoz Nomer Shest – Joseph Stalin
- Imeni Voroshilova was the name of Hatsik, Armavir – Kliment Voroshilov, Marshal of the Soviet Union
- Kalinin was the name of Noramarg – Mikhail Kalinin, Soviet leader
- Kalinino was the name of Tashir – Mikhail Kalinin
- Kamo was the name of Gavar – Kamo (Bolshevik) (1882–1922), nom de guerre of Simon Ter-Petrossian
- Kirov was the name of Amrakits – Sergey Kirov, early Bolshevik leader
- Kirov was the name of Taperakan – Sergey Kirov
- Kirovakan was the name of Vanadzor – Sergey Kirov
- Kirovka was the name of Mamai, Armenia – Sergey Kirov
- Kuybyshev was the name of Haghartsin, Armenia – Valerian Kuybyshev, Soviet leader
- Maksim Gorkiy was the name of Bovadzor – Maxim Gorky, Soviet author
- Mikoyan was the name of Yeghegnadzor – Anastas Mikoyan, Soviet leader
- Mravyan was the name of Yeghipatrush – Askanaz Mravyan, leader of Soviet Armenia
- Ordzhonikidze was the name of Vahan, Armenia – Sergo Ordzhonikidze, Soviet leader
- Samed Vurgun was the name of Hovk – Samad Vurgun, Soviet poet
- Shavarshavan was the name of Koti, Armenia – Shavarsh Amirkhanian (1984-1959), leader of the precursor to the Armenian KGB
- Spandaryan was the name of Silikyan – Suren Spandaryan, Armenian revolutionary
- Tumanyan was the name of Dsegh – Hovhannes Tumanyan, writer
- Vagharshapat was the name of Echmiadzin – King Vologases I (Vagharsh I)
- Vorontsovka was the name of Tashir – Prince Mikhail Semyonovich Vorontsov, viceroy of the Caucasus

=== Austria ===
- Amaliendorf-Aalfang – Maria Amalia, Duchess of Parma
- Arnoldstein – Austrian knight and founder named Arnold
- Bartholomäberg - Bartholomew the Apostle
- Elisabeth-Vorstadt (Salzburg) – Empress Elisabeth of Austria
- Felixdorf – Felix Mießl (1778–1861), Mayor of Wiener Neustadt
- Hermagor-Pressegger See - Hermagoras of Aquileia
- Hugo Breitner Hof (Vienna) – Hugo Breitner (1873–1946), Social Democrat politician
- Jakomini – Kaspar Andreas von Jacomini (1726–1805)
- Josefstadt – Joseph I, Holy Roman Emperor
- Josef-Rautmann-Hof (Vienna) – Josef Rautmann (1890–1970)
- Leopoldskron-Moos (Salzburg) – Leopold Anton von Firmian (1679–1744), Archbishop of Salzburg
- Leopoldstadt – Leopold I Holy Roman Emperor
- Paternion - Paternian
- Per-Albin-Hansson-Siedlung (Wien) – Per Albin Hansson, Swedish politician
- Rudolfsheim-Fünfhaus – Crown Prince Rudolf of Austria
- St Anton am Arlberg - Anthony of Padua
- St. Pölten – The name Sankt Pölten is derived from Hippolytus of Rome. The city was renamed to Sankt Hippolyt, then Sankt Polyt and finally Sankt Pölten.
- Sankt Gerold - Saint Gerold of Saxony (c. 900–978)
- Sankt Jakob in Defereggen - James the Great
- Sankt Leonhard im Pitztal - Leonard of Noblac
- Sankt Margarethen im Burgenland - Margaret of Hungary (saint)
- Sankt Martin an der Raab - Martin of Tours
- Sankt Michael im Burgenland - Saint Michael
- Sankt Oswald bei Haslach - Oswald of Northumbria
- Sankt Sigmund im Sellrain - Sigismund of Burgundy
- Sankt Ulrich am Pillersee - Ulrich of Augsburg
- Sankt Wolfgang-Kienberg – Wolfgang of Regensburg
- Theresienfeld – Maria Theresa
- Ulrichsberg - Ulrich I, a long-time chairman of Schlägl Abbey
- Wilhelmsburg, Austria – William, Duke of Austria
- Wilhelmsdorf (Wien) – Father Wilhelm Sedlaczek (1793–1848)

=== Azerbaijan ===
- Ənvər Məmmədxanlı, Azerbaijan – Ənvər Məmmədxanlı, writer
- Babek – Babak Khorramdin, Persian revolutionary
- Bakıxanov – Abbasgulu Bakikhanov, writer
- Cəlilabad (also spelled Jalilabad) – Jalil Mammadguluzadeh
- Fətəli xan – Fatali Khan Khoyski, Azerbaijani prime minister
- Firuzabad, Azerbaijan – Firuz Məlikov (1902–1965), Azerbaijani scientist
- Fizuli Rayon, Füzuli, Füzuli, Samukh, and Füzuli, Shamkir – Fuzûlî, Turkic poet
- Hacı Zeynalabdin – Haji Zeynalabdin Taghiyev, industrialist and philanthropist
- Hacıbəyov (Goranboy) - Uzeyir Hajibeyov, composer
- Həzi Aslanov – Azi Aslanov, Azerbaijani general
- Heydarabad, Azerbaijan, Heydərabad – Heydar Aliyev, President of Azerbaijan
- Kuropatkino – Aleksey Kuropatkin, Russian general
- Mahsati (Ganja) - Mahsati, Medieval Persian poet
- Mehdiabad, Azerbaijan - Mehdi Huseynzade (1918-1944), World War II Hero
- Məmmədbəyli - Məhəmməd bəy Aşiq Zəngilani (1800-1861), poet
- Mircəlal – Mir Jalal Pashayev, Azerbaijani writer
- Nərimanov raion, Nərimankənd, Bilasuvar, Nərimankənd, Gobustan, Nərimanabad, Lankaran and Nərimanov – Nariman Narimanov, Prime Minister of Soviet Azerbaijan
- Nəsimi raion, Nəsimi, Bilasuvar, Nəsimi, Sabirabad and Nəsimikənd – Imadaddin Nasimi
- Nadirkənd – Nadir Karimov (d.1943)
- Nizami, Goranboy and Nizami raion – Nizami Ganjevi, Persian poet
- Pirvahid - Aliagha Vahid, poet
- Qaçaq Kərəm – Qaçaq Kərəm (1860–1909), Azeri national hero
- Rəsulzadə – Mammed Amin Rasulzade, Azeri statesman and First President of the Democratic Republic of Azerbaijan
- Sabirabad (city) and Sabirabad Rayon – poet Mirza Alakbar Sabir
- Salatın – Salatyn Asgarova, Azerbaijani journalist
- Səməd Vurğun, Azerbaijan and Vurğun – Samad Vurgun, Azerbaijani writer
- Səmədabad, Yevlakh – Samedaga Agamali oglu (1867–1930)
- Shaumyan, Dashkasan – Stepan Shahumyan, Bolshevik commissar
- Şəhriyar, Goygol – Mohammad-Hossein Shahriar, Iranian Azerbaijani poet
- Xətai, Nakhchivan – Ismail I of Persia
- Yusif Məmmədəliyev (village) – Yusif Mammadaliyev (1905–1961), President of the National Academy of Sciences of Azerbaijan

Alternate:

- Martuni is the name given by the Nagorno Karabakh Republic to Khojavend (city) – Aleksandr Myasnikyan, first Communist president of Armenia, whose nom de guerre was "Martuni"

Former:

- Ali Bayramli was the name of Shirvan – Ali Bayramov, early Bolshevik
- Azizbekovo was the name of Basqal – Meshadi Azizbekov, Soviet revolutionary
- Elizavetpol was the name of Ganja – Czarina Elizabeth Alexeievna (Louise of Baden)
- Frunze was the name of Hacırüstəmli – Mikhail Frunze, Bolshevik leader
- Il'ichëvsk and Ilich were names of Şərur – Vladimir Ilich Lenin
- Imeni Kirova was the name of Bankə – Sergey Kirov
- Imeni Kirova and Kirova were names of Yeni Suraxanı – Sergey Kirov
- Kaganovich was the name of Qaraçuxur – Lazar Kaganovich, Soviet politician
- Kalinin was the name of Burunqovaq – Mikhail Kalinin, Soviet leader
- Kalininkend was the name of Vurğun – Mikhail Kalinin
- Kirovabad was the name of Ganja – Sergey Kirov
- Kirovkənd and Kirovka were names of Həsənsu – Sergey Kirov
- Kirovka was the name of Nağaraxana – Sergey Kirov
- Kirovkənd was the name of Ənvər Məmmədxanlı, Azerbaijan – Sergey Kirov
- Kuybyshev was the name of Ölcələr – Valerian Kuybyshev, Soviet revolutionary
- Lenin, Leninkend, and Leninfeld were names of Çinarlı, Shamkir – Lenin
- Leninabad was the name of Sanqalan – Lenin
- Leninabad was the name of Təklə, Gobustan – Lenin
- Leninavan was the name of Həsənqaya, Tartar – Lenin
- Leninkend was the name of Mustafabəyli – Lenin
- Molotov was the name of Oktyabrkənd – Vyacheslav Molotov, Soviet politician
- Musabekov was the name of Zəhmətkənd – Gazanfar Musabekov, Soviet politician
- Myasnikovabad was the name of Əliabad, Nakhchivan – Gavril Myasnikov, Bolshevik revolutionary
- Narimankend was the name of Qoşakənd – Nariman Narimanov, revolutionary
- Orconikidze was the name of Nərimankənd, Gadabay – Sergo Ordzhonikidze
- Pamyat' Lenina was the name of Balıqçılar – Lenin
- Perozabad was the name of Barda, Azerbaijan – Peroz I
- Port-İliç was the name of Liman, Azerbaijan – Vladimir Ilyich Lenin
- Pushkino was the name of Biləsuvar – Alexander Pushkin
- Rəsulzadə was the name of Yeni Suraxanı – Mammed Amin Rasulzade, Azeri statesman
- Shahumyan was the name of Aşağı Ağcakənd – Stepan Shahumyan, Bolshevik commissar
- Shaumyan-Akhtachi was the name of Axtaçı, Sabirabad – Stepan Shahumyan
- Stalin was the name of Sabail raion – Joseph Stalin
- Stalino was the name of Çaylı, Tartar – Joseph Stalin
- V.İ.Lenin was the name of Böyük Kəsik – Lenin
- Voroshilovka was the name of Aşıqlı – Kliment Voroshilov, Marshal of the Soviet Union
- Yelizavetpol was the name of Ganja – Czarina Elizabeth Alexeievna (Louise of Baden)
- Zhdanov was the name of Beylagan – Andrei Zhdanov

=== Bahamas ===
- Abraham's Bay - Abraham Alexander Charlton, founder
- Alice Town - Princess Alice of the United Kingdom
- Arthur's Town - Prince Arthur, Duke of Connaught and Strathearn
- Clarence Town - named for Maj. Archibald William George Taylor´s brother
- Cockburn Town, Bahamas - Francis Cockburn
- Colonel Hill - Colonel Andrew Deveaux
- Dunmore Town - John Murray, 4th Earl of Dunmore
- George Town, Bahamas – George III of Great Britain
- Matthew Town – George Buckley-Mathew, Bahamian governor in 1844–1849
- Nassau, Bahamas – William III of England
- Nicholls Town – Edward Nicolls

=== Bahrain ===
- Hamad Town – Hamad ibn Isa Al Khalifah
- Isa Town – Isa ibn Salman Al Khalifah

=== Bangladesh ===
- Cox's Bazar – Captain Hiram Cox
- Faridpur District – Sufi saint Shah Fariduddin Masud, follower of the Chishti order of Ajmer
- Hamidpur Union - Hamidur Rahman
- Kamalnagar Upazila – Ziaur Rahman´s nickname "Kamal"
- Madaripur District – Sufi saint 'Sayed Badiuddin Zinda Shah Madar
- Mostafapur Union – Sufi saint Shah Mustafa
- Moulvibazar, Moulvibazar Sadar, Moulvibazar District – Syed Moulvi Qudratullah Munsef, Muslim cleric and judge
- Mujibnagar – Sheikh Mujibur Rahman, President of Bangladesh
- Nesarabad Upazila – Nesaruddin Ahmad
- Noor Mohammad Nagar (Narail) - Bir Shrestha Nur Mohammad (1936-1971), Bengali national hero
- Osmani Nagar Upazila – General M.A.G Osmani
- Pirojpur District – Firoz Shah
- Rajshahi District – the Puthia Raj family
- Salamnagar (Feni) - Abdus Salam (activist)
- Shariatpur District – Haji Shariatullah, eminent Islamic reformer of the Indian subcontinent in British India
- Sher-e-Bangla Nagar – A. K. Fazlul Huq, Bengali lawyer, legislator and statesman
- Sherpur District – Sher Ali Gazi, the last jaghirdar of the Gazi dynasty

=== Barbados ===
- Hastings, Barbados – Warren Hastings
- Speightstown – William Speight (legislator)

=== Belarus ===
- Barysaw – Boris-Rogvolod Vseslavich
- Braslaw – Bryachislav of Polotsk
- Budenovka (Minsk) – Semyon Budyonny
- Davyd-Haradok – Prince David Igorevich
- Dzyarzhynsk – Felix Dzerzhinsky
- Gusarovka (Gomel) – Nikolai Gusarov
- Izabelin – Izabela Czartoryska, daughter of founder
- Kirawsk – Sergey Kirov
- Leninski – Vladimir Lenin

=== Belize ===
- Albert (Belize House constituency) – Prince Albert Victor, Duke of Clarence and Avondale
- Douglas, Belize – Douglas Wilson (bishop)
- Flowers Bank – William Flowers (d.1786)
- Fort George (Belize House constituency) – George III of the United Kingdom
- Georgeville, Belize – George Cadle Price
- Hopkins – Frederick Charles Hopkins
- Victoria Peak (Belize) – Queen Victoria

=== Benin ===
- Banikoara - Bani Gansé, founder
- Malanville – Henri Malan (1869–1912), French Governor of Dahomey

=== Bermuda ===
- Hamilton – Henry Hamilton

=== Bhutan ===
- Gyalpozhing - Jigme Dorji Wangchuck
- Jigme Dorji – King Jigme Dorji Wangchuck
- Wangdue Phodrang – Wangdi, boy playing in a river

=== Bolivia ===
- Abel Iturralde Province – Abel Iturralde Palacios (1869–1935), Bolivian politician
- Alonso de Ibáñez Province – José Alonso de Ibáñez, resistance hero from Potosí
- Andrés Ibáñez Province – Andrés Ibáñez (1844–1877), leader of the federal revolution in Santa Cruz
- Ángel Sandoval Province – Angel Sandoval Peña (1871–1941)
- Aniceto Arce Province – Aniceto Arce Ruiz, President of Bolivia
- Antonio Quijarro Province – Antonio Quijarro Quevedo (1831–1903), Bolivian politician
- Azurduy Province – Juana Azurduy de Padilla, revolutionary guerrilla
- Bautista Saavedra Province – Bautista Saavedra Mallea, President of Bolivia
- Belisario Boeto Province – Belisario Boeto (1841–1900), Bolivian diplomat during a War of the Pacific
- Bernardino Bilbao Province – General Bernardino Bilbao Rioja (1895–1983), Bolivian military figure and politician
- Bolívar Province, Cochabamba – Simón Bolívar, Venezuelan military and political leader
- Burdett O'Connor Province – Francisco Burdett O'Connor, chronicler of the South American War of Independence and the making of Tarija
- Carlos Medinaceli (Potosí) – Carlos Medinaceli Lizarazu (1789–1841), Bolivian military
- Carrasco Province – Jose Carrasco Torrico (1863–1921), Vice president of Bolivia
- Cornelio Saavedra Province – Cornelio Saavedra, president of the Argentine First Junta
- Daniel Campos Province – Daniel Campos Cortes (1829–1902), Bolivian poet
- Eduardo Abaroa Province – Colonel Eduardo Abaroa, hero of the War of the Pacific
- El Carmen Rivero Tórrez (Santa Cruz) – Juan Rivero Tórres (1897–1951), a Bolivian engineer
- Eliodoro Camacho Province – Eliodoro Camacho, Bolivian politician, party leader, and presidential candidate
- Enrique Baldivieso Province – Enrique Baldivieso, Vice president of Bolivia under German Busch
- Esteban Arce Province – General Esteban Arce (1765–1815), Bolivian independence hero
- Eustaquio Méndez Province – Eustaquio Méndez Arenas (1784–1841), warrior leader of Tarija
- Franz Tamayo Province – Franz Tamayo, Bolivian intellectual, writer and politician
- Federico Román Province – General Federico Roman Calderon (1875–1943), Hero of the Chaco War
- Germán Busch Province – Germán Busch Becerra, former Bolivian military officer, hero of the Chaco War, and President of Bolivia
- Germán Jordán Province – Germán Jordán (1890–1932), a hero of the Chaco War
- Gualberto Villarroel Province – Gualberto Villarroel, President of Bolivia, who was killed in 1946 under his presidency
- Hernando Siles Province – Hernando Siles Reyes, President of Bolivia
- José Ballivián Province – José Ballivián, President of Bolivia
- José Manuel Pando Province – José Manuel Pando (1848–1917) president of Bolivia
- José María Avilés Province – General José María Avilés (1784–1838), a hero who was fighting during the Peru–Bolivian Confederation campaign
- José María Linares Province – José María Linares, President of Bolivia
- Ladislao Cabrera Province – Ladislao Cabrera, Bolivian hero during the War of the Pacific
- Loayza Province – Jose Ramon Loayza (1751–1839), President of Bolivia
- Luis Calvo – Luis Calvo Calvimontes (1879–1944), Bolivian lawyer and senator
- Manco Kapac Province – Manco Cápac
- Manuel María Caballero Province – Manuel María Caballero (1819–1865), one of the signatories of the Bolivian constitution of 5 August 1861
- Marcelo Quiroga Santa Cruz (Cochabamba) – Marcelo Quiroga Santa Cruz
- Maximiliano Paredes (Cochabamba) – Maximiliano Paredes (1879–1900), Bolivian soldier
- Modesto Omiste Province – Modesto Omiste Tinajeros, Bolivian writer and politician
- Monseñor Salvatierra (Santa Cruz) – José Andrés de Salvatierra (1772–1862), Bolivian priest and independence hero
- Monteagudo, Bolivia – Bernardo de Monteagudo
- Muñecas Province – Idelfonso de las Muñecas (1776–1816), priest and leader of the War of Independence
- Narciso Campero Province – Narciso Campero, President of Bolivia
- Nicolás Suárez Province – Nicolás Suárez Callaú
- Ñuflo de Chávez Province – conquistador Ñuflo de Chaves
- Obispo Santistevan Province – Monseñor José Belisario Santistevan Seoane (1843–1931)
- Oropeza Province – Samuel Oropeza (d.1907), an illustrious Bolivian statesman
- Padilla, Bolivia – Manuel Ascencio Padilla, an Upper Peruvian guerrilla chief
- Paz Estenssoro Viejo (Santa Cruz) – Victor Paz Estenssoro, President of Bolivia
- Puerto Siles – Hernando Siles Reyes
- Puerto Villarroel – Gualberto Villarroel, President of Bolivia
- Rafael Bustillo Province – Rafael Bustillo (1813–1873), Bolivian diplomat and foreign secretary
- Ramón Darío Gutiérrez (Itenez, Beni) – Ramón Darío Gutiérrez (1907–1987), minister of the interior
- Rufino Carrasco (Potosí) – Rufino Carrasco (1817–1891), Bolivian military during the war of the pacific
- San Ignacio de Velasco – José Miguel de Velasco Franco, President of Bolivia
- Sebastián Pagador Province – Sebastián Pagador Miranda (1733–1781), patriot of Upper Peru
- Sucre – Antonio José de Sucre
- Tarija – Tariq ibn Ziyad
- Teniente Bullaín (Oruro) – José Bullaín (1907–1934), Hero of the Chaco war
- Tomas Barrón Province – Colonel Tomas Barrón (d.1810), an Independence hero
- Tomás Frías Province – Tomás Frías Ametller, President of Bolivia
- Tupac Katari, Santa Cruz – Tupac Katari
- Uriondo – Francisco Uriondo (1784–1822)
- Urriolagoitia, Chuquisaca – Mamerto Urriolagoitía
- Vaca Díez Province – Antonio Vaca Diez (1840–1897)
- Villa Abecia – Valentin Abecia (1846–1910)
- Villa Banzer, Beni – Hugo Banzer
- Villa Barrientos (La Paz) – René Barrientos
- Villa Vaca Guzmán – Santiago Vaca Guzmán (1847–1896)
- Villamontes – Ismael Montes, President of Bolivia
- Villazón – Eliodoro Villazón
- Waldo Ballivián Municipality – Waldo Ballivián Soria-Galvarro (1917–1946)
- Warnes, Bolivia – Ignacio Warnes, military leader in the South American war of independence
- Zudáñez – Jaime de Zudáñez

=== Bosnia and Herzegovina ===
- Andrićgrad - Ivo Andrić
- Mrkonjić Grad – King Peter I of Serbia who had taken the nom de guerre "Mrkonjić" while fighting against the Ottoman Empire
- Šuškovo Naselje - Gojko Šušak
- Tomislavgrad – King Tomislav of Croatia or Prince Tomislav of Yugoslavia

=== Botswana ===
- Francistown – Daniel Francis (1840–1920), English prospector
- Gaborone – Chief Gaborone
- Moremi, Botswana - Morêmi II a Letsholathêbê (1895-1960), 19th-century Batawana
- Nswazwi - John Nswazwi

=== Brazil ===
For a longer list, please see List of places in Brazil named after people.

- Salvador, Brazil – Jesus (the Christian Savior)
- São Luís, Maranhão, Brazil – Louis IX of France (Saint Louis)
- São Paulo – Saint Paul

=== Brunei ===
- Bandar Seri Begawan – Omar Ali Saifuddien III
- Kampong Sultan Lama - Sultan Hashim Jalilul Alam Aqamaddin

=== Bulgaria ===
- Anton, Sofia Province – partisan Stefan Minev "Anton" (1917–1944)
- Antonovo – Anton Krastev, who died in a battle of 1944
- Asenovgrad – Tsar Ivan Asen II
- Aksakovo – Russian littérateur Ivan Aksakov
- Benkovski, Kardzhali Province – revolutionary Georgi Benkovski
- Blagoevgrad – Bulgarian Workers' Social Democratic Party founder Dimitar Blagoev
- Botevgrad – Revolutionary and National Hero Hristo Botev
- Bratya Daskalovi – The Daskalovi brothers Dimitar, Ivan and Nikola
- Chervenkovtsi (Veliko Tarnovo) – Valko Chervenkov, Prime Minister of Bulgaria
- Dimitrovgrad – Communist leader and Prime Minister Georgi Dimitrov
- Dimovo – partisan Zhivko (Dimo) Puev (1903–1943)
- Dobrich – 14th-century Dobrujan ruler Dobrotitsa
- Dospat – Despot Alexius Slav
- Dulovo, Bulgaria – early medieval Bulgarian Dulo clan
- Elena, Bulgaria – Bulgarian bride Elena
- Elin Pelin – writer Elin Pelin
- Galabovo (Plovdiv) - Nikola Galabov (1882-1923), lawyer
- General Toshevo – General Stefan Toshev
- Georgi Damyanovo – Georgi Damyanov, President of Bulgaria in 1950 until 1958
- Georgi Dobrevo – Georgi Dobrev (1893–1966), Bulgarian political figure
- Gotse Delchev – revolutionary Gotse Delchev
- Gurkovo – Iosif Gurko, one of Russian commanders in Russo-Turkish War (1877–1878)
- Hadzhidimovo – leftist Internal Macedonian Revolutionary Organization (IMRO) revolutionary Dimo Hadzhidimov
- Isperih – Khan Asparuh of Bulgaria
- Ivaylovgrad – Tsar Ivaylo of Bulgaria
- Kableshkovo (disambiguation) – revolutionary Todor Kableshkov
- Kapitan Andreevo – Bulgarian officer Nikola Kolev Andreev (1876–1912)
- Kapitan Petko voyvoda – Petko Voyvoda
- Krumovgrad – Khan Krum of Bulgaria
- Kubrat – Khan Kubrat of Bulgaria
- Kyustendil – 14th-century local feudal Constantine Dragaš
- Levski (town) – revolutionary and National Hero Vasil Levski
- Madzharovo – revolutionary Dimitar Madzharov (1882–1949)
- Momchilgrad – medieval Bulgarian ruler Momchil
- Nikola Kozlevo – Bulgarian National Revival revolutionary and writer Nikola Kozlev (1824–1902)
- Omurtag – Khan Omurtag of Bulgaria
- Pavel Banya – St. Pavel (Paul) and Grand Duke Paul Alexandrovich of Russia
- Polyanovo, Burgas Province and Polyanovo, Haskovo Province – Dimitar Polyanov (1878–1953), poet
- Radomir (town) – Gavril Radomir of Bulgaria
- Rakovski – revolutionary Georgi Sava Rakovski
- Roman, Bulgaria – Tsar Roman of Bulgaria
- Samuil (village) – Tsar Samuil of Bulgaria
- Sandanski – revolutionary Yane Sandanski
- Shumen – Bulgarian emperor Simeon the Great
- Simeonovgrad – Tsar Simeon I of Bulgaria
- St. Anastasia Island – Anastasia of Sirmium
- St. Ivan Island – St. John the Baptist
- Stamboliyski – Prime Minister of Bulgaria Aleksandar Stamboliyski
- Stambolovo, Haskovo Province – Prime Minister of Bulgaria Stefan Stambolov
- Stefan Karadzhovo – Bulgarian Revolutionary Stefan Karadzha
- Suvorovo – Alexander Suvorov, one of the famous Russian military commanders
- Tervel – Khan Tervel of Bulgaria
- Thompson – British officer William Frank Thompson
- Tsar Kaloyan – Tsar Kaloyan of Bulgaria
- Tsarevo – Tsar Boris III of Bulgaria
- Tsenovo, Ruse Province – Influential Svishtov merchant Dimitar Apostolov Tsenov (1852–1932)
- Velingrad – Bulgarian communist revolutionary Vela Peeva
- Yambol – Roman Emperor Diocletian
- Zhivkovo (Sofia) – Georgi Zhivkov (1844–1899), minister of education

Former:

- Borisovgrad was the name of Parvomay – Tsar Boris III of Bulgaria
- Grudovo was the name of Sredets – Todor Grudov (1895–1935)
- Kolarovgrad was the name of Shumen – Vasil Kolarov
- Stalin was the name of Varna – Joseph Stalin
- Stanke Dimitrov was the name of Dupnitsa – revolutionary Stanke Dimitrov
- Tolbukhin was the name of Dobrich – Soviet marshal Fyodor Tolbukhin

=== Burkina Faso ===
- Sankara, Burkina Faso – Thomas Sankara, Military, Revolutionary and President of Burkina Faso
- Ouagadougou - Wubri, an iconic Yonyonse warrior and leader
- Oubri Region - Moro Naba Oubri, the historic, foundational king of the Mossi Empire

=== Burundi ===
- Commune of Butaganzwa - Mwami Mutaga IV Mbikije (1892–1915)
- Gishora - Mwami Mwezi Gisabo (1840–1908)

=== Cambodia ===
- Phnom Penh – said to be named for Lady Penh
- Sihanoukville (city) – King Norodom Sihanouk

=== Cameroon ===
- Bertoua - King Mbartoua (d.1903), Gbaya leader who resisted German colonial forces
- Fontem - Fontem Asonganyi (1870-1951), Fon of the Bangwa kingdom of Lebang
- Lolodorf - Loulé Koutang, a prominent local chief and notable of the Kwassio/Bikoui people
- Nachtigal (Ntui) - Gustav Nachtigal

=== Canada ===
==== Alberta ====
- Alberta – Princess Louise Caroline Alberta
- Beazer, Alberta - Mark Beazer (1854–1937), first postmaster and locality's first bishop for congregants of the LDS Church
- Beiseker – Thomas Lincoln Beiseker (1866–1941), vice president of the Calgary Colonization Company
- Benton, Alberta - Thomas Hart Benton
- Bindloss - Harold Edward Bindloss
- Boyle, Alberta – John Robert Boyle
- Brooks, Alberta – Noel Edgell Brooks (1865–1926), Canadian Pacific Railway Divisional railway engineer
- Brownfield, Alberta – Charles D. Brownfield, the first postmaster from Missouri
- Brownvale – John Brown, homesteader
- Bruce, Alberta – Alexander Bruce Smith, manager of the Grand Trunk Pacific Telegraph Company
- Burdett, Alberta – Angela Burdett-Coutts, 1st Baroness Burdett-Coutts
- Cardston – Charles Ora Card, American mormon pioneer who was a founder of a town
- Caroline, Alberta – Caroline Rebecca Langley (1899-1981), daughter of Mr. and Mrs. Harvey Langley from Minnesota
- Cayley, Alberta - Hugh Cayley
- Cheadle, Alberta – Dr. Walter Butler Cheadle
- Cherhill, Alberta - A. P. Stetcher, postmaster
- Claresholm – Clare Niblock (1856–1942), a pioneer citizen
- Cochrane Lake, Alberta – Matthew Henry Cochrane
- Clyde, Alberta – George D. Clyde, a local entrepreneur and the community's first postmaster
- Daysland – Edgerton W. Day, mayor of Daysland
- De Winton, Alberta – Francis de Winton, British army officer
- DeBolt – Henry DeBolt, an early postmaster from Idaho and member of the Legislative Assembly of Alberta
- Dimsdale, Alberta - Henry George Wadsworth Dimsdale, a construction engineer from Edmonton, Dunvegan and British Columbia Railway company
- Donatville – Donat Gingras, a pioneer citizen
- Duffield, Alberta - George Duffield Hall, resident from Boston, Massachusetts
- Duhamel, Alberta – Joseph-Thomas Duhamel
- Edberg, Alberta – Johan Edstrom (1867-1949), an early postmaster from Sweden
- Edson, Alberta – Edson Joseph Chamberlin, American chief executive
- Ellscott – L.G. Scott, a purchasing agent for the Alberta and Great Waterways Railway
- Erskine, Alberta - Thomas Erskine, 1st Baron Erskine
- Esther, Alberta - Anna Esther Landreth (1899-1992), daughter of a postmaster
- Evansburg, Alberta – Harry Marshall Erskine Evans, former mayor of Edmonton
- Fabyan, Alberta - Robert Fabyan
- Faust, Alberta – E. T. Faust, a railroad officer
- Fort Fitzgerald - Francis Joseph Fitzgerald
- Fort McKay – Dr. Williams Morrison MacKay (1836-1917), the first president of the Northern Alberta Medical Association
- Fort McMurray – William McMurray (1820-1877), Chief Factor of Hudson's Bay Company
- Garfield, Alberta – James A. Garfield, 20th president of the United States
- Gunn, Alberta - Peter Gunn (politician)
- Gwynne, Alberta - Julia Maude Schreiber (née Gwynne) (1862-1937), president of the Ottawa Ladies' golf club
- Hardisty, Alberta – Richard Hardisty
- Heinsburg - John Heins, an early postmaster
- Herronton - John Herron (Alberta politician), member of the North-West Mounted Police
- Hoadley, Alberta - George Hoadley (Alberta politician)
- Holden, Alberta – James Bismark Holden
- Huxley, Alberta - Thomas Henry Huxley
- Iddesleigh, Alberta - Walter Northcote, 2nd Earl of Iddesleigh
- Irvine, Alberta - Colonel A. Irvine, a commissioner of the North-West Mounted Police
- Joffre, Alberta - Joseph Joffre
- Johnson's Addition - Aaron Johnson, assistant postmaster from Utah
- Kavanagh, Alberta - Charles Edmund Kavanagh (1880–1953), Canadian National Railway Company superintendent
- Kelsey, Alberta - Moses Kelsey (1847-1927), Mary Martha Fanset (1862-1944) and Earl Kelsey (1883-1979), founders from South Dakota
- Kimball, Alberta - Heber C. Kimball
- Kipp, Alberta - Joe Kipp (1849-1913), American whiskey trader
- Lacombe, Alberta – Albert Lacombe
- Lamont, Alberta – John Henderson Lamont
- Landry Heights - John "Dale" Armont Landry (1937-2008), purchaser
- Langdon, Alberta - Robert Bruce Langdon, Member of the Minnesota Senate and a contractor who helped build the Canadian Pacific Railway company
- Leavitt, Alberta - Thomas Rowell Leavitt
- Leduc, Alberta - Father Hippolyte Leduc (1842-1918)
- Lethbridge, Alberta – William Lethbridge
- Lindbergh, Alberta - Charles Lindbergh, American aviator
- Lloydminster – George Exton Lloyd
- Madden, Alberta - Bernard Madden, an early pioneer and a prominent rancher
- Magrath, Alberta – Charles Alexander Magrath
- Manning, Alberta – Ernest Manning, 8th Premier of Alberta
- Mayerthorpe – R. I. Mayer, the first postmaster
- McLennan, Alberta – John K. McLennan (1872–1953), vice president of the Edmonton, Dunvegan and British Columbia Railway
- Nobleford – Charles Sherwood Noble, American inventor
- Raymond, Alberta – Ray Knight (rodeo organizer)
- Patricia, Alberta – Princess Patricia
- Poe, Alberta - Edgar Allan Poe, American poet and writer
- Pollockville, Alberta - Robert Pollock, an early settler
- Reno, Alberta - Jesse L. Reno
- Robb, Alberta - Peter (Baldy) Addison Robb (1887–1954), Scottish freighter and prospector
- Schuler, Alberta - Norman Banks Schuler (1879-1950), first postmaster from Iowa
- Stettler, Alberta – Carl Stettler, Swiss postmaster
- Telfordville - Robert Telford, mayor of Leduc and postmaster
- Wainwright, Alberta – General William Wainwright, the second vice-president of Grand Trunk Pacific Railway company
- Walsh, Alberta - James Walsh, North-West Mounted Police officer
- Wardlow, Alberta - Catherine Wardlow Sutherland (1890-1955), daughter of rancher James R. Sutherland
- Warner, Alberta - A.L. Warner, land agent for the Alberta Railway and Irrigation Company
- Worsley, Alberta - Erick Worsley, a British Cavalry Officer and fur trader

==== British Columbia ====
- Abbotsford, British Columbia – Harry Abbott (1829–1915) (Canadian Pacific Railway superintendent)
- Agassiz, British Columbia - Lewis Nunn Agassiz (founder)
- Alexandria, British Columbia - Alexander Mackenzie (explorer)
- Barkerville, British Columbia – Billy Barker English prospector
- Bradner, Abbotsford – Thomas Bradner (1854-1919), settler
- Burnaby, British Columbia – Robert Burnaby
- Cawston, British Columbia – Richard Lowe Cawston (1849-1923), a pioneer rancher and magistrate
- Dallas, Kamloops – Dallas Johnston (1887–1964)
- Dewdney, British Columbia – Edgar Dewdney
- Donald, British Columbia – Donald Smith, 1st Baron Strathcona and Mount Royal
- Durieu, British Columbia – Pierre-Paul Durieu
- Ellison, British Columbia – Price Ellison (1852–1932), a stock raiser and wheat grower
- Erickson, British Columbia – Eric Gustavous Erickson (1857-1927), a superintendent for the Canadian Pacific Railway
- Fauquier, British Columbia – Frederick George Fauquier (1854-1917)
- Fort Fraser, British Columbia – Simon Fraser (explorer)
- Fort Ware, British Columbia – William Ware (1872–1957)
- Hagensborg – Hagen B. Christensen, first storekeeper and postmaster
- Haig, British Columbia – Douglas Haig, 1st Earl Haig
- Hedley, British Columbia – Robert R. Hedley (1863-1940), manager of the Hall Mines
- Hosmer, British Columbia – Charles Hosmer, railway official
- Houston, British Columbia – John Houston (newspaperman)
- Huntingdon, Abbotsford – Collis Potter Huntington, American industrialist and railway magnate
- Kimberley, British Columbia – John Wodehouse, 1st Earl of Kimberley
- Lister, British Columbia – Fred W. Lister
- Lytton, British Columbia – Edward Bulwer-Lytton
- McBride, British Columbia – Richard McBride
- McGregor, British Columbia – Captain James Herrick McGregor (1869–1915)
- Nelson, British Columbia – Hugh Nelson (Canadian politician)
- New Denver – James W. Denver
- Nicola, British Columbia – Nicola (Okanagan leader)
- Parksville, British Columbia - Nelson Parks, early postmaster
- Paterson, British Columbia – Archibald (Archie) Neil Paterson (1865-1935), postmaster or Thomas Wilson Paterson
- Port Alberni, British Columbia – Captain Pere d'Alberní
- Port Clements – Herbert Sylvester Clements
- Port Douglas, British Columbia – James Douglas (governor)
- Port McNeill – William Henry McNeill, American marine captain and explorer
- Port Moody, British Columbia – Richard Moody, first Lieutenant-Governor of the Colony of British Columbia.
- Prince George, British Columbia – King George III, King George V or Prince George, Duke of Kent
- Prince Rupert, British Columbia – Prince Rupert of the Rhine
- Robson, British Columbia – John Robson (politician)
- Rosebery, British Columbia – Archibald Primrose, 5th Earl of Rosebery
- Stewart, British Columbia – Robert Musket Stewart (1868-1954), first postmaster
- Taylor, British Columbia – Donald Herbert Taylor (1868–1955), a fur-trader
- Topley, British Columbia – William James Topley
- Vancouver, British Columbia – Captain George Vancouver, English explorer of Dutch descent (van Coevorden)
- Victoria, British Columbia – Queen Victoria
- Wilmer, British Columbia – Wilmer Cleveland Wells

==== Manitoba ====
- Alexander, Manitoba – John A. Macdonald
- Argyle, Manitoba – John Campbell, 9th Duke of Argyll
- Austin, Manitoba – Sidney Austin (1846-1881), British journalist of the London Graphic
- Barrows, Manitoba – Fredrick G. Barrows (1859–1940), founder of the Red Deer Lumber Company
- Camperville, Manitoba – Father C. J. Camper, an early Roman Catholic missionary
- Cartwright, Manitoba – Richard John Cartwright
- Churchill, Manitoba – John Churchill, 1st Duke of Marlborough
- Dugald, Manitoba – Dr. Dugald Campbell
- Elphinstone, Manitoba – William Elphinstone, 15th Lord Elphinstone
- Emerson, Manitoba – Ralph Waldo Emerson, American poet
- Erickson, Manitoba – E. Albert Erickson (1865-1913), postmaster
- Gladstone, Manitoba – William Ewart Gladstone, Prime Minister of United Kingdom
- Hartney – James Hartney, an early postmaster
- Laurier, Manitoba – Wilfrid Laurier
- McAuley, Manitoba – George W. McAuley (1860-1945), townsite owner
- McCreary, Manitoba – William McCreary, mayor of Winnipeg
- Morris, Manitoba – Alexander Morris (politician)
- Municipality of Brenda-Waskada – Major Adoniram Cates's daughter, Brenda Cates (1888–1964)
- Municipality of Harrison Park – David Howard Harrison
- Richer, Manitoba – Henri Isaïe Richer (1846-1911), first postmaster in the region
- Roblin, Manitoba – Rodmond Roblin
- Rural Municipality of Armstrong – James William Armstrong
- Rural Municipality of Cartier – George-Étienne Cartier
- Rural Municipality of Coldwell – George R. Coldwell
- Rural Municipality of De Salaberry – Charles de Salaberry
- Rural Municipality of Thompson – first postmaster, William Thompson
- Russell, Manitoba – Lord Alexander Russell
- Selkirk, Manitoba – Thomas Douglas, 5th Earl of Selkirk
- Starbuck, Manitoba – William H. Starbuck (1835-1896), a railroad financier from New York
- Thompson, Manitoba – Dr. John Fairfield Thompson, American metallurgist who became Inco's chairman
- Warren, Manitoba – Albert Edward Warren (d.1939), Western Vice President and general manager of the Canadian National Railway

==== New Brunswick ====
- Bathurst, New Brunswick – Henry Bathurst, 3rd Earl Bathurst
- Campbellton, New Brunswick – Sir Archibald Campbell, 1st Baronet
- Edmundston, New Brunswick – Edmund Walker Head
- Fredericton, New Brunswick – Prince Frederick, Duke of York
- Gordonsville, New Brunswick – Charles Gordon Glass
- McAdam, New Brunswick – John McAdam (politician)
- Minto, New Brunswick – Gilbert Elliot-Murray-Kynynmound, 4th Earl of Minto
- Sackville, New Brunswick – George Germain, 1st Viscount Sackville

==== Newfoundland and Labrador ====
- Campbellton, Newfoundland and Labrador – sawmill manager John Campbell
- Carmanville – Albert Carman
- Churchill Falls – Winston Churchill, Prime Minister of United Kingdom
- Cook's Harbour – James Cook
- Hawke's Bay, Newfoundland and Labrador – Edward Hawke, 1st Baron Hawke
- Massey Drive – Vincent Massey
- Port Hope Simpson – John Hope Simpson, British liberal politician
- Raleigh, Newfoundland and Labrador - Walter Raleigh

==== Northwest Territories ====
- Fort Liard - Simon-Xavier Liard, a French-Canadian fur trader who explored the area
- Fort McPherson, Northwest Territories – Murdoch McPherson, a chief trader for the Hudson's Bay Company
- Fort Simpson – George Simpson (HBC administrator)
- Fort Smith, Northwest Territories – Donald Smith, 1st Baron Strathcona and Mount Royal

==== Nova Scotia ====
- Halifax, Nova Scotia – George Montagu-Dunk, 2nd Earl of Halifax
- Sherbrooke, Nova Scotia – John Coape Sherbrooke
- Sydney, Nova Scotia – Thomas Townshend, Lord Sydney
- Wolfville, Nova Scotia – Elisha DeWolf

==== Ontario ====
- Armstrong, Ontario – Samuel Armstrong (Canadian politician)
- Barrie, Ontario – Sir Robert Barrie or Captain A. Barry
- Billings, Ontario – Elkanah Billings
- Brantford, Ontario – Joseph Brant
- Brockville, Ontario and Brock, Ontario – Isaac Brock
- Casselman, Ontario – Martin Major Casselman (1805–1881), founder and postmaster
- Casey, Ontario – George Elliott Casey
- Collingwood, Ontario – Cuthbert Collingwood, 1st Baron Collingwood
- Dryden, Ontario - John Dryden (Ontario politician)
- Dubreuilville - Napoléon Dubreuil (1913–1993), Joachim Dubreuil (1917–2001), Augustin Dubreuil (1924–2011) and Marcel Dubreuil (1927–2017), founders of a company logging town
- Englehart – Jacob Lewis Englehart, American business magnate
- Goderich, Ontario – F. J. Robinson, 1st Viscount Goderich, British prime minister
- Hamilton, Ontario – George Hamilton
- Harley, Ontario - Archibald Harley
- Harriston, Ontario – Archibald Harrison (1818-1878), first postmaster
- Haysville, Ontario – Robert Hays (1794-1874), early settler and first postmaster from Ireland
- Hearst, Ontario – William Howard Hearst, Premier of Ontario
- Huntsville, Ontario – George Hunt (British Army officer), first postmaster
- Kearney, Ontario – William Kearney, an early postmaster
- Kirkland Lake, Ontario – Ms. Winnifred Kirkland (1879-1960), secretary at the Ontario Department of Mines
- Kitchener, Ontario – Horatio Kitchener
- Maberly, Ontario – William Maberly
- Machin, Ontario - Harold Machin
- Markham, Ontario – William Markham
- McDougall, Ontario – William McDougall (Ontario politician)
- McKellar, Ontario – Archibald McKellar
- Morrisburg, Ontario – James Morris
- O'Connor, Ontario – James Joseph O'Connor (1857–1930)
- Peterborough, Ontario – Peter Robinson
- Point Edward, Ontario – Edward VII
- Port Sydney, Ontario - Albert Sydney-Smith (1846-1925), postmaster
- Schreiber, Ontario – Collingwood Schreiber
- Spence, Ontario – Robert Spence (Canadian politician), postmaster general
- Timmins, Ontario – Noah Timmins

==== Prince Edward Island ====
- Abram-Village - Abraham Arsenault, first settler
- Alexandra, Prince Edward Island - Alexandra of Denmark
- Charlottetown, Prince Edward Island – Queen Charlotte of Mecklenburg-Strelitz, consort of King George III the United Kingdom
- Georgetown, Prince Edward Island - George III
- Linkletter, Prince Edward Island - George Linkletter, American settler
- Morell, Prince Edward Island - Jean Francois Morel
- Murray Harbour - James Murray (British Army officer, born 1721)
- Victoria, Prince Edward Island - Queen Victoria

==== Quebec ====
- Abbotsford, Quebec – Rev. Joseph Abbott
- Albertville, Quebec - André-Albert Blais
- Arvida, Quebec - Arthur Vining Davis, American industrialist and philanthropist
- Audet, Quebec - Michel Audet (1832-1901), first postmaster
- Austin, Quebec – Nicholas Austin
- Authier, Quebec – Hector Authier
- Baie-Comeau - Napoléon-Alexandre Comeau
- Baie-Johan-Beetz – Johan Beetz, Belgian postmaster
- Beaconsfield, Quebec – Benjamin Disraeli, 1st Earl of Beaconsfield
- Blainville, Quebec – Jean-Baptiste Céloron de Blainville
- Boileau, Quebec - Perpetus Poissant dit Boileau, early postmaster
- Bowman, Quebec – Baxter Bowman
- Brossard - Georges-Henri Brossard (1902-1988), first mayor of the town
- Chandler, Quebec - Percy Milton Chandler (1873–1944), Philadelphian manufacturer and president of St. Lawrence. Pulp and Lumber Corporation
- Charlemagne, Quebec – Romuald-Charlemagne Laurier
- Chartierville – Jean-Baptiste Chartier, (1832–1917)
- Clarenceville, Quebec – William IV, Duke of Clarence
- Cleveland, Quebec – George Nelson Cleveland, the first mayor
- Cowansville - Peter Cowan, early postmaster of the area
- Dixville, Quebec - Richard "Dix" Baldwin (1808–1877), postmaster
- Dollard-des-Ormeaux – Adam Dollard des Ormeaux
- Drummondville, Quebec – Gordon Drummond
- Duhamel, Quebec – Joseph-Thomas Duhamel
- Elgin, Quebec – James Bruce, 8th Earl of Elgin
- Fassett, Quebec – Jacob Sloat Fassett, president of the Haskell Lumber Company
- Franklin, Quebec – John Franklin
- Frontenac, Quebec - Louis de Buade de Frontenac
- Girardville, Quebec – Joseph Girard (Canadian politician)
- Havelock, Quebec - Henry Havelock
- Joliette, Quebec – Barthélemy Joliette
- Kirkland, Quebec – Charles-Aimé Kirkland, a Canadian politician
- Labelle, Quebec - Antoine Labelle
- Louiseville – Princess Louise, Duchess of Argyll
- Manseau, Quebec - Father Martial Manseau (1870-1951)
- McMasterville – William McMaster (businessman)
- Montcerf-Lytton - Edward Bulwer-Lytton
- Mont-Laurier, Quebec and Laurierville, Quebec – Sir Wilfrid Laurier, Prime Minister of Canada
- Murdochville – James Y. Murdoch (1890–1962), president of Noranda mines
- Piopolis, Quebec – Pope Pius IX
- Routhierville - Alphonse Routhier (1875–1958), station master
- Saint-Adalbert, Quebec - Adalbert Blanchet (1848-1924)
- Saint-Aimé-des-Lacs - Father Aimé Néron (1915-1986)
- Saint-Alexandre-de-Kamouraska - Alexandre-Antonin Taché
- Saint-Alexis-de-Matapédia - Alexis Mailloux (1801-1877)
- Saint-Alexis-des-Monts - Alexis Lefebvre Boulanger (1812-1885), pioneer and farmer
- Saint-Alfred, Quebec - Joseph-Alfred Langlois (1876-1966), Bishop of Valleyfield
- Saint-Alphonse-de-Granby - Alphonsus Liguori
- Saint-Alphonse-Rodriguez - Alphonsus Rodriguez
- Saint-Ambroise, Quebec - Father Ambroise-Martial Fafard (1840-1899)
- Saint-André-Avellin - André Trudeau (1792-1842)
- Saint-André-d'Argenteuil - Saint Andrew
- Saint-André-de-Restigouche - André-Albert Blais
- Saint-Anicet - Pope Anicetus
- Saint-Antonin, Quebec - Antoine Proulx (1810-1896)
- Saint-Antoine-de-Tilly - Anthony of Padua
- Saint-Antoine-sur-Richelieu - Antoine Pécaudy de Contrecœur
- Saint-Athanase - Athanase David
- Saint-Augustin, Côte-Nord, Quebec - Augustin le Gardeur de Courtemanche
- Saint-Benjamin, Quebec - Benjamin Demers (1848-1919)
- Saint-Bernard-de-Lacolle - Bernard-Claude Panet
- Saint-Bernard-de-Michaudville - Alexis-Xyste Bernard
- Saint-Bruno-de-Guigues - Joseph-Bruno Guigues
- Saint-Camille-de-Lellis - Father Camille-Stanislas Brochu (1844-1905), founder and Saint Camillus de Lellis
- Saint-Charles-Garnier, Quebec - Charles Garnier (missionary)
- Saint-Cléophas - Father Joseph-Cléophas Saindon (1866-1941),
- Saint-Cléophas-de-Brandon - Cléophas Beausoleil
- Saint-Cyprien, Bas-Saint-Laurent - Father Joseph-Eustache-Cyprien Gagné (1835-1906)
- Saint-Damase, Bas-Saint-Laurent - Father Damase Morisset, the parish's founding priest
- Saint-Damase-de-L'Islet - Damase Ouellet (1826–1908), pioneer
- Saint-David-de-Falardeau - Father David Roussel (1835-1898) and Antoine-Sébastien Falardeau (1822-1889), painter
- Saint-Denis-de-Brompton - Father Joseph-Denis Bellemare (1857-1936)
- Saint-Donat, Bas-Saint-Laurent - Father Gabriel Nadeau (1808-1869)
- Saint-Edmond-les-Plaines - Father Joseph-Edmond Tremblay (1873-1943)
- Saint-Elzéar, Chaudière-Appalaches, Quebec - Elzéar-Henri Juchereau Duchesnay
- Saint-Eugène-d'Argentenay - Father Joseph-Eugène Bédard (1863-1918)
- Saint-Eugène-de-Ladrière - Eugène-Elzéar Pelletier (1878–1937) and Father Augustin Ladrière (1826-1884)
- Saint-Félix-d'Otis - Lucien Otis (1824-1868)
- Saint-Flavien - Pierre-Flavien Turgeon
- Saint-François-d'Assise, Quebec - François Cinq-Mars (1847-1902)
- Saint-Gabriel-de-Rimouski - Father Gabriel Nadeau (1808-1869)
- Saint-Godefroi - Charles-Godefroi Fournier (1829-1902), priest and founder
- Saint-Guillaume-Nord - Joseph-Guillaume-Laurent Forbes
- Saint-Honoré, Quebec - Honoré Petit
- Saint-Janvier-de-Joly - Reverend Janvier Lachance (1884-1952) and Henri-Gustave Joly de Lotbinière, Premier of Quebec
- Saint-Juste-du-Lac - Joseph-Juste-Ernest Gagnon (1874-1957)
- Saint-Léandre - Léandre Bernier, early settler
- Saint-Louis-de-Gonzague, Chaudière-Appalaches, Quebec - Louis-Nazaire Bégin or Louis-Philippe Pelletier
- Saint-Louis, Quebec - Louis-Zéphirin Moreau
- Saint-Ludger - Father Ludger Têtu (1821-1879)
- Saint-Magloire, Quebec - reverend Joseph-Magloire Rioux (1831-1908)
- Saint-Maxime-du-Mont-Louis - Maxime Tardif (1821–1850), secretary to Bishop Pierre-Flavien Turgeon
- Saint-Médard, Quebec - Joseph-Médard Belzile (1863-1953)
- Saint-Modeste - Modeste Demers
- Saint-Moïse - Father Moïse Duguay (1820-1870)
- Saint-Narcisse-de-Rimouski - Father Joseph-Narcisse Rioux
- Saint-Nazaire, Quebec - Louis-Nazaire Bégin
- Saint-Noël, Quebec - Noël Chabanel, Canadian martyr
- Saint-Octave-de-Métis - Monsignor Joseph-Octave Plessis
- Saint-Omer, Quebec - Monsignor Joseph-Omer Plante (1867-1948)
- Saint-Pamphile - Pamphile-Gaspard Verreault
- Saint-Pascal - Étienne-Paschal Taché
- Saint-Paul-de-l'Île-aux-Noix - Paul Bruchési
- Saint-Pierre-de-Lamy - Étienne Lamy
- Saint-Philibert, Quebec - reverend François-Philibert Lamontagne (1874-1949)
- Saint-René-de-Matane - René Goupil, Canadian martyr
- Saint-Théophile - Father Théophile Montminy (1842-1899)
- Saint-Thomas-Didyme - Michel-Thomas Labrecque
- Saint-Ubalde - Ubald Gingras (1824-1874)
- Saint-Ulric - Ulric-Joseph Tessier
- Saint-Vallier, Quebec - Jean-Baptiste de La Croix de Chevrières de Saint-Vallier
- Saint-Zacharie, Quebec - Zacharie Lacasse (1845-1921), Oblate missionary
- Saint-Zénon-du-Lac-Humqui - Father Zénon-Octave Gendron (1877-1932)
- Sainte-Aurélie - Catherine Aurelia Caouette, Ursuline nun at the end of the 19th century
- Sainte-Christine-d'Auvergne - Sister Sainte-Christine
- Sainte-Irène - Irène Sénécal (1887-1927), wife of Hector Laferté, Minister of Colonization, Hunting and Fisherie
- Sainte-Justine, Quebec - Marie-Justine Têtu (1833-1882)
- Sainte-Luce, Quebec - Luce-Gertrude Drapeau (1794–1880), wife of the local notary, Thomas Casault
- Sainte-Victoire-de-Sorel - Queen Victoria
- Salaberry-de-Valleyfield - Charles de Salaberry
- Schefferville – Bishop Lionel Scheffer (1903–1966)
- Shawville, Quebec - James Shaw (1818–1877)
- Sherbrooke, Quebec – John Coape Sherbrooke
- Victoriaville, Quebec – Queen Victoria

==== Saskatchewan ====
- Bracken, Saskatchewan - John Bracken
- Coleville, Saskatchewan – Malcolm Cole, early postmaster
- Colfax, Saskatchewan – Schuyler Colfax, US Vice President
- Cullen, Saskatchewan – William Cullen Bryant
- Davidson, Saskatchewan – Colonel Andrew Duncan Davidson
- Davis, Saskatchewan – Thomas Osborne Davis (Canadian politician)
- Dorintosh – Dorise Nielsen and Cameron Ross McIntosh
- Earl Grey, Saskatchewan – Albert Grey, 4th Earl Grey
- Estevan – George Stephen, 1st Baron Mount Stephen
- Herbert, Saskatchewan – Michael Henry Herbert
- Jansen, Saskatchewan – Nebraska rancher John Jansen
- King George, Saskatoon – George VI of United Kingdom
- Kuroki, Saskatchewan – Kuroki Tamemoto, Japanese general
- Lampman – Archibald Lampman
- Lebret, Saskatchewan – Father Louis Lebret, early postmaster of the community
- MacNutt – Thomas MacNutt
- Marcelin, Saskatchewan – Antoine Marcelin, first postmaster
- Martensville – Isaac Martens (1887–1987) and Dave Martens (1908–1984)
- Mervin, Saskatchewan – Mervin Archibald Gemmell (1895–1967), son of a first postmaster
- McLean, Saskatchewan – Donald McLean, a Scottish fur trader and explorer
- Melville, Saskatchewan – Charles Melville Hays, American railroad executive who was a president of the Grand Trunk Railway
- Mozart, Saskatchewan – Wolfgang Amadeus Mozart
- Plunkett, Saskatchewan – Viscount Horace Plunkett, a Canadian Pacific Railway investor
- Prince Albert, Saskatchewan – Prince Albert
- Queen Elizabeth, Saskatoon – Queen Elizabeth The Queen Mother
- Regina, Saskatchewan – Queen Victoria
- Rocanville – Rocan de Bastien, town´s first postmaster
- Rural Municipality of Reno No. 51 – Jesse L. Reno
- Simpson, Saskatchewan – George Simpson (HBC administrator)
- Togo, Saskatchewan – Togo Heihachiro, Japanese admiral
- Warman, Saskatchewan – Cy Warman, American journalist

==== Yukon ====
- Carmacks, Yukon – George Carmack, American prospector in the Yukon
- Dawson City – George Mercer Dawson
- Haines Junction – Francina E. Haines
- Watson Lake, Yukon – Frank Watson, an American-born trapper and prospector

=== Central African Republic ===
- Barthélémy Boganda Village (Nana-Mambéré) – Barthélemy Boganda, First Prime Minister
- Carnot, Central African Republic – Sadi Carnot, French President
- Charles de Gaulle Village (Kémo) - Charles de Gaulle
- David Dacko Village (Ouaka) - David Dacko
- Possel – Marshal Possel-Deydier, who was killed in combat against Rabih az-Zubayr at Kouno the year before
- Sibut – Adolphe Pierre Sibut

=== Chad ===
- Faya-Largeau – French Colonel, Étienne Largeau (1867–1916)

Former:

- Fort Archambault was the name of Sarh – Gustave Archambaud (1872–1899), French topographer
- Fort-Lamy was the name of N'Djamena – Amédée-François Lamy, an army officer

=== Chile ===
- Almirante Latorre (Coquimbo) - Juan José Latorre
- Aysén del General Carlos Ibáñez del Campo Region - Carlos Ibáñez del Campo, President
- Caleta Andrade (Aysén) - Francisco Andrade, early settler
- Caleta Errázuriz (Antofagasta) - Federico Errázuriz Echaurren, President
- Camerón - Alexander Allan Cameron (1868-1950), New Zealander ranch manager and cattle rancher
- Capitán Pastene - Juan Bautista Pastene
- Capitán Prat Province – Arturo Prat, naval hero
- Candelario Mancilla – José Candelario Mancilla Uribe (1900–1967), Chilean inhabitant of Lake O'Higgins
- Cardenal Caro Province – José María Caro Rodríguez, first Cardinal of Chile
- Catalina (Antofagasta) - Catherine of Alexandria
- Cochrane – Thomas Cochrane, 10th Earl of Dundonald, captain
- Colón (O'Higgins) - Christopher Columbus
- Coronel Alcérreca (Arica y Parinacota) - José Miguel Alcérreca
- Curiñanco - cacique Curiñancu, father of the Mapuche leader Lautaro
- Diego de Almagro, Chile – Diego de Almagro
- Domeyko (Atacama) - Ignacy Domeyko, polish geologist
- Ercilla, Chile - Alonso de Ercilla
- Galvarino – Galvarino, Mapuche leader during the War of Arauco
- Gorbea – Andrés Antonio de Gorbea (1792–1852), founder and first dean of the Faculty of Mathematical and Exact Sciences of the University of Chile
- General Lagos – General Pedro Lagos, commander of Chilean troops in the Battle of Arica
- Juan López (Antofagasta) - Juan López Alfaro (1823-1874), early settler
- Lambert (Coquimbo) - Charles Saint Lambert, Franco-Chilean mining engineer and businessman
- Lautaro – Lautaro, Mapuche leader during the War of Arauco
- María Elena, Chile - Mary Ellen Comdon (d.1927), wife of the first saltpeter refinery works manager
- María Pinto - María Pinto, landowner
- Molina, Chile – Juan Ignacio Molina, Jesuit
- Osorno, Chile – Ambrosio O'Higgins, founder and Marquis of Osorno
- Padre José Fernandez Perez (Puerto Montt) – José Fernandez Perez (1919–2000), Spanish priest
- Padre Hurtado – Saint Alberto Hurtado
- Pedro Aguirre Cerda, Chile – Pedro Aguirre Cerda, President
- Puerto Bertrand - Alejandro Bertrand (1854-1942), geographer
- Puerto Ingeniero Ibáñez – Cornelio Ibáñez, topographer
- Puerto Montt – Manuel Montt, President
- Puerto Raúl Marín Balmaceda - Raúl Marín Balmaceda (1907-1957), lawyer
- Puerto Saavedra – Cornelio Saavedra Rodríguez, military figure who played a major role in the Occupation of the Araucanía
- Puerto Sánchez (Aysen) - Eulogio Sánchez Errázuriz (1903–1956), pioneer in civil aviation
- Puerto Varas – Antonio Varas, minister of the interior
- Puerto Williams – Juan Williams Rebolledo, Chilean admiral
- Punta Abarca - Arturo Abarca Arredondo, Second Class Pilot of the Chilean Navy
- Rengo - cacique Renco
- San Fernando – Saint Ferdinand
- San Pedro de Atacama – Saint Peter
- Santiago – James, son of Zebedee (Saint James)
- Sewell, Chile - Barton Sewell, president of the Braden Copper Company
- Talagante - Tala Canta Ilabe
- Talcahuano - Araucanian chief, Talcahueñu
- Teodoro Schmidt – Teodoro Schmidt
- Valdivia – Pedro de Valdivia, conqueror of Chile
- Vicuña, Chile – Colonel Joaquín Vicuña Larraín, founder of a city
- Villa Frei (Coyhaique) – Eduardo Frei Montalva, President
- Villa O'Higgins – Bernardo O'Higgins, libertador of Chile
- Villa Ortega (Aysén) - Gumersindo Ortega Monroy, landowner

Former:

- Magellano was the name of Punta Arenas – Ferdinand Magellan

=== China ===
- Bainang County - Baza Nimazhaba and Nalang Duojidunjiong, two Buddhist masters who practiced and taught in the region during the 13th century
- Chuxiong City – Zhuang Qiao & Zhao Yong (general) (also known as Nanxiong), two great militaries of the Ming Dynasty
- Cunrui - Dong Cunrui, PLA Soldier
- Dongpo, Meishan - Su Shi, Chinese poet of the Song Dynasty
- Gensi Township – Yang Gensi, PLA soldier
- Gongzhuling - Princess Hejing (born 1731)
- Haiming Subdistrict (Jilin) - Liu Haiming, revolutionary martyr
- Huanghua – Huang Hua, communist revolutionary
- Huangxing, Changsha - Huang Xing, hero of the Xinhai Revolution
- Jiageng Village (Fujian) - Tan Kah Kee
- Jingyu, Jilin – General Yang Jingyu
- Kaihui - Yang Kaihui, second wife of Mao Zedong
- Kurban Tulum Scenic Area & Localities (Xinjiang) - Kurban Tulum
- Leifeng Subdistrict – Lei Feng, PLA soldier
- Lishan Village (Hunan) - Yu Pengnian (Peng Lishan)
- Maixin (Inner Mongolia) - Mai Xin (1914-1947), Communist musician
- Maoming – scholar and doctor Pan Maoming
- Mingchuan Township (Anhui) - Liu Mingchuan
- Qinhuangdao (lit. 'Emperor Qin Island') – Qin Shi Huang, first emperor of China
- Qinngis Han (Inner Mongolia) - Genghis Khan
- Sayram Town (Xinjiang) - Musa Sayrami, historian
- Shangzhi - Zhao Shangzhi
- Shichang Subdistrict (Guizhou) - Long Shichang (1928–1952), local soldier of the Miao ethnic
- Tiaoyuan (Sichuan) - Li Diaoyuan (1734-1803), Qing dynasty scholar, writer, and opera theorist.
- Tong Linge Road, Zhao Dengyu Road, Zhang Zizhong Road – Tong Linge, Zhao Dengyu, Zhang Zizhong, soldiers in the Second Sino-Japanese War
- Wentong Town (Sichuan) - Meng Wentong (1894–1968), Chinese historian, classical scholar, and educator
- Xiangqian Town (Fujian) - Lin Xiangqian (1892-1923), leader of the Beijing-Hankou Railway Workers' Great Strike
- Xiumei Town (Henan) - Lin Xiumei (1880-1921), Chinese military figure
- Yin Lingzhi (Shaanxi) - Yin Lingzhi (1931-1948), PLA female soldier
- Yemin (Liaoning) - An Ye Min (1937-1958), Communist martyr
- Yingjun – Liu Yingjun (1945–1966), PLA soldier
- Yuanshi County - Shaohao
- Yunhuan Subdistrict (Jiamusi) - Shao Yunhuan (1951–1999), local journalist who tragically died during U.S. bombing of the Chinese Embassy in Yugoslavia
- Zhangjiachuan Hui Autonomous County - Zhang Qian
- Zhangjiajie - Zhang Liang (Western Han)
- Zhidan County – Liu Zhidan, military commander and Communist leader
- Zhongshan, Guangdong – Birthplace of Sun Yat-sen, also known as Sun Zhongshan, Chinese political theorist and revolutionary politician, Father of the Nation and former President of the Republic of China. City formerly known as Xiangshan.
- Zhude Town (Sichuan) - Zhu De
- Zicai Subdistrict (Guangxi) - Feng Zicai, general of the imperial army during the Qing Dynasty
- Zichang County – Xie Zichang (1897–1935), Communist martyr
- Zizhou County - Li Zizhou (1892-1929)
- Zonghan Subdistrict (Zhejiang) - Ma Zonghan (1884-1907), Chinese revolutionary
- Zuoquan County – Zuo Quan, a general in the Chinese Red Army

==== Hong Kong ====
- Aberdeen – George Hamilton-Gordon, 4th Earl of Aberdeen
- Belcher Bay – Edward Belcher
- Bowrington – Sir John Bowring
- Cape D'Aguilar – George Charles D'Aguilar
- Cho Yiu Chuen – Sir Cho Yiu Kwan
- Jat Min Chuen – Tan Jat Min
- Kellet Island – Henry Kellett
- Kennedy Town – Arthur Edward Kennedy
- Lai Tak Tsuen – Michael Wright (known in Cantonese as Wu Lai-tak)
- Lee Chung Yin Road
- Morrison Hill – Robert Morrison
- Mount Davis – John Francis Davis
- St. Paul's Village – St. Paul
- Stanley – Edward Smith-Stanley, 14th Earl of Derby
- Victoria City – Queen Victoria
- Wesley Village – John Wesley

=== Colombia ===
- Ábrego – Mercedes Abrego, Colombian independence heroine
- Acevedo, Huila – José Acevedo y Gómez
- Agustín Codazzi, Cesar – Agustín Codazzi
- Albán, Cundinamarca – Carlos Albán
- Albania, La Guajira – Alba Londoño Sánchez (1923–2023), daughter of the commissar of La Guajira, Eduardo Londoño Villegas
- Alfonso Lopez (Chocó) – Alfonso López Pumarejo
- Almaguer, Cauca – Francisco Briceño, Corral de Almaguer
- Alvarado, Tolima – Pedro de Alvarado
- Antonio Nariño, Bogotá – Antonio Nariño
- Anzoátegui, Tolima – José Antonio Anzoátegui
- Aranzazu, Caldas – Juan de Dios Aranzazu
- Arbeláez – Vicente Arbeláez (1822–1884)
- Armero – José León Armero, national martyr
- Balboa, Cauca – Vasco Núñez de Balboa
- Balboa, Risaralda – Vasco Núñez de Balboa
- Barbosa, Antioquia – Diego Fernández Barbosa
- Beltrán, Cundinamarca – Francisco Felix Beltran
- Betéitiva – cacique Betacín
- Bolívar, Cauca – Simón Bolívar
- Bolívar, Santander – Simón Bolívar
- Bolívar, Valle del Cauca – Simón Bolívar
- Bosconia – John Bosco
- Briceño, Antioquia and Briceño, Boyacá – José Manuel Briceño
- Busbanzá – cacique Boazá
- Cabrera, Cundinamarca – General Cabrera, who was participated in Liberal war
- Caicedonia – Lisandro Caicedo (1806–1891) and Emilia Caicedo de Gutiérrez (1872-1950), benefactors of the town
- Cajicá – cacique Cajic
- Calarcá – cacique Calarcá
- Caldas, Boyacá – Francisco José de Caldas, a Colombian independence hero
- Camilo Torres (Norte de Santander) – Camilo Torres Restrepo, Colombian socialist and priest
- Cerinza – cacique Cerinza
- Charalá – cacique Chalalá
- Chipatá – cacique Chipatá
- Ciudad Bolívar, Antioquia – Simón Bolívar
- Ciudad Bolívar, Bogotá – Simón Bolívar
- Ciudad Mutis – José Celestino Mutis
- Clemencia, Bolívar – Maria Clemencia Grau
- Colón, Nariño – Christopher Columbus
- Colón, Putumayo – Christopher Columbus
- Commune 5 Javier Manuel Vargas Granados (Yopal, Casanare) – Javier Manuel Vargas Granados (died in 2000), Yopal councilior
- Córdoba, Bolívar – Jose Maria Córdoba, an independence hero
- Córdoba, Nariño – Jose Maria Córdoba
- Don Matías – Don Matías Jaramillo
- Duitama, Tundama Province – cacique Tundama
- Durania – Justo Leonidas Durán
- Elias, Huila – Manuel Elías Carvajal
- Engativá – cacique Ingativá
- Firavitoba – cacique Firavía
- Fonseca, La Guajira – Catalan colonizer Agustín Fonseca
- Funes, Nariño – Aragonese missioner Lucas Funes
- Francisco Pizarro, Nariño – Francisco Pizarro
- Gaitanía – Jorge Eliécer Gaitán, writer, lawyer and politician
- Girardota – Atanasio Girardot
- Giraldo, Antioquia – Rafael María Giraldo
- González, Cesar – Florentino Gonzalez (1805–1874)
- Gómez Plata – Bishop of Antioquia, Juan de la Cruz Gomez Plata
- Gualmatán – cacique Guatán
- Gutiérrez, Cundinamarca – Ignacio Gutierrez Vergara (founder)
- Gutiérrez Province – Santos Gutiérrez, President of Colombia
- Herrán – Pedro Alcántara Herrán, Colombian general and statesman
- Inírida, Guainía – Princess Inirida
- Juan de Acosta – Juan de Acosta
- Kennedy, Bogotá – John F. Kennedy, president of United States
- Leticia, Amazonas – Leticia Smith
- López de Micay – José Hilario López
- Madrid, Cundinamarca – Pedro Fernández Madrid (1817–1875)
- Magüí Payán – Eliseo Payán
- Maní, Casanare – Cacique Maní
- Mariano Ospina Pérez (Boyacá) – Mariano Ospina Pérez, president of Colombia
- Morales, Bolívar – Pedro Vicente de Morales (founder)
- Morales, Cauca – Luis Jerónimo Morales and Juan Manuel Morales
- Mosquera – Tomás Cipriano de Mosquera, former president of Colombia
- Mosquera, Nariño – Tomás Cipriano de Mosquera
- Nariño, Antioquia – Antonio Nariño
- Nariño, Cundinamarca – Antonio Nariño
- Nariño, Nariño – Antonio Nariño
- Nemocón – zipa Nemequene
- Olaya, Antioquia – Enrique Olaya Herrera, president of Colombia
- Olaya Herrera – Enrique Olaya Herrera, president of Colombia
- Onzaga – cacique Hunzaá
- Ortega, Tolima – Juan de Ortega y Carrillo
- Ospina – Mariano Ospina Rodríguez, president of Colombia
- Ospina Perez (Nariño) – Mariano Ospina Pérez
- Padilla, Cauca – José Prudencio Padilla
- Palmar de Varela – Catalino Varela
- Pereira, Colombia – Francisco Pereira Martínez
- Policarpa, Nariño – Policarpa Salavarrieta
- Puente Aranda – Juan Aranda
- Puerto Berrío – Pedro Justo Berrío
- Puerto Caicedo – Juan Maria Caicedo Martinez (1910–2006), a Colombian engineer
- Puerto Carreño – Pedro Maria Carreño (1874–1946), Colombian Minister of External Relations from 1912 to 1913
- Puerto Gaitán – Jorge Eliécer Gaitán
- Puerto Guzmán – Jorge Julio Guzman Flor (died in 2020), founder
- Puerto Leguízamo – Candido Leguízamo (1911–1933), Colombia–Peru War hero
- Puerto Lleras – Alberto Lleras Camargo, President of Colombia
- Puerto Lleras (Arauca) – Alberto Lleras Camargo
- Puerto Lleras (Norte de Santander) – Alberto Lleras Camargo
- Puerto López, Meta – Alfonso López Pumarejo, President of Colombia
- Puerto Nariño – Antonio Nariño, an Independence hero
- Puerto Ospina (Guaviare) – Mariano Ospina Pérez
- Puerto Ospina (Putumayo) – Mariano Ospina Pérez
- Puerto Parra – Aquileo Parra
- Puerto Rondón – Juan José Rondón
- Puerto Santander, Amazonas – Francisco de Paula Santander, a Colombian independence hero
- Puerto Santander, Norte de Santander – Francisco de Paula Santander, a Colombian independence hero
- Puerto Tejada, Cauca – General Manuel Tejada Sanchez
- Puerto Wilches – José Solón Wilches Calderón (1835–1893)
- Rafael Uribe Uribe, Bogotá – Rafael Uribe Uribe, a Colombian politician
- Ragonvalia – Ramón González Valencia
- Restrepo – Emiliano Restrepo Echeverria (1832–1918)
- Restrepo, Valle del Cauca – Carlos Eugenio Restrepo
- Roberto Payán – Colonel Roberto Payán Hurtado (d.1934), a brother of President Eliseo Payán
- Rovira, Tolima – Custodio García Rovira
- Ricaurte, Nariño – Antonio Ricaurte
- Rivera, Huila – José Eustasio Rivera
- Rondón, Boyacá – Juan José Rondón
- Saboyá – cacique Saboyá
- Salazar de las Palmas – Alonso Perez de Salazar
- Salgar – Eustorgio Salgar
- San Eduardo, Boyacá – Eduardo Maldonado Calvo (1860–1932)
- San Fernando, Bolívar – Ferdinand III of Castile
- San José de Albán – Carlos Albán
- San José del Fragua – Giuseppe Fusaroli (1927–2015), Italian missionary who visited in Colombia
- San José de Kennedy (Magdalena) – John F. Kennedy
- San Vicente del Caguán – Vincent de Paul
- Santa Sofía, Boyacá – Sofia Angulo de Reyes (1843–1898)
- Santander de Quilichao – Francisco de Paula Santander
- Sativanorte – cacique Sátiva
- Sativasur – cacique Sátiva
- Silvania, Colombia – Ismael Silva (1895–1962), founder
- Sogamoso, Sugamuxi Province – iraca Sugamuxi
- Solano, Caquetá – Jose Dolores Solano (1891–1961), Colombia–Peru War hero
- Somondoco – cacique Somendoco or Sumindoco
- Suárez, Cauca – Marco Fidel Suárez, President of Colombia
- Suárez, Tolima – Marco Fidel Suárez, President of Colombia
- Sucre, Cauca – Antonio José de Sucre
- Sucre, Santander – Antonio José de Sucre
- Sucre, Sucre Department – Antonio José de Sucre
- Techo – cacique Techitina
- Tutazá – cacique Tutazúa
- La Uribe – Antonio Uribe
- Usaquén – cacique Usaque
- Ulloa, Valle de Cauca – General José Eleuterio Ulloa
- Uribia, La Guajira – Rafael Uribe Uribe
- Valdivia, Antioquia – Andrés de Valdivia
- Villa Caro – José Eusebio Caro
- Villa de Leyva – Andrés Díaz Venero de Leiva
- Villa Germania (Cesar) – Manuel Germán Cuello Gutiérrez (1915–2006), Governor of Cesar Department
- Villagarzón – colonel Julio Garzón Moreno (1902–1982), founder
- Villagómez – Monseñor Misael Gomez Torres (1880–1967)
- Villapinzón – Propsero Pinzon (1856–1901)
- Villavicencio – Antonio Villavicencio, an Independence Hero
- Zambrano, Bolívar – Álvaro de Zambrano
- Zapayán – cacique Zapayán

=== Democratic Republic of the Congo ===
- Cité Maman Mobutu (Kinshasa) – Marie-Antoinette Mobutu (1941–1977), First Lady of the Democratic Republic of the Congo
- Cité Mzee Laurent Désiré Kabila (Kinshasa) – Laurent-Désiré Kabila, President
- Kasa-Vubu, Kinshasa – Joseph Kasa-Vubu
- Lumumba (Lodja) – Patrice Lumumba, First Prime Minister
- Lumumbaville – Patrice Lumumba, First Prime Minister

Former:

- Albertville was the name of Kalemie – Albert I of Belgium
- Coquilhatville was the name of Mbandaka – Camille-Aimé Coquilhat
- Élisabethville was the name of Lubumbashi – Queen Elizabeth of Belgium
- Jadotville was the name of Likasi – Jean Jadot
- Léopoldville was the name of Kinshasa – Leopold II of Belgium
- Ponthierville was the name of Ubundu – Pierre Ponthier
- Stanleyville was the name of Kisangani – Henry Morton Stanley
- Thysville was the name of Mbanza-Ngungu – Albert Thys

=== Republic of the Congo ===
- Brazzaville – Pierre Savorgnan de Brazza
- Dolisie – Albert Dolisie
- Lumumba (Point Noire) – Patrice Lumumba

Former:

- Fort-Rousset was the name of Owando – Alexis Rousset, French colonial administrator
- Jacob was the name of Nkayi – Léon Jacob, French engineer

=== Costa Rica ===
- Abangares (canton) – Cacique Avancari
- Acosta (canton) – Tomás de Acosta y Hurtado de Mendoza (1747–1821), Governor of province of Costa Rica
- Alfaro (Alajuela) – Juan Alfaro Ruiz (1810–1856), Costa Rican military and hero of the Filibuster war
- Alvarado (canton) – Presbyter Joaquin Alvarado Ruiz (d.1890)
- Anselmo Llorente District and Llorente District – Anselmo Llorente y La Fuente (1800–1871), Costa Rican Bishop
- Aserrí (canton) – Cacique Aczarri
- Bagaces – Cacique Bagatzi
- Barva – Cacique Barvak
- Biolley (Puntarenas) – Paul Biolley (1862–1908), Swiss educator and naturalist
- Bolívar District, Grecia – Simón Bolívar
- Cañas (canton) – José María Cañas, Salvadoran military figure
- Carmona District, Nandayure – José Daniel Carmona Briceño (1869–1929)
- Carrillo (canton) – Braulio Carrillo Colina, a head of state of Costa Rica
- Cervantes District – Juan de Cervantes
- Ciudad Cortés – León Cortés Castro. President of Costa Rica
- Ciudad Neily – Ricardo Neily Jop (1912–2000), a Lebanese citizen and founder of a city
- Curridabat – Cacique Corriava
- Daniel Flores District – José Daniel Flores Zavaleta (1876–1958), Costa Rican teacher
- Daniel Oduber (Liberia) – Daniel Oduber Quirós
- Dota (canton) – Cacique Ota
- El Guarco (canton) – Cacique El Guarco
- Flores (canton) – Don Juan J.Flores Umaña (1843–1903), a Costa Rican physician
- Garcia Flamenco (Guanacaste) – Marcelino Garcia Flamenco (1888–1919), a Salvadoran teacher
- Goicoechea (canton) – Fray José Antonio de Liendo y Goicoechea
- Gutiérrez Braun District – Federico Gutiérrez Braun (1883–1966), Costa Rican engineer and cartographer
- Heredia, Costa Rica – Alonso Fernández de Heredia, a President of the Real Audiencia of Guatemala
- Jiménez (canton) – Jesús Jiménez Zamora President of Costa Rica
- León Cortés (canton) – León Cortés Castro President of Costa Rica
- Llano Brenes (Alajuela) – Alberto Manuel Brenes (1870–1948)
- Mayorga de Liberia – Francisco Mayorga Rivas (1864–1940)
- Montes de Oca (canton) – Don Faustino Montes de Oca (1860–1902), a former congressional representative from the area
- Montezuma, Costa Rica – Moctezuma II, an Aztec Emperor
- Mora (canton) – Juan Rafael Mora Porras and Juan Mora Fernández
- Moravia (canton) – Juan Rafael Mora Porras, President of Costa Rica and National Hero
- Morazan (Alajuela), Morazan (San Jose) and Morazan (Limon) – Francisco Morazán
- Naranjito de Aguirre – Rolando Aguirre Lobo (1918–1948)
- Oreamuno (canton) – Francisco María Oreamuno Bonilla, President of Costa Rica
- Orlich (Alajuela) – Francisco Orlich Bolmarcich
- Orotina – Gurutina, indigenous king of the chorotega ethnic
- Osa (canton) – Cacique Osa
- Pérez Zeledón (canton) – Pedro Pérez Zeledón (1854–1930), Jurist and diplomat
- Pittier District – Henri François Pittier
- Pococí (canton) – Cacique Pococi
- Puerto Jiménez and Jiménez, Pococí – Ricardo Jiménez Oreamuno President of Costa Rica
- Puerto Soley (Guanacaste) – Tomás Soley Güell (1875–1943), Costa Rican economist
- Puerto Thiel (Guanacaste) – Monseñor Bernardo Augusto Thiel (1850–1901)
- Puerto Vargas (Limon) – Balvanero Vargas Molina (1833–1905), Governor of Limon
- Quesada, San Carlos – Napoleon Quesada Salazar (1873–1937), Poet
- Rincón Ulate (Sarchi) – Otilio Ulate Blanco
- Rivas, Costa Rica – Domingo Rivas Salvatierra (1836–1900)
- Rodríguez District – Herminio de Jesús Rodríguez Gonzalez (1892–1965)
- Santa Bárbara de Heredia – Saint Barbara
- Santa Ana (canton) – Saint Anne
- San Carlos (canton) – Saint Charles Borromeo
- Santo Domingo (canton), Costa Rica – Saint Dominic
- San Isidro (canton) – Saint Isidro Labrador
- San Isidro de El General – Saint Isidro Labrador and General Bernardo Soto Alfaro, President of Costa Rica
- San José, Costa Rica – Saint Joseph
- San Mateo de Alajuela – Saint Matthew
- San Pablo (canton) – Saint Paul of Tarsus
- San Rafael (canton) – Saint Raphael
- San Ramón, Costa Rica – Saint Raymond Nonnatus or Ramon Salas Sandoval (1838–1902) and Ramon Rodriguez Solorzano (1818–1893), two prominent figures in San Ramon
- San Vito (Costa Rica) – Saint Vitus or Vito Sansonetti (1916–1999), Italian marine and founder of San Vito de Java
- Valverde (San Ramon) – Carlos Luis Valverde (1903–1948), Costa Rican physician and revolutionary
- Vázquez de Coronado (canton) – Conquistador Juan Vázquez de Coronado
- Volio District – Julián Volio Llorente

Former:

- Aguirre (now Quepos) – Rolando Aguirre Lobo: a hero of Revolution of 1948
- Alfaro Ruiz (now Zarcero) – Colonel Juan Alfaro Ruiz, a hero of the National Campaign of 1856
- Valverde Vega (now Sarchí) – Carlos Luis Valverde Vega, a physician and founder of the Unión Médica Nacional (National Medical Union).

=== Croatia ===
- Dinko Šimunović (Zagreb) – Dinko Šimunović, Croatian writer
- Ernestinovo – Mrs. Ernestina Klein
- Eugen Kvaternik (Zagreb) – Eugen Kvaternik, Croatian nationalist politician
- Ferdinandovac – Ferdinand I of Austria, President of the German Confederation, King of Hungary
- Generalski Stol – General Vuk Krsto Frankopan
- Ivan Mažuranić (Zagreb) – Ivan Mažuranić, Croatian poet, lawyer and politician
- Josipdol - Joseph II, Holy Roman Emperor
- Kneževi Vinogradi - Prince Eugene of Savoy
- Karlovac – King Charles II of Austria
- Maksimir – Maksimilijan Vrhovac, bishop of Zagreb
- Ošljak – Known in Italian and historical documents as Calugerà or Calogerà, after the Calogerà family who owned it
- Oton Župančič (Zagreb) – Oton Župančič, Slovene poet
- Strossmayerovac - Josip Juraj Strossmayer
- Tomislavovac – Tomislav of Yugoslavia

Former:

- Kardeljevo was the name of Ploče from 1950 through 1954 and from 1980 through 1990 – Edvard Kardelj
- Titova Korenica was the name of Korenica from 1945 through 1997 – Josip Broz Tito

=== Cuba ===
- Bartolomé Masó, Cuba – Bartolomé Masó, a Cuban patriot and President of Cuba
- Briones Montoto (Cuba) – Antonio Briones Montoto (1940–1967), Cuban revolutionary
- Calixto García, Cuba – Calixto García Iñiguez, an independence war hero
- Camilo Cienfuegos (Santa Cruz del Norte) – Camilo Cienfuegos, Cuban revolutionary
- Cárdenas, Cuba – Mateo de Cárdenas y Vélez de Guevara
- Central José Smith Comas (Cárdenas) – José Smith Comas (1932–1956)
- Cespedes, Cuba – Carlos Manuel de Céspedes, Father of the Cuban Fatherland and first President of Cuba
- Cienfuegos – José Cienfuegos Jovellanos, Captain General of Cuba
- Ciro Redondo – Ciro Redondo, a Cuban revolutionary
- Colón, Cuba – Christopher Columbus
- Emilio Córdova (Encrucijada) – Emilio Córdova Garcia (1938–1958)
- Frank País, Cuba – revolutionary Frank País
- Héctor Molina (San Nicolás) – Héctor Molina Riaño (1922–1958)
- Hermanos Saíz (San Juan y Martínez) – The Saiz Brothers who died in action in 1957
- Heriberto Orellanes (La Sierpe) – Heriberto Felipe Orellana (1926–1959)
- Holguín – Captain García Holguín, Spanish military officer
- Jesús Menéndez – Cuban trade unionist Jesús Menéndez Larrondo
- Juan Gualberto Gómez (Matanzas) – Juan Gualberto Gómez
- Loynaz Hechavarría (Holguin) – Loynaz Hechavarría Cordovés (1911–1956)
- Manuel Sanguily (Ciego de Avila) – Manuel Sanguily (1848–1925)
- Mariel, Cuba – Cacique Marien
- Martí, Cuba – Cuban Independence Hero José Martí
- Niceto Pérez – Cuban peasant Niceto Perez Garcia
- Obdulio Morales (Sanctis Spiritus) – Obdulio Morales (1910–1981), Cuban compositor
- Pablo de la Torriente Brau (Bahía Honda) – Pablo de la Torriente Brau (1901–1936)
- Pedro Betancourt – Pedro Betancourt Dávalos
- Piti Fajardo (Trinidad) – Manuel "Piti" Fajardo (1930–1960)
- Ramon Balboa (Cienfuegos) – Ramon Balboa Monzon (1939–1958)
- Raúl Hernández Vidal (San Antonio de los Baños) – Raúl Hernández Vidal (1948–1978), Cuban pilot
- Reynold García (Calimete) – Reynold García García (1922–1956)
- Sabino Hernández (Santo Domingo) – Sabino Hernandez Casal (died in 1959)
- Sandino, Cuba – Nicaraguan revolutionary Augusto César Sandino
- Santiago de Cuba – James, son of Zebedee
- Silvio Caro (Bahía Honda) – Silvio Nestor Caro (1943–1966)

=== Curaçao ===
- Willemstad – William II, Prince of Orange or his son William III of England

=== Cyprus ===
- Agios Athanasios, Cyprus – Athanasius of Alexandria
- Ayios Dhometios – Saint Dometius of Persia
- Ethnomártyras Kyprianós (Strovolos) – Kyprianos of Cyprus
- Makarios (Kato Polemidia) – Makarios III
- Paphos – Paphos, daughter of Pygmalion (mythology)

=== Czech Republic ===
- Adamov (Blansko District) – Adam Josef, Prince of Liechtenstein, ironworks owner
- Alojzov – Alois I, Prince of Liechtenstein
- Barrandov, Prague – Joachim Barrande
- Chlum Svaté Maří – Mary, mother of Jesus
- Františkovy Lázně – Francis II, Holy Roman Emperor
- Golčův Jeníkov – Martin Maxmillian Goltz, general of the Habsburg army
- Havlíčkův Brod – Karel Havlíček Borovský
- Jáchymov – St. Joachim
- Jindřichův Hradec – Jindřich z Hradce, owner of the castle in the town
- Fortress Josefov and Josefov (Prague) – Joseph II, Holy Roman Emperor
- Halasovo Kunštátsko – František Halas
- Karlín – Caroline Augusta of Bavaria
- Karlovy Vary – Charles IV, Holy Roman Emperor
- Karlštejn Castle and village – Charles IV, Holy Roman Emperor
- Masarykova čtvrť (Brno) – Tomáš Masaryk
- Mladá Boleslav – Boleslaus II of Bohemia
- Špindlerův Mlýn – Spindler, a miller
- Štefánikova čtvrť (Brno) – Milan Rastislav Štefánik
- Švermova (Bruntál) – Jan Šverma
- Stará Boleslav – Boleslaus I of Bohemia
- Terezín – Empress Maria Theresa of Austria
- Vítkov – Vítek z Kravař
- Žižkov – Jan Žižka

Former:

- Gottwaldov was the name of Zlín from 1948 through 1990 – Klement Gottwald

=== Denmark ===
- Albertslund – Albert de Rault de Ramsault de Tortonval (1778–1855), a French noble
- Augustenborg – Auguste, duchess of Schleswig-Holstein
- Carlsberg (district) – Carl Jacobsen, a Danish brewer, art collector and philanthropist
- Charlottenlund – Princess Charlotte Amalie of Denmark
- Christiania – Christian IV of Denmark
- Christiansfeld – Christian VII of Denmark
- Christianshavn – Christian IV of Denmark
- Dronninglund – Queen Charlotte Amalie
- Fredericia – King Frederick III of Denmark
- Frederiks – King Frederick VI of Denmark
- Frederiksberg – King Frederick IV of Denmark
- Frederikshavn – King Frederick VI of Denmark
- Frederikssund – Frederick III of Denmark
- Frederiksværk – King Frederick V of Denmark
- Gudhjem – God
- Karlslunde – Kalf Skurfa
- Liseleje – Elisabeth (Lise) Classen (1760–1805)
- Mariager – Blessed Virgin Mary
- Marielyst – Marie Kørgensen (1837–1907)

==== Greenland ====
- Christianshåb (Inuit: Qasigiannguit) – King Christian VI of Denmark
- Frederikshåb (Inuit: Paamiut) – King Frederick V of Denmark
- Jakobshavn (Inuit: Ilulissat) – Jakob Severin, a fur trader

=== Dominica ===
- Salisbury, Dominica – Robert Gascoyne-Cecil, 3rd Marquess of Salisbury
- Scotts Head, Dominica – Colonel George Scott (British Army officer)

=== Dominican Republic ===
- Ángel Feliz (Independencia) - General Ángel Feliz (d.1870), Hero of the Dominican Restoration War
- Aniceto Martínez (Elias Piña) - General Aniceto Martínez, Hero of the Dominican Restoration War
- Apolinar Perdomo (Bahoruco) - Apolinar Perdomo Sosa (1882-1918), poet
- Bisonó - José Elías Bisonó (1877-1924)
- Cabral, Dominican Republic – José María Cabral
- Cabrera, María Trinidad Sánchez – General Jose Cabrera (1810-1884), hero of the Dominican Restoration War
- Castillo, Dominican Republic – General Manuel María Castillo (1834-1921), hero of the Dominican Restoration War
- Cayetano Germosén – Cayetano Germosén (d.1861), Dominican patriot and martyr of the Dominican Restoration War
- Ciudad Juan Bosch (Santo Domingo) – Juan Bosch (politician), Dominican President
- Colonia Libertador (Dajabon) – Rafael Trujillo (libertator)
- Comendador, Dominican Republic – Nicolás de Ovando (Comendador of Lares)
- Duarte Province – Juan Pablo Duarte, founder of the Dominican Republic
- Duvergé – General Antonio Duvergé, Dominican independence hero
- Eugenio Perdomo (Santiago) - Eugenio Perdomo (1836-1863), writer
- Elupina Cordero de Las Cañitas (Hato mayor) – Elupina Cordero (1892–1939), Dominican catholic religious
- Emma Balaguer Viuda Vallejo (Azua) – Emma Balaguer Vallejo (1911–1992), Joaquín Balaguer's sister
- Espaillat Province – Ulises Francisco Espaillat, 19th-century author and President
- Fantino - Giovanni Fantino (1867-1939), Italian priest
- Franco Bidó (Santiago) - Juan Luis Franco Bidó (1807-1871), military
- Gaspar Hernández – Gaspar Hernández (priest), Peruvian priest
- Galván, Dominican Republic – Manuel de Jesús Galván (1834–1910), Dominican writer
- Hato Mayor del Rey - Charles V, Holy Roman Emperor
- Hermanas Mirabal Province – Mirabal sisters, women activists who opposed the dictatorship of Trujillo
- Hipólito Billini (Dajabon) - Dr. Hipólito Billini (1903-1965), Dominican lawyer
- Hostos – Eugenio María de Hostos, Puerto Rican educator and philosopher
- Imbert, Dominican Republic – José María Imbert, French-Dominican independence hero
- Isidro Martinez (Elias Piña) - Isidro Enrique Martinez (1912-1977), local citizen
- Jimaní – Cacique Ximani
- José Francisco Peña Gómez (Pedernales) – José Francisco Peña Gómez, Dominican lawyer and politician
- Juan de Herrera, Dominican Republic – Juan de Herrera (Spanish farmer)
- Juan Rodríguez (La Vega) – General Juan Rodriguez Garcia (1886–1960), Anti-Trujillo military and politician
- Loma de Cabrera – José Cabrera Gómez (1810–1884), Dominican independence hero
- Las Matas de Farfán – Bartolome Farfan de los Godos, Spanish merchant
- Luperón – Gregorio Luperón, Dominican general and statesman
- Mamá Tingó (Monte Plata) – Mamá Tingó, Dominican activist leader
- Manuel Bueno, Dajabon - Manuel Bueno Perez (1945-2003), Anti-Trujillo student and pamphleteer
- María Trinidad Sánchez Province – María Trinidad Sánchez, a female soldier in the wars of independence
- Mariano Cestero (Dajabon) - Mariano Antonio Cestero (1837-1909), writer
- Mella, Independencia – Matías Ramón Mella, independence hero
- Miches - General Eugenio Miches (1822-1885)
- Monción - General Benito Monción, Hero of the Dominican Restoration War
- Monseñor Nouel Province – Monseñor Adolfo Alejandro Nouel, Archbishop of Santo Domingo and President
- Monte Cristi, Dominican Republic - Jesus
- Padre Las Casas, Dominican Republic – Bartolomé de las Casas
- Pedro Brand – Peter Dorse Brand, Californian miner
- Pedro Santana, Dominican Republic – Pedro Santana, first President of Dominican Republic
- Pepillo Salcedo, Dominican Republic – General José Antonio Salcedo
- Pimentel, Dominican Republic – Pedro Antonio Pimentel, Hero of the Dominican Restoration War
- Presidente Don Antonio Guzmán Fernández (Duarte) – Antonio Guzmán Fernández, President of the Republic
- Ramón Santana – Ramón Santana (1801-1844), twin brother of Pedro Santana
- Salcedo, Dominican Republic – Francisco Antonio Salcedo (d.1881), Dominican independence hero
- San Antonio de Guerra – Anthony of Padua and Hernando Guerra (founder)
- San Cristóbal, Dominican Republic - Christopher Columbus
- San Francisco de Macorís - Saint Francis
- San Gregorio de Nigua - Pope Gregory I
- San José de Ocoa - Saint Joseph
- San Juan de la Maguana - John the Baptist
- San Pedro de Macorís - Saint Peter
- San Rafael del Yuma - Raphael (archangel)
- San Víctor - Pope Victor I
- Sánchez, Dominican Republic – Francisco del Rosario Sánchez
- Sánchez Ramírez Province – Juan Sánchez Ramírez, hero of the Battle of Palo Hincado (1808)
- Santiago Rodríguez Province – Santiago Rodríguez, an officer of the Dominican army in the Dominican War of Independence
- Santo Domingo – Saint Dominic
- Tenares - Olegario Tenares (1822-1907), Hero of the Dominican Restoration War
- Valverde Province – José Desiderio Valverde, President
- Verón-Punta Cana - Monsieur Bertrand Verón y Gramouth, French citizen
- Vicente Noble – General Vicente Noble (b.1791), Dominican independence hero
- Villa Altagracia - Our Lady of Altagracia
- Villa Elisa (Montecristi) - María Elisa Meyreles, founder
- Villa Garcia (Montecristi) - Federico de Jesús García de la Cruz (1835-1873), President
- Villa González – Manuel de Jesús González Estevez (1862–1912), founder
- Villa Isabela - Isabella I of Castile
- Villa Riva – Gregorio Riva (1833–1889), Dominican pioneer
- Villa Tapia – Doroteo Antonio Tapia (1844–1901), Hero of the Dominican Restoration War
- Villa Vásquez – Horacio Vásquez, President of the Dominican Republic

Former:

- Benefactor Province was the name of San Juan Province (Dominican Republic) – Rafael Trujillo
- Ciudad Trujillo was the name of Santo Domingo – Rafael Trujillo
- José Trujillo Valdez Province was the name of Peravia Province – José Trujillo Valdez (1864–1935), Rafael Trujillo's father
- Julia Molina Province was the name of María Trinidad Sánchez Province – Altagracia Julia Molina (1865–1964), Rafael Trujillo's mother
- Pacificador Province was the name of Duarte Province – Ulises Heureaux (Peacemaker)
- San Rafael Province was the name of Elías Piña Province – Rafael Trujillo
- Villa José Trujillo Valdez was the name of Villa Jaragua – José Trujillo Valdez
- Villa Julia Molina was the name of Nagua – Altagracia Julia Molina

=== Ecuador ===
- Alejandro Labaka (Orellana) – Alejandro Labaka (1920–1987), Spanish bishop
- Alejo Lascano (Manabí) - Alejo Lascano (1840–1904), Ecuadorian physician and surgeon
- Alfredo Baquerizo Moreno (town) – Alfredo Baquerizo Moreno, President of Ecuador
- Ángel Pedro Giler (Manabí) - Ángel Pedro Giler (1875–1946), farmer and benefactor
- Antonio Ante Canton – Antonio Ante (1771–1836), Ecuadorian Independence Hero
- Antonio Sotomayor (Los Ríos) - Colonel Antonio Sotomayor y Luna, military
- Atahualpa Canton – Atahualpa, King of Quito
- Bolívar Canton, Carchi – Simón Bolívar
- Bolívar Canton, Manabí – Simón Bolívar
- General Antonio Elizade – Antonio Elizalde Lamar (1795-1862), Ecuadorian military and politician
- Camilo Ponce Enríquez (parish) – Camilo Ponce Enriquez, president of Ecuador
- Carlos Julio Arosemena Monroy (Manabí) – Carlos Julio Arosemena Monroy
- Carlos Julio Arosemena Tola, Ecuador – Carlos Julio Arosemena Tola, president of Ecuador
- Cevallos – Pedro Fermín Cevallos (1812–1893), Ecuadorian Politician and Historian
- Coronel Marcelino Maridueña – Marcelino Maridueña Quesada (1798–1883)
- Durán, Ecuador – Sr. José Durán Maristany (1878–1956)
- El Empalme de Velasco Ibarra – José María Velasco Ibarra, president of Ecuador
- Eloy Alfaro Canton – Eloy Alfaro, President of Ecuador
- Echeandía – Manuel José de Echeandía (1783–1850), Ecuadorian independence hero
- Espejo Canton – Eugenio Espejo, Ecuadorian scientist
- Flavio Alfaro Canton – General Flavio Evaristo Alfaro (1865–1912)
- General Leónidas Plaza y Gutiérrez – Leónidas Plaza, President of Ecuador
- Girón Canton – Spanish captain Francisco Hernández Girón
- Gonzalo Pizarro Canton – Gonzalo Pizarro, Spanish conquistador and younger paternal half-brother of Francisco Pizarro
- Ines Arango (Orellana) – Ines Arango (1937–1987), Colombian missionary
- Isidro Ayora, Ecuador – Isidro Ayora
- Ibarra, Ecuador – Miguel de Ibarra y Mallea (1550–1608)
- Jaime Roldos, Pastaza and Jaime Roldos (Guayas) – Jaime Roldós Aguilera
- Julio Andrade (Carchi) – General Julio Andrade (1866–1912)
- Lauro Guerrero (Loja) – Lauro Guerrero Becerra (1873–1904), Ecuadorian military
- Leonidas Proaño (Yantzaza) – Leonidas Proaño (1910–1988), Bishop of Riobamba
- Mejía Canton – José Mejía Lequerica (1774–1813), Ecuadorian political figure
- Mera, Pastaza – Juan León Mera, writer
- Milton Reyes (El Oro) – Milton Alfredo Reyes (1939–1970), student leader
- Montalvo Canton – Juan Montalvo Ecuadorian author and essayist
- Montúfar Canton – Coronel Carlos de Montufar (1780–1816), Ecuadorian military
- Nuevo Rocafuerte – Vicente Rocafuerte, president of Ecuador
- Quevedo, Ecuador –Timoteo Quevedo Pozo (1813–1876), surveying
- Olmedo Canton, Loja – José Joaquín de Olmedo, president of Ecuador
- Olmedo Canton, Manabí – José Joaquín de Olmedo
- Pablo Sexto Canton – Pope Paul VI
- Pedro Carbo – Pedro Carbo Noboa, 19th-century politician, diplomat and writer from Guayaquil
- General Villamil – José de Villamil, Ecuadorian independence hero
- Pedro Moncayo Canton – Pedro Moncayo, journalist and politician
- Pedro Vicente Maldonado Canton and Maldonado (Carchi) – Pedro Vicente Maldonado, 18th-century Ecuadorian scientist
- Puerto Ayora - Isidro Ayora
- Puerto Baquerizo Moreno – Alfredo Baquerizo Moreno, president of Ecuador
- Puerto Francisco de Orellana – Francisco de Orellana
- Puerto López – Daniel Lopez (1848–1893), philanthropist
- Puerto Rodriguez (Sucumbios) – Coronel Luis Arsenio Rodríguez (1898–1977), Ecuadorian–Peruvian War hero
- Puerto Villamil – José de Villamil
- Rocafuerte – Vicente Rocafuerte, president of Ecuador
- Rumiñahui Canton – Rumiñawi (Inca warrior)
- San Juan Bosco Canton – John Bosco
- San Miguel de Salcedo – Manuel Antonio Salcedo y Legorburú (1829–1870), priest
- Simón Bolívar Canton and Puerto Bolivar (El Oro) – Simón Bolívar
- Sixto Durán Ballén (Manabí) - Sixto Durán Ballén, President of Ecuador
- Sucre Canton – Antonio José de Sucre
- Teniente Maximiliano Rodriguez (Loja) – Maximiliano Rodriguez Loaiza (1909–1941)
- Tobar Donoso (Tulcan) – Julio Tobar Donoso (1894–1981), minister of foreign affairs of Ecuador
- Tufiño (Carchi) – Luis Gabriel Tufiño (1880–1962), cartographer
- Urbina (Tulcan) – José María Urvina
- Urdaneta Canton – Luis Urdaneta Farias, a Venezuelan-Ecuadorian military figure
- Valencia – Gregorio Valencia, founder
- Wilfrido Loor Moreira (Manabí) - Wilfrido Loor Moreira (1892-1984), Ecuatorian historian

=== Egypt ===
- Alexandria – Alexander the Great
- El Mahmoudiyah – Muhammad Ali of Egypt
- Faiyum:
  - formerly named Arsinoe – Arsinoe II of Egypt
  - formerly named Ptolemais Euergetis – Ptolemy III Euergetes
- Ismailia – Isma'il Pasha
- Kafr El Sheikh – Sheikh Talha al-Tilmisani
- Port Fouad – Fuad I of Egypt
- Port Said – Sa'id of Egypt
- Port Tawfik – Tewfik Pasha
- Nasser, Egypt – Egyptian President Gamal Abdel Nasser
- Sadat City – Egyptian President Anwar Sadat
- Saint Catherine, Egypt – Catherine of Alexandria
- Sheikh Zayed City – Zayed bin Sultan Al Nahyan
- Sheikh Zuweid – Sheikh Zuweid commander of the Rashidun Islamic army who fought during the Muslim conquest of Egypt
- Victoria (neighborhood) – Queen Victoria

=== El Salvador ===
- Alegría, Usulután – Presbyter José Miguel Alegria (d.1859)
- Aguilares – Manuel Aguilar y Bustamante and his brothers Nicolas and Vicente Aguilar
- Bolívar, La Unión – Simón Bolívar
- Cabañas Department – José Trinidad Cabañas
- Carolina, San Miguel – Charles IV of Spain
- Ciudad Arce – Manuel José Arce, Salvadorian Independence hero
- Ciudad Barrios – General Gerardo Barrios, President of El Salvador
- Ciudad Romero (Jiquilisco) - Óscar Romero
- Col. Borja Moran (Ahuachapán) – Alfonso Borja Moran (1897–1986), Salvadorian deputy
- Col Francisco Gavidia (San Miguel) – Francisco Gavidia, Salvadorian writer
- Col. Isidro Menendez (San Salvador) and Menéndez (Santa Ana)– Isidro Menendez (1795–1858)
- Colón, La Libertad – Christopher Columbus
- Comunidad Farabundo Martí (Santa Ana) – Farabundo Martí, Salvadorian revolutionary
- Delgado, San Salvador – José Matías Delgado, Salvadorian Independence hero
- La Reina, Chalatenango – Guatemalan resident, Maria Reina
- Morazán Department – Francisco Morazán
- Santa Ana, El Salvador – Saint Anne
- Santiago de María – Santiago González (politician), President of El Salvador with his daughter Maria Concepción Gonzalez Fortis (1872–1943)
- San Antonio Pajonal – Antonio Gutiérrez y Ulloa
- San Cayetano Istepeque – Cayetano Molina, President of El Salvador
- San Fernando, Chalatenango – King Ferdinand VII of Spain
- San Fernando, Morazán – Ferdinand III of Castile
- San Francisco Menéndez – Francisco Menéndez, President of El Salvador
- San Francisco Morazán – Francisco Morazán
- San Gerardo – Gerardo Barrios, President of El Salvador
- San Ildefonso, San Vicente – Saint Ildephonsus of Toledo
- San Jorge, San Miguel – Jorge Meléndez, President of El Salvador
- San Luis La Herradura – Luis Chávez y González
- San Rafael, San Miguel – Rafael Zaldívar, President of El Salvador
- San Rafael Cedros – Rafael Zaldívar
- San Rafael Obrajuelo – Rafael Zaldívar
- San Ramón, Cuscatlán – Presbyter Ramon Garcia
- San Salvador, El Salvador – Jesus (the Christian Savior)
- San Vicente, El Salvador – Saint Vincent of Saragossa
- Segundo Montes, Morazán – Segundo Montes, a Jesuit priest and scholar at the Universidad Centroamericana "José Simeón Cañas"
- Victoria, Cabañas – Guadalupe Victoria, first President of Mexico
- Zaragoza, La Libertad – Emperor Caesar Augustus

=== Equatorial Guinea ===
- Bioko – Bioko Löpèlo Mëlaka, son of the King Möókáta
- Luba, Equatorial Guinea – Botuku Luba, who led a revolt against the Spanish in 1910
- Malabo – Malabo Lopelo Melaka
- Moka, Equatorial Guinea – King Möókáta (1798-1899)

=== Estonia ===
- Anna – Saint Anne
- Järva-Jaani – John the Baptist
- Juhkentali – Lorenz Jauch, local landowner
- Kadriorg – Catherine I of Russia
- Karlova – Carl Gustav von Krüdener, local landowner
- Katleri – the Kattler family, local landowners
- Klooga and Kloogaranna – the Klugen noble family, local landowners
- Koidula, Setomaa Parish - Lydia Koidula, poet
- Kolga-Jaani – John the Evangelist
- Kristiine – Christina, Queen of Sweden
- Maarja-Magdaleena – Mary Magdalene
- Maarjamäe – Maria Egorovna Tolstaya (1841-1895), wife of Anatol Orlov-Davydov
- Madise – Saint Matthias
- Manilaid and Manija – Magnus, Duke of Holstein
- Peetri – Peter Peter, an 18th-century local farmer
- Pildiküla – Feliks Pilt (1906–1979), founder of a local housing estate
- Pirita – Bridget of Sweden
- Suure-Jaani – John the Evangelist
- Tondi and Tondiraba – Jobst Dunte (1569-1615), Tallinn Burgermeister
- Tartu – possibly after Tharapita, God of Estonian mythology
- Valga (Latvian: Valka) – possibly after the de Walko (de Walco) family, local landowners

Former:

- Harju-Jaani was the name of Raasiku – John the Baptist
- Kingissepa was the name of Kuressaare – Viktor Kingissepp, Estonian revolutionary and communist

=== Eswatini (Swaziland) ===
- Mbabane – Chief Mbabane Kunene
- Piggs Peak – William Pigg (Early resident)

=== Ethiopia ===
- Debre Marqos – Saint Mark the Evangelist
- Habete Giorgis (Addis Adeba) – Habte Giyorgis Dinagde, Ethiopian military commander
- Lalibela – Gebre Mesqel Lalibela, Emperor of Ethiopia
- Mizan Teferi – Haile Selassie (Ras Tafari Makonnen), Emperor of Ethiopia
- Sheikh Hussein – Sheikh Hussein (saint), a 13th-century Somali Muslim proselytizer
- Waliso – son of Liban, Waliso, an Oromo clan

=== Finland ===
- Brahestad (Finnish: Raahe) – Per Brahe the Younger, Governor-General of Finland
- Fredrikshamn (Finnish: Hamina) – King Frederick I of Sweden
- Hermanni (Helsinki) (Swedish: Hermanstad) – Herman Standertskjöld-Nordenstam (1854–1934)
- Jakobstad (Finnish: Pietarsaari) – Jacob De la Gardie (The city was founded by his widow – Ebba Brahe)
- Kaarina (Swedish: Sankt Karins) – Catherine of Alexandria
- Kristinestad (Finnish: Kristiinankaupunki) – Queen Christina of Sweden
- Loviisa (Swedish: Lovisa) – Lovisa Ulrika, Queen of Sweden
- Mariehamn (Finnish: Maarianhamina) – Empress Maria Alexandrovna of Russia
- Mikkeli (Swedish: Sankt Michel) – Archangel Michael
- Ullanlinna (Swedish: Ulrikasborg) – Ulrika Eleonora, Queen of Sweden
- Vaasa (Swedish: Vasa) – King Gustav I of Sweden

=== France ===
- Albertville – Charles Albert of Sardinia
- Althen-des-Paluds – Jean Althen
- Amélie-les-Bains-Palalda – Maria Amalia of Naples and Sicily
- Apatou – Apatou (captain)
- Beaumont-le-Roger - Roger de Beaumont
- Bonrepos-Riquet – Pierre-Paul Riquet
- Brie-Comte-Robert – Robert I, Count of Dreux
- Broglie, Eure – François Marie de Broglie, 1st Duke of Broglie
- Bourg-Madame – Marie-Thérèse, Duchess of Angoulême
- Carla-Bayle – Pierre Bayle (1647–1706), philosopher and writer
- Champagne-Vigny – Alfred de Vigny
- Charleville-sous-Bois – Charles III, Duke of Lorraine
- Châtillon-Coligny – Gaspard de Coligny
- Chavaniac-Lafayette – Gilbert du Motier, Marquis de Lafayette
- Chilly-Mazarin – Cardinal Mazarin
- Colleville-Montgomery – Bernard Montgomery
- Crillon-le-Brave (the brave) – Louis des Balbes de Berton de Crillon
- Decazeville – Élie, duc Decazes, Prime Minister
- Descartes – René Descartes
- Diane-Capelle – Diane de Dommartin
- Domrémy-la-Pucelle – Joan of Arc, the Maid of Orléans
- Ducos, Martinique - Théodore Ducos
- Elisabethville (Yvelines) – Elisabeth of Bavaria, Queen of the Belgians
- Eugénie-les-Bains – Eugénie de Montijo
- Ferney-Voltaire – Voltaire
- Fitz-James – James FitzJames, 1st Duke of Berwick
- Flavigny-sur-Ozerain – possibly named after a Roman general Flavius
- Fleury, Aude - Jean Hercule de Rosset de Rocozels de Fleury, soldier
- Frédéric-Fontaine – named after Frederick I, Duke of Württemberg
- Grenoble (Latin: Gratianopolis) – Roman Emperor Gratian
- Guisanbourg – Jean Samuel Guisan
- Hastingues – John Hastings, 1st Baron Hastings
- Henrichemont – Henry IV of France
- Illiers-Combray - Marcel Proust, author of In Search of Lost Time
- Javouhey - Anne-Marie Javouhey
- Jullouville - Armand Jullou (1833-1913), real estate developer and local councillor
- Labastide-Murat - Joachim Murat
- Le Bignon-Mirabeau – Honoré Gabriel Riqueti, comte de Mirabeau
- La Louptière-Thénard – Louis Jacques Thénard
- Le Plessis-Trévise – Édouard Mortier, Duke of Treviso
- Les Pennes-Mirabeau – Honoré Gabriel Riqueti, comte de Mirabeau
- Levallois-Perret – Nicolas Levallois (1816–1879) and Jean-Jacques Perret
- Maisons-Laffitte – Jacques Laffitte
- Milly-Lamartine – Alphonse de Lamartine, poet and writer
- Mont-Louis – Louis XIV of France
- Papaïchton-Pompidouville – Georges Pompidou, President of France
- Philippsbourg – Philipp IV, Count of Hanau-Lichtenberg
- Place Léon-Blum (Paris) – Léon Blum, a French socialist politician
- Port-Jérôme-sur-Seine - Jérôme Bonaparte, youngest brother of Napoleon I
- Port-Louis, Morbihan - Louis XIII
- Quartier De Gaulle (Cayenne) – Charles de Gaulle
- Régina – Louis Athanase Theophane Régina (1868–1922)
- Richelieu, Indre-et-Loire – Cardinal Richelieu
- Saint-Amans-Soult – Jean-de-Dieu Soult, Prime Minister
- Saint-Laurent-du-Maroni – Auguste Baudin, Governor of French Guiana
- Saint-Léger-Vauban – Vauban
- Saint-Louis, Haut-Rhin – Louis XIV of France
- Saint-Michel-de-Montaigne – Michel de Montaigne
- Saint-Paterne-Racan – Honorat de Bueil, seigneur de Racan
- Schœlcher – Victor Schœlcher
- Terre-Natale - Marcel Arland, novelist of Terre-Natale
- Thorey-Lyautey – Hubert Lyautey
- Thury-Harcourt-le-Hom – Henri d'Harcourt, 1st Duke of Harcourt
- Tilleul-Dame-Agnès - Agnès Sorel
- Vendays-Montalivet – Jean-Pierre Bachasson, comte de Montalivet
- Vitry-le-François – Francis I of France

=== Gabon ===
- Bongoville – Omar Bongo, President of Gabon
- Lastoursville – François Rigail de Lastours
- Port-Gentil – Émile Gentil

=== Germany ===
- Augsburg (state of Bavaria) – Roman Caesar Augustus
- Brunswick (state of Lower Saxony) – Bruno, Duke of Saxony
- Charlottenburg (state of Berlin) – Princess Sophia Charlotte of Hanover, queen consort of King Frederick I of Prussia (est. 13th century, incorporated into Berlin on 1 October 1920)
- Cologne (state of North Rhine-Westphalia; German: Köln, Latin: Colonia Claudia Ara Agrippinensium, CCAA) – Roman Emperor Claudius and Agrippina the Younger, empress consort (lit. Claudian colony and sacrificial altar of the Agrippinensians)
- Constance (state of Baden-Württemberg; German: Konstanz) – Roman Emperor Constantius Chlorus
- Friedrichstadt (state of Berlin) – King Frederick I of Prussia (est. 1688, incorporated into Berlin on 1 January 1710)
- Hildesheim (state of Lower Saxony) – farmer Hildwin (landowner in the 10th century)
- Karlsruhe (state of Baden-Württemberg) – Margrave Charles III William, Margrave of Baden-Durlach
- Leverkusen (state of North Rhine-Westphalia) – pharmacist Carl Leverkus
- Ludwigsburg (state of Baden-Württemberg) – Eberhard Ludwig, Duke of Württemberg
- Ludwigshafen upon Rhine (state of Rhineland-Palatinate) – King Louis I of Bavaria
- Saarlouis (state of Saarland) – King Louis XIV of France
- Sankt Pauli (state of Hamburg) – (Saul) Paul of Tarsos
- Trier (state of Rhineland-Palatinate; Latin: Augusta Treverorum) – Augustus (lit. City of Augustus in the lands of the Treveri people)
- Wilhelmshaven (state of Lower Saxony) – King William I of Prussia, later also German Emperor (lit. William's harbour)

Former:

- Karl-Marx-Stadt (state of Saxony) was the name of Chemnitz – Karl Marx
- Stalinstadt (state of Brandenburg) was the name of Eisenhüttenstadt – Joseph Stalin

=== Georgia ===
- Agmashenebeli (Batumi) – David IV of Georgia
- Andriatsminda (Akhaltsikhe) – Saint Andrew
- Asatiani Settlement (Kutaisi) – Lado Asatiani, Georgian poet
- Atarbekovka (Abkhazia) – Georgi Atarbekov
- Bagrationi (Batumi) – Pyotr Bagration
- Chavchavadze Settlement (Kutaisi) – Ilia Chavchavadze
- Dedoplistsqaro, Tamariani (Lagodekhi) and Tamarisi – Queen Tamar of Georgia
- Eliatsminda (Akhaltsikhe) – Saint Elijah
- Filippovka (Akhalkalaki) – Filipp Makaradze, President of Georgia during the soviet era
- Gabashvili Hill (Kutaisi) – Revaz Gabashvili, Georgian writer and politician
- Georgiashvili (Tetritskaro) – Arsen Georgiashvili (1881–1906)
- Giorgitsminda (Sagarejo) – Saint George
- Iliatsminda (Signagi) – Ilia Chavchavadze
- Javakhishvili (Batumi) – Ivane Javakhishvili, one of the founding fathers of the Tbilisi State University
- Kalinino (Gardabani) – Mikhail Kalinin
- Kazbegi Municipality – Alexander Kazbegi, a Georgian writer
- Khimshiashvili (Batumi) – Sherip Khimshiashvili
- Kirov (Zugdidi), Kirovka (Marneuli) – Sergey Kirov
- Leselidze (town) – General Konstantin Leselidze, a Georgian Colonel-General and National hero
- Mikeltsminda (Akhaltsikhe) – Saint Michael
- Mtskheta – Mtskhetos, epic hero of Georgian mythology
- Myasnikiani (Akhalkalaki) – Aleksandr Myasnikyan, first Communist President of Armenia
- Nikoloz Baratashvili district (Rustavi) – Nikoloz Baratashvili
- Nikortsminda – Saint Nicholas
- Ninoshvili (Guria) and Ninoshvili (Samtredia) – Egnate Ninoshvili, a Georgian writer
- Ninotsminda – Saint Nino, an Equal to the Apostles and the Enlightener of Georgia
- Nutsubidze Plato (Tbilisi) – Shalva Nutsubidze
- Pirosmani (Dedoplistskaro) – Niko Pirosmani
- Rustaveli (Batumi) – Shota Rustaveli
- Saakadze (Gardabani) – Giorgi Saakadze, a Georgian politician and military commander
- Stepantsminda – Saint Stephen or a Georgian Orthodox monk named Stephan
- Shaumiani – Stepan Shahumyan, a Georgian revolutionary
- Shaumyanovka (Abkhazia) – Stepan Shahumyan
- Tamar (Batumi) – Queen Tamar of Georgia
- Tsereteli (Marneuli) – Akaki Tsereteli, Georgian poet
- Vakhtangisi (Gardabani) – King Vakhtang I of Iberia
- Vazha-Pshavela (Tbilisi) – Vazha-Pshavela, Georgian writer
- Vorontsovi (Tbilisi) – Mikhail Semyonovich Vorontsov
- Zhdanovakani (Ninotsminda) – Andrey Zhdanov
- Zhiuli Shartava district (Rustavi) – Zhiuli Shartava

Former:

- Gegechkori was the name of Martvili – Sasha Gegechkori
- Kazbegi was the name of Stepantsminda – Alexander Kazbegi
- Leningori was the name of Akhalgori – Vladimir Lenin
- Luxemburg was the name of Bolnisi – Rosa Luxemburg
- Macharadze was the name of Ozurgeti – Filipp Makaradze
- Mayakovsky was the name of Baghdati – Vladimir Mayakovsky
- Orjonikidze was the name of Kharagauli – Sergo Ordzhonikidze
- Staliniri was the name of Tskhinvali – Joseph Stalin
- Stalinisi was the name of Khashuri – Joseph Stalin
- Tskhakaya was the name of Senaki – Mikhail Tskhakaya (1865–1950)
- Tsulukidze was the name of Khoni – Alexander Tsulukidze

=== Ghana ===
- Christiansborg – King Christian IV of Denmark
- Gwolu – Gwollu (or Gbollu) Koro Limann
- Kofi Pare – Kofi Pare, a migrant cocoa farmer
- Queen Anne's Point – Anne, Queen of Great Britain
- Techiman – Nana Takyi Firi

=== Greece ===
- Agios Nikolaos – Saint Nicholas
- Alexandreia, Greece – Alexander the Great
- Alexandroupoli – King Alexander of Greece
- Aristotelis (municipality) – Aristotle, ancient philosopher
- Athanasios Diakos, Greece - Athanasios Diakos
- Athens – Athena
- Dimitrios Ypsilantis (municipality) – Demetrius Ypsilanti, a 19th-century leader of the Greek struggle for independence
- Dionysos, Greece – Dionysus, god of the grape harvest, winemaking and wine, of ritual madness, fertility
- Emmanouil Pappas (municipality) – Emmanouil Pappas, leader in the Greek War of Independence
- Eleftherios Venizelos, Crete – Eleftherios Venizelos
- Filippoi – Philip II of Macedon
- Georgioupoli – Prince George of Greece and Denmark
- Georgios Karaiskakis (municipality) – Georgios Karaiskakis, a leader of the Greek War of Independence
- Glaraki – George Glarakis (1789–1855)
- Gypareika (Athens) – Pavlos Gyparis, Greek army officer
- Gyzi – Nikolaos Gyzis
- Heraklion – Heracles
- Ion Dragoumis (municipality) – Ion Dragoumis, Greek diplomat and protagonist of the Macedonian Struggle
- Kountouriotika – President of Greece Pavlos Kountouriotis
- Kypriadou – Epameinondas Kypriadis (1888–1958)
- Ladopoulou, Patras – Evangelos G. Ladopoulos (1883–1966)
- Makrygianni, Athens – Yannis Makriyannis
- Megas Alexandros, Pella – Alexander the Great
- Nafplion – Nauplius
- Nikiforos Fokas – 10th century Byzantine Emperor Nikephoros II Phokas
- Nikolaos Skoufas (municipality) – Nikolaos Skoufas, a leader of the Greek independence movement
- Nikos Kazantzakis (municipality) – Nikos Kazantzakis, Greek writer
- Orestiada – Orestes
- Papagou – Marshal Alexandros Papagos
- Pavlos Melas (municipality) – Pavlos Melas, a Greek hero of Macedonian struggle
- Petroupoli – Petros A. Giannaros (1878–1828), founder of the newspaper Esperini
- Plastiras - General Nikolaos Plastiras
- Probonas – Dimitrios Probonas (1874–1949)
- Ptolemaida – Ptolemy I Soter
- Pythagoreio – Pythagoras
- Rigas Feraios (municipality) - Rigas Feraios, writer
- Santorini – Saint Irene
- Skagiopouleio – Panagiotis Skagiopoulos
- Theodoros Ziakas (municipality) – Theodoros Ziakas, a 19th-century leader of the Greek struggle for independence
- Thessaloniki – Thessalonike, sister of Alexander the Great
- Traianoupoli – Roman emperor Trajan
- Vironas – Lord Byron, English poet and writer, National hero of Greece
- Zografou – Ioannis Zografos (1844–1927)

=== Grenada ===
- Grenville, Grenada – George Grenville, Prime Minister of United Kingdom
- Victoria, Grenada – Queen Victoria
- Madame Pierre town — Named after the Wife of a planter called Pierre Philip
- Fedon's Camp — Named after Julien Fedon

=== Guatemala ===
- Aguilar Batres (Zacapa) – Raúl Aguilar Batres, Guatemalan civil engineer
- Aparicio (Suchitepéquez) – Francisca Aparicio de Barrios, First lady of Guatemala
- Asentamiento Mario Alioto (Guatemala) – Mario Alioto Lopez Sanchez (1973–1994), Guatemalan student who was killed during a protest
- Barberena – Lic. Jose Barberena, Guatemalan minister under President Justo Rufino Barrios
- Barrancas de Gálvez (San Marcos) – Mariano Gálvez
- Cabañas, Zacapa – José Trinidad Cabañas, a Honduran politician
- Ciudad Tecun Uman, San Marcos – Cacique Tecun Uman
- Ciudad Pedro de Alvarado (Jutiapa) – Pedro de Alvarado
- Colomba – María Colomba Barillas Robles (1875–1945), daughter of Manuel Barillas
- Col. Martinez de Lejarza (Guatemala) – Juan José Martínez de Lejarza (1785–1824)
- Col. Miguel Ángel Asturias (Quetzaltenango) – Miguel Ángel Asturias, Guatemalan diplomatic and writer
- Col. Monseñor Gerardi (Guatemala) and Comunidad Juan Gerardi (San Pedro Ayampuc) – Monseñor Juan José Gerardi Conedera
- Col. Perez Guisasola (Guatemala) – Enrique Perez Guisasola (1924–1951)
- Col. Ulises Rojas (Guatemala) – Ulises Rojas (1881–1959), botanist
- Comunidad Jacobo Árbenz Guzmán (Ixcán, El Quiché) - Jacobo Árbenz
- Comunidad Hermogenes Lopez (Chimaltenango) – Hermógenes López Coarchita
- Cooperativa Mario Mendez (Peten) – Mario Mendez Montenegro (1910–1965), political leader
- Chicacao – Francisco Chicajau, indigenous villager
- Fraijanes – Two Missioners Juan Milán y Juan Álvarez
- Francisco Vela (Retahuleu) – Ing. Francisco Vela (1859–1909), Guatemalan cartographer
- Fray Bartolomé de las Casas – 15th-century Spanish priest, bishop, and writer Bartolomé de las Casas
- Flores, El Petén – Cirlio Flores Estrada, a Guatemalan physician
- Flores Costa Cuca – José Felipe Flores, Physician and Maria Josefa Barrios y Aparicio "Maruca or Cuca" (1878–1959), daughter of Justo Rufino Barrios
- Galvez (Quetzaltenango) – Mariano Gálvez, Guatemalan Independence hero
- Granados, Baja Verapaz – former president Miguel García Granados
- Godinez (Sololá) – Juan Godínez, Spanish conquistador
- Jerez, Jutiapa – Máximo Jerez, a 19th-century Nicaraguan politician, lawyer and military leader
- Kaibil Balám (Quiche) – Kaybʼil Bʼalam, a 16th-century leader of the Mam people
- La Gomera, Escuintla – Antonio Peraza de Ayala y Rojas, conde de la Gomera
- La Reforma, San Marcos – Justo Rufino Barrios the reformer
- La Union Barrios (Baja Verapaz) – Justo Rufino Barrios
- Livingston, Guatemala – American jurist and politician Edward Livingston
- Los Ochoa (San Marcos) – Bonifacio Ochoa Barrios (1888–1964) and Victor Maria Ochoa Barrios (1872–1951)
- Melchor de Mencos – Sergeant Major, Melchor de Mencos y Barón de Berrieza (1715–1787)
- Modesto Méndez (Izabal) – Modesto Méndez (1801–1863), Guatemalan military
- Morazán, El Progreso – Francisco Morazán, a Central American leader
- Morales, Guatemala – Guatemalan Lawyer and colonel Próspero Morales
- Nuevo San Carlos – King Charles III of Spain
- Palencia, Guatemala – Don Matias de Palencia, Founder
- Parcelamiento Monseñor Romero (Suchitepéquez) - Saint Óscar Romero
- Puerto Barrios – Justo Rufino Barrios, President of Guatemala
- Quirio Cataño (Chiquimula) – Quirio Cataño, Spanish sculptor
- Recuerdo a Barrios (Quetzaltenango) – Justo Rufino Barrios
- San Carlos Sija – King Charles III of Spain
- San Jacinto, Chiquimula – Hyacinth of Poland, Bishop of Kraków
- San Joaquin (Alta Verapaz) – Saint Joachim
- San Jorge (Zacapa) – Jorge Ubico, president
- San Luis Jilotepeque – King Louis IX of France
- San Manuel Chaparrón - Manuel Estrada Cabrera, President
- San Miguel Dueñas – Don Miguel Dueñas, founder
- San Rafael La Independencia - Rafael Carrera, President
- Santa Catarina Barahona – Saint Catherine of Alexandria and Sancho de Barahona, Founder
- Santa Cruz Barillas, Santa Elena Barillas (Guatemala) – General Manuel Barillas, president of Guatemala
- Santa Lucía La Reforma – Saint Lucy and Justo Rufino Barrios the liberal reformer
- Santa Rosa Cuilapa – Rose of Lima
- Santo Domingo Suchitepéquez – Dominic of Guzman
- Willy Woods (Suchitepéquez) - William Hervey Woods (1931-1976), American catholic priest
- Zaragoza, Chimaltenango – Roman Emperor Caesar Augustus

=== Guinea ===
- Conakry - Cona, an influential local peasant and palm wine producer of the Baga people
- Dubréka - Soumba Toumany (1571-1657) (also known as King Dubréka)
- Kindia - King Ndia (or Manga Ndia), an influential local leader who ruled the area prior to French colonization

=== Guinea Bissau ===
- São Domingos (Guinea-Bissau) – Saint Dominic of Guzman
- São Vicente, Guinea-Bissau – Vincent of Saragossa

=== Guyana ===
- Anna Regina – Anne, Queen of Great Britain
- Buxton, Guyana – Fowell Buxton
- Esau and Jacob - Jacob and Esau, twins in the Bible
- Campbelltown, Guyana – Stephen Campbell, first Amerindian member of Parliament in Guyana
- Fort Wellington, Guyana – Arthur Wellesley, 1st Duke of Wellington
- Georgetown – King George III of the United Kingdom
- Jonestown – Jim Jones, American religious and cult leader
- Lethem – Sir Gordon James Lethem
- Linden, Guyana – Linden Forbes Burnham Sampson, a Prime Minister and President of Guyana
- Matthews Ridge, Guyana – Matthew Young (1905–1996)
- Port Mourant - Stephen Mourant, who founded the cotton plantation
- Queenstown, Guyana – Queen Victoria
- Stabroek, Guyana – Nicholaas Geelvinck, Lord of Stabroek, and President of the Dutch West India Company
- Stewartville, Guyana – John Stewart (1789–1860)
- Victoria, Guyana – Queen Victoria

=== Haiti ===
- André, Ouest – André Rigaud
- Bombardopolis – Pierre-Paul Bombarda (1698–1783), benefactor
- Cabral (Thomonde) - José María Cabral
- Dessalines – Jean-Jacques Dessalines, a leader of the Haitian Revolution and the first ruler of independent Haiti
- Dr. François Duvalier (Hinche) – François Duvalier
- Cite Simone (Port-au-Prince) – Simone Duvalier, First lady of Haiti
- Ennery, Artibonite – Victor-Thérèse Charpentier, marquis of Ennerry, Governor General of Saint-Domingue
- Ferrier, Haiti - named for a former landowner
- Ganthier - named for a prominent mulatto rancher, farmer, and landowner
- Gressier – Edmond Valléry Gressier
- Jacmel - Jacques de Mélo, a French settler
- Justin, Ouest – Justin Lhérisson, Haitian writer, lawyer, journalist, and teacher
- Killick Stenio Vincent (Port-au-Prince) – Sténio Vincent, President of Haiti
- Leclerk Bidonville (Port-au-Prince) – Charles Leclerc (general), a French Army general
- Louverture, (Pétion-ville) – Toussaint Louverture
- Morne Boyer (Haiti) – Jean-Pierre Boyer, leader of the Haitian Revolution
- Nan Lavaud (Ouest) – Franck Lavaud
- Ouanaminthe – Juana Mendez (1788–1873), mother of Buenaventura Báez, a Dominican president
- Pétion-Ville – Alexandre Sabès Pétion, President of Haiti
- Simon (Sud) – Tirésias Simon Sam
- Simone (Dessalines) – Simone Duvalier
- Thomas, Ouest – Thomas Madiou
- Village Lamothe (Port-au-Prince) – Dr. Louis G. Lamothe (1926–1999), philanthropist
- Village Lumane Casimir (Haiti) – Lumane Casimir (1920–1955), Haitian singer

Former:

- Cite Simone was the name of Cité Soleil – Simone Duvalier
- Duvalierville was the name of Cabaret, Ouest – François Duvalier and Jean-Claude Duvalier

=== Honduras ===
- Alfonso XIII (Santa Barbara) – Alfonso XIII of Spain
- Asentamiento Juan Benito Montoya (Copan) – Juan Benito Montoya, peasant leader who was killed in Los Horcones in 1975
- Barrio Paz Barahona (Cortes) – Miguel Paz Barahona
- Cabañas, Copán –José Trinidad Cabañas, President of Honduras
- Cabañas (Danli) – José Trinidad Cabañas
- Cabañas, La Paz – General José Trinidad Cabañas
- Col. Alfonso Guillen (Yoro) – Alfonso Guillen Zelaya (1887–1947), Honduran Poet
- Col. Alfonso Lacayo (Cortes) – Alfonso Lacayo (1923–1985), Garifuna physician
- Col. Amaya Amador (Yoro) – Ramón Amaya Amador, Honduran author
- Col. Francisco J. Mejía (Yoro) – Francisco J. Mejía, Honduran teacher
- Col. Francisco Murillo Soto (Yoro) – Prof. Francisco Murillo Soto (1893–1982)
- Col. Jacobo V. Carcamo (Yoro) – Jacobo Carcamo (1916–1959), Honduran Poet
- Col. Jesús Aguilar Paz (Tegucigalpa) – Jesús Aguilar Paz, Honduran Chemist
- Col. Medardo Mejia (Olancho) – Medardo Mejia (1907–1981), Honduran poet
- Col. Rodas Alvarado (Ocotepeque) – Modesto Rodas Alvarado, President of the National Congress
- Col. Terencio Sierra (Cortes) – Terencio Sierra
- Col. Víctor F. Ardón (Tegucigalpa) – Víctor F. Ardón (1896–1976), Honduran educator
- Froylán Turcios (Olancho) – Froylán Turcios, Honduran Poet
- Guadalupe Carney (Colon) – James Carney (American priest), also known as Father Guadalupe Carney
- Grupo Villeda Morales (Atlantida) – Ramón Villeda Morales
- Juan Francisco Bulnes – Juan Francisco Bulnes (1808–1878), Garifuna soldier
- Jesús de Otoro – Fray Juan Félix de Jesús Zepeda y Zepeda (1808–1885), bishop of Comayagua
- José Santos Guardiola –José Santos Guardiola, President of Honduras
- Kennedy (Tegucigalpa) – John F. Kennedy, American President
- Marcovia – Marco Aurelio Soto, President of Honduras
- Marcelino Champagnat (Choluteca) – Saint Marcellin Champagnat
- Melgar Castro (Marcala, La Paz) – Juan Alberto Melgar Castro, former Head of State of Honduras
- Monseñor Fiallos (Tegucigalpa) – Monseñor Ernesto Fiallos (1857–1946), Honduran priest
- Morazán, Yoro – Francisco Morazán, Honduran liberal politician
- Policarpo Paz García (Yoro) – Policarpo Paz García
- Puerto Cortés – Hernán Cortés, Spanish Conquistador
- Puerto Lempira – cacique Lempira
- Ramón Villeda Morales (municipality) – Ramón Villeda Morales, President of Honduras
- Rodas Alvarado (Danli) – Modesto Rodas Alvarado, Honduran lawyer
- San Esteban, Olancho – Fray Esteban Verdelete
- San Francisco, Atlántida – Francisco Matute, Benefactor of the town.
- San Francisco del Valle – Saint Francis
- San Jerónimo, Copán – Lic. Jerónimo J.Reina (1876–1918), Honduran poet and journalist
- San Jorge, Ocotepeque – Saint George
- San Luis, Comayagua – King Louis IX of France
- San Pedro Sula – Saint Peter
- Santa Rosa de Aguán – Saint Rose of Lima
- Villeda Morales (Danli) – Ramón Villeda Morales

=== Hungary ===
- Abasár – King Sámuel Aba of Hungary
- Adyváros – Endre Ady
- Albertfalva - Albert Casimir, Duke of Teschen
- Ambrózfalva – Baron Lajos Ambrózy (1803–1890)
- Antalhegy – Antal Grassalkovich
- Árpádhalom – Árpád, father of the Hungarian fatherland
- Balatonmáriafürdő - Maria Alexandra von Sztáray-Szirmay (1843–1914), wife of Count Imre Széchenyi
- Baross Gábor-telep - Gábor Baross
- Beloiannisz - Nikos Beloyannis
- Benczúrfalva (Szécsény) – Gyula Benczúr, Painter
- Bocskaikert – Stephen Bocskay, aristocrat
- Cholnokyváros – Jenő Cholnoky (1870–1950)
- Császártöltés - Leopold I, Holy Roman Emperor
- Egry József uctai Iakotelep (Veszprém) - József Egry
- Éhen Gyula-lakótelep – Gyula Éhen (1853–1932)
- Erzsébetváros – Queen Elisabeth of Bavaria
- Felsőszentiván - John the Baptist
- Ferencszállás – Baron Ferenc Gerliczy (1748–1833)
- Ferencváros – Francis II, Holy Roman Emperor
- Harkakötöny – Kötöny
- Hunyadfalva – Hunyady family
- Izsófalva – Miklós Izsó, sculptor
- Jakabszállás - James the Great
- Jánoshalma – John Hunyadi, commander
- Józsefváros – Joseph II, Holy Roman Emperor
- József Attila lakótelep (Budapest) – Attila József
- Kálmánháza - Kálmán Tisza
- Károlyháza - Archduke Charles Stephen of Austria
- Katonatelep – Zsigmond Katona (1828–1902)
- Kecskés István-telep - István Kecskés (1880-1944), municipal officer
- Klárafalva - Clare of Assisi
- Klebelsberg-telep - Kuno von Klebelsberg
- Kossuthfalva (Budapest) – Lajos Kossuth, Governor-President of Hungary
- Krepuska Géza-telep – Géza Krepuska
- Krisztinaváros (Budapest) – Archduchess Maria Christina
- Kossuth Ferenc-telep - Ferenc Kossuth
- Kübekháza - Karl Friedrich von Kübeck (1780-1855), Austrian statesman
- Lajoskomárom - Lajos Batthyány
- Lipótváros (Budapest) – Leopold II
- Máriahalom - Mary, mother of Jesus
- Mihályfa - Saint Michael
- Mihályháza - Mihály Keszeg (landowner)
- Nyírtass – Tas, grandson of Árpád
- Petőfibánya – Sándor Petőfi, poet
- Petőfiszállás – Sándor Petőfi
- Rákóczibánya – Francis II Rákóczi, Hungarian National hero
- Rákóczifalva – Francis II Rákóczi
- Rákócziújfalu – Francis II Rákóczi
- Rudolftelep – Rudolf Cohacht, Hungarian miner
- Sándorfalva – Viscount Sándor Pallavicini (1853–1933), founder
- Solt – Solt
- Soltszentimre - Saint Emeric of Hungary
- Szalkszentmárton - Martin of Tours
- Szentantalfa - Anthony of Padua
- Szentbékkálla - Benedict of Nursia
- Szentdénes - Denis of Paris
- Szentdomonkos - Saint Dominic of Guzmán, Spanish Catholic priest
- Szentendre - Saint Andrew
- Szentgotthárd - Gotthard of Hildesheim, German bishop of Hildesheim
- Szentkatalin - Catherine of Alexandria
- Szentliszló - Ladislaus I of Hungary
- Szentlőrinc - Saint Lawrence
- Szentpéterfa - Saint Peter
- Szentistván - Stephen I of Hungary
- Széchenyiváros (Kecskemét) - István Széchenyi
- Taksony – Taksony of Hungary
- Tass – Tas, grandson of Árpád
- Terézváros – Queen Maria Theresa
- Tiborszállás – Tibor Károlyi, Hungarian politician
- Törökbálint – Bálint Török
- Újlipótváros (Budapest) – Leopold II
- Újlőrincfalva - Cardinal Lőrinc Schlauch (1824-1902)
- Üllő – Üllő, son of Árpád
- Vasszentmihály - Saint Michael
- Veres Péter-kert (Debrecen) - Péter Veres (politician)
- Zalaszentgrót – Gerard Sagredo

Former:

- Koháryszentlőrinc was the name of Nyárlőrinc – Koháry family
- Leninváros was the name of Tiszaújváros – Vladimir Lenin
- Prónayfalva was the name of Tázlár – Prónay family
- Sztálinváros was the name of Dunaújváros – Joseph Stalin

=== Iceland ===
- Grímsey – Grími Ingjaldsson, who have a winter residence in their island
- Ólafsfjörður – Ólafur Bekkur Karlsson

=== India ===
- Abhimanyupur - Abhimanyu
- Adityapur – a city and a part of Jamshedpur was named after Raja Aditya Pratap Singh Deo (1887–1969).
- Ahmedabad – Sultan Ahmed Shah
- Ahmednagar – Malik Ahmad Nizam Shah I, Nizam Shahi dynasty
- Alluri Sitharama Raju district – Alluri Sitarama Raju
- Ambedkar Nagar – B. R. Ambedkar
- Ambedkar Nagar district – B. R. Ambedkar, Father of the Indian Constitution
- Amroha (Jyotiba Phule Nagar) – Jyotiba Phule
- Annamalai Nagar – S. Rm. M. Annamalai Chettiar
- Annamayya district – Annamacharya
- Ashoknagar Kalyangarh – Ashoke Kumar Sen
- Atal Nagar Nava Raipur – Atal Bihari Vajpayee
- Aurangabad – Aurangazeb (Mughal emperor)
- Bardhaman – 24th and the last Tirthankar-Vardhaman Mahavir
- Bodh Gaya – Buddha
- Bikaner – Maharaja Rao Bika Singh Ji
- Bhadani Nagar – Lala Gurusharan Lal Bhadani
- Chamoli district – Shiva, one of the principal deities of Hinduism.
- Chandigarh – Goddess Chandi
- Chennai – Chennappa Naicker
- Churachandpur – Maharaja Sir Churachand Singh
- CV Raman Nagar – a neighbourhood in Bangalore named after C. V. Raman
- Dalhousie – James Broun-Ramsay, 1st Marquess of Dalhousie
- Dr. Ambedkar Nagar – B. R. Ambedkar
- Faridabad – Shaikh Farid Bukhari
- Faridkot, Punjab – Fariduddin Ganjshakar
- Firozpur – Firuz Shah Tughlaq
- Gajapati district – Krushna Chandra Gajapati
- Gandhinagar – Mahatma Gandhi
- Gangaikonda Cholapuram – Rajendra Cholan, alias GangaiKondaCholan (Conqueror of the Ganges), a Chola dynasty emperor
- Gautam Budh Nagar district – Buddha
- Ghaziabad – Wazir Ghazi-un-ddin, the minister of Ahmad Shah Bahadur (Moghul Emperor)
- Haridwar – Vishnu (Hari)
- Hyderabad – Hyder Mahal, wife of Quli Qutub Shah.
- Indira Point – Indira Gandhi, Prime Minister of India
- Jamshedpur, also called Tata Nagar – Jamshetji Tata
- Jaipur – Maharaja Sawai Jai Singh Ji
- Jodhpur – Maharaja Rao Jodha Singh Ji
- Jogindernagar – Joginder Sen
- Kabisuryanagar – Kabisurjya Baladeba Ratha
- Komaram Bheem district – Komaram Bheem, a Gond martyr
- Krishnarajapuram – a suburb and neighbourhood in Bangalore named after Krishnaraja Wadiyar III
- Lucknow – Lakshmana, a hero of the ancient Hindu epic Ramayana
- Mahendragarh – Mahendra Singh of Patiala
- Mangalore – Mangala Devi, Mangaladevi Temple
- Margherita, Assam – Margherita of Savoy
- Meherabad – Meher Baba
- Modinagar – Gujarmal Modi
- Moradabad – prince Murad
- Mumbai – Mumbadevi
- Nampally, Hyderabad- A Persian Diwan of Hyderabad State, Raza Ali Khan whose title was Nekh-Nam-Khan.
- Nizamabad City, Nizamabad district – Nizam-ul-Mulk, Asaf Jah I
- NTR district – N. T. Rama Rao, Chief Minister of Andhra Pradesh
- Osmanabad – Mir Osman Ali Khan
- Pandit Deen Dayal Upadhyaya Nagar – Deendayal Upadhyaya
- Palitana – Jain Acharya Padlipta Suri
- Parashurampuri, Shahjahanpur - Parashurama
- Patel Nagar – Vallabhbhai Patel, 1st deputy Prime minister of India
- Pithoragarh – Prithviraj Chauhan
- Port Blair – Archibald Blair
- R. T. Nagar – Rabindranath Tagore
- Rajendranagar mandal – Rajendra Prasad, President of India
- Rajgurunagar – Shivaram Rajguru
- Ramachandrapuram – Raja Kakarlapudi Rama Chandra Raju
- Ranga Reddy district – K. V. Ranga Reddy
- Rishabhdeo – First Tirthankar – Rishabha (Adinath)
- Robertsganj – Frederick Roberts, 1st Earl Roberts
- Sahibzada Ajit Singh Nagar district – Ajit Singh (Sikhism)
- Sant Kabir Nagar district – Sant Kabir, poet
- Santhome – locality in Mylapore, named after the Apostle, Saint Thomas
- Secunderabad – Named after Sikandar Jah, the third Nizam of the Asaf Jahi dynasty
- Shaheed Bhagat Singh Nagar district – Bhagat Singh, Indian National Hero
- Shimla – Goddess Shyamala, an incarnation of Hindu deity Kali
- Sri Ganganagar – General Sir Ganga Singh, the Maharajah of Bikaner State from 1888 to 1943
- Sant Hirda Ram Nagar, Bhopal - Sant Hirdaram Saheb (1906–2006)
- Sri Sathya Sai district – Sathya Sai Baba, Indian guru
- Surendranagar Dudhrej – Surendrasinhji Jorawarsinhji (1922–1983), Ruler of Wadhwan state
- Sri Potti Sriramulu Nellore – Potti Sreeramulu, Indian revolutionary
- Tuljapur – Goddess Tulja Bhavani Temple
- Udaipur – Maharana Udai Singh II
- Udham Singh Nagar district – freedom fighter and Indian revolutionary Udham Singh
- Vasco da Gama – Vasco da Gama
- Visakhapatnam – ruled by King Visakha Varma
- Vizianagaram – Raja Pusapati Vijaya Rama Raju (Gajapathi Clan)
- Vallathol Nagar – Vallathol Narayana Menon, Malayalam poet
- Williamnagar – Williamson A. Sangma, the founding Chief Minister of Meghalaya
- Willingdon Island – large artificial island in Kochi, named after Lord Willingdon
- Wellington – town in The Nilgiris District of Tamil Nadu, named after the Iron Duke

=== Indonesia ===
- Airlangga, Gubeng, Surabaya – Airlangga, king of Kediri Kingdom
- Desa Yani Pura (South Kalimantan) - General Ahmad Yani, revolutionary hero and army commander
- Dr. Soetomo, Tegalsari, Surabaya – Soetomo, founder of Budi Utomo
- Halim Perdana Kusumah, Makasar, Jakarta – Halim Perdanakusuma – Indonesian airman and national hero
- Hatta, Bakauheni, Lampung – Mohammad Hatta, 1st Vice President of Indonesia
- Kartini, Sawah Besar, Jakarta – Kartini, Javanese women's rights figure
- Port of Soekarno-Hatta – Sukarno and Mohammad Hatta, proclaimers of Indonesian independence
- Setiabudi, Jakarta – Ernest Douwes Dekker, known as Danoedirdja Setiaboedi, national hero of Indonesia
- Sudirman, Tanralili, Maros, South Sulawesi – Sudirman, Indonesian military officer

Former:

- Sukarnopura was the name of Jayapura – Sukarno, 1st President of Indonesia

=== Iran ===
- Abbasabad County - Abbas Mirza
- Ahmadabad-e Mosaddeq – Mohammad Mosaddegh
- Amadegah Shahid Mohammad Montazeri – Mohammad Montazeri
- Amiriyeh - Amir Kabir
- Apamea (Media) – Apama, mother of Antiochus I Soter
- Apamea Ragiana – a royal woman named Apama among the Seleucids
- Bandar-Abbas – Shah Abbas I
- Bandar-e Emam Khomeyni – Ruhollah Khomeini a Supreme leader, philosopher, revolutionary, and politician
- Hamidaniyeh – Mir Sayyid Ali Hamadani, 14th century Poet and Scholar
- Hasanabad, Tehran – Mostowfi ol-Mamalek, Prime Minister of Iran
- Jammi – 15th century Persian Poet Abdurahman Jami
- Kabak Mohammad Reza – Mohammad Reza Pahlavi, last king
- Kermanshah – King Bahram IV
- Khomeyni Shahr – Ruhollah Khomeini
- Masjed Soleyman – Solomon, a major prophet of Islam
- Nahavand:
  - formerly named Laodicea – Laodice of Macedonia
  - formerly named Antiochia – Antiochus I Soter
- Naser Khosrow, Iran – Nasir Khusraw an 11th-century poet
- Parsabad – engineer Ibrahim Parsa (1905–1996), founder of Parsabad
- Piranshahr – Piran, son of Viseh
- Rezaiyeh, Razavi Khorasan – Reza Shah Pahlavi
- Rudaki, Iran – Rudaki, Persian poet
- Seleucia (Susiana) – Seleucus I Nicator
- Seleucia (Susiana) – a Seleucus of the Seleucid dynasty
- Shahid Beheshti, Iran - Mohammad Beheshti
- Shahrak-e Ayatollah Madani – Mir Asadollah Madani, Iranian politician
- Susa, formerly named Seleucia – Seleucus I Nicator
- Yusef Abad – Mirza Yusef Ashtiani (1813–1887)

Former:

- Bandar-e Pahlavi was the name of Bandar-e Anzali – Reza Shah Pahlavi
- Rezā'īyeh was the name of Urmia – Reza Shah Pahlavi

=== Iraq ===
- Adhamiyah – Abu Hanifa (al-Imām al-Aʿẓam), founder of the prominent Sunni Hanafī school of Islamic religious jurisprudence
- Al-Aziziyah – Abdülaziz, Ottoman Sultan
- Al-Sadiyah – Sa`d ibn Abi Waqqas, commander who led the Arabs to conquer Mesopotamia from the Sasanian Empire
- Antiochia in Sittacene – Antiochus I Soter
- Apamea (Babylonia) – a royal woman named Apama among the Seleucids
- Apamea (Sittacene) – Apama, mother of Antiochus I Soter
- Camp Ashraf – Ashraf Rabiei, Iranian guerrilla and wife of Massoud Rajavi
- Charax Spasinu:
  - formerly named Alexandria – Alexander the Great
  - formerly named Antiochia in Susiana – Antiochus IV
  - formerly named Charax of Hyspaosines – Hyspaosines
- Hamza – Bahraini Shia cleric "Ahmad Ibn Hashim Al-Ghurifi" (a.k.a. Hamza)
- Al Hashimiyah – Named after the Hashemites
- Al-Hindiya – "Asaf-ud-Daula Al-Hindi", who was a vizier of Bahadur Shah Zafar
- Iskandariya – Alexander the Great
- Kadhimiya – Musa al-Kadhim
- Laodicea (Mesopotamia) – a royal woman named Laodice among the Seleucids
- Al Midhatiya – Midhat Pasha
- Nasiriyah – "Nasir al-Saadun Pasha" (1810–1885), the sheikh ("chief") of the Muntafiq tribal confederation
- Al Numaniyah – al-Nu'man III ibn al-Mundhir
- Al-Qasim – "Al-Qasim" son of Musa al-Kadhim
- Sadr City – Mohammad Mohammad Sadeq al-Sadr
- Seleucia – Seleucus I Nicator
- Seleucia (Sittacene) – Seleucus I Nicator
- Sulaymaniyah – Sulaiman Baba, the first Baban prince to gain control of the province of Shahrizor and its capital, Kirkuk
- Yusufiyah – Yūsuf (Joseph)
- Az Zubayr – Zubayr ibn al-Awwam

Former:

- Saddam City was the name of Sadr City - Saddam Hussein

=== Ireland (Republic of) ===
- Bagenalstown – Lord Walter Bagenal
- Bellewstown – Darren Bellew
- Binghamstown – Major Denis Bingham (1765–1842)
- Canningstown – George Canning, 1st Baron Garvagh
- Charlestown – Charles Strickland (1818–1892), Land Agent and Town Planner
- Charleville, County Cork – Charles II of England
- Connacht – Conn Cétchathach
- County Kerry – Ciar
- Dún Laoghaire – Lóegaire mac Néill
- Edgeworthstown – the Anglo-Irish Edgeworth family, such as Henry Essex Edgeworth de Firmont, local rector, Francis Ysidro Edgeworth, economist, Michael Pakenham Edgeworth, botanist, Richard Lovell Edgeworth, politician, and Maria Edgeworth, writer
- Enniskean – "island of Cian", Cian Maol Muadh (O'Mahony) of Cork
- Jamestown, County Leitrim – James VI and I
- Knightstown, County Kerry – Maurice FitzGerald, 18th Knight of Kerry
- Louisburgh, County Mayo – Louis XIV of France
- Rochfortbridge, County Westmeath – Robert Rochfort
- Virginia, County Cavan – Queen Elizabeth I of England

Former:

- Maryborough was the name of Portlaoise – Mary I of England
- Philipstown was the name of Daingean – Philip II of Spain
- Kingwilliamstown was the name of Ballydesmond – William IV of the United Kingdom
- Queenstown was the name of Cobh – Queen Victoria

=== Israel ===
==== Central District ====
- Beit Berl - Berl Katznelson
- Beit Elazari - Yitzhak Elazari Volcani
- Beit HaLevi - Judah Halevi
- Beit Hazon - Avrohom Yeshaya Karelitz
- Beit Yanai - Alexander Jannaeus
- Beit Yehoshua - Ozjasz Thon
- Binyamina-Giv'at Ada - Edmond James de Rothschild
- Ganei Yohanan - Yohanan Kreminitsky, Zionist leader
- Givat Brenner – Yosef Haim Brenner
- Givat Shapira – Hermann Schapira
- Givat Washington - George Washington
- Givat Yeshayahu - Yeshayahu Press
- Karmei Yosef - Yosef Sapir
- Kfar Daniel - Daniel Frish (1897–1950), president of the Zionist Organization of America
- Kfar Haim – Haim Arlosoroff
- Kfar Hess – Moses Hess
- Kfar Haroeh - Abraham Isaac Kook
- Kfar Malal - Moshe Leib Lilienblum
- Kfar Mordechai - Mordechai Eliash
- Kfar Monash - John Monash
- Kfar Netter – Charles Netter
- Kfar Shmuel – Stephen Samuel Wise
- Kfar Sirkin – Nachman Syrkin
- Kfar Truman – Harry S. Truman
- Kfar Vitkin – Yosef Vitkin
- Kfar Warburg – Felix M. Warburg
- Kfar Yavetz – Ze'ev Yavetz
- Kfar Yedidia - Philo
- Kokhav Ya'ir–Tsur Yig'al - Avraham Stern and Yigal Cohen
- Mazkeret Batya - Betty von Rothschild
- Mishmar David – Mickey Marcus
- Netanya – Nathan Strauss
- Neve Michael - Michael M. Weiss, American philanthropist
- Ramat Raziel - David Raziel
- Tzur Yitzhak – Yitzhak Rabin, Israeli prime minister who was assassinated in 1995
- Yad Binyamin - Binyamin Mintz
- Yad Hana - Hannah Szenes
- Talmei Yehiel - Yechiel Chelnov (1863-1918), a Russian Zionist leader

==== Haifa District ====
- Gan Shmuel - Samuel Mohilever
- Kiryat Motzkin - Leo Motzkin
- Lehavot Haviva - Haviva Reik
- Mitzpe Ilan - Ilan Ramon, Israeli astronaut
- Pardes Hanna-Karkur - Hannah Primrose, Countess of Rosebery
- Qiryat Bialik – writer Hayyim Nahman Bialik

==== Jerusalem District ====
- Kfar Zoharim - Zohar Argov
- Kiryat Wolfson – Isaac Wolfson
- Kiryat Shmuel, Jerusalem – Shmuel Salant, the Ashkenazi Chief Rabbi of Jerusalem
- Neve Granot – Avraham Granot, Signatory of the Israeli Declaration of Independence
- Neve Yaakov – Yitzchak Yaacov Reines
- Ramat Eshkol – Levi Eshkol, Prime Minister of Israel
- Ramat Sharett – Moshe Sharett, Prime Minister of Israel
- Ramat Shlomo – Shlomo Zalman Auerbach

==== Northern District ====
- Acre, formerly named Antiochia Ptolemais – Alexander the Great's generals Antiochus and Ptolemy Soter
- Alonei Abba - Abba Berdichev (1920-1945)
- Alonei Yitzhak - Yitzhak Gruenbaum
- Ashdot Ya'akov - James de Rothschild (politician)
- Balfourya – Arthur James Balfour, British Prime Minister
- Bat Shlomo - Betty von Rothschild
- Beit Hanania - Dr. Robert Gottlieb Hananya, a leader of the Palestine Jewish Colonization Association
- Hippos, formerly named Antiochia Hippos – an Antiochus of the Seleucid dynasty
- Kerem Maharal - Maharal Judah Loew ben Bezalel
- Kfar Baruch - Baruch Kahane (1835–1927), Jewish philanthropist
- Kfar Blum - Léon Blum
- Kfar Giladi - Israel Giladi (1886-1918), one of the founders of the Hashomer movement
- Kfar Glikson - Moshe Glickson (1878–1939), editor of Haaretz newspaper
- Kfar HaNassi - Chaim Weizmann, first President of Israel
- Kfar Kisch - Frederick Kisch
- Kfar Masaryk – Tomáš Garrigue Masaryk
- Kfar Pines - Yechiel Michel Pines
- Kfar Tzvi Sitrin - Howard Sitrin (1924-1949), a leader of Hapoel HaMizrachi in the United States
- Kfar Yehoshua - Yehoshua Hankin
- Kiryat Shmona - Eight Jewish militiamen who died in a Battle of Tel Hai of 1920
- Ma'agan Michael - Michael Pollack, founder of the Nesher cement plant
- Margaliot - Haim Margaliot-Kalvarisky (1868-1947)
- Meir Shfeya - Amschel Mayer Rothschild
- Nir David - David Wolffsohn
- Ramat David - David Lloyd George
- Ramat Yohanan - Jan Smuts, South African Premier
- Sde Eliezer – Robert Rothschild
- Sde Eliyahu – 19th-century Rabbi Eliyahu Guttmacher
- Sde Nehemia – Nehemia de Lieme
- Sde Nitzan - Louis Bloomfield and Bernard Bloomfield (1904-1984)
- Sde Ya'akov - Yitzchak Yaacov Reines
- Sde Yitzhak - Yitzhak Sadeh
- Seleucia Samulias – a Seleucus among the Seleucid dynasty
- Shadmot Dvora - Dorothy de Rothschild
- Talmei Elazar - Elazar Warmassar, one of the heads of the PJCA
- Tel Yosef - Joseph Trumpeldor
- Tiberias – Tiberius Caesar Augustus
- Zikhron Ya'akov - James Mayer de Rothschild

==== Southern District ====
- Ein HaShlosha - Deborah Epstein, Yaakov Baruch and Avraham Geller, three founding members who died during Arab-Israeli War in 1948
- Even Shmuel – Samuel Bronfman
- Kfar HaRif – Isaac Alfasi
- Kfar Maimon – Yehuda Leib Maimon
- Kfar Menahem – Menachem Ussishkin
- Kfar Ruppin – Arthur Ruppin
- Kfar Silver – Abba Hillel Silver
- Kokhav Michael – Michael Sobell
- Masu'ot Yitzhak - Yitzhak HaLevi Herzog
- Merhav Am - Rehavam Ze'evi
- Merkaz Shapira - Haim-Moshe Shapira
- Midreshet Ben-Gurion – David Ben-Gurion
- Misgav Dov - Dov Gruner
- Mitzpe Yehonatan (Southern) - Yonatan Steinberg, IDF officer
- Neve Harif - Moshe Harif
- Nir Akiva - Akiva Ettinger
- Nir Moshe - Moshe Smilansky
- Nir Yisrael - Yisrael Tiber (1894-1950), prominent industrialist
- Sde David – Zalman David Levontin (1856–1940)
- Sde Uziyahu - Uzziah
- Sdei Avraham – Avraham Herzfeld
- Sde Moshe - Maurice de Hirsch
- Talmei Yosef - Yosef Weitz
- Talmei Eliyahu – Eliyahu Krauze (1878–1962)
- Talmei Yaffe – Leib Yaffe
- Yad Mordechai - Mordechai Anielewicz
- Yad Natan - Ottó Komoly (Nathan Zeev Kohn)

==== Tel-Aviv District ====
- Herzliya – Theodor Herzl, a leader of Zionist movement
- Or Yehuda - Judah Alkalai
- Ramat Aharon – Rabbi Aharon Kotler

Former:

- Wilhelma (colloquially; formally: Hamîdije Wilhelma) was the name of Bnei Atarot – Sultan Abdul Hamid II, King William II of Württemberg and William II, German Emperor

=== Italy ===
- Alessandria – Pope Alexander III
- Andorno Micca – Pietro Micca
- Aosta – Augustus
- Arquà Petrarca – Petrarch
- Augusta – "Augusto" di Federico II di Svevia
- Bosisio Parini – Giuseppe Parini, Italian poet
- Caprese Michelangelo – Michelangelo, painter, sculptor, architect, poet and engineer
- Carloforte - Charles Emmanuel III
- Castagneto Carducci – Giosuè Carducci, poet
- Castelnuovo Don Bosco – John Bosco
- Castel Vittorio – Victor Emmanuel II of Italy, Father of the Italian fatherland
- Castellania Coppi - Fausto Coppi and Serse Coppi, racing cyclists
- Castiglione del Genovesi - Antonio Genovesi, philosopher and economist
- Cava Manara – Luciano Manara, patriot
- Colle Umberto - Umberto I of Italy
- Colleretto Giacosa - Giuseppe Giacosa, poet
- Corridonia – Filippo Corridoni, Italian socialist, IWW hero
- Corteno Golgi – Camillo Golgi, pathologist
- Ercolano – Heracles
- Grazzano Badoglio – Marshall Pietro Badoglio, soldier, politician, Prime Minister of Italy
- Grinzane Cavour - Camillo Benso, Count of Cavour
- Grizzana Morandi – Giorgio Morandi
- Gropello Cairoli – Benedetto Cairoli, politician, Prime Minister of Italy
- Guidonia Montecelio – Alessandro Guidoni, air force general
- Incisa Scapaccino – Giovanni Battista Scapaccino (1802–1834), soldier
- Jolanda di Savoia – Yolanda of Savoy
- Ladispoli – Prince Ladislao Odescalchi (1846–1920)
- Licciana Nardi - Anacarsi Nardi (1800–1844), local patriot
- Livorno Ferraris – Galileo Ferraris
- Mafalda – Mafalda of Savoy
- Maiolati Spontini - Gaspare Spontini, musician
- Manfredonia – Manfred of Sicily
- Marconia – Guglielmo Marconi
- Margherita di Savoia – Queen Margherita of Savoy
- Milena – Queen Milena of Montenegro
- Monte Porzio Catone - Cato the Elder, Roman writer and politician
- Morra De Sanctis – Francesco de Sanctis
- Paderno Ponchielli – Amilcare Ponchielli
- Pienza – Pope Pius II
- Porto Empedocle - Empedocles
- Porto Garibaldi - Giuseppe Garibaldi
- Porto Rafael - Count Rafael Neville (1926-1996)
- Premosello-Chiovenda - Giuseppe Chiovenda (1872-1937), jurist
- Riese Pio X – Pope Pius X
- Roggiano Gravina - Giovanni Vincenzo Gravina, jurist
- Rome – Romulus (disputed; see also: Rome#Etymology)
- Sagliano Micca – Pietro Micca, Piedmontese hero
- San Ferdinando di Puglia - Ferdinand II of the Two Sicilies
- San Gimignano – Saint Geminianus
- San Mauro Pascoli – Giovanni Pascoli, poet
- Sanremo – Saint Romulus of Genoa
- Santa Domenica Vittoria - Princess Vittoria Alliata of Villafranca
- Sasso Marconi – Guglielmo Marconi, Italian radio pioneer
- Serra San Bruno – Saint Bruno of Cologne
- Sotto il Monte Giovanni XXIII – Pope John XXIII
- Umbertide – Umberto I of Italy
- Terranuova Bracciolini – Poggio Bracciolini, Renaissance humanist
- Virgilio – Publius Vergilius Maro, classical Roman poet
- Vittorio Veneto – Victor Emmanuel II of Italy

=== Ivory Coast ===
- Bingerville – Louis-Gustave Binger, former French colonial governor
- Jean-Baptiste Mockey (Abidjan) – Jean-Baptiste Mockey
- Marie Koré (Abidjan) – Marie Koré (1912–1953), Ivorian independence activist
- Port-Bouët – Édouard Bouët-Willaumez, French admiral
- San-Pédro, Ivory Coast – Saint Peter
- Treichville – Marcel Treich-Laplène, French resident in Ivory Coast
- Yamoussoukro – Queen Yamoussou (died in 1909)

=== Jamaica ===
- Aberdeen, Jamaica – George Hamilton-Gordon, 4th Earl of Aberdeen
- Albert Town, Jamaica – Albert, Prince Consort
- Alexandria, Jamaica – Alexander Bustamante, First Prime Minister of Jamaica
- Berry Hill (Manchester) – Curtis Philip Berry
- Brown's Town – Hamilton Brown, Scots-Irish planter
- Darlingford, Jamaica – Charles Henry Darling, Governor of Jamaica
- Denham Town – Edward Brandis Denham, Governor of Jamaica
- Gordon Town, Jamaica – George William Gordon
- Granville, Jamaica – Granville Sharp
- Kingston, Jamaica – King William III of England
- Lionel Town, Jamaica - Sir Lionel Smith, 1st Baronet
- Mandeville, Jamaica – George Montagu, 6th Duke of Manchester, viscount Mandeville
- Moore Town, Jamaica – Sir Henry Moore, 1st Baronet
- Nanny Town – Nanny of the Maroons
- Norman Gardens (Kingston) – Norman Manley
- Petersfield, Jamaica – Peter Beckford, Governor of Jamaica
- Port Esquivel, Jamaica - Juan de Esquivel
- Queensborough, Kingston – Queen Victoria
- Saint Ann's Bay, Jamaica – Lady Anne Hyde
- Trenchtown – Daniel Power Trench (1813–1884)

=== Japan ===
- Asaka, Saitama – Prince Asaka Yasuhiko, a founder of a collateral branch of the Japanese imperial family
- Asano (Kitakyushu) – Asano Sōichirō
- Aoyama, Tokyo – Aoyama Tadanari, a Tokugawa general and chief retainer
- Date, Hokkaidō – Date Kunishige, a Japanese samurai
- Dōtonbori – Nariyasu Dōton
- Hayakawa (Yaita) – Tokuji Hayakawa
- Hiroshima – Ōe no Hiromoto + Fukushima Motonaga (disputed)
- Iidabashi – Iida Kihee, an Edo-period farmer
- Ikeda, Hokkaido – Nakahiro Ikeda (1877–1948)
- Imakane, Hokkaidō – Imamori Tōjirō (1870–1952) + Kanamori Tōjirō (1865–1909)
- Ina, Saitama – Ina Tadatsugu, a civil officer
- Isezakichō – Isaburō Aihara (1827–1901) and Akira Sasaki (1806–1876)
- Kamashi (Kanto) – Fujiwara no Kamatari
- Kano (Kobe) – Soshichi Kano (1827–1887)
- Karashima (Kumamoto) – Karashima Itaru (1854–1913), former mayor of Kumamoto
- Kita, Hokkaido – Yuji Kitamura (1871–1903)
- Kikusui (Sapporo) – Shuki Kikutei (1857–1905)
- Kogane Kiyoshigaoka (Chiba) – Kiyoshi Matsumoto (1909–1973), former mayor of Matsudo
- Kyōgoku, Hokkaidō – Kyōgoku Takanori (1858–1928), a former noble of the Kyōgoku clan
- Meiji (Nagoya) – Emperor Meiji
- Moriya (Yokohama) – Kosuke Moriya (1861–1931), Japanese lawyer
- Narashino, Chiba – Shinohara Kunimoto (1837–1877), a prominent military commander
- Niki, Hokkaidō – Niki Takeyoshi (1834–1915), a Japanese pioneer
- Noda, Chiba – Noda Umanosuke, Japanese military commander during the Muromachi period
- Nogimura (Shimane) - Nogi Maresuke
- Nogizaka, Tokyo – Nogi Maresuke
- Numata, Hokkaido – Kisaburo Numata (1834–1923)
- Ojin (Tokushima) – Emperor Ōjin
- Okawa (Kawasaki) – Heizaburō Ōkawa (1860–1936), Japanese businessman
- Ono, Fukushima – Ono no Takamura, Japanese poet
- Sakuragaoka (Nagoya) – Sakura Okamoto (1878–1935), Japanese businessman and president of Toho Gas
- Sanjō, Niigata – Sanjo Saemon, a legendary hero during the Edo period
- Senda (Hiroshima) – Sadaaki Senda
- Shimizu, Hokkaido - Shibusawa Eiichi
- Shiroishi (Kawasaki) – Motojiro Shiraishi (1867–1945), Japanese businessman
- Shōwa, Fukushima – Hirohito (Emperor Shōwa)
- Susukino – Tatsuyuki Usui (1829–1916)
- Suzuki (Kawasaki) – Saburosuke Suzuki (1858–1931), Ajinomoto Company´s founder
- Tadaoka, Osaka – Taira no Tadayuki, son of a Japanese warrior
- Takashimadaira – Takashima Shūhan
- Tendō, Yamagata – Kitabatake Tendōmaru, owner of Tendō castle during the Muromachi period
- Tōgō-mura - Tōgō Heihachirō
- Torahime, Shiga – Tora Gozen, a late Heian period prostitute
- Toyota, Aichi – Sakichi Toyoda and Kiichiro Toyoda
- Tsukigata, Hokkaidō – Tsukigata Kiyoshi (1847–1885), Japanese Samurai
- Tsuruga, Fukui – Tsunuga Arashito, Japanese Samurai
- Wake, Okayama – Wake no Kiyomaro, a high-ranking Japanese official during the Nara period

=== Jordan ===
- Abila, formerly named Seleucia – a Seleucus among the Seleucid dynasty
- Abu Nseir area - Musa ibn Nusayr
- Al-Abdali – King Abdullah I of Jordan
- Al Hashimiyya - Hussein, King of Hejaz
- Amman – Ammon
- Husseiniya, Jordan - Hussein of Jordan
- Tariq area - Tariq ibn Ziyad
- Umm Qais:
  - formerly named Antiochia – Antiochus III the Great
  - formerly named Seleucia – Seleucus II Callinicus

=== Kazakhstan ===
- Abay (town). Abay, Aktobe, Abay, Almaty and Abay District, East Kazakhstan – Abai Qunanbaiuly, Kazakh poet, composer and philosopher
- Altynsarin District – Ybyrai Altynsarin, a Kazakh educator
- Amangeldi – Amankeldı İmanov (1873–1919), Kazakh national leader
- Auezov district (Almaty) – Mukhtar Auezov, a Kazakh writer
- Ayteke Bi District – Aiteke Biy (1644–1700), Kazakh biy and tribesman
- Ayteke Bi – Ayteke Biy
- Balpyk Bi – Kazakh military hero Balpyk Derbisaliuly
- Bauyrjan Momyshuly – Kazakh military officer Bauyrzhan Momyshuly
- Baydibek District – Baidibek Karashauly (1356–1419), legendary hero
- Bayganin District – Nurpeis Baiganin (1860–1945), Kazakh folk singer
- Bayzak District – Bayzak Mambetuly (1789–1864), Kazakh military leader and politician
- Beimbet Mailin District – Beimbet Mailin (1894–1938), Kazakh writer
- Bokey Orda District – Bokei Khan, chairman of the Khan's Council during the Aishuak Khan
- Budennovka (Akmola) – Semyon Budyonny
- Bukhar-Zhyrau District – Bukhar-zhirau Kalmakanov, a Kazakh poet
- Chapaev, Kazakhstan – Red Army hero of the Russian Civil War Vasily Chapayev
- Fort-Shevchenko – Ukrainian poet Taras Shevchenko
- Gabit Musirepov District – Gabit Musirepov, Kazakh writer
- Hamit Ergaliev (Atyrau) – Hamit Ergaliev (1916–1997), writer
- Imeni Baymaganbeta Iztolin (North Kazakhstan) – Baymaganbet Iztolin (1899–1921), poet
- Imeni Dinmukhamed Kunaev (Zhambyl) and Qonaev – Dinmukhamed Kunaev
- Imeni Diny Nurpeisovoy – Kazakh composer and dombura player Dina Nurpeisova
- Imeni Imangali Biltabanov (Aktobe) – Imangali Biltabanov (1925–1945), Kazakh hero
- Imeni Kudaibergen Zhubanov (Aktobe) – Kudaibergen Zhubanov (1899–1938), philologist
- Imeni Rakhim Sabdenov (Zhambyl) – Rakhim Sabdenov (1929–2000), Socialist workers' hero
- Imeni Kasim Kaysenova (East Kazakhstan) – Qasim Qaysenov, Kazakh writer and military officer
- Imeni Shamshi Kaldayakov (Aktobe) and Imeni Shamshi Kaldayakov (Turkistan) – Shamshi Kaldayakov, a Kazakhstani composer
- Imeni Tattibay Duisebayev (Zhambyl) – Tattibay Duisebayev (1923–1996), Kazakh police general
- Imeni Temirbek Zhurgenov (Aktobe) – Temirbek Zhurgenov (1898–1938), writer
- Jambyl District, Jambyl – Kazakh akyn (folk singer) Jambyl Jabayev
- Karim Mynbayev (Karaganda) – Karim Mynbayev (1906–1948), Kazakh scientist and teacher
- Kurchatov – Soviet nuclear physicist Igor Kurchatov
- Kurmangazy District – Kazakh composer Qurmangazy Sagyrbaiuly
- Magzhan Zhumabayev District – Kazakh writer Magzhan Zhumabayev
- Makhambet – Makhambet Otemisuly, Kazakh Poet
- Mamlyut – Mavlyut Valguzin, a Tatar peasant
- Mantai Zharymbetov (Turkistan) – Mantai Zharymbetov (1912–1967), Socialist worker's hero
- Nurmukhamed Esentaev (Turkistan) – Nurmukhamed Esentaev (1909–1975), Socialist worker's hero
- Panfilov District, Kazakhstan – Ivan Panfilov
- Pavlodar – Grand Duke Paul Alexandrovich of Russia
- Petropavl – Saint Peter and Saint Paul
- Raiymbek District – Raiymbek Batyr
- Ridder – Philip Ridder; between 1941 and 2002 the city was called Leninogorsk after Lenin
- Satpayev – Kazakh geologist and first president of Kazakhstan Academy of Sciences Kanysh Satpayev
- Shal akyn District – Tileuke Kulekeuly (Shal Akyn), a Kazakh poet
- Tole Bi District – Töle Biy
- Turar Ryskulov, Turkistan – Kazakh politician Turar Ryskulov
- Turar Ryskulov District – Turar Ryskulov, President of the Turkestan Autonomous Soviet Socialist Republic
- Ualikhanov District – Shoqan Walikhanov, ethnographer
- Zhambyl District, Almaty Region – Jambyl Jabayev. Kazakh traditional folk singer
- Zhambyl District, North Kazakhstan Region – Jambyl Jabayev
- Zhangeldi District – Alibi Zhangeldi (1884-1953), Kazakh revolutionary
- Zhansugirov – Ilyas Zhansugurov, Kazakh writer
- Zhanybek District – Janibek Khan, a co-founder and the second Khan of the Kazakh Khanate from 1473–1480

Former:

- Dzhambul was the name of Taraz – Kazakh poet Zhambyl Zhabayev
- Guryev was the name of Atyrau – Russian merchant Dmitry Guryev
- Leninsk was the name of Baikonur – Vladimir Lenin
- Nur-Sultan was the name of Astana – Nursultan Nazarbayev, 1st President of Kazakhstan
- Panfilov was the name of Zharkent – Ivan Panfilov
- Shevchenko was the name of Aqtau – Taras Shevchenko
- Yermak was the name of Aksu – Russian national hero and explorer of Siberia Yermak Timofeyevich

=== Kenya ===
- Isiolo - Issa Olo, local village headman
- Kabarnet - Albert Edmund Barnett (1876-1971), Australian missionary from the Africa Inland Mission
- Karen, Kenya – Karen Blixen, a Danish author of the colonial memoir Out of Africa
- Kenyatta, Nairobi – Jomo Kenyatta
- Kericho - Ole Kericho, 18th-century Maasai chief
- Machakos – Masaku wa Munyati, Akamba chief
- Mackinnon Road - Sir William Mackinnon, 1st Baronet
- Mazeras - Chief Mazera
- Moi's Bridge - Daniel arap Moi, second President of Kenya
- Mumias - Nabongo Mumia
- Port Victoria (Kenya) – Queen Victoria
- Sultan Hamud - Sultan of Zanzibar, Sultan Ali bin Hamud (1884-1918)
- Thomson's Falls – Joseph Thomson (explorer)

=== Kosovo ===
- Ferizaj – Feriz Shasivari
- Obilić – Miloš Obilić
- Skenderaj – George Kastrioti Skanderbeg

Former:

- Đeneral Janković was the name of Elez Han – Božidar Janković

=== Kuwait ===
- Abdullah as-Salim suburb – Abdullah Al-Salim Al-Sabah
- Al Ahmadi, Kuwait – Ahmad Al-Jaber Al-Sabah
- Fahd al-Ahmad Suburb – Fahad Al-Ahmed Al-Jaber Al-Sabah
- Jabir al-Ahmad City – Jaber Al-Ahmad Al-Sabah
- Sabah al-Ahmad City – Sabah Al-Ahmad Al-Jaber Al-Sabah
- Sabah as-Salim suburb – Sabah Al-Salim Al-Sabah

=== Kyrgyzstan ===
- Аbdrakhmanov (Issyk-Kul) – Yusup Abdrakhmanov (1901–1938), Kyrgyz politician
- Abdy-Suerkulov (Toktogul) – Abdy Suerkulov (1912–1992), Kyrgyz Prime Minister
- Absamat Masaliev (Kadamjay) – Absamat Masaliyev
- Aitmatov District – Chinghiz Aitmatov, author
- Aldashev (Jeti-Ögüz) – Abdulkhai Aldashev (1918–2003), Kyrgyz pharmacologist, toxicologist and translator
- Alla-Anarov (Aravan) – Alla Anarov (1907–1979), cotton producer
- Aydaraliev (Talas) – Rysbek Aidaraliev (1922–1998), Kyrgyz public figure
- Amanbayevo – Aldabergen Amanbaev (1927–1975), Kyrgyz Socialist workers' hero
- Anan'yevo – one of the Panfilov's Twenty-Eight Guardsmen, Nikolay Yakovlevich Anan'yev (1912–1941)
- Atai Ogonbaev (Talas) – Atai Ogonbaev (1900–1949), Kyrgyz musician and compositor
- Baetov – Kyrgyz singer and composer Musa Baetov (1902–1949)
- Baytik – Baytik Batyr (1823–1886), one of the leaders of the Solto tribe who fought the Kokand Khanate
- Berdike Baatyr (Talas) – Berdike Baatyr (1740–1790)
- Bishkek – Bishkek Batyr (1700–1757), Commander of the Kyrgyz army in the war against the invaders of Dzungar in the 18th century.
- Bokonbayevo – Kyrgyz poet and dramatist, Dzhoomart Bokonbaev (1910–1944)
- Cholponbay – Cholponbai Tuleberdiyev (1922–1944), World War II hero
- Dokturbek Kurmanaliev (Ysyk-Ata) – Dokturbek Kurmanaliev (1948–2004)
- Ibraimov – Kyrgyz Prime Minister Sultan Ibraimov
- Imeni Aliaskara Toktonalieva (Ysyk-Ata) – Aliaskar Toktonaliev (1929–1990), Finance Minister
- Isanov (Osh) – Nasirdin Isanov, Kyrgyz Prime Minister
- Jalal-Abad – Jalal-ud-Din Muhammad Akbar
- Jayyl District – Jayyl Batyr (1692–1780), one of the heroes of the Solto tribe
- Karasaev (Tüp) – Kusein Karasaev (1901–1998), Kyrgyz linguist
- Kaynazarova (Chuy) – Zuurakan Kaynazarova
- Kazybek (Naryn) – Kazybek Mambetimin uulu (1901–1936), poet
- Kochubaev (Osh) – Toi'chu Tagaevich Kochubaev (1922–1981), Kyrgyz Socialist workers' hero
- Kochkorbaev (Chuy) – Isak Kochkorbaev (1890–1965), Kyrgyz Socialist workers' hero
- Kulatov (Nookat) – Turabay Kulatov (1908–1984), Kyrgyz Prime Minister
- Kurmanbek (Suzak) – Kurmanbek Batyr, mythical hero
- Kurmanjan Datka (Batken) and Kurmanjan Datka (Osh) – Kurmanjan Datka
- Lenin District, Bishkek – Vladimir Lenin
- Manas District – Manas, mythical Kyrgyz national hero
- Mavlyanov (Aksy) – Junai Mavlyanov (1923–2003), writer and poet
- Mombekovo (Nooken) – Yusup Mombekov (1926–1983), Kyrgyz socialist workers' hero
- Nurzhanov (Talas) – Akmatbek Nurzhanov (1922–1987), Kyrgyz socialist workers' hero
- Ormon-Khan aliyl (Naryn) – Ormon Khan
- Ömüraliev (Talas) – Baky Ömüraliev (1932–2003), Kyrgyz actor and film director
- Osmonkulov (Talas) – Iskender Osmonkulov (1907–1992), Kyrgyz socialist workers' hero
- Panfilov District, Kyrgyzstan – Ivan Panfilov
- Pristan'-Przheval'sk – Nikolay Przhevalsky
- Shabdan – Shabdan Baatyr (1839–1912)
- Shopokov – Kyrgyz World War II hero Duyshenkul Shopokov (1915–1941)
- Süymönkul Chokmorov – Kyrgyz film actor Suimenkul Chokmorov
- Sverdlov District, Bishkek – Yakov Sverdlov
- Razzakov – Iskhak Razzakov
- Toktogul – Kyrgyz Musician Toktogul Satilganov
- Togolok-Moldo Rural District (Naryn) – Togolok Moldo, Kyrgyz poet
- Toktomat Zulpuev (Nookat) – Toktomat Zulpuev (1925–1995)
- Urazbekov (Batken) – Abdukadyr Urazbekov (1889–1938), Kyrgyz statesman
- Yusupov aliyl (Osh) – Sultan Yusupov (1918–2004), Kyrgyz music teacher
- Zharkynbayevo – Kazak Zharkynbaev (1911–1969), Kyrgyz hero

Former:

- Frunze was the name of Bishkek from 1926 through 1991 – Mikhail Frunze
- Przhevalsk was the name of Karakol from 1888 through 1921 and 1939 through 1991 – Nikolai Przhevalsky

=== Laos ===
- Anouvong district - Anouvong, King of Vientiane
- Kaysone Phomvihane District, Savannakhet province – Kaysone Phomvihane, President of Laos

=== Latvia ===
- Jēkabpils – Jacob Kettler, Duke of the Duchy of Courland and Semigallia
- Kalpaks (Saldus) - Colonel Oskars Kalpaks
- Lucavsala – Klauss Lucavs
- Pāvilosta – after Paul von Lilienfeld, governor of Kurzeme
- Pētersala-Andrejsala – Peter the Great
- Valdemārpils – Krišjānis Valdemārs, writer and politician
- Valka (Estonian: Valga) – possibly after the de Walko (de Walco) family

Former:

- Stučka was the name of Aizkraukle – Pēteris Stučka, Latvian revolutionary and communist

=== Lebanon ===
- Al-Ghandouriyah - Hajj Ali Ghandour, founder
- Al-Majidiyah (Nabatieh) - Majid Arslan
- Foch-Allenby district (Beirut) – Ferdinand Foch and Edmund Allenby, 1st Viscount Allenby

Former:

- Laodicea in Phoenicia was an ancient name of Beirut – royal woman named Laodice among the Seleucid dynasty

=== Lesotho ===
- Mohale's Hoek – Mohale, a King Moshoeshoe I's brother

=== Liberia ===
- A.B. Tolbert Community – Adolphus Benedict Tolbert (died in 1980), a former President's son
- Arthington, Liberia – Robert Arthington, an attorney and philanthropist from Leeds, England
- Barclayville – Edwin Barclay, President of Liberia
- Buchanan – Thomas Buchanan, American diplomat
- Careysburg – Lott Carey, a Baptist minister
- Clay-Ashland – Henry Clay, an American lawyer, planter, and statesman
- Greenville, Liberia – Judge James Green
- Harbel – Harvey S. Firestone and his wife Idabelle
- Harper, Liberia – Robert Goodloe Harper, American politician
- Monrovia – James Monroe, President of the United States
- Robertsport – Joseph Jenkins Roberts, First President of Liberia
- Samuel K. Doe Community (Monrovia) – Samuel Doe
- Schieffelin, Margibi County – Henry M. Schieffelin, American philanthropist and Consul-General in Liberia
- Tubmanburg – William Tubman, President of Liberia

=== Libya ===
- ʽAziziya – Abdulaziz, Sultan of the Ottoman Empire
- Benghazi – Sidi Ghazi, Benefactor of the city
- Ptolemais – a king of the Ptolemies, probably Ptolemy III Euergetes
- Qaryat ʽUmar al Mukhtar – Omar Mukhtar, Libyan resistance leader

Former:

- Villaggio Giovanni Berta was the name of Al Qubbah - Giovanni Berta, Italian fascist militant killed in Florence and designated a "Martyr of the Fascist Revolution"
- Villaggio D'Annunzio was the name of El Bayyada - Gabriele D'Annunzio, Italian poet, WWI aviator, and nationalist figure who popularized the concept of Libya as Italy's "Fourth Shore"
- Villaggio Baracca was the name of Farzoughah - Francesco Baracca, Italy's top fighter ace of World War I
- Villaggio Razza was the name of Massah, Libya - Luigi Razza, an Italian fascist syndicalist and Minister of Public Works who died in a plane crash in Egypt.
- Villaggio Bianchi was the name of Zahra, Libya - Michele Bianchi, an Italian syndicalist, fascist leader, and one of the Quadrumvirs of the March on Rome
- Villaggio Giordani was the name of al-Nasiriyya - Giulio Giordani (1883–1920), an Italian lawyer and WWI veteran killed in Bologna who became a fascist martyr
- Villaggio Gioda was the name of Al Karamah] - Mario Gioda (1883–1924), an early Italian fascist leader and journalist from Turin
- Villaggio Battisti was the name of Al Marj area - Cesare Battisti (1875–1916), Italian irredentist politician and WWI soldier executed by Austria-Hungary
- Villaggio Filzi was the name of Marj area - Fabio Filzi (1884–1916), Italian irredentist and WWI volunteer executed alongside Cesare Battisti
- Villaggio Luigi di Savoia was the name of Al Abraq, Libya - Prince Luigi Amedeo, Duke of the Abruzzi (1873–1933), an Italian mountaineer, explorer, and WWI admiral
- Villaggio Maddalena was the name of Al Awiliya - Umberto Maddalena (1894–1931), a celebrated Italian WWI pilot and long-distance aviator
- Villaggio Olivetti was the name of Joudaim - Ivo Oliveti (1895-1936), aviator and military officer

=== Lithuania ===
- Basanavičiai (Kėdainiai) - Jonas Basanavičius
- Biliūnai (Panevėžys) - Jonas Biliūnas
- Darius (Klaipėda) - Steponas Darius
- Garliava – Józef Godlewski, founder
- Girėnai (Marijampolé) - Stasys Girėnas
- Grigiškės – Grzegorz Kurec, Polish architect
- Janapolė – Jan Dominik Łopaciński, benefactor
- Jonava – Jan Mikołaj Kossowski
- Kaišiadorys – a Tatar noble, Khaishadar
- Kudirkos Naumiestis – Vincas Kudirka, Lithuanian poet
- Marijampolė – Blessed Virgin Mary
- Maironiai (Kelmes) - Maironis
- Smetoniškės (Trakų) - Antanas Smetona
- Vydūnai (Šilutės) - Vydūnas

Former:

- Kapsukas was the name of Marijampolė – Vincas Mickevičius-Kapsukas, Lithuanian communist politician
- Sniečkus was the name of Visaginas – Antanas Sniečkus, Lithuanian communist politician

=== Luxembourg ===
- Ettelbruck – Etzel (Attila the Hun)

=== Malawi ===
- Aaron, Malawi – biblical prophet Aaron
- Banda (Central) – Hastings Banda
- Cape Maclear – Thomas Maclear
- Fort Maguire (Southern) – Captain Cecil Montgomery Maguire (died in 1891)
- Livingstonia, Malawi – David Livingstone
- Liwonde – Chief Liwonde

Former:

- Fort Anderson was the name of Mulanje – Sir Henry Percy Anderson (1831–1896), Harry Johnston's father-in-law
- Fort Hill was the name of Chitipa – Clement Lloyd Hill, British diplomat
- Fort Johnston was the name of Mangochi – Harry Johnston, British botanist and colonial administrator
- Fort Lister was the name of Phalombe – Thomas Villiers Lister, British diplomat
- Fort Manning was the name of Mchinji – William Manning (colonial administrator), Governor of Nyasaland

=== Malaysia ===
- Beaufort, Malaysia – Leicester Paul Beaufort, colonial governor of North Borneo
- Bandar Dato' Onn – Onn Jaafar, Malayan politician
- Bandar Menjalara – Paduka Seri Cik Menjalara (1853-1941)
- Bandar Muadzam Shah – Abu Bakar of Pahang, fourth Sultan of Pahang
- Bandar Seri Putra – Tunku Abdul Rahman
- Bandar Tun Abdul Razak – Abdul Razak Hussein, 2nd Prime Minister of Malaysia
- Bandar Tun Razak – Abdul Razak Hussein
- Bandar Tun Razak, Jengka – Abdul Razak Hussein
- Butterworth, Penang – William John Butterworth, governor of the Straits Settlements
- Cameron Highlands – William Cameron, British geologist
- Carey Island – Edward Valentine John Carey (1865–1914), English planter in Malaya
- FELDA L.B. Johnson – Lyndon B. Johnson, American president
- FELDA Soeharto – Suharto, Indonesian president
- Fraser's Hill – Louis James Fraser, Scottish pioneer
- George Town, Penang – George III the United Kingdom
- Gohtong Jaya – Lim Goh Tong, Malaysian Chinese businessman & entrepreneur
- Hang Tuah Jaya – Hang Tuah, legendary hero
- Kampung Gandhi – Mahatma Gandhi
- Pekan Gurney – Henry Gurney, British colonial administrator
- Port Dickson – John Frederick Dickson, British colonial administrator
- Putrajaya – Tunku Abdul Rahman, father of Malayan independence
- Seri Iskandar – Iskandar of Perak, 30th Sultan of Perak
- Shah Alam – Hisamuddin of Selangor, King of Malaysia
- Taman Tun Dr Ismail – Ismail Abdul Rahman, Deputy Prime Minister of Malaysia
- Taman Tun Sardon – Sardon Jubir, governor of Penang
- Taman Tun Teja – Princess Tun Teja
- Taman U-Thant – U Thant, UN Secretary-General from 1961 until 1971
- Templer's Park – Gerald Templer, senior British Army officer
- Victoria, Labuan – Queen Victoria
- Weston – Arthur Joseph West, British North Borneo railway engineer

Former:

- Jesselton was the name of Kota Kinabalu – Sir Charles Jessel, British colonial administrator

=== Mali ===
- N'Golobougou - N'Golo Diarra, 18th-century King of the Segou Empire
- Ouezzindougou – Daniel Ouezzin Coulibaly, Burkinabé politician
- Sony Aliber - Sunni Ali Ber, 15th ruler of the Sunni dynasty
- Timbuktu – Buktu, a malian old woman who lived in that region

=== Malta ===
- Cottonera – Grandmaster Nicolas Cotoner
- Floriana – architect Pietro Paolo Floriani
- Manoel Island – Grandmaster António Manoel de Vilhena
- Paola – Grandmaster Antoine de Paule
- Paceville – Dr. Giuseppe Pace (1890–1971), Maltese lawyer and developer
- Pembroke, Malta - Robert Herbert, 12th Earl of Pembroke
- Qormi (Città Pinto) – Grandmaster Manuel Pinto da Fonseca
- San Ġiljan – St. Julian
- San Ġwann – St. John
- San Lawrenz – St. Lawrence
- San Pawl il-Baħar – Paul the Apostle
- Santa Luċija – St. Lucy
- Santa Venera – St. Venera
- Senglea – Grandmaster Claude de la Sengle
- Siġġiewi (Città Ferdinand) – Grandmaster Ferdinand von Hompesch
- Valletta – Grandmaster Jean Parisot de Valette
- Victoria – Queen Victoria
- Żabbar (Città Hompesch) – Grandmaster Ferdinand von Hompesch
- Żebbuġ (Città Rohan) – Grandmaster Emmanuel de Rohan-Polduc
- Żejtun (Città Beland) – Ferdinand von Hompesch's mother

=== Mauritania ===
- Arafat, Mauritania – Yasser Arafat
- Boubacar Ben Amer – Abu Bakr Ibn Omar (d.1087)

Former:

- "Fort Gouraud" was the name of Fderîck – Henri Gouraud
- "Fort-Trinquet" was the name of Bir Moghrein – Maurice-Numa-Émile Trinquet (1879–1941)
- "Port-Étienne" was the name of Nouadhibou – Eugène Étienne

=== Mauritius ===
- Mahébourg – Bertrand-François Mahé de La Bourdonnais
- Port Louis – Louis XV of France
- Souillac – François de Souillac

=== Mexico ===
- Apodaca, Nuevo León – Salvador de Apodaca y Loreto, bishop
- Ciudad Juárez – Benito Juárez, president
- Ciudad López Mateos – Adolfo López Mateos, president
- Ciudad Nezahualcóyotl – Nezahualcoyotl, poet
- Ciudad Obregón – Álvaro Obregón, president
- Ciudad Victoria – Guadalupe Victoria, first president
- General Escobedo – Mariano Escobedo
- Hermosillo – José María González Hermosillo
- Guadalupe, Zacatecas and other communities named Guadalupe – Our Lady of Guadalupe (Mary)
- Guerrero state and several other localities – Vicente Guerrero, independence leader and president
- Hidalgo, state and several other localities – Miguel Hidalgo y Costilla, independence leader and Father of the Nation
- Lázaro Cárdenas, Michoacán – Lázaro Cárdenas del Río, president
- Morelia – José María Morelos, independence leader
- Morelos state and several other localities – José María Morelos, independence leader
- San Luis Potosí City and state – King Louis IX of France
- San Nicolás de los Garza – Pedro de la Garza, benefactor of the town
- Tuxtla Gutiérrez – Joaquín Miguel Gutiérrez, independence leader
- Quintana Roo – Andrés Quintana Roo, politician

=== Moldova ===
- Alexanderfeld, Cahul and Alexandrovca, Floresti - Alexander III of Russia
- Alexandru cel Bun, Soroca - Alexander the Good
- Alexandru Ioan Cuza, Cahul – Alexandru Ioan Cuza, Prince of Moldavia
- Cantemir, Moldova – Dimitrie Cantemir
- Ciorescu, Chişinău – Ion Gheorghe Ciorescu (founder)
- Constantinovca, Edinet - Constantin Stamati-Ciurea
- Frunză, Ocnița – Mikhail Frunze
- Grigoriopol - Gregory the Illuminator
- Ion Vodă, Florești – John III the Terrible
- Lazo, Ștefan Vodă – Sergey Lazo, Moldavian revolutionary
- Lebedenco, Cahul – Nikita Lebedenko, Soviet military leader
- Malinovscoe, Riscani - Rodion Malinovsky
- Miciurin – Ivan Vladimirovich Michurin
- Mihailovca, Floresti - Michael the Brave
- Nicolaevca - Nicholas II
- Regina Maria, Soroca – Marie of Romania
- Rumeantsev, Cahul - Pyotr Rumyantsev
- Ștefan Vodă – Stephen III of Moldavia
- Stefanesti, Floresti - Ștefan Casso, landowner
- Vadul lui Vodă - Stephen III of Moldavia
- Vișniovca - Sevastian Wiśniowski (founder)

Former:

- "Kotovsk" was the name of Hîncești – Grigory Kotovsky
- "Kutuzov" was the name of Ialoveni – Mikhail Kutuzov
- "Lazovsk" was the name of Sîngerei – Sergey Lazo
- "Suvorovo" was the name of Ștefan Vodă – Alexander Suvorov

=== Mongolia ===
- Choibalsan city, Dornod – Khorloogiin Choibalsan, Mongolian revolutionary and politician
- Choibalsan sum, Dornod – Khorloogiin Choibalsan
- Khatanbulag – Börte, Great Khatun of the Mongol Empire
- Magsarjav (Khovd) – Khatanbaatar Magsarjav
- Öndörkhaan (now Chinggis Khot) – Genghis Khan
- Sükhbaatar city – Damdin Sükhbaatar, Mongolian independence hero
- Sükhbaatar district – Damdin Sükhbaatar
- Sükhbaatar Province – Damdin Sükhbaatar
- Ulaanbaatar – Damdin Sükhbaatar

=== Montenegro ===
- Danilovgrad – Danilo I, Prince of Montenegro
- Herceg Novi – Duke (Herceg) Stjepan Vukčić Kosača
- Petrovac – King Peter I of Serbia
- Tomaševo – Tomaš Žižić, Montenegrin national hero

Former:

- Titograd was the name of Podgorica from 1946 to 1992 – Josip Broz Tito
- Ivangrad was the name of Berane from 1946 to 1992 – Ivan Milutinović

=== Morocco ===
- El Mansouria, Morocco - Ahmad al-Mansur
- Errachidia - Al-Rashid of Morocco
- Hay Hassani - Hassan II of Morocco
- Hay Mohammadi - Mohammed V of Morocco
- Mohammedia – King Mohammed V of Morocco
- Moulay Rachid (district) – Prince Moulay Rachid of Morocco
- Moulay Yacoub - Yaqub al-Mansur
- Youssoufia, Morocco - Yusef of Morocco

Former:

- Camp Boucheron was the name of El Gara - Pierre Boucheron, a French soldier killed in 1908 during the Chaouïa campaign
- Camp Boulhaut was the name of Benslimane - Pol Boulhaut, a French soldier killed in 1908 during the Chaouïa campaign
- Petitjean was the name of Sidi Kacem - Captain Petitjean, a French army officer killed near Kénitra in May 1911 during the French campaign
- Louis-Gentil was the name of Youssoufia - Louis Gentil, a French geologist who mapped Morocco's phosphate deposits starting in 1902
- Port-Lyautey was the name of Kéntira - Hubert Lyautey, first French Resident-General in Morocco (1912–1925)
- Villa Sanjurjo was the name of Al Hoceima - José Sanjurjo, Spanish general who led the 1925 Rif War landing at Alhucemas Bay.

=== Mozambique ===
- Beira, Mozambique – Luís Filipe, Prince Royal of Portugal (titled Prince of Beira)
- Chissano (Gaza) – Alberto Chissano, Mozambican sculptor
- Maputo – Chief Maputsu I of the Tembe clan
- Mozambique Island – Mussa Bin Bique, an Arab Muslim chief of the early 16th century
- Ilha Josina Machel (Manhiça) – Josina Machel, a former President's wife
- Manhiça District – Manacusse, a Tchaka chief, who moved here after some conflict in his native area
- Ressano Garcia – Frederico Ressano Garcia (1847–1911), Portuguese politician and engineer
- Vila Eduardo Mondlane – Eduardo Mondlane, President of the Mozambican Liberation Front (FRELIMO)

Former:

- António Enes was the name of Angoche – António José Enes (1848–1901), Portuguese journalist and colonial administrator
- Augusto Cardoso was the name of Metangula – Augusto Cardoso (1859–1930), Portuguese explorer
- Caldas Xavier was the name of Cambulatsitse – Alfredo Augusto Caldas Xavier (1852–1896), Portuguese colonial administrator
- Cidade Salazar was the name of Matola – António de Oliveira Salazar
- João Belo was the name of Xai-Xai – João Belo (1878–1928), Portuguese military
- Lourenço Marques was the name of Maputo – Lourenço Marques (explorer)
- Malvernia was the name of Chicualacuala (Vila Eduardo Mondlane) – Godfrey Huggins, 1st Viscount Malvern
- Porto Amélia was the name of Pemba, Mozambique – Queen Amélie of Orléans
- Vila Coutinho was the name of Ulongué – João António de Azevedo Coutinho Fragoso de Sequeira (1865–1944)
- Vila Fontes was the name of Caia, Mozambique – Fontes Pereira de Melo
- Vila Gomes da Costa was the name of Alto Changane – Manuel Gomes da Costa, Portuguese president
- Vila Gouveia was the name of Catandica – Manuel António de Sousa, Portuguese military captain
- Vila Junqueiro was the name of Gurúè – Manuel Saraiva Junqueiro (d.1959)
- Vila Machado was the name of Nhamatanda – Joaquim José Machado
- Vila Paiva de Andrada was the name of Gorongosa – Joaquim Carlos Paiva de Andrada (1846–1928)
- Vila Pery was the name of Chimoio – João Pery de Lind (1861–1930), Governor of Mozambique Company Territories of Manica and Sofala
- Vila Pinto Teixeira was the name of Mabalane – Francisco dos Santos Pinto Teixeira (1887–1983), Portuguese military engineer
- Vila Trigo de Morais was the name of Chokwe, Mozambique – António Trigo de Morais (1895–1966), Portuguese engineer
- Vila Vasco da Gama was the name of Chiputo – Vasco da Gama

=== Myanmar ===
- Bogyoke Village (Yangon Region) - Bogyoke (General) Aung San
- Fort Hertz - William Axel Hertz (1859-1950)
- Fort White, Myanmar - George White (British Army officer)
- Maha Bandula Park – General Maha Bandula
- Mindon, Myanmar – Mindon Min, King of Burma
- Thibaw, Shan State – Thibaw Min, King of Burma

=== Namibia ===
- Caprivi Strip – Leo von Caprivi, German general and statesman
- Helao Nafidi - Nabot "Camilo" Helao Nafidi (d.1981), Chief Political Commissar of the People's Liberation Army of Namibia (PLAN) during the liberation struggle
- Henties Bay, Namibia – Major Hentie van der Merwe (1871–1954)
- John Pandeni Constituency – John Pandeni, a member of the South West Africa People's Organization (SWAPO)
- Judea Lyaboloma Constituency – Judea Lyaboloma (died in 1968), a former People's Liberation Army of Namibia (PLAN) guerrilla
- Keetmanshoop – Johann Keetman, German trader
- Lüderitz – Adolf Lüderitz
- Mariental, Namibia – Maria, the wife of the first colonial settler of the area, Hermann Brandt
- Moses ǁGaroëb Constituency – Moses ǁGaroëb, a Namibian Politician
- Nehale lyaMpingana Constituency – Nehale Mpingana, Namibian National hero
- Samora Machel Constituency – Samora Machel, President of Mozambique
- Tobias Hainyeko constituency – Tobias Hainyeko, a guerrilla war hero
- Wlotzkasbaken - Paul Hermann Wlotzka (1870–1942), a former Schutztruppe coachman and transport merchant

Former:

- Caprivi Region was the name of Zambezi Region, named after Leo von Caprivi
- Schuckmannsburg – Bruno von Schuckmann (since 2013 called Luhonono)

=== Nepal ===
- Amargadhi - Gorkha General Amar Singh Thapa
- Bhanu Municipality - Bhanubhakta Acharya
- Bhimdatta – Bhimdatta Panta, revolutionary farmer leader
- Birendranagar – King Birendra of Nepal
- Birendranagar, Chitwan – King Birendra of Nepal
- Birgunj – Bir Shumsher Jung Bahadur Rana, Nepali statesman
- Byans – Vyas, legendary author of Hinduism
- Chandrapur Municipality - Chandra Shumsher Jung Bahadur Rana
- Chhimkeshwari - Hindu goddess Chhimkeshwari Mai
- Dasharathchand – Dashrath Chand, a martyr of Nepalese Democratic Movement
- Ganeshman Charanath - Ganesh Man Singh
- Gaurishankar, Dolakha - Hindu deities Gauri (a manifestation of the goddess Parvati) and Shankar (a name for Lord Shiva)
- Gitanagar - Geeta Rani Rana, wife of Thakuri Prachanda Singh of Royal House of Tulsipur
- Indrasarowar Rural Municipality - Indra, Crown Princess of Nepal
- Janakpur – King Janak, an ancient Indian king of Videha,
- Jaya Prithvi – Jaya Prithvi Bahadur Singh, a humanist, peace advocate, writer and social activist
- K.I. Singh Rural Municipality – Kunwar Inderjit Singh, 20th Prime Minister of Nepal
- Krishnapur, Nepal – Krishna
- Khumbu Pasanglhamu Rural Municipality – Pasang Lhamu Sherpa
- Lakshminagar, Doti - Princess Lakshmi of Nepal
- Lekhnath - Lekhnath Paudyal
- Mahendrakot and Mahendranagar, Dhanusha – Mahendra of Nepal
- Phalgunanda Rural Municipality – Phalgunanda
- Pratappur Rural Municipality - Pratap Malla
- Prithivinagar – Prithvi Narayan Shah
- Ramprasad Rai – Ram Prasad Rai, a Nepali revolutionary who was disappeared and killed in 1951
- Ratnanagar - Queen Ratna of Nepal
- Saradanagar - Princess Sharada Shah of Nepal
- Shadanand Municipality - Bala Guru Shadananda
- Shivanagar - Mr. Shiv Prasad Rajouria, community worker, and philanthropist
- Shivanagar, Chitwan - Shiva
- Siddharthanagar – from Buddha's given name Siddhartha
- Siddhicharan Municipality – Siddhicharan Shrestha
- Tribhuwannagar – Tribhuvan of Nepal
- Tripurasundari Rural Municipality, Dhading - Queen Tripurasundari of Nepal
- Vyas – Sage Vyasadeva (Vyas)

=== Netherlands ===
- Anna Paulowna – Anna Pavlovna of Russia
- De Cocksdorp - Nicolaas Josephus de Cock (1804–1848), wealthy merchant and shipowner from Antwerp
- Elsendorp (North Brabant)]] - Father Gerlacus van den Elsen (1853–1925)
- Emmaberg – Queen Emma of Waldeck and Pyrmont
- Frederiksoord – Prince Frederick of the Netherlands
- Geertruidenberg – Gertrude of Nivelles
- 's-Gravenzande (lit. The Count's Sand) – William, King of the Romans (and Count of Holland)
- Helenaveen (North Brabant) - Maria Helena Hubertina Panis, wife of a co-founder
- Heerhugowaard – lord ('heer') Hugo of Assendelft
- 's-Hertogenbosch (lit. The Duke's Forest) – Henry I, Duke of Brabant
- Julianadorp – Queen Juliana of the Netherlands
- Klazienaveen - Klaaszien Sluis (1821–1893)
- Koningsbosch (lit. King's Forest) – Charles V, Holy Roman Emperor
- Koningsoord (Het Hogeland) – William III of the Netherlands
- Mariaparochie – Mary, mother of Jesus
- Nieuw-Namen - John I of Namur
- Lelystad – ir. Cornelis Lely
- Odiliapeel – Odilia of Cologne
- Oud-Beijerland, Nieuw-Beijerland and Zuid-Beijerland – Sabina, Duchess of Bavaria (Dutch: Sabina van Beieren)
- Philippine, Netherlands – Philip I of Castile
- Prins Alexander – Alexander, Prince of Orange
- Sint Annaparochie – Saint Anne
- Sint Jacobiparochie – James, son of Zebedee
- Sint Maarten – Martin of Tours
- Sint Nicolaasga – Saint Nicholas
- Sint-Oedenrode – Saint Oda
- Sint Pancras – Saint Pancras
- Sint Willebrord – Saint Willibrord
- Van Ewijcksluis – Daniël Jacob van Ewijck van Oostbroek van de Built (1786–1858), Dutch Politician
- Wilhelminadorp, Best – Queen Wilhelmina of the Netherlands
- Wilhelminadorp, Goes – Wilhelmine of Prussia, Queen of the Netherlands
- Wilhelminaoord – Wilhelmina of Prussia, Princess of Orange
- Willemsdorp – King William I of the Netherlands
- Willemsoord, Steenwijkerland – King William II of the Netherlands
- Willemstad, North Brabant – William the Silent, Father of the Dutch fatherland

=== New Zealand ===
- Addisons Flat, West Coast – unknown African American gold prospector
- Aidanfield – Mother Aidan Phelan (1858–1958)
- Albert Town – Prince Albert
- Alexandra – Alexandra of Denmark
- Allanton – James Allan
- Alfredton – Alfred, Duke of Saxe-Coburg and Gotha
- Andersons Bay – James Anderson and family
- Arthurs Point – Thomas Arthur
- Ashers – William Asher
- Ashburton – Francis Baring, Baron Ashburton
- Auckland – George Eden, Earl of Auckland
- Ballance – John Ballance
- Bell Block – Dillon Bell
- Benneydale – Matt Benney and Tom Dale
- Blaketown – Isaac Blake
- Brockville – Frederick Brock-Hollinshead
- Bronte – Admiral Lord Nelson, Duke of Bronté
- Brunner – Thomas Brunner
- Brydone – Thomas Brydone
- Buckleton Beach - John Graham Buckleton (1910-1996), property developer
- Bulls, New Zealand - James Bull, early postmaster
- Carterton – Charles Carter
- Charleston – Captain Charles Bonner
- Christchurch – Jesus Christ (indirectly via Christ Church, a college of the University of Oxford in England)
- Claris, New Zealand - William Holman (Bill) Claris, Public Works engineer who died in a plane crash of 1939
- Clarkville – Joseph Clark
- Clendon Park - James Reddy Clendon
- Clive – Robert Clive ("Clive of India")
- Clinton – Henry Pelham-Clinton, 5th Duke of Newcastle
- Clyde – Lord Clyde
- Coatesville – Gordon Coates, Prime Minister
- Cobden – Richard Cobden
- Collingwood – Admiral Cuthbert Collingwood
- Colville – Alexander Colville, 7th Lord Colville of Culross
- Cromwell – possibly Oliver Cromwell
- Dargaville – Joseph Dargaville
- Days Bay – George Day
- Dennison – R.B. Denniston
- Dobson – George Dobson
- Duders Beach – Thomas Duder
- Evansdale – William Evans
- Eyreton – Edward John Eyre
- Featherston – Isaac Featherston
- Feilding – William Feilding
- Fendalton – Walpole Chesshyre Fendall (1830–1913)
- Fordlands – Harry Ford (1878-1969)
- Foxton – William Fox, Premier
- Frankton – Frances Rees, wife of William Gilbert Rees
- Franz Josef / Waiau – Franz Joseph I of Austria
- Frasertown – Major James Fraser
- Gabriel's Gully – Gabriel Read
- Gisborne – William Gisborne
- Gladstone – William Ewart Gladstone
- Godley Head – John Robert Godley
- Gore – Thomas Gore Browne
- Greerton – Lieutenant-Colonel Henry Harpur Greer
- Grey River / Māwheranui, Greymouth, Greytown – George Grey, Governor
- Haast – Julius von Haast
- Halswell – Edmund Storr Halswell QC (1790–1874)
- Hamilton – John Fane Charles Hamilton
- Hampden – John Hampden
- Hanmer Springs – Thomas Hanmer
- Harrisville – Benjamin Harris
- Hastings – Warren Hastings
- Havelock – Henry Havelock
- Havelock North – Henry Havelock
- Helensville – Helen McLeod, wife of John McLeod
- Herbert - Sydney Herbert
- Herbertville - Joseph and Sarah Herbert
- Hinds – Samuel Hinds
- Hope – Jane Hope
- Hunterville – George Hunter
- Hyde – John Hyde Harris
- Invercargill – William Cargill
- Jack's Point – "Maori Jack" Tewa
- Jacksons – Michael Jackson
- Kennedys Bush – Thomas Kennedy
- Kimbell – Frederick J. Kimbell
- Levin – William Hort Levin
- Lincoln – Earl of Lincoln
- Linton – James Linton
- Lower Hutt – Sir William Hutt
- Lyell – Charles Lyell
- Lyttelton – the Lyttelton family
- Macraes – John MacRae
- Mackenzie Basin – James Mckenzie
- Mackenzie District – James Mckenzie
- Macetown – brothers Charles, Harry, and John Mace
- Mairtown – Gilbert Mair and family
- Martinborough – John Martin
- Massey – William Massey, Prime Minister
- Masterton – Joseph Masters
- Mauriceville – Maurice O'Rourke
- Maxwell (now Pākaraka) – Sergeant George Maxwell
- McLaren Park, New Zealand – Bruce McLaren
- Melville – James Dougal Melville (1841–1909)
- Mercer – Captain Henry Mercer
- Moncks Bay – John Stanley Monck
- Millers Flat – Walter Miller
- Murchison – Roderick Murchison
- Napier – Charles James Napier
- Nelson – Admiral Horatio Nelson
- Ormondville – John Davies Ormond
- Palmerston – Henry Temple, 3rd Viscount Palmerston
- Palmerston North – Henry Temple, 3rd Viscount Palmerston
- Picton – Thomas Picton
- Plimmerton – John Plimmer
- Port Albert – Prince Albert
- Port Chalmers – Thomas Chalmers
- Port Levy – Solomon Levey
- Port Underwood – Joseph Underwood
- Prestons – Thomas Herbert Preston
- Pyes Pa – Charles Pye, VC
- Queenstown – Queen Victoria
- Raglan – Lord Raglan
- Rātana Pā – T. W. Ratana
- Renwick – Thomas Renwick
- Ross – George Ross
- Saint Arnaud – Jacques Leroy de Saint-Arnaud
- Seddon – Richard Seddon, Prime Minister
- Seddonville – Richard Seddon, Prime Minister
- Sumner – John Bird Sumner
- Tasman – Abel Tasman
- Upper Hutt – Sir William Hutt
- Victoria – Queen Victoria
- Vogeltown – Julius Vogel, Premier
- Wakefield – Arthur Wakefield
- Waldronville – Bill Waldron (1909–1976)
- Ward – Joseph Ward
- Wellington – Duke of Wellington
- Wellsford – an acronym derived from the surnames of the first European families who settled in the region
- West Eyreton – Edward John Eyre
- Whitford – Richard Whitford
- Winton – Thomas Winton
- Wyndham – Charles Ash Windham

=== Nicaragua ===
- Ahmed Campos Correa (Chontales) – Ahmed Campos Correa (1956–1982), a Nicaraguan Poet
- Arlen Siu (Granada) – Arlen Siu, a guerrilla revolutionary heroine
- Bernardino Diaz Ochoa (Granada) – Bernadino Diaz Ochoa (1941–1971), a Nicaraguan peasant and revolutionary
- Bluefields – Abraham Blauvelt, a Dutch privateer, pirate and explorer of Central America in the 1630s
- Carazo Department – Evaristo Carazo, President of Nicaragua
- Cárdenas – Adán Cárdenas, President of Nicaragua
- Ciudad Darío – Rubén Darío, Nicaraguan poet
- Ciudad Sandino – Revolutionary Augusto César Sandino
- El Viejo – Cacique Agateyte
- Filiberto Morales (Chinandega) – Filiberto Morales Darce (d.1979)
- German Pomares (Jinotega), German Pomares (Nueva Segovia) – German Pomares Ordonez (1936–1979), a Nicaraguan national hero
- Greytown, Nicaragua – Charles Edward Grey, a British judge and colonial governor
- Gaspar García (Rivas) – Gaspar García Laviana
- Hilario Sanchez (Managua) – Hilario Sánchez Vásquez (1953–1983), a Nicaraguan military
- Jesus Rivera (Jinotega) – Manuel de Jesus Rivera "La Mascota" (1965–1978), a Nicaraguan revolutionary kid
- Jose Benito Escobar (Matagalpa) and Jose Benito Escobar (South Caribbean Coast Autonomous Region) – Jose Benito Escobar (1936–1978), revolutionary
- La Concepción, Masaya – Immaculate Conception of Mary
- Larreynaga – Miguel Larreynaga, Nicaraguan philosopher
- Leon Diaz (Jinotega) – General José León Diaz, Salvadoran military of one of 30 militaries during the Nicaraguan Revolution
- Leonel Rugama (Estelí) – José Leónel Rugama (1949–1970), Nicaraguan poet
- Macario Brenes (Masaya) – Macario Brenes Alvarez (died in 1979)
- Madriz Department – José Madriz, President of Nicaragua
- Marlon Zelaya (Rio San Juan) – Marlon Zelaya Cruz (1962–1983), a student martyr
- Monseñor Madrigal (Nueva Segovia) – Monseñor Nicolás Antonio Madrigal y García (1898–1977)
- Pablo Ubeda (Boaco) – Rigoberto Cruz (died in 1967), also known as Pablo Ubeda, one of the founders of the FSLN
- Padre Ramos (Chinandega) – Father Francisco Ramos, Nicaraguan priest
- Puerto Benjamín Zeledón – Benjamín Zeledón, national hero of Nicaragua
- Puerto Cabezas – Rigoberto Cabezas, journalist, military figure and politician
- Puerto Diaz, Chontales – Adolfo Díaz, President of Nicaragua
- Puerto Morazán – Francisco Morazán, a Honduran Politician
- Puerto Salvador Allende (Managua) – Salvador Allende
- Ricardo Morales Avilés (Granada) – Ricardo Morales Avilés (1939–1973)
- Rigoberto López Pérez (Managua) – Rigoberto López Pérez, Nicaraguan poet
- Rivas Department – Patricio Rivas, President of Nicaragua
- Rivas, Nicaragua – Francisco Rodriguez de Rivas (1674–1743), Captain General of Guatemala
- Roman Esteban Toledo (Carazo) – Roman del Carmen Esteban Toledo (1950–1979), revolutionary
- Rubén Darío (South Caribbean Coast Autonomous Region) – Rubén Darío
- San Dionisio, Matagalpa – Dionisio de Herrera, president of Nicaragua
- San Fernando, Nueva Segovia – King Ferdinand III of Spain
- San Francisco Chontales (Villa Sandino) – Rev. Frank Setzer (1911–2000)
- San Francisco del Norte – Saint Francis
- San José de Cusmapa – José Dolores Estrada
- San José de los Remates – José María Guerrero de Arcos, director of the State of Nicaragua
- San Lorenzo de los Tellez – Saint Lawrence and Josefa Tellez, owner of a small farm in the vicinity of the area
- Santa Lucía, Boaco – Saint Lucy
- Santa María, Nueva Segovia – Saint Mary
- San Nicolás, Estelí – Saint Nicholas
- San Pedro del Norte – Saint Peter
- San Ramón, Matagalpa – Saint Raymond Nonnatus
- Santa Teresa, Carazo – Saint Teresa of Ávila
- Santo Tomás del Norte – Tomás Ruiz Romero (1777–1819), Priest and independence hero
- Socrates Sandino (Masaya) – Socrates Sandino Tiffer (1875–1935), a Sandino's paternal brother
- Villa Carlos Fonseca – Carlos Fonseca, founder of the Sandinista National Liberation Front
- Villa Sandino – revolutionary Augusto César Sandino

=== Niger ===
- Cité Fayçal (Niamey) – Faisal of Saudi Arabia

=== Nigeria ===
- Port Harcourt – Lewis Vernon Harcourt, 1st Viscount Harcourt
- Sardauna, Taraba State - Ahmadu Bello, Sardauna of Sokoto
- Suleja - Sulaimanu Barau
- Victoria Island, Lagos – Queen Victoria

=== North Korea ===
- Kimchaek – Korean People's Army (KPA) general, Kim Chaek
- Kimhyonggwon County – Korean revolutionary Kim Hyong-gwon
- Kimhyongjik County – Korean independence activist Kim Hyong-jik
- Kimjongsuk County – Korean anti-Japanese guerrilla and Kim Il-sung's first wife Kim Jong-suk
- Mundok County - Ŭlchi Mundŏk

=== North Macedonia ===
- Čučer-Sandevo – Aleksandar Urdarevski-Sande (1920–1943), participant in the National Liberation War
- Dame Gruev (Skopje) – Dame Gruev
- Delčevo – Goce Delčev, revolutionary hero
- Gazi Baba Municipality – Ottoman poet Aşık Çelebi
- Gjorče Petrov Municipality – revolutionary Gjorče Petrov
- Jane Sandanski (Skopje) – Yane Sandanski
- Josifovo – Josif Josifovski (1915–1943)
- Sveti Nikole – Saint Nicholas
- Titov Vrv – Josip Broz, President of Yugoslavia

Former:

- Titov Veles (meaning: "Tito's Veles") was the name of Veles – Josip Broz

=== Norway ===
- Barentsburg - Willem Barentsz
- Edgeøya – Thomas Edge
- Emma Hjorth, Norway - Emma Hjorth, Norwegian educator
- Eydehavn – Sam Eyde, an industrial pioneer
- Filipstad, Norway – pharmacist Philip Moth
- Fredrikstad – King Frederick II of Denmark and Norway
- Hiorthhamn - Fredrik Hiorth
- Jan Mayen – Captain Jan Jacobszoon May van Schellinkhout
- Kongsberg – King Christian IV of Denmark and Norway
- Kongsvinger – King Christian V of Denmark and Norway
- Kristiansand – King Christian IV of Denmark and Norway
- Kristiansund – King Christian VI of Denmark and Norway
- Longyearbyen – world's northernmost town – John Munro Longyear
- Olonkinbyen - Gennady Olonkin

Former:

- Christiania (from 1624 through 1877) and then Kristiania (from 1877 through 1925) were the names of Oslo – King Christian IV of Denmark and Norway
- Fredrikshald was the name of Halden from 1665 through 1928 – King Frederick III of Denmark and Norway
- Fredriksvern was the name of Stavern from 1799 through 1930 – King Frederick V of Denmark and Norway
- Victoriahavn was the name of Narvik from 1887 through 1902 – Crown princess of Norway, Victoria of Baden

=== Oman ===
- Al-Mazyunah - Mazoon bint Ahmad Al Mashani, Sultan Qaboos bin Said Al Said's mother
- Madinat Al Sultan Qaboos – Qaboos bin Said
- Sultan Haitham City - Haitham bin Tariq, current Sultan of Oman

=== Pakistan ===
- Abbottabad – James Abbott
- Aliabad, Hunza – Ali, cousin of Muhammad
- Aziz Bhatti Town – Raja Aziz Bhatti, Pakistani military officer
- Bahawalnagar – Bahawal Khan V
- Bahawalpur – Nawab Mohammad Bahawal Khan Abbasi (1715–1749)
- Bulri Shah Karim Tehsil - Shah Abdul Karim Bulri
- Chowk Sarwar Shaheed Tehsil – Raja Muhammad Sarwar, Pakistani army officer
- Dera Allah Yar – Political Leader Mir Allahyar Khan Khosa (d.1985)
- Dera Ismail Khan – Ismail Khan
- Dera Murad Jamali – Mir Muhammad Murad Jamali, an assassinated Pakistani leader
- Faisalabad – King Faisal of Saudi Arabia
- Fatehpur Thakiala – Sardar Fateh Muhammad Khan Karelvi (d.1988)
- Fort Abbas – Abbas Abbasi, Amir of the Bahawalpur State and former governor of Punjab
- Haripur, Pakistan – Hari Singh Nalwa
- Haroonabad, Bahawalnagar – Sahibzada Muhammad Haroon-ur-Rashid Ahmad Abbasi (1924–1972), son of Nawab of Bahawalpur sir Sadeq Mohammad Khan V
- Hayatabad – Hayat Sherpao
- Iqbal Town, Lahore – Muhammad Iqbal, Pakistani national poet
- Jacobabad – John Jacob
- Jafarabad District – Jafar Khan Jamali, a Muslim League veteran from Balochistan
- Jamalabad Gojal – Jamal of Hunza
- Jamshed Town – Jamshed Nusserwanjee Mehta, first elected Mayor of Karachi
- Jauharabad – Mohammad Ali Jauhar, one of several prominent leaders of the Pakistan Movement
- Jinnahabad (Abbottabad) – Muhammad Ali Jinnah, Father of the nation
- Khairpur Nathan Shah – Sufi Saint Hazrat Nathan Shah (d.1983)
- Killa Saifullah District - Saifullah Khan Khoidadzai (1827-1899), brave chief of the Sanzerkhel Kakar tribe.
- Kot Chutta - Chutta Khan Gurmani
- Kot Ghulam Muhammad – Ghulam Muhammad Khan Bhurgri, one of the pioneers of the Pakistan Movement
- Latifabad - Shah Abdul Latif Bhittai
- Liaquatabad Town and Liaquatpur – Liaquat Ali Khan, Pakistani statesman
- Minchinabad – Colonel Charles Cherry Minchin (1829–1899), British political Agent
- Miranshah – Miran Shah
- Mir Ali, Pakistan - Mirza Ali Khan Wazir (Faqir of Ipi)
- Muzaffarabad – Sultan Raja Muzaffar Khan
- Muzaffargarh – Nawab Muzaffar Khan (d.1818), Afghan Popalzai governor of Multan
- Nankana Sahib – Guru Nanak
- Nasirabad District – Muhammad Nasir Khan I (1710–1794), ruler of Kalat
- Nazimabad – Khawaja Nazimuddin, Governor-General of Pakistan
- Nishtar Town – Abdur Rab Nishtar, a Pakistan movement leader
- Phool Nagar – Phool Muhammad Khan, former Minister of the area
- Pindi Bhattian - Dulla Bhatti
- Port Qasim – Muhammad bin Qasim, an Arab Commander
- Qilla Abdullah – Ghazi Abdullah Khan Achakzai, (1788-1841), Pashtun tribal leader and commander during the First Anglo-Afghan War
- Quaidabad – Muhammad Ali Jinnah
- Rahim Yar Khan – Crown Prince Rahim Yar Khan (1877–1881), who died by burns in a fire
- Rajanpur – Makhdoom Sheikh Rajan Shah
- Sadiqabad – Amīr Sadiq Mohammad Khan V
- Safdarabad – Safdar-Ul-Haq Dogar (d.1989)
- Shaheed Benazirabad District – Shaheed Benazir Bhutto, a two-time prime minister of Pakistan
- Shaheed Fazil Rahu – Fazil Rahu
- Sheikhupura – Jahangir's nickname Shekhu
- Shujabad – Nawab Shuja Khan
- Sohbatpur District - Sardar Sohbat Khan Gola (1858–1930), Chief of the Gola truibe
- Tando Muhammad Khan – Mir Muhammad Khan Talpur Shahwani
- Toba Tek Singh – Tek Singh, Sikh religious figure

Former:

- Edwardesabad was the name of Bannu – Sir Herbert B. Edwardes
- Fort Sandeman was the name of Zhob – Sir Robert Sandeman
- Lyallpur was the name of Faisalabad – Alfred Comyn Lyall
- Montgomery was the name of Sahiwal – Sir Robert Montgomery

=== Panama ===
- Alcalde Díaz – Mauricio Díaz Garcés (1901–1972), former mayor of Panama
- Almirante, Bocas del Toro – Altamirante Christopher Columbus
- Amador, Panama – Manuel Amador Guerrero, first President
- Amelia Denis de Icaza (corregimiento) – Panamanian romantic poet Amelia Denis de Icaza
- Antón – Antón Rodrigo Cuadrado, Spanish entourage pilot
- Arnulfo Arias, Panama – Arnulfo Arias, president of Panama
- Arosemena, Panama – Pablo Arosemena
- Belisario Frías - Belisario Frías (1915-1985), pioneer and creator of San Miguelito district
- Belisario Porras, Panama – Belisario Porras Barahona, president of Panama
- Candelario Ovalle (Cocle) - Candelario Ovalle, rural teacher
- Carlos Santana Ávila – Carlos Santana Ávila, former legislator of Panameñista Party and founder of Expreso Veragüense
- Colón – Christopher Columbus
- Chepigana – Cacique Chepi
- Chepo – Cacique Chepori
- David, Chiriquí – King David
- Edwin Fábrega – Panamanian politician Edwin Fábrega Velarde (1929–1983)
- Ernesto Córdoba Campos – Ernesto Córdoba Campos (1935-1999), former deputy and Governor of Panama Province
- Feuillet, Panama – Panamanian poet Tomás Martín Feuillet
- General Victoriano Lorenzo (Cocle) - Victoriano Lorenzo
- Gonzalo Vásquez – Captain Gonzalo Vásquez
- Herrera (corregimiento) – Tomás de Herrera
- Hurtado, Panama - Manuel José Hurtado, father of Panamanian education
- José Domingo Espinar – Panamanian patriot José Domingo Espinar (1791–1865)
- Juan Demóstenes Arosemena, Panama – Juan Demóstenes Arosemena, president of Panama
- Juan Díaz, Panama City – Juan Díaz, spanish soldier
- Justo Fidel Palacios – Justo Fidel Palacios (1956–1987), panamanian journalist
- Los Díaz – General Domingo Díaz
- Manuel E. Amador Terrero (Veraguas) – Manuel Encarnación Amador (1869–1952), designer who created the flag of Panama
- Manuel Ortega, Emberá – Professor Manuel Ortega (d.1983)
- Mateo Iturralde – General Mateo Iturralde
- Mendoza, Panama – Carlos A. Mendoza, former president
- Obaldía, Panama – José Domingo de Obaldía
- Omar Torrijos, Panama – Commander Omar Torrijos
- Omar Torrijos Herrera District (Colón) – Omar Torrijos, Leader of the Panamanian Revolution
- Parque Lefevre – Ernesto Tisdel Lefevre
- Pedasí, Los Santos – Cacique Peazi
- Penonomé, Coclé – Cacique Nomé
- Pinogana – Cacique Pino
- Puerto Armuelles – Colonel Tomás Armuelles, hero of the Coto War who died of a train accident
- Puerto Obaldía – José Domingo de Obaldía, President of Panama
- Puerto Vidal – father superior Francisco Xavier Vidal
- Purio – Cacique Puri
- Río de Jesús - Jesus
- Rodolfo Aguilar Delgado – Rodolfo Aguilar Delgado (1939–1963), trade unionist leader
- Rodrigo Luque (Veraguas) - Rodrigo Luque (1957-2005), former baseball player and mayor of Santiago de Veraguas
- Rubén Cantú, Panama – American pilot Rubén Cantú (1922–1967)
- Rufina Alfaro, Panama – Panamanian revolutionary Rufina Alfaro
- San Carlos, Panamá Oeste - Charles Borromeo
- San Félix, Chiriquí - Saint Felix of Nola
- San Juan de Dios (Coclé, Panama) - John of God
- San Lorenzo, Chiriquí - Saint Lawrence
- San Miguel, Panamá Province - Saint Michael
- Santa Clara, Chiriquí - Claire of Assisi
- Santo Domingo, Chiriquí - Saint Dominic
- Santiago de Veraguas - James the Great
- Victoriano Lorenzo, Panama – Panamanian revolutionary Victoriano Lorenzo
- Villa Carmen, Panama – Carmen Madrid de Arias (d.1943), mother of Arnulfo Arias
- Villa Rosario - Rosario Guardia Vieto de Arias (1891–1987), wife of Harmodio Arias Madrid

=== Papua New Guinea ===
- Alexishafen – Grand Duke Alexei Alexandrovich of Russia
- Duke of York Rural LLG – Prince Edward, Duke of York and Albany
- Finschhafen – Otto Finsch
- Gloucester Rural LLG – Prince Henry, Duke of Gloucester
- Goodenough Island Rural LLG – James Graham Goodenough
- Gurney (Alotau) – Charles Raymond Gurney
- Hatzfeldhafen – Paul von Hatzfeldt
- Heldsbach – German missioner Friedrich Held, who died of malaria in 1901
- Lake Murray Rural LLG – Hubert Murray, Lieutenant-Governor of Papua
- Louisiade Rural LLG – Louis XV of France
- Marienberg Rural LLG – Marie von Bismarck (1848–1926)
- Markham District – Clements Markham
- Milne Bay Province – Sir Alexander Milne, 1st Baronet
- Morehead Rural LLG – Boyd Dunlop Morehead, Premier of Queensland
- Mount Hagen – Curt von Hagen (1859–1897)
- Mount Wilhelm Rural LLG – Wilhelm von Bismarck
- Port Moresby – Admiral Sir Fairfax Moresby
- Queen Carola Harbour – Carola of Vasa
- West Ferguson Rural LLG – Sir James Fergusson, 6th Baronet

=== Paraguay ===
- Alberdi, Paraguay – Juan Bautista Alberdi, Argentine writer
- Ayolas - Juan de Ayolas
- Benjamín Aceval, Paraguay – Tomas Benjamin Aceval (1845–1900), a Paraguayan diplomat
- Capitán Bado – José Matías Bado, an army officer
- Capitán Carmelo Peralta – Carmelo Peralta (1910–1940), paraguayan aviator
- Capitán José Bozzano (Presidente Hayes) - José Bozzano
- Capitán Mauricio José Troche – Mauricio José Troche (liberator)
- Capitán Meza – Pedro Ignacio Meza (1813–1865)
- Capitán Miranda - Emeterio Miranda (1910-1935), Chaco War Hero
- Carlos Antonio López, Paraguay - Carlos Antonio López, First President
- Col.Juan Sinforiano Bogarin (Caaguazu) – Juan Sinforiano Bogarín, Archbishop of Paraguay
- Coronel Arturo Bray (Presidente Hayes) - Arturo Bray (1898-1964), Paraguayan military
- Coronel Bogado – Jose Felix Bogado, a Paraguayan Hero
- Coronel Oviedo – Florentin Oviedo, a hero of Paraguayan war
- Doctor Cecilio Báez – Cecilio Báez, president of Paraguay
- Doctor Eulogio Estigarribia – Juan Eulogio Estigarribia, lawyer and politician
- Doctor Juan León Mallorquín District – Juan León Mallorquín (1880–1947), President of Supreme court of Justice
- Doctor Juan Manuel Frutos – Juan Manuel Frutos, President of Paraguay
- Doctor Moisés Bertoni – Moisés Santiago Bertoni, a Swiss naturalist
- Doctor Pedro P. Peña – Pedro Peña, President of Paraguay
- Doctor Raúl Peña, Paraguay – Carlos Raúl Peña del Molino Torres (1904–1984), a former president Pedro Peña's son
- Domingo Martínez de Irala, Paraguay - Domingo Martínez de Irala
- Edelira – Edelira Barthe Cueto (1884–1921)
- Eusebio Ayala – Eusebio Ayala, President of Paraguay
- Escobar, Paraguay – Patricio Escobar, President of Paraguay
- Félix Pérez Cardozo, Paraguay - Félix Pérez Cardozo, musician
- Fernando de la Mora, Paraguay – Fernando de la Mora (politician), a father of Paraguayan independence from Spain
- Fortín Pratts Gill (Boquerón) - Salvador Pratts Gill (1909-1934)
- Fortín Sargento Primero Ladislao Bustamante Rodríguez (Boquerón) - Ladislao B. Rodríguez (1915-2002), Chaco War hero
- General Artigas – Uruguayan national hero, José Gervasio Artigas
- General Delgado – Jose Maria Delgado, a military of Paraguayan war
- General Elizardo Aquino – Elizardo Aquino, a hero of Paraguayan war
- General Eugenio A. Garay – Eugenio Alejandrino Garay (1874–1937), a Paraguayan military and journalist
- General Francisco Álvarez – Francisco Caballero Alvarez (1896–1958), Paraguayan military
- General Higinio Morínigo – Higinio Morínigo, President of Paraguay
- General Isidoro Resquín – Francisco Isidoro Resquín, Hero of Paraguayan war
- General José Eduvigis Díaz – José Eduvigis Díaz, a Hero of Paraguayan war
- General Patricio Colmán (Alto Paraná) – Patricio Colmán Martinez (1911–1972)
- Hernandarias District – Hernando Arias de Saavedra, a Spanish conquistador
- José Fassardi – Giusseppe Fassardi (1866–1940), Italian businessman
- José Ocampos – Jose Domingo Ocampos (1885–1993), founder
- Juan Emilio O'Leary – Juan Emiliano O'Leary (1879–1969), Paraguayan journalist, poet, historian, and politician
- Juan R. Chavez (Caaguazu) – Juan Ramon Chavez (1901–1995)
- Julián Augusto Saldívar – Julian Augusto Saldivar Viera (1896–1987), Paraguayan diplomat
- Luque - Miguel Antón de Luque
- Mariano Roque Alonso – Mariano Roque Alonso, a consul of the republic
- Mariscal Estigarribia – Marshall José Félix Estigarribia, President of Paraguay
- Mariscal Francisco Solano López – Francisco Solano López, Second President of Paraguay
- Mayor José Dejesús Martínez – Jose Dejesus Martinez, a hero of Paraguayan war
- Mayor Otaño - Major Julio Dionisio Otaño (1907-1936), Chaco War Hero
- Natalio - Natalio, indigenous landowner
- Obligado - Pastor S. Obligado (1841-1924), Argentine lawyer and politician
- Pedro Juan Caballero – Pedro Juan Caballero
- Presidente Franco District – Manuel Franco, President of Paraguay
- Puerto Casado – Carlos Casado del Alisal, founder of the Santa Fe Western Railway company
- Puerto Pinasco, Paraguay - Santiago Pinasco (1868-1937), Argentine businessman and politician and former Mayor of Rosario
- Raúl Arsenio Oviedo – Raúl Arsenio Oviedo (d.1960), Paraguayan politician who was killed by the guerrillas who faced the Stroessner's regime
- Regina Marecos (Cordillera) - Regina Marecos (d.1989), Paraguayan peasant leader
- San Alberto, Paraguay – Capt. Alberto Fernandez Valenzuela (1906–2005), a captain of the Paraguayan navy
- San Alfredo – Alfredo Stroessner, President of Paraguay
- San Carlos, Paraguay - Charles III of Spain
- San Lázaro – Capt. Lazaro Aranda (1873–1945), founder
- Sargento José Félix López – José Félix López Pesoa (1860–1870), Paraguayan child martyr who died at Battle of Cerro Corá
- Teniente Esteban Martínez – Teniente Esteban Martínez (d.1932), Hero of the Chaco war
- Teniente Primero Manuel Irala Fernández – Manuel Irala Fernández (1893–1979), Hero of the Chaco war
- Tomás Romero Pereira, Paraguay – Tomás Romero Pereira, President of Paraguay
- Valenzuela, Paraguay – father Antonio Fernandez de Valenzuela
- Villa Elisa, Paraguay – Elisa von Poleski (1866–1946)
- Villa Florida - José Moñino, 1st Count of Floridablanca
- Villa Hayes – Rutherford Hayes, US president
- Yegros – Fulgencio Yegros, Paraguayan soldier and first head of state of independent Paraguay

Former:

- Doña Heriberta Stroessner de Iglesias was the name of Alto Verá – Heriberta Stroessner de Iglesias, Alfredo Stroessner's sister
- Domingo Robledo was the name of Natalio – Domingo Robledo (1911–1972), Intendent of Encarnacion
- Fortin Lopez de Filippis was the name of Mariscal Estigarribia – Captain Cesar Lopez de Filippis, Paraguayan military who died during the Chaco War in 1933
- Puerto Presidente Stroessner was the name of Ciudad del Este – Alfredo Stroessner

=== Peru ===
==== Amazonas ====
- Condorcanqui Province – Túpac Amaru II (also known as Jose Gabriel Condorcanqui), a leader of a large Andean uprising
- Mariscal Benavides District – Oscar Benavides, Peruvian field marshal, diplomat, and politician who served twice as the President of Peru
- Mariscal Castilla District, Chachapoyas - Marshall and President Ramón Castilla
- Rodríguez de Mendoza Province – Toribio Rodríguez de Mendoza, Peruvian priest, educator, and key ideological precursor of Peru's independence

==== Áncash ====
- Antonio Raymondi Province – Antonio Raimondi, Italian-born Peruvian geographer, scientist, explorer, and naturalist
- Abelardo Pardo Lezameta District - Abelardo Pardo Lezameta, prominent politician from Chiquián
- Bolognesi Province – Francisco Bolognesi, hero of the Battle of Arica
- Carlos Fermín Fitzcarrald Province – Carlos Fermín Fitzcarrald, Peruvian rubber baron and explorer during the late-19th-century rubber boom
- Cáceres del Perú District – 19th-century Peruvian president Andrés Avelino Cáceres
- Comandante Noel District - Commander Juan Noel Lastra (1813-1854), a heroic Peruvian naval officer
- Eleazar Guzman Barron District – Dr. Eleazar Guzmán Barrón (1899–1957), Peruvian physician, biochemist, and researcher who gained international recognition for his work in cellular biochemistry and atomic energy
- Fidel Olivas Escudero District – Fidel Olivas Escudero (1850–1935), Peruvian Catholic bishop, educator, journalist, writer, and politician
- Mariscal Luzuriaga Province – Peruvian marshal and Argentine general Toribio de Luzuriaga

==== Apurimac ====
- Grau Province – Rafael Grau (1876–1917), Peruvian lawyer and politician who was assassinated in 1917
- José María Arguedas District – José María Arguedas, Peruvian novelist, poet and anthropologist
- Juan Espinoza Medrano District – Juan Espinoza Medrano, 17th-century Indigenous or mestizo cleric, writer, dramaturge, theologian, and polymath from the Viceroyalty of Peru
- Justo Apu Sahuaraura District – Justo Sahuaraura Inca, Peruvian independence hero
- Mariscal Gamarra District – President Agustín Gamarra
- Micaela Bastidas District – Micaela Bastidas Puyucahua, a martyr for Peruvian independence and wife of Túpac Amaru II

==== Arequipa ====
- Deán Valdivia District – Juan Gualberto Valdivia Cornejo (1796–1884), Arequipa-born priest, historian, lawyer, and political leader
- Jacobo Hunter District – Dr. Jacob Dixon Hunter (1837–1926), US-born physician of Scottish descent who became a celebrated medical benefactor in Arequipa
- José Luis Bustamante District – President Jose Luis Bustamante
- José María Quimper District – José María Químper (1828–1902), Minister of the Interior
- Mariano Melgar District – Mariano Melgar, Peruvian patriot, poet, artist and warrior
- Mariano Nicolás Valcárcel District – Mariano Valcárcel, Peruvian lawyer and politician who served as Prime Minister of Peru
- Nicolás de Piérola District – President Nicolás de Piérola
- Samuel Pastor District - Dr. Samuel Pastor Caballero (1829–1909), Camaná-born lawyer and philanthropist

==== Ayacucho ====
- Carmen Salcedo District - Carmen Salcedo, a local benefactor and matriarch associated with the founding and civic development
- Coronel Castañeda District – Colonel Jose Maria Castañeda, Parinacochas-born military leader who fought for Peruvian independence
- La Mar Province – José de La Mar, President of Peru
- María Parado de Bellido District – María Parado de Bellido, Peruvian indigenous revolutionary
- Sucre Province – Antonio José de Sucre, Grand Marshal of Ayacucho
- Víctor Fajardo Province – Colonel Victor Fajardo

==== Cajamarca ====
- Jorge Chávez District – Jorge Chávez, Peruvian aviator
- Miguel Iglesias District – Miguel Iglesias, Peruvian soldier, general, and politician, 35th President of Peru

==== Cuzco ====
- Espinar Province – Ladislao Espinar Carrera (1842–1879), hero of Cusco
- Héctor Tejada - Héctor Tejada Pacheco (1880–1938), Peruvian landowner and politician
- Túpac Amaru District – Túpac Amaru II

==== Huancavelica ====
- Castrovirreyna – Doña Teresa de Castro, wife of García Hurtado de Mendoza
- Centro Poblado Túpac Amaru - Túpac Amaru II
- Daniel Hernández District – Daniel Hernández Morillo
- Mariscal Cáceres District, Huancavelica - Marshall and President Andrés Avelino Cáceres

==== Huánuco ====
- Daniel Alomías Robles District – Daniel Alomía Robles, Peruvian compositor
- Hermilio Valdizán District – Dr. Hermilio Valdizán, Peruvian physician
- José Crespo y Castillo District – Juan José Crespo y Castillo, Peruvian independence hero
- Leoncio Prado Province - Peruvian mariner Leoncio Prado Gutiérrez
- Mariano Dámaso Beraun District – Mariano Dámaso Beraun (1813–1894), Peruvian physician and educator
- Tournavista District - R. G. LeTourneau

==== Ica ====
- Grocio Prado District – José Santos Grocio Prado Linares (1857–1880), hero of the Battle of the Peak of the Alliance
- Pachacútec District – Pachacuti
- Salas District, Ica – Juan José Salas, Peruvian independence hero
- Tupac Amaru Inca District – Túpac Amaru II

==== Junín ====
- Heroínas Toledo District – María e Higinia Toledo and their mother Cleofé Ramos, heroines of Peruvian independence
- Leonor Ordóñez District - Leonor Ordóñez, Peruvian guerrilla fighter, partisan and heroine of thw War of the Pacific
- Mariscal Castilla District, Concepción – Marshall and president Ramón Castilla

==== La Libertad ====
- Bolívar, Peru – Simón Bolívar
- Florencia de Mora District - Florencia de Mora Pizarro, 16th-century colonial philanthropist
- Salaverry District - President Felipe Santiago Salaverry
- Sánchez Carrión Province – José Faustino Sánchez Carrión, pro-independence politician from Peru
- Víctor Larco Herrera District – Victor Larco Herrera, Peruvian philanthropist

==== Lambayeque ====
- José Leonardo Ortiz District - José Leonardo Ortiz Salcedo (1782–1854), Chiclayo-born independence leader and statesman
- Manuel Antonio Mesones Muro District – Manuel Antonio Mesones Muro, Ferreñafe-born explorer and geographer
- Pimentel District - Ricardo Pimentel Casariego (1830-1910), a 19th-century Peruvian naval captain and merchant

==== Lima ====
- Cañete Province – Andrés Hurtado de Mendoza, 3rd Marquis of Cañete
- Leoncio Prado District, Huaura – Peruvian mariner Leoncio Prado Gutiérrez
- Olof Palme (Lima) - Olof Palme, Swedish prime minister
- Ricardo Palma District – Ricardo Palma, Peruvian author, scholar, librarian and politician
- Villa María del Triunfo – María Delgado de Odría (1900–1990), First Lady of Peru
- Zúñiga District – Diego López de Zúñiga, 4th Count of Nieva

==== Loreto ====
- Capelo District - Joaquín Francisco Lucio Capelo Ruiz (1852–1928), Peruvian civil engineer, sociologist, educator, and politician.
- Emilio San Martín District – Emilio San Martín (1861–1880), Peruvian national hero
- Fernando Lores District – Fernando Lores Tenazoa (1906–1933), hero of the Colombia–Peru War
- Grau (Nauta) – Miguel Grau, Peruvian naval officer and national hero
- Jenaro Herrera District – Genaro Herrera (1861–1939), lawyer, narrator and politician
- Jose Olaya (Nauta) – José Olaya, Peruvian independence hero
- Mariscal Ramón Castilla province – Marshall Ramón Castilla, President of Peru
- Padre Marquez District – Father Buenaventura Márquez
- Requena Province – Francisco Requena y Herrera, Governor of Maynas
- Rosa Panduro District – Carmen Rosa Panduro (1918–1989), Peruvian housewife who participated in the Ecuadorian–Peruvian War
- Sargento Elmer Pacaya (Nauta) – Sargent Elmer Pacaya del Águila (1966–1983)
- Soplin District - Alejandro Soplin Mori (1917-2001), founder
- Teniente Cesar Lopez Rojas District – César Augusto López Rojas (1915–1941)
- Teniente Manuel Clavero District – José Manuel Sixto Clavero Muga (1879–1911), hero killed in a battle on the Colombian border
- Vargas Guerra District – Alfredo Vargas Guerra (1910–1933)
- Víctor Raúl (Nauta) – Víctor Raúl Haya de la Torre

==== Madre de Dios ====
- Fitzcarrald District – Carlos Fermín Fitzcarrald
- Malinowski - Ernest Malinowski, Polish civil engineer and builder of Central Trans-Andean Railway company
- Puerto Maldonado – Faustino Maldonado Ruíz (1820-1861), Peruvian explorer

==== Moquegua ====
- General Sánchez Cerro Province – President Luis Miguel Sánchez Cerro, former Peruvian army officer
- Mariscal Nieto Province – Marshall and President Domingo Nieto

==== Pasco ====
- Daniel Alcides Carrión Province – medical student Daniel Alcides Carrión
- Puerto Bermúdez District – President Remigio Morales Bermúdez
- Simón Bolívar District, Peru - Simón Bolívar

==== Piura ====
- Castilla District – Marshall and President Ramón Castilla
- Fernando Belaunde (Piura) – President Fernando Belaunde Terry
- Gustavo Mohme Llona (Piura) – Gustavo Mohme Llona, businessman and politician
- Ignacio Escudero District – Ignacio Escudero y Valdivieso (1820-1866), Peruvian patrician
- Miguel Checa District – Don Miguel Checa y Checa (1861–1935), Peruvian politician who built the "Casa de Sojo" in 1910

==== Puno ====
- José Domingo Choquehuanca District – José Domingo Choquehuanca (1794–1854), Peruvian lawyer and politician
- Juan Velasco Alvarado (Melgar) – Juan Velasco Alvarado, Peruvian general
- Melgar Province – Mariano Melgar, Peruvian patriot, poet, artist and warrior
- Pedro Vilca Apaza District – Pedro Vilca Apaza (1741–1782), Quechua indigenous rebel leader
- San Román Province – Miguel de San Román President of Peru

==== San Martin ====
- Alberto Leveau District - Corporal Alberto Leveau García, Tarapoto-born soldier who died defending Peru during the 1941 Ecuadorian–Peruvian War
- Alonso de Alvarado District – Alonso de Alvarado, Spanish conquistador
- Elías Soplín Vargas District – Elías Soplín Vargas (1909–1933), Peruvian national hero
- Mariscal Cáceres Province – 19th-century Peruvian president Andrés Avelino Cáceres
- San Martín Province – José de San Martín, Argentine general, Protector of Peru

==== Tacna ====
- Coronel Gregorio Albarracín Lanchipa District – Colonel Gregorio Albarracín (1817–1882)
- Héroes Albarracín District - Colonel Gregorio Albarracín and his son, Second Lieutenant (Alférez) Rufino Albarracín, who died defending Peru during the War of the Pacific in 1882
- Inclán District - José Joaquín Inclán (1818-1880), Peruvian military officer and hero of the Battle of Arica
- Jorge Basadre Province – Jorge Basadre Grohmann (1903-1980), Peru's most celebrated modern historian

==== Tumbes ====
- Contralmirante Villar Province – Contralmirante Manuel Villar Olivera, Peruvian mariner
- José Abelardo Quiñones (Tumbes) - José Abelardo Quiñones

==== Ucayali ====
- Coronel Portillo Province – Pedro Portillo, Peruvian military officer, explorer and Prefect of Loreto
- Irazola District – Francisco Irazola (1869–1945), Spanish explorer
- Padre Abad Province – Father Francisco Alonso de Abad, 18th-century Spanish Franciscan missionary and explorer
- Raimondi District - Antonio Raimondi, Italian-born Peruvian geographer, scientist, explorer, and naturalist

=== Philippines ===
- Aurora – Aurora Quezon, First Lady of the Philippines
- Dasmariñas, Cavite – Gómez Pérez Dasmariñas, Governor-General of the Philippines (1590–1593)
- General Santos – General Paulino Santos, Commanding General of the Philippine Army (1936–1938) and Governor of Lanao (1936–1939)
- General Trias – Mariano Trías, Filipino revolutionary considered to be the first de facto Vice President of the Philippines
- Isabela, Basilan – Queen Isabella II of Spain
- Isabela Province – Queen Isabella II of Spain
- Lapu-Lapu, Cebu – Lapu-Lapu
- Legazpi, Albay – Miguel López de Legazpi
- Quezon – Manuel L. Quezon, President of the Philippines
- Quezon City – Manuel L. Quezon, President of the Philippines
- Quirino – Elpidio Quirino
- Rizal – José Rizal, National hero
- Roxas, Capiz – Manuel Roxas, President of the Philippines
- San Lorenzo Ruiz, Camarines Norte – Lorenzo Ruiz
- San Pablo, Laguna – St. Paul the First Hermit
- San Pedro, Laguna – St. Peter the Apostle
- Santa Rosa, Laguna – St. Rose of Lima
- Santiago – Saint James the Apostle
- Sultan Kudarat – Sultan Muhammad Dipatuan Kudarat
- Trece Martires – Thirteen Martyrs of Cavite
- Valenzuela – Pío Valenzuela

=== Poland ===
- Aleksandrów Kujawski – Emperor Alexander II Romanov, benefactor of the town
- Aleksandrów Łódzki – Emperor Alexander I Romanov
- Augustów – King Sigismund II Augustus, founder
- Baborów – Bavor ze Strakonic, founder
- Barczewo – Walenty Barczewski (1858–1928), Polish Catholic priest
- Bemowo – Józef Bem, national hero
- Bemowo-Lotnisko – Józef Bem, national hero
- Bodzentyn – Jan Bodzanta, founder
- Boernerowo - Ignacy Boerner (1875-1933), Minister of Post and Telegraphs
- Bolesławiec – Duke Bolesław the Pious, founder
- Chomiczówka – Bolesław Chomicz (1878-1959) and Józef Chomicz (1887-1943), founders, businesspeople
- Dzierżoniów – Jan Dzierżon, Polish apiarist, discovered the parthenogenesis of bees
- Fort Bema – Józef Bem, national hero
- Fosowskie - Arnold Heinrich Voss (1753-1838)
- Giżycko – Gustaw Gizewiusz, political figure
- Janów – Jan Aleksander Koniecpolski, founder
- Janów Lubelski – Jan Zamoyski, son of founder
- Jordanów – Spytek Wawrzyniec Jordan (1518-1568), founder
- Józefów – Tomasz Józef Zamoyski, founder
- Kazimierz Dolny – Duke Casimir II the Just, donor of the town to the Order of Norbertines
- Kętrzyn – Wojciech Kętrzyński, historian
- Kolonowskie –Philipp Graf Colonna (1755-1807), founder
- Konstancin – Konstancja Skórzewska (1839-1910), mother of a founder
- Konstantynów Łódzki – Grand Duke Constantine Romanov
- Korfantów – Wojciech Korfanty, Deputy Prime Minister of Poland
- Łaskarzew – Andrzej Łaskarz, founder
- Łaszczów – Aleksander Łaszcz, founder
- Lubecki Colony – Franciszek Ksawery Drucki-Lubecki, politician and diplomat
- Mariensztat – Maria Potocka, co-founder and landowner
- Mieszkowice – Duke Mieszko I
- Mirów – Wilhelm Mier, military officer and statesman
- Mrągowo – Krzysztof Celestyn Mrongowiusz, Protestant pastor
- Pieniężno – Seweryn Pieniężny (1890–1940), journalist
- Platerówka – Emilia Plater, national heroine
- Przemków – Duke Przemko of Ścinawa, founder
- Rejowiec – Mikołaj Rej, founder
- Rembertów – Friedrich Wilhelm Rembert von Berg
- Sobków – Stanisław Sobek (d.1568), founder
- Sokołowsko – Alfred Sokołowski, resident and benefactor of the town
- Srokowo – Stanisław Srokowski, geographer and diplomat
- Szczuczyn – Stanisław Antoni Szczuka, founder
- Szlichtyngowa – Jan Jerzy Szlichtyng (1591-1658), founder
- Tarnobrzeg – Stanisław Tarnowski (starost of Krzeszów), founder
- Tarnogród – Stanisław Tarnowski (starost of Krzeszów), founder
- Terespol – Teresa Korwin Gosiewska, wife of a founder
- Tomaszów Lubelski – Tomasz Zamoyski, owner and benefactor of the town, son of founder
- Tomaszów Mazowiecki – Tomasz Adam Ostrowski, founder
- Ursynów – Julian Ursyn Niemcewicz
- Wejherowo – Jakub Weyher, founder
- Władysławowo – King Wladislaus IV Vasa, founder of the town's port
- Załuski – Andrzej Chryzostom Załuski, founder, statesman, and bishop
- Zaklików – Stanisław Zaklika Czyżowski (d.1574), founder
- Zawadzkie – Franciszek von Zawadzky (1791-1849), founder
- Żyrardów – Philippe de Girard, co-founder

==== Former ====
- Aleksandrowo was the initial name of Gościnowo – Aleksander Zborowski, founder
- Bierutowice was the name of Karpacz Górny (now part of Karpacz) 1949–1991 – Bolesław Bierut, President of the Republic of Poland
- Hermannsbad was the name of Ciechocinek 1939–1945 – Hermann Göring
- Hindenburg was the name of Zabrze 1915–1945 – Paul von Hindenburg
- Iwanogród was the name of Dęblin 1842–1915 – Ivan Paskevich
- Litzmannstadt was the name of Łódź 1940–1945 – Karl Litzmann
- Löwenstadt was the name of Brzeziny 1943–1945 – Karl Litzmann
- Nowa Aleksandria was the name of Puławy 1846–1916 – Emperor Alexander I Romanov
- Nowogeorgiewsk was the name of Modlin Fortress 1834–1915 – Saint George
- Schröttersburg was the name of Płock 1941–1945 – Friedrich von Schrötter
- Stalinogród was the name of Katowice 1953–1956 – Joseph Stalin

=== Portugal ===
- Aldeia de João Pires (Castelo Branco) – João Pires, landowner and agricultural owner
- Aldeia de Paio Pires – Paio Peres Correia
- Almargem do Bispo – Bishop Miguel de Castro (1536–1625)
- Caldas da Rainha – Queen Eleanor of Viseu
- Aldeia de São Francisco de Assis - Francis of Assisi
- Casal de Álvaro (Aveiro) – Álvaro da Cunha, Lord of Pombeiro
- Costa Cabral (Porto) – António Bernardo da Costa Cabral, 1st Marquis of Tomar
- Doutor Augusto de Castro (Lisboa) – Augusto de Castro (1883–1971), lawyer, diplomat and politician
- Doutor Mário Madeira (Lisboa) – Mário Lampreia de Gusmão Madeira (1901–1985), former governor of Lisboa
- Fernão Ferro – Fernão Ferro Peres
- Fernão Joanes (Guarda) – Fernão Joanes, local figure of the village
- Figueira de Castelo Rodrigo – count Rodrigo González Girón
- Gomes Aires (Beja) – Gomes Aires, first lord of the area
- Gomes da Costa (Porto) – Manuel Gomes da Costa
- Granja do Marquês (Sintra) – Sebastião José de Carvalho e Melo, 1st Marquis of Pombal
- Guerra Junqueiro (Porto) – Guerra Junqueiro
- Guimarães – Vímara Peres
- Lisbon (Latin, Olisipo, Olisipo Felicitas Iulia, Felicitas Julia Olissipo, Ulyssipolis, Ulisseia) – Ulysses
- Marechal Carmona (Lisboa) – Óscar Carmona, President
- Marques de Pombal (Lisboa) – Sebastião José de Carvalho e Melo, 1st Marquis of Pombal
- Montijo e Afonsoeiro – King Afonso I of Portugal
- Norton de Matos (Coimbra) – José Norton de Matos, a Portuguese general and politician
- Nossa Senhora da Expectação (Portalegre) – Mary, mother of Jesus (Our Lady of Expectation)
- Porto Moniz – Francisco Moniz
- Padre Cruz (Lisbon) – Francisco Rodrigues da Cruz, Portuguese priest
- Paio Mendes (Ferreira do Zêzere) – Paio Mendes
- Penha Garcia (Castelo Branco) – D. Garcia Mendes, former landowner of the town
- Rainha D. Leonor (Albufeira) – Eleanor of Viseu
- Samora Correia (Santarém) – Paio Peres Correia
- Santa Joana (parish) – Joanna, Princess of Portugal
- Santo Aleixo da Restauração – Alexius of Rome
- Santo Condestável, Lisbon – Nuno Álvares Pereira
- Santo Isidoro, Marco de Canaveses – Isidore of Seville
- São João de Brito, Lisbon – John de Britto
- São Pedro de Solis (Beja) – Saint Peter
- São Vicente, Madeira – Vincent of Saragossa
- Vale de Afonsinho – Afonso I of Portugal
- Vila Boa do Bispo – D. Sisnando, bishop of Porto
- Vila do Bispo – Bishop Fernando Coutinho
- Vila do Conde – Mumadona Dias
- Vila Fernando (Elvas) - D. João Fernandes de Lima, landowner
- Vila Fernando (Guarda) – Ferdinand I of Portugal
- Vila Nova da Rainha (Tondela) – Queen Amelia of Orleans
- Vila Real – King Denis of Portugal
- Vila Real de Santo António – Joseph I of Portugal

=== Qatar ===
- Umm Salal Ali – Ali bin Jassim Al Thani (1893-1972), a son of Qatar's former ruler
- Umm Salal Mohammed – Sheikh Mohammed bin Jassim Al Thani

=== Romania ===
- Ady Endre – Endre Ady, Hungarian poet
- Alexandria – Alexandru II Ghica, Prince of Wallachia
- Alexandru Odobescu, Călărași – Alexandru Odobescu, writer and politician
- Avram Iancu, Alba and Avram Iancu, Bihor – Avram Iancu
- Bucharest – Bucur, legendary shepherd
- C. A. Rosetti, Buzău, C. A. Rosetti, Tulcea – Constantin Alexandru Rosetti, liberal Wallachian politician
- Ciprian Porumbescu, Suceava – Ciprian Porumbescu
- Constanța – Flavia Julia Constantia, sister of Constantine the Great
- Constantin Daicoviciu, Caraș-Severin – Constantin Daicoviciu, Romanian historian (died 1973)
- Costache Negri, Galați – Costache Negri, revolutionary
- Costinești – Emil Costinescu, Minister of Finance and landowner
- Cuza Vodă, Călărași, Cuza Vodă, Constanța, Cuza Vodă, Galați – Alexandru Ioan Cuza, Prince of Moldavia
- Dragalina, Călărași – General Ion Dragalina
- General Berthelot – Henri Mathias Berthelot, French general
- George Enescu, Botoșani – George Enescu, Romanian composer
- Gheorghe Doja, Ialomița – György Dózsa, a Székely from Transylvania
- Gheorghe Lazăr, Ialomița – Gheorghe Lazăr, Romanian scholar
- Giurgiu – Saint George
- Horia, Constanța, Horia, Neamț, Horia, Tulcea – Vasile Ursu Nicola (known as Horea)
- I. C. Brătianu, Tulcea – Ion C. Brătianu, Prime Minister of Romania
- Ion Corvin, Constanța – John Hunyadi
- Ion Creangă, Neamț – Ion Creangă
- Ion Roată, Ialomița – Ion Roată, a Romanian peasant and political figure
- Medgidia – Abdülmecid I
- Mihai Eminescu, Botoșani – Mihai Eminescu
- Mihail Kogălniceanu, Constanța, Mihail Kogălniceanu, Ialomița, Mihail Kogălniceanu, Tulcea – Mihail Kogălniceanu, Prime Minister of Romania
- Mihai Viteazu, Cluj, Mihai Viteazu, Constanța – Michael the Brave
- Mircea Vodă, Brăila, Mircea Vodă, Constanța – Mircea I of Wallachia
- Moldovenești – Ioan Micu Moldovan, a Romanian professor
- Nicolae Bălcescu, Bacău, Nicolae Bălcescu, Călărași, Nicolae Bălcescu, Constanța, Nicolae Bălcescu, Vâlcea – Nicolae Bălcescu
- Nicolae Titulescu, Olt – Nicolae Titulescu, a Romanian diplomat and politician
- Negru Vodă – probably Radu Negru
- Onești – Stephen the Great's daughter, Oana
- Ovidiu – Ovid
- Petru Rareș, Bistrița-Năsăud – Petru Rareș
- Roman – Roman I of Moldavia
- Saligny, Constanța – Anghel Saligny
- Sfântu Gheorghe, Sfântu Gheorghe, Tulcea – Saint George
- Ștefan cel Mare, Argeș, Ștefan cel Mare, Călărași, Ștefan cel Mare, Neamț, Ștefan cel Mare, Olt, Ștefan cel Mare, Vaslui, Ștefan cel Mare, Bacău – Stephen III of Moldavia
- Traian, Bacău, Traian, Brăila, Traian, Ialomița, Traian, Olt, Traian, Teleorman – Trajan
- Traian Vuia, Timiș – Traian Vuia, Romanian inventor and aviator
- Tudor Vladimirescu, Brăila, Tudor Vladimirescu, Galați – Tudor Vladimirescu
- Victor Vlad Delamarina, Timiș – Victor Vlad Delamarina, Romanian poet
- Vlad Țepeș, Călărași, Vlad Țepeș, Giurgiu – Vlad the Impaler

Former:

- Stalin was the name of Brașov – Joseph Stalin
- Vasile Roaită was the name of Eforie Sud – Vasile Roaită, a communist shot during the Grivița strike of 1933
- Ferdinand I was the name of Mihail Kogălniceanu, Constanța – Ferdinand I of Romania
- Gheorghe Gheorghiu-Dej was the name of Onești – Gheorghe Gheorghiu-Dej, communist leader
- Dr. Petru Groza was the name of Ștei – Petru Groza, Prime Minister of Romania

=== Russia ===
- Akhmat-Yurt – Akhmad Kadyrov, President of the Chechen Republic
- Alexandrovsk-Sakhalinsky – Emperor Alexander II of Russia
- Aslanbek-Sheripovo (Chechenia) – Aslanbek Sheripov (1897–1919), revolutionary leader
- Andropovsky District – Yuri Andropov, President
- Babushkin – Ivan Babushkin, revolutionary leader
- Bagrationovsk – Pyotr Bagration
- Borisoglebsk – Saints Boris and Gleb
- Budyonnovsk – Marshall Semyon Budyonny
- Chaykovsky – Pyotr Ilyich Tchaikovsky, composer
- Chekhov – Anton Chekhov, playwright
- Chernokozovo – Khrisanf Pavlovich Chernokozov (1885–1966)
- Chernyakhovsk – General Ivan Chernyakhovsky
- Chersky – Polish paleontologist and explorer Jan Czerski
- Chertkovo, Rostov Oblast – General Mikhail Ivanovich Chertkov (1829–1905)
- Demidov – Bolshevik leader Yakov Demidov
- Dikson – Scottish-Swedish explorer Oscar Dickson
- Dimitrovgrad – Georgi Dimitrov, Bulgarian communist leader and also as a Prime Minister of Bulgaria
- Dmitrov – Saint Demetrius
- Dzerzhinsk – Felix Dzerzhinsky, politician
- Engels – Friedrich Engels, philosopher
- Furmanov – Dmitry Furmanov, author
- Gagarin – Yury Gagarin, cosmonaut
- Georgiyevsk – Saint George
- Gorodovikovsk – General Oka Gorodovikov
- Guryevsk, Kaliningrad Oblast – Major General Stepan Guryev
- Guryevsk, Kemerovo Oblast – Dimitri Alexandrovich Guryev, Minister of Finance
- Imeni Poliny Osipenko (rural locality) – Polina Osipenko, military pilot
- Ivangorod – Tsar Ivan III of Russia
- Kaliningrad – Mikhail Kalinin, President
- Khabarovsk – explorer of Siberia Yerofey Khabarov
- Kingisepp – Bolshevik Viktor Kingissepp, Estonian communist revolutionary
- Kirov – Sergey Kirov, bolshevik leader
- Kirovgrad – Sergey Kirov
- Kirovsk – Sergey Kirov
- Korolyov – rocket engineer Sergey Korolyov
- Kotovsk – Grigore Kotovski, politician
- Kropotkin – Peter Kropotkin, anarcho-communist philosopher
- Kuznetsovo, Chukhlomsky District, Kostroma Oblast – Vasili Kuznetsov (politician)
- Kuybyshevo, Rostov Oblast – Commander Nikolay Kuibyshev
- Leninsk-Kuznetsky – Vladimir Lenin, Russian politician
- Leninogorsk – Vladimir Lenin
- Lermontov – Mikhail Lermontov, writer and poet
- Lev Tolstoy (rural locality) – Leo Tolstoy, writer
- Lomonosov – writer and scientist Mikhail Lomonosov
- Makarov – Stepan Makarov, Imperial Russian naval officer and oceanographer
- Makhachkala – Daghestani revolutionary, Magomed-Ali 'Makhach' Dakhadaev (1882–1918)
- Mamonovo – Nikolay Vasilyevich Mamonov
- Mariinsk – Empress Maria Alexandrovna (Marie of Hesse)
- Mariinsky Posad – Empress Maria Alexandrovna (Marie of Hesse)
- Marks – Karl Marx, philosopher
- Mayakovskoye – Vladimir Mayakovsky, poet
- Michurinsk – selectionist Ivan Michurin
- Millerovo, Millerovsky District, Rostov Oblast – army officer Ivan Abramovich Müller
- Muravlenko – Viktor Muravlenko (1912–1977), engineer
- Nagurskoye – Polish pioneer of aviation Jan Nagórski
- Novoalexandrovsk – Emperor Alexander I of Russia
- Novokuybyshevsk – Valerian Kuybyshev, revolutionary
- Nesterov – Stepan Kuzmich Nesterov (1906–1944)
- Nevelsk – Gennady Nevelskoy, navigator
- Noginsk – Bolshevik leader Viktor Nogin
- Pavlovsk – Emperor Paul I
- Petropavlovsk-Kamchatsky – Apostles Saint Peter and Saint Paul
- Petrovsk, Saratov Oblast – Peter the Great, Father of the Russian fatherland
- Petrozavodsk – Tsar Peter the Great
- Prokopyevsk – Prokopiy of Ustug
- Pushkin – Aleksandr Pushkin, writer
- Rostov-na-Donu – Dimitry of Rostov
- Saint Petersburg – St. Peter, as the patron saint of Peter the Great (St. Petersburg, Florida in the United States was in turn named after the Russian city)
- Salavat – Salawat Yulayev
- Sergiyev Posad – St. Sergii Radonezhsky
- Shelekhov – Grigory Shelikhov, marine
- Sholokhovsky District – Mikhail Sholokhov, novelist
- Stakhanovets and Stakhanovo (Tula) – Alexey Stakhanov, miner
- Tolyatti (or Togliatti) – Palmiro Togliatti, Italian politician
- Ulyanovsk – Vladimir Lenin, whose birth name was Ulyanov
- Voroshilovka (Smolensk) and Voroshilovo – Kliment Voroshilov
- Yaroslavl – Prince Yaroslav I the Wise
- Yekaterinburg, Russia – Saint Catherine of Alexandria and Empress Catherine I of Russia
- Zhukov, Kaluga Oblast – Georgy Zhukov, Military leader
- Zhukovsky – Nikolay Zhukovsky, scientist, a founding father of modern aero- and hydrodynamics.

Former:

- Andropov was the name of Rybinsk – Yuri Andropov, Chairman of the Presidium of the Supreme Soviet
- Brezhnev was the name of Naberezhnye Chelny – Leonid Brezhnev, General Secretary of the Communist Party of the Soviet Union
- Chernenko was the name of Sharypovo – Konstantin Chernenko, General Secretary of the Communist Party of the Soviet Union
- Gorky was the name of Nizhny Novgorod – Maxim Gorky
- Chkalov was the name of Orenburg – aircraft test pilot Valery Chkalov
- Georgiu Dezh was the name of Liski – Romanian communist Gheorghe Gheorghiu-Dej
- Kalinin was the name of Tver – Mikhail Kalinin, Chairman of the Presidium of the Supreme Soviet of the Soviet Union
- Königsberg was the name of Kaliningrad – King Ottokar II, "the Iron", of Bohemia
- Kuybyshev was the name of Samara – Valerian Kuybyshev
- Leningrad was the name of Saint Petersburg – Vladimir Lenin
- Molotov was the name of Perm – Vyacheslav Molotov
- Novonikolaevsk was the name of Novosibirsk – Emperor Nicholas II
- Ordzhonikidze was the name of Vladikavkaz – Sergo Ordzhonikidze
- Petrovsk-Port was the name of Makhachkala – Peter the Great
- Stalingrad was the name of Volgograd – Joseph Stalin
- Stalinogorsk was the name of Novomoskovsk – Joseph Stalin
- Stalinsk was the name of Novokuznetsk – Joseph Stalin
- Sverdlovsk was the name of Yekaterinburg – Yakov Sverdlov
- Ustinov was the name of Izhevsk – Marshal Dmitry Ustinov
- Voroshilov was the name of Ussuriysk – Kliment Voroshilov
- Yekaterinodar was the name of Krasnodar – Catherine the Great

=== Saint Kitts and Nevis ===
- Charlestown, Nevis – Charles II of England

=== Saint Lucia ===
- Castries – Charles Eugène Gabriel de La Croix, Marquis de Castries, French Marshal
- Rodney Bay – British naval officer George Brydges Rodney

=== Saint Vincent and the Grenadines ===
- Charlestown, Saint Vincent and the Grenadines – Charles II of England
- Georgetown, Saint Vincent and the Grenadines – George III the United Kingdom
- Port Elizabeth, Saint Vincent and the Grenadines – Queen Elizabeth II

=== São Tomé e Príncipe ===
- Agostinho Neto (São Tomé) – Agostinho Neto, Angolan President

=== Saudi Arabia ===
- Al Aziziah (Riyadh) - Ibn Saud
- Al Faisaliyyah (Riyadh) - Faisal of Saudi Arabia
- Al-Khalidiah (Riyadh) - Khalid of Saudi Arabia
- Hotat Khalid - Khalid of Saudi Arabia
- King Abdul Aziz Port – Ibn Saud
- King Abdullah District - Abdullah of Saudi Arabia
- King Abdullah Economic City – Abdullah of Saudi Arabia
- King Khalid Military City – Khalid of Saudi Arabia
- Prince Abdulaziz Bin Mousaed Economic City - Abdulaziz bin Musa'ed Al Jiluwi
- Salah al-Din (Riyadh) - Saladin

=== Senegal ===
- Djily Mbaye (Dakar) – El Hadj Djily Mbaye (1927–1991)
- Médina Yoro Foulah - Yoro Foulah, a respected regional leader
- Mermoz-Sacré-Cœur - Jean Mermoz
- Richard Toll – Jean Michel Claude Richard, French botanist
- Saint-Louis – Louis XIV of France

=== Serbia ===
- Aleksa Šantić – Aleksa Šantić, poet
- Aleksandrovac – King Alexander I of Serbia
- Andrićev Venac – Ivo Andrić
- Bajina Bašta – Baja Osman
- Blok Sava Kovačević – Partisan World War II war hero Sava Kovačević
- Braće Jerković – Nebojša and Dušan Jerković
- Bosilegrad – King Busil
- Čelarevo – Commander Zdravko Čelar, Serbian national hero
- Despotovac – Despot Stefan Lazarević
- Dimitrovgrad – Georgi Dimitrov, Prime Minister of Bulgaria
- Donji Milanovac – Milan Obrenović II, Prince of Serbia
- Dr Ivan Ribar – Doctor Ivan Ribar, President of Yugoslavia
- Gornji Milanovac – Milan Obrenović II, Prince of Serbia
- Jaša Tomić – Jaša Tomić, journalist
- Kačarevo – Svetozar Kačar, Serbian national hero
- Karađorđevo – Karađorđe, Father of the Serbian Fatherland
- Kljajićevo – Miloš Kljajić, Serbian national hero
- Knićanin – Stevan Knićanin, Serbian military commander
- Kraljevo – Milan I of Serbia
- Kruščić – Vukman Kruŝĉić, Serbian national hero
- Lazarevac – Prince Lazar Hrebeljanovic
- Lekino Brdo – Aleksandar Ranković
- Lukićevo – Veljko Lukić, Serbian farmer and national hero
- Miletićevo – Svetozar Miletić, advocate, journalist, author, politician
- Minićevo – Milun Minić, Serbian national hero
- Mladenovo – Mladen Stojanović
- Nikola Tesla (Niška Banja) – Nikola Tesla, Serbian-American inventor, electrical and mechanical engineer
- Obilić – Miloš Obilić, a Serbian knight
- Obrenovac – Miloš Obrenović, Prince of Serbia
- Petrovac, Serbia – Milutin Petrović, Serbian revolutionary
- Putinovo – Vladimir Putin, President of Russia
- Radoševo – Radoš Bojović, Serbian national hero
- Ratkovo – Ratko Pavlović, Serbian fighter
- Sava Kovačević, Zemun – Partisan World War II hero Sava Kovačević
- Svetozar Miletić (village) – Svetozar Miletić
- Tomislavci – Tomislav of Yugoslavia
- Tošin Bunar – Teodor Toša Apostolović (1745–1810), Serbian merchant and philanthropist
- Zrenjanin – Žarko Zrenjanin, National Hero of Yugoslavia

Former:

- Svetozarevo was the name of Jagodina – Svetozar Marković
- Rankovicevo was the name of Kraljevo – Aleksandar Ranković
- Titova Mitrovica was the name of Kosovska Mitrovica – Josip Broz Tito
- Titovo Užice was the name of Užice – Josip Broz Tito

=== Seychelles ===
- Mahé – largest island in the country, named after Bertrand-François Mahé de La Bourdonnais, the French naval officer
- Victoria – capital of Seychelles, named after Queen Victoria

=== Sierra Leone ===
- Aberdeen, Sierra Leone – George Hamilton-Gordon, 4th Earl of Aberdeen
- Bureh Town – Bai Bureh, a Sierra Leonean pro independent leader
- Charlotte, Sierra Leone – Princess Charlotte of Wales
- Granville Town, Province of Freedom – Granville Sharp
- Newton, Sierra Leone – British abolitionist John Newton
- Ricketts, Sierra Leone – Henry Ricketts
- Samuel Town, Sierra Leone – Pa Samai, great Mende warrior from the south of Sierra Leone
- Wellington, Freetown – Arthur Wellesley, 1st Duke of Wellington

=== Singapore ===
- Alexandra, Singapore – Alexandra of Denmark
- Balestier – Joseph Balestier
- Clementi, Singapore – Cecil Clementi
- MacPherson, Singapore – Lieutenant Colonel Ronald MacPherson (1837–1869)
- Mountbatten, Singapore – Lord Louis Mountbatten
- Mount Faber – Captain Charles Edward Faber
- Mount Vernon, Singapore – British Royal Navy Vice Admiral Edward Vernon
- Newton, Singapore – Alfred Howard Vincent Newton
- Queenstown, Singapore – Queen Elizabeth II
- Thomson, Singapore – John Turnbull Thomson

=== Slovakia ===
- Bernolákovo – Anton Bernolák, Slovak linguist and Catholic priest
- Bohúňovo – Peter Michal Bohúň, Slovak painter
- Bottovo – Ján Botto, Slovak poet
- Bratislava – Braslav, Duke of Lower Pannonia
- Gabčíkovo – Jozef Gabčík, a Slovak soldier involved in Operation Anthropoid
- Golianovo – Ján Golian, Slovak Brigade General
- Hamuliakovo – Martin Hamuljak (1789-1859), Slovak writer
- Hurbanovo – Jozef Miloslav Hurban, Slovak writer and national leader
- Hviezdoslavov – Pavol Országh Hviezdoslav, Slovak poet
- Jánošíková (Dunajská Lužná) - Anton Jánošík (1904-1971), Slovak linguist
- Jesenské – Janko Jesenský, Slovak writer
- Kalinkovo – Joachim Kalinka (1601–1678), Slovak poet and priest
- Kalinčiakovo - Ján Kalinčiak (1822-1871), Slovak author
- Kolárovo - Ján Kollár, Slovak writer
- Kmeťovo – Andrej Kmeť, Slovak scientist
- Koceľovce – Koceľ, Prince of Lower Pannonia
- Kraskovo, Slovakia - Ivan Krasko, Slovak poet
- Kubáňovo – Ľudovít Kubáni (1830-1869), Slovak writer
- Kukučínov – Martin Kukučín, Slovak writer
- Leopoldov – Leopold I, Holy Roman Emperor
- Malinovo, Slovakia – Rodion Malinovsky, Soviet Marshal
- Martin – Saint Martin of Tours
- Matúškovo – Janko Matúška, Slovak poet
- Michalovce – Saint Michael
- Mojmírovce – Mojmír I, Moravian prince
- Mojzesovo – Štefan Moyses, Slovak priest and national leader
- Mudroňovo – Ján Mudroň (1866-1926), Slovak politician
- Nálepkovo – Ján Nálepka, anti-fascist Slovak captain
- Palárikovo – Ján Palárik (1822–1876), Slovak playwright
- Rastislavice – Rastislav of Moravia, ruler of Great Moravia
- Sasinkovo – František Víťazoslav Sasinek (1830-1914), Slovak historian
- Sládkovičovo – Andrej Sládkovič, Slovak poet
- Šrobárová – Vavro Šrobár, Slovak politician
- Štefanovičová – Samuel Dobroslav Štefanovič (1822-1910), Slovak national leader
- Štúrovo – Ľudovít Štúr, 19th-century Slovak national leader
- Svätoplukovo – Svätopluk, Prince of Moravia
- Tešedíkovo – Samuel Tešedík (1742–1820), Slovak Lutheran priest
- Tomášikovo – Samo Tomášik, Slovak poet
- Veľké Blahovo – Matúš Blaho (1777-1837), Slovak national leader
- Záborské – Jonáš Záborský, Slovak writer

Former:

- Gessayov was the name of Zálesie – Ignác Gessay (1874-1928), Slovak-American journalist
- Hodžovo was the name of Lipové – Milan Hodža, Slovak politician
- Palkovičovo was the name of Sap – Juraj Palkovič (1769–1850), Slovak writer and teacher
- Sklenárovo was the name of Mierovo – Juraj Sklenár, Slovak historian and teacher
- Slávikovo was the name of Orávka – Juraj Slávik (1890-1969), Slovak politician
- Šafárikovo was the name of Tornaľa – Pavol Jozef Šafárik, Slovak writer
- Štefánikovce was the name of Rovinka – Milan Rastislav Štefánik, Slovak general and politician
- Švermovo was the name of Telgárt – Jan Šverma, Czech communist politician

=== Slovenia ===
- Josipdol, Ribnica na Pohorju - Joseph II, Holy Roman Emperor
- Kidričevo – Boris Kidrič, Prime Minister of Slovenia
- Primoži – Primož Trubar, Father of the Slovenian nation
- Sveti Andrej, Moravče - Andrew the Apostle
- Sveti Jernej, Slovenske Konjice - Bartholomew the Apostle
- Sveti Jurij, Rogašovci - Saint George
- Sveti Lenart, Cerklje na Gorenjskem - Leonard of Noblac
- Sveti Štefan, Šmarje pri Jelšah - Saint Stephen
- Sveti Vid, Cerknica - Saint Vitus
- Šentilj v Slovenskih Goricah - Saint Giles

Former:

- Titovo Velenje was the name of Velenje – Josip Broz Tito

=== Solomon Islands ===
- Vouza Village (Guadacanal) - Jacob C. Vouza, native police officer and World War II hero

=== Somalia ===
- Beled Hawo - Hawo Osman Gurey (1901-2011), founder
- Qoryoley - Ahmed Qoryoley, founder

Former:

- Bandar Qassim was the name of Bosaso – named after city's founder Qassim
- Villaggio Duca degli Abruzzi was the former name of Jowhar – named after HRH Prince Luigi Amedeo, Duke of the Abruzzi of Savoy

=== South Africa ===
- Benoni – the original name of the Biblical Benjamin
- Durban – Sir Benjamin d'Urban
- Johannesburg – Johannes Rissik; Johannes Meyer
- Pietermaritzburg – Two theories exist.
  - In the theory officially accepted today by the city, it bears the name of Voortrekker leaders Piet Retief and Gert Maritz.
  - In another theory, the city was originally named after Retief alone, initially "Pieter Mouriets Burg" (after his given names) and transformed to its current form.
- Port Elizabeth – Elizabeth Donkin (wife of acting governor Sir Rufane Shaw Donkin)
- Pretoria – Andries Pretorius
- Stellenbosch – Simon van der Stel

=== South Korea ===
- Apgujeong-dong - Han Myŏnghoe
- Chungjeongno-dong - Min Yŏnghwan
- Chungmu-ro – Admiral Yi Sun-sin
- Danwon-gu – Gim Hongdo
- Dasan-dong - Chŏng Yagyong
- Dosan-dong - Ahn Chang Ho (Dosan), President of South Korea
- Euljiro – General Ŭlchi Mundŏk
- Gim You-jeong Literature Village - Gim Yujeong, novelist
- Maeheon-dong - Yun Bong-gil (Maehon), Korean independence activist
- Sejong City – Sejong the Great
- Toegye-ro - Yi Hwang, Korean philosopher, writer, and Confucian scholar of the Joseon period

=== South Sudan ===
- Deim Zubeir - Al-Zubayr Rahma Mansur
- Tumbura - Tambura (d.1914), ruler of Avongura dynasty
- Yambio - Gbudwe, Azande King

=== Spain ===
- Alar del Rey – Charles IV of Spain
- Alberche del Caudillo – Francisco Franco
- Alcázar del Rey – Alfonso VIII of Castile
- Alcázar de San Juan – John the Baptist (indirectly)
- Alcocero de Mola – General Emilio Mola
- Alcubilla del Marqués (Soria) - Diego Fernández de Velasco, Marquis of Berlanga
- Aldea Moret (Cáceres) - Segismundo Moret, Prime Minister of Spain
- Alfonso XIII (Seville) – King Alfonso XIII of Spain
- Alonso de Ojeda (Miajadas) – Alonso de Ojeda
- Alvarado (Badajoz) – Pedro de Alvarado
- Arenas del Rey – Alfonso XII of Spain
- Arganda del Rey – Philip II of Spain
- Argüelles (Madrid) – Agustín Argüelles, a Spanish liberal politician
- As Pontes de García Rodríguez – Count García Rodríguez de Valcárcel, Galician knight and noble
- Barcelona (Carthaginian: Barcino) – Hamilcar Barca (etymology disputed)
- Belmonte de Gracián – Baltasar Gracián y Morales
- Benalúa (Alicante) - José Carlos de Aguilera, IV Marquis of Benalúa (1848-1900)
- Betancuria – Jean de Béthencourt
- Cáceres, Spain – Julius Caesar
- Calatrava la Vieja (Arabic: قلعة رباح, romanized: Qalʿat Rabāḥ) – 'Fortress of Rabah,' named after an Arab nobleman who held the area
- Cancelada (Estepona) - María Francisca de Paula de Tovar y Pueguera Amat de la Gasca (1803-1871), IV Countess of Cancelada
- Casares, Málaga – Julius Caesar
- Casas de Benítez – Gines Benitez, founder
- Casas de Don Pedro – Peter of Castile
- Casas de Fernando Alonso – Fernando Alonso, clergyman and founder
- Cascón de la Nava (Palencia) - José Cascón Martínez (1852-1930), agronomic researcher and director of the Palencia Agricultural Farm
- Casillas de Flores - Pedro Alfonso de Flores y Montenegro (1587-1664), 1st Viscount of Peñaparda de Flores
- Castrillo de Don Juan – Juan Delgadillo de Avellaneda, Lord of Castrillo de Don Juan
- Céspedes (Córdoba) - Pablo de Céspedes
- Chillarón del Rey – Alfonso VIII of Castile
- Ciudad Ducal (Ávila) - Ángela Pérez de Barradas y Bernuy (1827-1903), Duchess of Medinaceli
- Ciudad Quesada, Alicante - Justo Quesada Samper (1926-2010), entrepreneur and property developer
- Ciudad Rodrigo – Count Rodrigo González Girón
- Col. Carlos Haya (Badajoz) - Carlos de Haya González (1902-1938), aviator
- Colonia Güell (Catalonia) - Eusebi Güell
- Cristina, Badajoz - Christina of Bolsena
- Don Álvaro – Álvaro de Luna, Grand Master of the Order of Santiago
- Don Benito – D. Benito, son of Conde of Medellín
- Doña Mencía – Mécia Lopes de Haro, Wife of captain Alvaro Perez de Castro
- Dos Hermanas – Two sisters of Gonzalo Nazareno, Elvira and Estefania Nazareno
- El Cubo de Don Sancho – Sancho IV of Castile
- El Puente del Arzobispo – Pedro Tenorio (bishop)
- El Puerto de Santa María – Saint Mary
- El Valle de Altomira (formerly known as Puebla de Don Francisco) – Francisco Ruiz-Jarabo (1901–1990), Minister of Justice
- Emperador, Spain - Agustín Emperador, a prominent merchant
- Espinoso del Rey – Philip II of Spain
- Estella del Marqués (Cádiz) - Fernando Primo de Rivera, Marquis of Estella
- Fernán Caballero, Ciudad Real – Ferrant Cavallero, knight in the Reconquista
- Fernán Núñez – Fernán Núñez de Témez, IV Master of the Order of Alcántara
- Fuente la Reina – Eleanor of Portugal, Queen of Aragon
- Fuentes de Valdepero - Pedro Ansúrez, Lord of Valladolid
- Girón (Valladolid) – José Antonio Girón, Minister of labor
- Góngora (Córdoba) - Luis de Góngora, poet
- Guadalema de los Quintero (Seville) – Quintero brothers, Spanish dramatists
- Hermisende – Ermesinda, Queen consort of the Kingdom of Asturias
- Hernán Cortés (Badajoz) – Hernán Cortés
- Hinojosa del Duque – Francisco Sotomayor, duke of Belalcázar
- Infanta Isabel (Cáceres) - Infanta Isabel, Countess of Girgenti
- Isla Cristina – Maria Christina of the Two Sicilies
- Ivanrey (Salamanca) - Fernando Soriano y Gaviria (1859-1928), I Marquis of Ivanrey
- Jaume Roig (Valencia) – Jaume Roig
- Joaquina Eguaras (Granada) - Joaquina Eguaras Ibáñez (1897-1981), first female professor at the University of Granada
- Juan de la Cierva (Getafe) - Juan de la Cierva
- Lanzarote – Lancelotto Malocello (Latin: Lanzarotus Marocelus)
- La Carolina – Charles III of Spain
- La Isabela (Jaén) - Queen Isabella II of Spain
- La Luisiana – Infante Luis of Spain
- Las Navas del Marqués – Marquis Don Pedro de Dávila
- Llanos del Caudillo – Francisco Franco
- Lo Pagán (Murcía) - Pedro Pagán Ayuso (1843-1909), nobleman, politician, and former mayor of Murcía
- Los Ángeles de San Rafael - María de los Ángeles Marín Cobo, wife of Jesús Gil
- Los Cinco de la Riuela (Sevilla) – Manuel Lama Suárez (1886–1936), Francisco Ponce Martín (1898–1936), José Vargas Garrido (1905–1936), José Blanco Osuna (1907–1936) and Antonio González de la Rosa (1905–1936), Five journalists who are assassinated in 1936
- Los Gallardos – Captain Francisco Pedro Gallardo
- Losa del Obispo – Bishop Juan de Rocabertí
- Medellín (Latin: Metellinum) – Quintus Caecilius Metellus Pius (founder)
- Miguel Ángel Blanco (Albacete) – Miguel Ángel Blanco (1968–1997), councilor of the People's Party of Ermua
- Molins de Rei – Alfonso II of Aragon
- Monterrei – Ferdinand IV of Castile
- Morales de Rey – Alfonso VII of León and Castile
- Moscardó (Madrid) – José Moscardó Ituarte, 1st Count of the Alcázar of Toledo, Grandee of Spain
- Mulhacén – Abu l-Hasan Ali, Sultan of Granada
- Negueira de Muñiz - José Antonio Muñiz Álvarez (1883-1956), promoter of the creation of the municipality
- Nava del Rey – Philip II of Spain
- Núcleo General Franco (Málaga) - Francisco Franco
- Obando (Badajoz) - Nicolás de Ovando
- Olías del Rey – Philip V of Spain
- Oliver (Zaragoza) - Manuel Oliver Altavás (d.1938), priest
- Olmeda del Rey – Ferdinand VII of Spain
- Pamplona (Latin: Pompaelo) – Pompey the Great (founder)
- Pedro Lamata (Albacete) – Pedro Lamata (1912–1974), trade unionist, writer and journalist
- Pedro Martínez, Granada – Pedro Martínez, Captain General of Duke of Gor
- Pedro Muñoz – Pedro Muñoz, archdeacon of Alcaraz
- Pío XII (Jerez de la Frontera) – Pope Pius XII
- Pizarro (Cáceres) – Francisco Pizarro
- Poblado de Doña Blanca (Cádiz) - Blanche of Bourbon
- Poblado de Fenosa (Lugo) - Pedro Barrié de la Maza (1888-1971), I count of Fenosa
- Poblado de Gabriel y Galán (Extremadura) – José María Gabriel y Galán
- Prado del Rey – Charles III of Spain
- Puebla de Don Fadrique – Fadrique Álvarez de Toledo, 2nd Duke of Alba
- Puebla del Príncipe – Philip II of Spain
- Puebla de Guzmán - Enrique Pérez de Guzmán y Fonseca, 2nd Duke of Medina Sidonia
- Puerto Banús – Jose Banus (1906–1984), businessman and builder
- Puerto Seguro – Luis Carvajal y Melgarejo, marquis of Puerto Seguro (1871–1937)
- Puerto Serrano – Ginés Serrano de Molina
- Quintanilla de Onésimo – Onésimo Redondo, Castilian lawyer and politician
- Ramales de la Victoria - Baldomero Espartero, Duke of La Victoria
- Rincón del Obispo (Cáceres) – Manuel Llopis Ivorra (1902–1981), bishop of Diocese of Coria-Cáceres from 1950–1977
- San Carlos del Valle - Charles IV of Spain
- San Enrique de Guadiaro (Cádiz) – Enrique Crooke y Larios (1857–1938), president of the Larios agricultural company
- San Fernando de Henares – Ferdinand VI of Spain
- San Fernando – Ferdinand VII of Spain
- San Francisco de Olivenza (Badajoz) – Francisco Franco
- San Fulgencio – Fulgentius of Cartagena, Bishop of Ecija (Astigi)
- San Leonardo de Yagüe – Juan Yagüe, a Spanish army officer
- San Marcelino (Valencia) - Marcelino Olaechea
- San Martín del Rey Aurelio – King Aurelius of Asturias
- San Martín del Tesorillo – Martín Larios y Larios (1839–1889)
- San Pablo de Buceite – Pablo Larios y Sánchez de Piña (1843-1938), businessman, landowner, and aristocrat
- San Rafael de Olivenza (Badajoz) – Rafael Cavestany, Minister of Agriculture
- San Sebastián – Saint Sebastian
- San Sebastián de los Reyes – Ferdinand II of Aragon and Isabella I of Castile, the Catholic Kings
- San Silvestre de Guzmán - Pope Sylvester I and Francisco de Guzmán, Marquis of Ayamonte
- San Vicente de Alcántara – IV Master of the Order of Alcántara, Vicente García Sánchez
- Sant Carles de la Ràpita – Charles III of Spain
- Sant Lluís – Louis XV of France
- Santiago de Alcántara – Saint James the Great
- Santiago de Compostela – Saint James the Great
- Santo Domingo de la Calzada – Dominic de la Calzada (founder)
- Santa Amalia - Maria Josepha Amalia of Saxony
- Santa Bárbara de Casa - Saint Barbara
- Santa Marina del Rey – Ferdinand II of León
- Solvay (Asturias) - Ernest Solvay, Belgian chemist, industrialist, and philanthropist
- Sos del Rey Católico – lit. "You are a Catholic King", Ferdinand II of Aragon
- Talavera de la Reina – Maria of Portugal, Queen of Castile
- Tapia de Casariego - Fernando Fernández de Casariego (1792-1874), I Marquis de Casariego
- Torrejón del Rey – Alfonso VI of León and Castile
- Torrelavega – Garci Lasso de la Vega I (the elder)
- Valdecilla (Cantabria) - Ramón Pelayo de la Torriente (1850-1932), I Marquis of Valdecilla
- Valderrodrigo – Count Rodrigo González Girón
- Valencia de Don Juan – John, Duke of Valencia de Campos
- Valladolid (Arabic: بلد الوليد) – Al-Walid I
- Villa de Don Fadrique – Fadrique Alfonso of Castile
- Villacarlos – Charles III of Spain
- Villacarrillo – Alfonso Carrillo de Acuña
- Villafranco del Guadiana – Francisco Franco
- Villalar de los Comuneros - Juan López de Padilla, Juan Bravo and Francisco Maldonado (rebel), Comuneros rebels during the War of the Communities of Castile
- Villamanrique – Rodrigo Manrique de Lara
- Villamanrique de la Condesa – Princess Marie Isabelle of Orléans
- Villanueva de la Condesa - 14th century Countess Inés Ramírez
- Villanueva de la Reina – Queen Isabella II of Spain
- Villanueva del Arzobispo – Pedro Tenorio, archbishop of Toledo
- Villanueva del Rey – Philip IV of Spain
- Villanueva de Teba - Eugenia María Fitz-James Stuart y Falcó, 20th Countess of Teba (1880-1962) and Carlos Alfonso de Mitjans, 21st Count of Teba
- Villares de la Reina – Berengaria of Castile
- Villarreal – James I of Aragon
- Villarreal de San Carlos – Charles III of Spain
- Villareal de Urrechu – John I of Castile
- Villarrodrigo – Maestre de Santiago Don Rodrigo Manrique (1474–1476)
- Viso del Marqués – Álvaro de Bazán, 2nd Marquis of Santa Cruz
- Vivar del Cid – Rodrigo Díaz de Vivar, El Cid
- Zaragoza (Latin: Caesaraugusta) – Emperor Augustus
- Zurbarán (Badajoz) - Francisco de Zurbarán

Former:

- El Ferrol del Caudillo – Francisco Franco's birthplace (now restored its original name Ferrol)
- Barbate de Franco – one of the many towns where Francisco Franco spent his holidays
- Guadiana del Caudillo – Francisco Franco (now given a new name, Guadiana)
- Villafranco del Guadalhorce – Francisco Franco (now given a new name, Villa del Guadalhorce)

=== Sri Lanka ===
- Ashraff Nagar (Ampara) - M. H. M. Ashraff
- Senanayake-pura (Ampara) - D. S. Senanayake
- Sri Jayawardenepura Kotte - J. R. Jayewardene

=== Sudan ===
- Abu Hamad – Sheikh Abu Hamed
- Al Shaikh Abdulmahmood (Al Jazirah State) - Sheikh Abdulmahmood Nur al-Daim (1845–1915)
- Kosti, Sudan - Konstantinos "Kostas" Mourikis (1867–1937), Greek merchant and founder
- Suakin, formerly named Ptolemais Theron – Ptolemy II Philadelphus

=== Suriname ===
- Albina, Suriname – Albina Josefine Liezenmaier (1815–1904)
- Alfonsdorp - Alfons Karwafodi
- Anapaikë - Chief Anapaikë (d.2002), first paramount chief of the Wayana people
- Apetina - Kananoe Apetina, Wayana chief
- Bakhuys – Louis August Bakhuis (1855–1931)
- Benzdorp – Henry Albert Wilhelm Benz (1889–1962), Dutch consul and bullion dealer
- Bernharddorp – Prince Bernhard of Lippe-Biesterfeld and Saint Bernard of Clairvaux
- Brownsweg – John Brown, 19th century gold miner
- Cabendadorp – Chief Joseph Cabenda (1925–2012)
- Corneliskondre – Chief Cornelis Tapopi
- Donderskamp – Peter Donders
- Julianatop – Queen Juliana of the Netherlands
- Lelydorp – Cornelis Lely, Dutch governor of Suriname
- Marijkedorp - Princess Christina of the Netherlands
- Marshallkreek – Captain Marshall, who explored in Marshall's Creek, Suriname
- Stoelmanseiland – Philip Samuel Stoelman (1744–1800)

=== Sweden ===
- Borstahusen – Rasmus Andersson Borste and Jöns Andersson Borste, fishermen
- Charlottenberg – Charlotta Larsson (1797–1856) (wife of the founder of the industry)
- Dorotea – Frederica Dorothea Wilhelmina of Baden, Swedish queen
- Eskilstuna – Saint Eskil
- Filipstad – Karl Filip, the son of King Charles IX of Sweden
- Flemingsberg – Henrik Klasson Fleming, Lord Marshal, owner, 16th century
- Fredrika – Frederica Dorothea Wilhelmina of Baden, Swedish queen
- Gustavsberg – Gustaf Oxenstierna, father of the owner, 17th century
- Jakobsberg – Jakob Lilliehöök, owner, 17th century
- Karlsborg (Västra Götaland) – King Charles XIV John of Sweden
- Karlsborg, Kalix Municipality – King Charles XV of Sweden
- Karlshamn – King Charles X Gustav of Sweden
- Karlskoga – King Charles IX of Sweden
- Karlskrona – King Charles XI of Sweden
- Karlstad – King Charles IX of Sweden
- Katrineholm – Catharina von der Linde, daughter of the estate owner, 17th century
- Kramfors – Christoffer Kramm (1690–1752)
- Kristianopel – King Christian IV of Denmark
- Kristianstad – King Christian IV of Denmark
- Kristinehamn – Queen Christina of Sweden
- Kungens Kurva – King Gustav V of Sweden
- Kungsängen – King Gustaf VI Adolf of Sweden
- Mariefred – Mary, mother of Jesus
- Mariestad – Queen Mary, wife of Charles IX of Sweden
- Örnsköldsvik – Per Abraham Örnsköld, county governor of Västernorrland County, 1762–1769
- Oskarshamn – King Oscar I of Sweden
- Ulricehamn – Queen Ulrika Eleonora of Sweden
- Vilhelmina – Frederica Dorothea Wilhelmina of Baden, Swedish queen

=== Switzerland ===
- Augst (near the ancient city of Augusta Raurica) – Roman Emperor Augustus
- Kaiseraugst (also near Augusta Raurica) – Augustus
- Saint-Aubin, Fribourg – Albinus of Angers
- Saint-Barthélemy, Switzerland – Bartholomew the Apostle
- Saint-Brais – Brice of Tours
- Saint-Cergue – Cyriacus
- Saint-George – Saint George
- Saint-Gingolph – Gangulphus
- Saint-Imier – Imerius of Immertal
- Saint-Léonard, Switzerland – Leonard of Noblac
- Saint-Livres – Pope Liberius
- Saint-Martin, Fribourg and Saint-Martin, Valais – Martin of Tours
- Saint-Maurice, Switzerland – Saint Maurice
- Saint-Oyens – Eugendus
- Saint-Prex – Saint Protatius, bishop of Lausanne
- Saint-Saphorin – Saint Symphorian
- Saint-Sulpice, Vaud – Sulpicius the Pious
- San Vittore, Switzerland - Victor Maurus
- Sant'Antonio, Bellinzona - Anthony the Great
- Santa Maria in Calanca - Mary, Mother of Jesus
- St. Gallen – Saint Gall
- St. Martin, Graubünden - Martin of Tours
- St. Margrethen – Margaret the Virgin
- St. Moritz – Saint Maurice
- St. Niklaus – Nicholas of Myra
- St. Silvester – Pope Sylvester I
- St. Stephan – Saint Stephen
- St. Ursen – Ursus of Aosta

=== Syria ===
- Abu Kamal – the Kamal Family
- Al-Bitariyah – Salah al-Din al-Bitar
- Al-Hamidiyah – Sultan Abdul Hamid II
- Al-Malikiyah – Adnan al-Malki, Syrian Army officer
- Al-Naseriyah - Gamal Abdel Nasser
- Al-Qadmus – Cadmus, Phoenician prince
- Apamea (Syria) – Apama, wife of Seleucus I Nicator
- Arwad, formerly Antiochia in Pieria – Antiochus I Soter
- Latakia, formerly Laodicea – Laodice of Macedonia, mother of Seleucus I Nicator
- Marj al-Sultan – Sultan Abdul Hamid I
- Mount Simeon District – Simeon Stylites
- Muadamiyat al-Sham – Al-Mu'azzam Isa, Kurdish Sultan from Ayyubid dynasty
- Palmyra (modern) (Tadumr) – named after a daughter of one of Noah's distant descendants, who was buried in a city
- Salaheddine District – Saladin
- Sayyidah Zaynab – Zaynab bint Ali

Former:

- Laodicea ad Libanum was the name of a Hellenistic settlement – a woman named Laodice among the Seleucids
- Seleucia ad Belum was the name of a Hellenistic settlement – a Seleucus of the Seleucid dynasty
- Dahiyat al-Assad was the name of Dahiyat Harasta during Baathist Syria – Hafez al-Assad, President of Syria
- Qura al-Assad was the name of Qura al-Sham during Baathist Syria – Hafez al-Assad

Occupied:

- Trump Heights – Israeli settlement in the occupied Golan Heights

=== Tajikistan ===
- Avicenna District (Dushanbe) – Avicenna, Persian polymath
- Ayni District – Tajik national poet Sadriddin Ayni
- Devashtich District – Divashtich, a medieval Sogdian ruler in Transoxiana
- Dustmurod Aliev (jamoat) – Dustmurod Aliev (1950–1989), Tajik musician and singer
- Dzhami District – 15th century Tajik-Persian poet Abdurahman Jami
- Ferdowsi district (Dushanbe) – Ferdowsi, Persian poet
- Ghafurov – Tajik historian and President of Tajikistan during the Soviet era, Bobojon Ghafurov
- Gojo Berdiboev (Murghob) – Gojo Berdiboev (1940–2001), President of the Murgab region
- Hamadoni District – 14th-century Persian poet Mir Sayyid Ali Hamadani
- Ismoili Somoni – Isma'il ibn Ahmad
- Jabbor Rasulov District – Prime Minister of Tajikistan during the Soviet era, Jabbor Rasulov
- Mirsaid Mirshakar (town or jamoat) – Mirsaid Mirshakar, a Tajik administrator, author, playwright and poet
- Muminsho Abdulvosiev (Rushon) – Muminsho Abdulvosiev (1933–1992), Tajik statesman
- Nazarsho Dodhudoev (Rushan) – Nazarsho Dodhudoev (1915–2000), Tajik statesman
- Nosiri Khusrav District – 11th century Persian-Tajik poet Nosiri Khusrav
- Rahimzoda – Boki Rahimzoda (1910–1980), Tajik Poet
- Rudaki, Tajikistan – Rudaki, a Persian Poet
- Rumi District – Tajik-Persian poet and philosopher Jaloliddin Rumi
- Safar Amirshoev – Safar Amirshoev (1912–1944), World War II hero
- Shah Mansur district (Dushanbe) – King Mansur I
- Shamsiddin Shohin District – Tajik Poet Shamsiddin Shohin
- Spitamen District – Spitamenes, a Sogdian warlord leader of the uprising
- Temurmalik District – Tajik Medieval hero Timur Malik
- Tursunzoda – Tajik national poet Mirzo Tursunzoda
- Tursun Uljaboev – Tursun Uljabayev, Prime Minister of Tajikistan during the soviet era
- Vose' District - Abdulvose (1845-1888), leader of the Baljuvon Uprising in 1885

Former:

- Alexandria Eschate was the name of Khujand in antiquity – Alexander the Great
- Leninabad was the name of Khujand from 1936 through 1991 – Vladimir Lenin
- Stalinabad was the name of Dushanbe from 1929 through 1961 – Joseph Stalin

=== Tanzania ===
- Kawawa, Tanzania - Rashidi Kawawa, Tanzania's second Prime Minister and key independence leader
- Nyerere (Ward of Zanzibar City) – Julius Nyerere, President of Tanzania
- Songea - Nduna Songea Luafu Mbano (1836-1906), one of the Ngoni warriors

=== Thailand ===
- Chaloem Phra Kiat district, Buriram – Named after golden jubilee of King Bhumibol
- Chaloem Phra Kiat district, Nakhon Ratchasima – Named after golden jubilee of King Bhumibol
- Chaloem Phra Kiat district, Nakhon Si Thammarat – Named after golden jubilee of King Bhumibol
- Chaloem Phra Kiat district, Nan – Named after golden jubilee of King Bhumibol
- Chaloem Phra Kiat district, Saraburi – Named after golden jubilee of King Bhumibol
- Chaophraya Surasak – Chaophraya Surasakmontri
- Chulabhorn district, Nakhon Si Thammarat Province – Princess Chulabhorn
- Galyani Vadhana district, Chiang Mai Province – Princess Galyani Vadhana
- Mae Fa Luang district – Princess Mother Srinagarindra (Mae Fa Luang)
- Phaya Mengrai district, Chiang Rai Province – King Mangrai (Mengrai)
- Prachaksinlapakhom district – Prince Prachaksinlapakhom (1856–1924)
- Sirindhorn district, Ubon Ratchathani Province – HRH Princess Sirindhorn
- Srinagarindra district, Phatthalung Province – HRH Princess Srinagarindra
- Phibun Mangsahan district - Plaek Phibunsongkhram (Phibun)
- Ubolratana district, Khon Kaen Province – Princess Ubol Ratana
- Vibhavadi district, Surat Thani Province – Princess Vibhavadi Rangsit
- Wachirabarami district, Phichit Province – Prince Vajiralongkorn (RTGS: Wachiralongkon, now King Vajiralongkorn)
- Watthana district, Bangkok – Princess Galyani Vadhana, alternative transliteration

=== Timor-Leste ===
- Cristo Rei Administrative Post - Jesus
- Dom Aleixo Administrative Post – Aleixo Corte-Real, East Timorese chieftain (liurai or régulo) and anti-Japanese resistance hero

Former:

- Vila Armindo Monteiro was the name of Bobonaro – Armindo Monteiro (1896–1955), Portuguese university professor, businessman, diplomat, and politician
- Vila Eduardo Marques was the name of Bazartete – Eduardo Marques (1867–1944), Portuguese military and officer
- Vila Filomeno da Câmara was the name of Same – Filomeno da Câmara de Melo Cabral (1873–1934), Governor of Portuguese Timor
- Vila General Carmona was the name of Aileu – Óscar Carmona, Portuguese president
- Vila Salazar was the name of Baucau – António de Oliveira Salazar

=== Togo ===
- Agbodrafo - Agbodra, founder and prominent leader
- Atakpamé - Chief Atakpa
- Missahoé - Mária "Misa" Esterházy von Galántha (1859–1926), German colonial commissioner´s former partner

=== Trinidad and Tobago ===
- Charlotteville – Charlotte of Mecklenburg-Strelitz
- Diego Martin – Don Diego Martin (explorer)
- Duncan Village (Penal–Debe) – Phillip Duncan de Montroe II
- Princes Town – Prince Albert Victor, Duke of Clarence and King George V
- Williamsville – Eric Williams

=== Tunisia ===
- Ezzahra - Lazhar Chraïti (1919–1963), a prominent armed resistance leader (fellagha) during the struggle against French rule
- Haffouz - Tahar and Ali Haffouz, two Tunisian nationalist activists assassinated in 1954
- El-Mansuriya – al-Mansur bi-Nasr Allah
- Mahdia, formerly Aphrodisium – Abdullah al-Mahdi Billah
- Menzel Bourguiba – Habib Bourguiba, first President of Tunisia
- Menzel Bouzaiane - Hocine Bouzaiane (1925-1956), constitutionalist leader
- Menzel Farsi - 15th-century Persian saint and scholar Abu al-Qasim al-Isfahani
- Menzel Hached (Mahdia Governorate) - Farhat Hached (1914–1952), influential labor union leader and founder of the UGTT
- Mohamedia, Tunisia - Ahmad I ibn Mustafa

Former:

- Ferryville was the name of Menzel Bourguiba – Jules Ferry
- Massicault was the name of Borj El Amri - Justin Massicault, Resident General of France in Tunisia from 1886 to 1892
- Philippe-Thomas was the name of Métlaoui - Philippe Thomas, French geologist and veterinarian
- Pichon was the name of Haffouz - Stephen Pichon
- Potinville was the name of Borj Cédria, Tunisia - Paul Potin (1847-1923), son of grocer Félix Potin

=== Turkey ===
- Adampol – Adam Jerzy Czartoryski
- Adana, formerly Antiochia in Cilicia and Antiochia ad Sarum – one of the Seleucids named Antiochus
- Adnan Menderes, Keçiören – Adnan Menderes, Prime minister of Turkey
- Ahmet Taner Kışlalı (Ankara) – Ahmet Taner Kışlalı, Turkish intellectual
- Alabanda, formerly Antiochia of the Chrysaorians – Antiochus III
- Antakya, formerly Antiochia – Antiochus, father of Seleucus I Nicator
- Antioch, Pisidia – Antiochus, father of Seleucus
- Antioch on the Maeander – Antiochus I Soter
- Antiochia, Lydia – Antiochus IV
- Antiochia Lamotis – one of the Seleucids named Antiochus
- Antiochia ad Cragum – Antiochus IV
- Antiochia ad Pyramum – one of the Seleucids named Antiochus
- Antiochia ad Taurum – one of the Seleucids named Antiochus
- Antiochia Paraliou – one of the Seleucids named Antiochus
- Antiochia in Mesopotamia also known as Antiochia in Arabia:
  - named for one of the Seleucids named Antiochus
  - later named Antoninopolis – one of the Antonines, probably Antoninus Pius
  - yet later named Constantia and Constantina – Roman emperor Constantius Chlorus
  - yet later named Maximianopolis – Roman emperor Maximian
- Apamea (Euphrates) – Apama, wife of Seleucus I Nicator
- Apamea (Phrygia) – Apama, wife of Seleucus I Nicator
- Apamea Myrlea:
  - named for Apama, wife of King Prusias I of Bithynia
  - later site of Roman colony, Colonia Iulia Concordia – Julius Caesar
- Aydın:
  - named for Mehmed Bey, the founder of the Anatolian beylik of Aydinids in 1307
  - formerly Antiochia – Antiochus, father of Seleucus
  - also formerly Seleucia ad Maeandrum – Seleucus I Nicator
  - also formerly Caesarea and Kaisareia – Julius Caesar
- Aziziye - Abdulaziz
- Balışeyh – Sheikh Edebali
- Battalgazi – Battal Gazi, a Muslim, saintly figure and warrior based in Anatolia
- Bayrampaşa – Bayram Pasha, a 17th-century Ottoman grand vizier
- Beypazarı, Ankara – Osman I
- Burhaniye - Şehzade Mehmed Burhaneddin (son of Abdul Hamid II)
- Cebrene:
  - formerly Alexandria – Alexander the Great
  - formerly Antiochia in Troad – Antiochus I Soter
- Dursunbey - Emir Dursun, Commander during Orhan Gazi´s sultanate
- Edirne, formerly Hadrianopolis – Roman emperor Hadrian
- Emirgazi - Emir Gazi
- Ereğli, formerly Heracleia – Heracles
- Eski Stambul:
  - formerly Colonia Alexandria Augusta Troas – Augustus and Alexander the Great
  - formerly Alexandria Troas – Alexander the Great
  - formerly Antigonia Troas – Antigonus I Monophthalmus
- Evren, Ankara - Kenan Evren, President of Turkey
- Eyüpsultan - Abu Ayyub al-Ansari
- Fahri Korutürk (Mamak) – Fahri Korutürk, President of Turkey
- Fethiye - Captain Fethi Bey (1891-1914), pilot of the Ottoman Air Force who died during an airplane crash
- Fevzipaşa – Fevzi Çakmak
- Gaziosmanpaşa – Gazi Osman Pasha, a prominent Ottoman general who was active in the Balkans
- Gazipaşa - Gazi Mustafa Kemal Atatürk
- Gn.Zeki Doğan (Mamak) – Zeki Doğan (1895–1961), Turkish soldier
- İnönü, Eskişehir – İsmet İnönü, President of Turkey
- İsmetpaşa – İsmet İnönü, President of Turkey
- Iğdır - İğdir Bey, the eldest son of Deniz Han
- Istanbul, formerly Konstantinoupolis/Constantinople – Constantine I
- Kazım Orbay (Mamak) – Kazım Orbay, a Turkish general and senator
- Kazımkarabekir – Kâzım Karabekir, commander
- Karacabey – Turkish soldier during the Ottoman era, Karaca Bey
- Kasımpaşa, Beyoğlu – Güzelce Kasım Paşa
- Kayseri – after the title Caesar – Emperor, specifically Emperor Augustus
- Kemaliye - Mustafa Kemal Atatürk
- Kemalköy, Edirne - Mustafa Kemal Atatürk
- Kemalpaşa and Kemalpaşa, Artvin – Mustafa Kemal Atatürk, President of Turkey
- Kocasinan – Mimar Sinan
- Ladik, formerly Laodicea Pontica – one of the Seleucids named Laodice
- Lalapaşa – Lala Şahin Pasha
- Laodicea on the Lycus – Laodice I, wife of Antiochus II
- Laodicea Combusta – Laodice of Macedonia, mother of Seleucus I Nicator
- Lysimachia – Lysimachus
- Mahmudiye - Mahmud II
- Mehmet Akif Ersoy (Ankara) – Mehmet Akif Ersoy, Turkish poet
- Melikgazi - Gazi Gümüshtigin
- Menderes, İzmir - Adnan Menderes, Prime minister of Turkey
- Merkezefendi – Merkez Efendi, an Ottoman sufi
- Mihalgazi - Köse Mihal
- Mopsuestia:
  - formerly named Seleucia on the Pyramus – Seleucus I Nicator
  - formerly named Hadria – Hadrian
  - formerly named Decia – Roman emperor Decius
- Muhsin Ertuğrul, Cankaya – Muhsin Ertuğrul, Turkish theatre director
- Muradiye - Murad IV
- Muratpaşa – Murat Pasha of Karaman
- Mustafakemalpaşa – Mustafa Kemal Atatürk, First President of Turkey
- Namık Kemal (Ankara) – Namık Kemal, an Ottoman writer and political activist
- Nusaybin, formerly Antiochia Mygdonia – Antiochus I Soter
- Orhangazi - Orhan
- Osmancık, Osmaneli, Osmangazi and Osmaniye - Osman I
- Özal (Malatya) - Turgut Özal
- Peyami Safa (Mamak) – Peyami Safa, Turkish journalist
- Reşadiye - Mehmed V
- Saimbeyli – Saim Bey (1893-1921), Turkish National Movement commander
- Samosata, formerly Antiochia in Commagene – one of the Seleucids named Antiochus
- Şanlıurfa:
  - formerly Antiochia on the Callirhoe – Antiochus IV
  - formerly Justinopolis – Byzantine emperor Justinian
- Şahinbey – Şahin Bey, a Turkish National Movement commander
- Şehit Cengiz Topel (Mamak) – Cengiz Topel, a fighter pilot of the Turkish Air Force
- Şehitkamil - Mehmet Kamil (1906-1920), first martyr of the Antep Defense
- Şehit Kubilay (Keçiören) – Mustafa Fehmi Kubilay
- Seleucia Pieria – Seleucus I Nicator
- Seleucia above Zeugma – Seleucus I Nicator
- Seleucia (Pamphylia) – Seleucus I Nicator
- Seleucia Sidera:
  - named for Seleucus I Nicator
  - later called Claudioseleucia – Roman emperor Claudius
- Zeugma, formerly Seleucia – Seleucus I Nicator¨
- Seyitgazi - Seyyid Battal Gazi
- Silifke, formerly Seleucia – Seleucus I Nicator
- Sinanpaşa – Sinan Paşa, a son of a lord of the Akkoyunlu Turks
- Sinop – Sinope – disputed
- Sokullu Mehmet Paşa (Ankara) – Sokollu Mehmed Pasha
- Stratonicea (Lydia):
  - named for a royal wife named Stratonice, possibly the wife of Eumenes II
  - later named Hadrianopolis – Hadrian
- Stratonicea (Caria):
  - named for Stratonice of Syria
  - later named Hadrianopolis – Hadrian
- Sultanhisar - Nilüfer Sultan, daughter of Aydın Bey
- Süleymanpaşa – Süleyman Pasha (son of Orhan)
- Tarsus, formerly Antiochia on the Cydnus – Antiochus IV
- Tufanbeyli - Osman Tufan Bey (1889-1944), military commander and national hero of the Turkish War of Independence
- Yavuz Sultan Selim (Kahramankazan) and Yavuzeli – Selim I
- Yunusemre - Yunus Emre, folk poet
- Yusufeli - Prince Şehzade Yusuf Izzeddin
- Zübeyde Hanım (Ankara) – Zübeyde Hanım

Former:

- Antioch was the name of an antique city near today's Antakya – Antiochus

=== Turkmenistan ===
- Aba Annaýew – Aba Annaýew, great-uncle of Gurbanguly Berdimuhamedow, the second president of Turkmenistan.
- Agaýusup adyndaky (Mary) – Aga Yusup Alyýew (1882–1970), Hero of Socialist Labor
- Akmyrat Hümmedow adyndaky (Mary) – Akmyrat Hümmedow (1931–2000), Turkmen actor
- Alty Garlyev (Ahal) – Alty Karliev, Turkmen stage and film actor, director and dramatist
- Andalyp (city) – Nurmuhammet Andalyp (1660–1740), Turkmen philosopher
- Annagylyç Ataýew adyndaky (Dashoguz) – Annagylyç Ataýew (1912–1943), Hero of Turkmenistan
- Arkadag – Gurbanguly Berdimuhamedow (Arkadag), former president
- Ashgabat – Arsaces I of Parthia
- Aşyr Kakabaýew adyndaky (Dashoguz) – Aşyr Kakabaýew (1909–1968), Turkmen cotton grower
- Babadaýhan – Bābā-Dihqān, Iranian mythological figure
- Balta Myradow adyndaky (Lebap) – Balta Myradow (1908–1984), Turkmen businessman and politician
- Balyş Öwezow (Görogly) – Balysh Ovezov, Prime Minister of Turkmenistan during the soviet era
- Berdy Kerbabaýew adyndaky and Kerbabayeva – Berdy Kerbabayev, Turkmen writer
- Deňizhan – Deniz han, (also spelled Dengiz khan) Deňiz han in Turkmen, mythical khan of the Oghuz Turks.
- Döwletmämmet Azady adyndaky (Lebap) – Döwletmämmet Azady, Turkmen poet
- Gurban Durdy (Ahal) – Gurban Durdy (1917–1976), Hero of Turkmenistan
- Görogly (city) – Koroghlu, a semi-mystical hero
- Hüdük Myradow adyndak (Dashoguz) – Hüdük Myradow (1921–1987), Hero of Socialist Labor
- J.Atajanov (Mary) – Jumadurdy Atajanow (1913–1969), Hero of Turkmenistan
- Jumanyýaz Hudaýbergenow adyndaky (Dashoguz) – Jumanyýaz Hudaýbergenow (1912–1943), World War II hero
- Kulyýewa adyndaky (Lebap) – Gylyç Kulyýew (1913–1990), Turkmen writer and diplomat
- Magtymguly District – Magtymguly Pyragy, Turkmen poet
- Magtymguly Garlyýew (Akdepe) – Magtymguly Garly (1889–1957), Turkmen musician
- Mollanepes – Turkmen National writer, Mollanepes (1810–1862)
- Nyýazow adyndaky (Mary) – Saparmurat Niyazov
- Nobat Gutlyýew adyndaky (Lebap) – Nobat Gutlyýew (1910–1967), Hero of Socialist Labor
- Oguzhan (town) – Oghuz Khagan, the mythical progenitor of the Turkic nations
- Orazgeldi Ärsaryýew adyndaky (Dashoguz) – Orazgeldi Ärsaryýew (1900–1978), Turkmen hero
- Rejepguly Ataýew adyndaky (Dashoguz) – Rejepguly Ataýew (1920–1972), Hero of Socialist Labor
- Saparmyrat Türkmenbaşy – Saparmurat Niyazov
- Sadylla Rozmetow adyndaky (Dashoguz) – Sadylla Rozmetow (1920–2011), Hero of Turkmenistan
- Seýdi – Seitnazar Seidi (1775–1836), Turkmen patriot and poet
- Shabat, Turkmenistan – Anusha, Khan of Khiva
- Şabende adyndaky (Dashoguz) – Abdylla Şabende (1720–1800), Turkmen writer
- Şükür bagşy adyndaky (Ahal) – Şükür bagşy (1831–1928), Turkmen folk bard
- Tagan Baýramdurdyýew adyndaky (Ahal) – Tagan Baýramdurdyýew (1909–1977), Turkmen hero
- Turkmenbashi – Saparmurat "Turkmenbashi" Niyazov
- Zelili adyndaky (Lebap) – Zelili (1795–1850), Turkmen poet
- Zynhary (village) – Abdirahim Zynhary (1791–1880), Tukrmen poet

Former:

- Alexandria was given the name of Merv – Alexander the Great
- Antiochia in Margiana was given the name of Merv – Antiochus I Soter
- Atamyrat was given the name of Kerki – Atamyrat Niyazov, Father of Saparmurat Niyazov who died during World War II
- Gurbansoltan Eje was given the name of Andalyp (city) – Gurbansoltan Eje, former president Saparmurat Niyazov's mother
- Kalinin was given the name of Boldumsaz – Mikhail Kalinin
- Kirovsk was given the name of Babadaýhan – Sergei Kirov
- Leninsk was given the name of Turkmenabat – Vladimir Lenin
- Nyýazow was given the name of Shabat, Turkmenistan – Saparmurat Niyazov, President of Turkmenistan
- Stalin was given the name of Murgap, Turkmenistan – Joseph Stalin
- Telmansk was given the name of Gubadag – Ernst Thälmann
- Voro'silovabad was given the name of Boldumsaz – Kliment Voroshilov

=== Uganda ===
- Fort Portal – Sir Gerald Portal (British commissioner)
- Murchison Falls – Sir Roderick Impey Murchison, 1st Baronet
- Port Bell – Sir Hesketh Bell (British commissioner)

=== Ukraine ===
- Alchevsk – Oleksiy Alchevsky, Ukrainian entrepreneur, banker, and industrialist
- Apostolove – Danylo Apostol, Hetman of the Zaporozhian Host
- Barvinkove – ataman Ivan Barvinok
- Berdychiv – after a servant of Kyiv boyar Kalenyk Myshkovych (progenitor of Tyszkiewicz family) Berdych
- Boryspil – Boris
- Budaniv – Jakub Bodzanowski, founder
- Chystiakove – a merchant from Taganrog Chistiakov
- Dokuchaievsk – Vasily Dokuchaev, geologist and geographer
- Hlushkove (Zaporizhia) - Valentin Glushko, engineer
- Hoholeve – Nikolai Gogol (Mykola Hohol), writer
- Horlivka – Pyotr Gorlov, mining engineer and geologist
- Ivano-Frankivsk – writer Ivan Franko
- Izmail – Ottoman Grand Vizier (Ayaşlı Ismail Pasha?)
- Kakhovka – Vasiliy Kakhovsky (1738–1794), Governor of the province of Tauris (Taurida Oblast)
- Kharkiv – Cossack Kharyton (Chariton)
- Khmelnytskyi – Bohdan Khmelnytsky, Leader of the Zaporozhian Cossacks
- Khutir-Mykhailivskyi – Mikhail Tereshchenko, businessman
- Klavdiievo-Tarasove – Southwestern Railways Director Klavdiy Nemishaiev and Taras Shevchenko, poet
- Korsun-Shevchenkivskyi – Taras Shevchenko, poet
- Kostiantynivka – Kostiantyn Nomikossov (1812–1907), son of former landowner
- Kotsiubynske – Mykhailo Kotsiubynsky, author
- Krolevets – King (Polish: król) Sigismund III of Poland
- Kropyvnytskyi – Marko Kropyvnytskyi, Ukrainian writer, dramaturge, composer, theatre actor and director
- Kyiv – Kyi
- Liubar – Liubartas
- Lviv – Leo I of Halych
- Makiivka – Cossack Makei
- Malyn – Mal (prince of the Drevlyans) or Malusha
- Mariupol – St. Mary or Empress consort of Russia Maria Fyodorovna
- Mykhailo-Kotsiubynske – writer Mykhailo Kotsiubynsky
- Mohyliv-Podilskyi – Ieremia Movilă
- Mykolaiv – Saint Nicholas
- Myronivka – Myron Zelenyi, cossack or free settler
- Nemishaieve – Klavdiy Nemishaiev (1847-1927), Southwestern Railways director
- Novovorontsovka – Mikhail Semyonovich Vorontsov, field marshal
- Olevsk – Oleg of Drelinia
- Ovidiopol – Ovid
- Pavlohrad – Paul I of Russia
- Pyrohove – a neighborhood of Vinnytsia, former village named after Nikolay Pirogov
- Radyvyliv – Mikołaj "the Black" Radziwiłł
- Romaniv – Roman the Great
- Sadhora – Piotr Mikołaj Gartenberg Sadogórski, founder
- Sheptytskyi – Father Andrey Sheptytsky, Metropolitan of Galicia and Archbishop of Lemberg (Lviv)
- Shevchenkove – Taras Shevchenko
- Siedove – Georgy Sedov, artic explorer
- Skadovsk – hydrobiologist and biochemist Sergey B. Skadovsky (1863-1918)
- Smila – unnamed local heroine
- Smoline – Mykola Smolin (1928–1974), Ukrainian geologist
- Starokostiantyniv – Konstanty Wasyl Ostrogski
- Sukhomlynove (Odessa) - Vasyl Sukhomlynsky, teacher
- Susval – Petro Ostapovych Susval (1990–2014), soldier of the Ukrainian Armed Forces
- Synelnykove – Ivan Sinelnikov (uk, ru)
- Tairove – Armenian and Soviet scientist Vasily Tairov (1859–1938)
- Teofipol – Teofilia Strzyżsława Jabłonowska
- Terezyne – Teresa Radziwiłł (1889-1975)
- Ternopil – Jan Tarnowski (and Tarnowski family)
- Tomashpil – Tomasz Zamoyski
- Tytarenkove – Serhiy Tytarenko (1992–2014), a fallen soldier of the Ukrainian Armed Forces
- Vakulenchuk – Grigory Vakulenchuk, one of the leaders of the uprising on the battleship “Potemkin”
- Vasylivka – Vasili Stepanovich Popov, general, statesman, and administrator
- Vasylkiv – Basil of Caesarea
- Verkhivtseve – Alexander Verkhovtsev (1837-1900), railway engineer, head of the Kateryninska Railway company
- Volodymyr – Vladimir the Great
- Yakymivka – Yakym Kolosov, regional police ispravnic
- Yavornytske – Dmytro Yavornytsky, ethnographer, historian and lexicographer
- Yenakiieve – Fyodor Yenakiyev (1852-1915), engineer and director of the Baltic Railway Company
- Zalizniak (Sumy) – Maksym Zalizniak, legendary Zaporozhian Cossack and leader of the Koliivshchyna rebellion
- Zhovkva – Stanisław Żółkiewski, Polish nobleman

Former:

- Aleksandrovsk, Oleksandrivsk was the name of Zaporizhzhia – Emperor Alexander I
- Artemivsk was the name of Bakhmut – revolutionary Artem
- Dniprodzerzhynsk was the name of Kamianske – Felix Dzerzhinsky
- Dnipropetrovsk was the name of Dnipro – Bolshevik Grigory Petrovsky who was one of the leaders of Communist Ukraine in the 1920s–30s
- Illichivsk was the name of Chornomorsk – Vladimir Illich Lenin
- Katerynopil was the name of Kalynopil – Catherine the Great
- Kirovohrad was the name of Kropyvnytskyi – Sergey Kirov
- Kryndachivka was the name of Khrustalnyi – local landowner Kryndacha
- Krystynopol was the name of Sheptytskyi – Krystyna Lubomirska, wife of Feliks Kazimierz Potocki
- Mykytyn Rih was the name of Nikopol – Cossack Mykyta Tsyhan (as Cygan)
- Nogaisk, Nohaisk was the name of Berdiansk – Nogai Khan
- Novooleksandrivka was the name of Melitopol – after Alexander I of Russia
- Oleksiivka was the name of Chystiakove – after a son of Russian general Leonov
- Osypenko was the name of Berdiansk – Polina Osipenko (originally Osypenko)
- Pereiaslav-Khmelnytskyi was the name of Pereiaslav – Bohdan Khmelnytsky
- Sergo, Serho was the name of Kadiivka – Sergo Ordzhonikidze
- Stakhanov was the name of Kadiivka – famous miner Aleksei Stakhanov
- Stalino was the name of Donetsk – Joseph Stalin
- Stanisławów, Stanyslaviv was the name of Ivano-Frankivsk – Polish magnate Stanisław Potocki
- Sverdlovsk was the name of Dovzhansk – Yakov Sverdlov
- Torez was the name of Chystiakove – Maurice Thorez, French communist leader
- Usivka was the name of Oleksandriia – Cossack Usyk
- Vatutine was the name of Bahacheve – Nikolai Vatutin
- Voroshilovgrad, Voroshylovhrad was the name of Luhansk – Kliment Voroshilov
- Yekaterinin Shanets was the name of Olviopol within Pervomaisk – Catherine the Great
- Yekaterinoslav was the name of Dnipro – Catherine the Great
- Yelizavetgrad, Yelyzavethrad was the name of Kropyvnytskyi – Saint Elizabeth and Empress regnant Elizabeth of Russia
- Yuzivka was the name of Donetsk – British businessman John Hughes
- Zhdanov was the name of Mariupol – Andrey Zhdanov
- Zinovievsk was the name of Kropyvnytskyi – Grigory Zinoviev

=== United Arab Emirates ===
- Khalifa City – Khalifa bin Zayed Al Nahyan, President of the United Arab Emirates
- Madinat Zayed and Zayed City – Zayed bin Sultan Al Nahyan
- Port Rashid – Rashid bin Saeed Al Maktoum, ruler of Dubai

=== United Kingdom ===
==== England ====
- Albert Village – Prince Albert of Saxe-Coburg and Gotha
- Bognor Regis – George V of United Kingdom
- Bury St Edmunds – Edmund the Martyr, King of East Anglia
- Camden Town – Charles Pratt, 1st Earl Camden, Lord Chancellor of King George III
- Campbell Park – Lord Campbell of Eskan, British businessman and social reformer
- Canning Town – Charles Canning, 1st Earl Canning, Postmaster General
- Carterton, Oxfordshire - William Carter (1852–1921), founder and director of Homesteads Ltd.
- Charlestown, Cornwall - Charles Rashleigh (died 1823), entrepreneur
- Charlestown, Derbyshire - Charles Croft, an 18th-century farmer and landowner
- Cubitt Town – William Cubitt (politician), Lord Mayor of London
- Denmark Hill – Prince George of Denmark
- Earlestown - Hardman Earle, director of the London and North Western Railway Company
- Eden Park, London – William Eden, 1st Baron Auckland, President of the Board of Trade
- Edwinstowe - Edwin of Northumbria
- Ellistown - Colonel Joseph Joel Ellis (1834-1885), businessman and landowner
- Emerson Park – Emerson Balston Carter (1878–1963), British landowner and property developer
- Fitzrovia – Charles FitzRoy, 1st Baron Southampton, British Army officer
- Fitzwilliam, West Yorkshire - the Fitzwilliam family (such as: William Wentworth-Fitzwilliam, 6th Earl Fitzwilliam, William Wentworth-Fitzwilliam, 7th Earl Fitzwilliam and Peter Wentworth-Fitzwilliam, 8th Earl Fitzwilliam)
- Fletchertown - William Fletcher (1831-1900), director of the Cockermouth, Keswick, and Penrith Railway company
- Gerrards Cross – Gerard of Chalfont, early landowner
- Guy's Cliffe - Guy of Warwick
- Halsetown – James Halse, English lawyer and wealthy businessman
- Harold Wood – Harold Godwinson, King of the English
- Jealott's Hill - Roger Jolyl, 14th-century landowner
- King's Cross, London – George IV of United Kingdom
- King's Lynn – Henry VIII of England
- Kingstanding – Charles I of England
- Kingston upon Hull – Edward I of England
- Kingston upon Thames – King Æthelstan
- Kington, Herefordshire – Henry I of England
- Knutsford – King Canute
- Lowtherville - Captain Francis Lowther (1841-1908), landowner
- Maryland, London – Henrietta Maria of France
- Nicholstown – Jonas Nichols (1836–1891), English furniture maker, house builder
- Pennsylvania, Exeter - William Penn (Royal Navy officer)
- Pentonville – Henry Penton
- Perkinsville, County Durham – Edward Mosely Perkins (1821–1871), British industrial partner and his son Charles Perkins (1851–1905), colliery owner
- Peterborough – St Peter
- Peterlee – Peter Lee, British trade unionist, and President of the Miners' Federation of Great Britain
- Pope's Hill - Mary Pope, an 18th-century resident of Flaxley Abbey
- Port Clarence – William IV, Duke of Clarence
- Princes Risborough – Edward the Black Prince
- Queen Adelaide, Cambridgeshire – Adelaide of Saxe-Meiningen
- Queen Camel – Eleanor of Provence
- Queen Charlton – Catherine Parr
- Queen's Park, London – Queen Victoria
- Queenborough – Philippa of Hainault
- Russell Hill, Croydon – John Russell, 1st Earl Russell, Prime Minister
- Saltaire – Sir Titus Salt, British industrialist, politician, and philanthropist
- Silvertown – Stephen William Silver, English merchant, outfitter, and avid book collector
- Somers Town, London – Charles Cocks, 1st Baron Somers
- Stewartby - Halley Stewart, Percy Malcolm Stewart and Harold Charles Stewart
- St Albans – St Alban
- St Ives, Cambridgeshire – Saint Ivo
- St Neot, Cornwall – St Neot
- St Neots, Cambridgeshire – St Neot
- Telford – Thomas Telford, civil engineer
- Verney Junction - Sir Harry Verney, 2nd Baronet, President of the Buckinghamshire Railway Company
- Victoria, Cornwall – Queen Victoria
- Victoria, London – Queen Victoria
- Victoria North, Manchester - Queen Victoria
- Whiteley Village - William Whiteley
- Wolverhampton – Wulfrun

==== Northern Ireland ====
- Bessbrook - Elizabeth "Bess" Nicholson, wife of Joseph Nicholson
- Cookstown – Dr. Alan Cooke (politician)
- County Tyrone – Eógan mac Néill, son of Niall of the Nine Hostages
- Craigavon – Lord Craigavon, former Prime Minister
- Downpatrick – St Patrick
- Eglinton, County Londonderry - Archibald Montgomerie, 13th Earl of Eglinton
- Helen's Bay – Lady Helen Dufferin
- Irvinestown - the Irvine family
- Jonesborough, County Armagh - Roth Jones, a Dublin barrister
- Maguiresbridge - Hugh Maguire (Lord of Fermanagh)
- Randalstown – Randal MacDonnell
- Stewartstown, County Tyrone - Andrew Steuart (or Stewart), Lord Ochiltree
- Victoria Bridge, County Tyrone – Queen Victoria

==== Scotland ====
- Alexandria, West Dunbartonshire – Alexander Smollett of Bonhill (died in 1799)
- Charlestown, Fife - Charles Bruce, 5th Earl of Elgin
- Colinsburgh - Colin Lindsay, 3rd Earl of Balcarres
- Dolphinton - Dolfin of Carlisle
- Douglastown - Mr. Douglas, a local landowner
- Evanton - Evan Baillie Fraser
- Fort Augustus – Prince William Augustus, Duke of Cumberland
- Fort William, Scotland – William of Orange
  - renamed several times before being named Fort William again, this time for Prince William, Duke of Cumberland
- Gardynebourg - the Gardyne family
- Helensburgh – Lady Helen Sutherland (1717–1791)
- Jamestown, Fife - James Reid
- Kingsford, East Ayrshire - James V
- Kirkcudbright – St Cuthbert
- Port Logan - Colonel Andrew MacDowall (Douall), the laird of Logan
- Port William, Dumfries and Galloway - Sir William Maxwell, 5th Baronet (1779–1838)
- Quarrier's Village - William Quarrier
- St Andrews – St Andrew
- Stanley, Perthshire - Amelia Stanley (1633–1703), daughter of James Stanley, 7th Earl of Derby
- Upper Victoria - Queen Victoria

==== Wales ====
- Barnardtown - Edward Barnard, a religious investor
- Bute Town - John Crichton-Stuart, 2nd Marquess of Bute
- Earlswood, Monmouthshire - Miles of Gloucester, 1st Earl of Hereford
- Elliotstown, Caerphilly - Sir. George Elliot (1815-1893), co-founder of the Powell Duffryn Steam Coal Company
- Georgetown, Blaenau Gwent - George III of United Kingdom
- Hopkinstown - Evan Hopkin, owner of the 51-acre Tŷ Mawr Estate
- Johnstown, Wrexham - John Bury, member of Wrexham's first Town Council
- Lewistown, Bridgend - William Lewis, 1st Baron Merthyr
- Markham, Caerphilly - Sir Arthur Markham (1866–1916), a prominent industrialist and director of the Tredegar Iron and Steel Company
- Montgomery, Powys – Roger de Montgomerie, Main Counsellor
- Nelson, Caerphilly - Horatio Nelson, 1st Viscount Nelson
- Port Talbot - Christopher Rice Mansel Talbot
- Reynoldston - Reginald de Braose, 12th-century Norman lord
- St Davids – St David
- Stanleytown, Rhondda Cynon Taf - Henry Morton Stanley
- Thomastown, Rhondda Cynon Taf - William Meyler Thomas (1850-1917)
- Trealaw - David Williams (coal owner) "Alaw,"
- Tremadog - William Madocks
- Trethomas - Sir William James Thomas, 1st Baronet, co-owner of the Bedwas Navigation Colliery Company
- Tylorstown - Alfred Tylor
- Victoria, Newport – Queen Victoria
- Wattsville - Edmund Hannay Watts (1830-1902), founder of the London and South Wales Coal Company
- Williamstown, Rhondda Cynon Taf - Caroline Elizabeth Williams, Arthur John Williams and Morgan Bransby Williams (1825-1914), director of the Rhondda and Swansea Bay Railway Company

==== British Overseas Territories ====
- Bermuda – Juan de Bermúdez
- Ducie Island – Baron Ducie
- Falkland Islands – Anthony Cary, 5th Viscount Falkland
- Gibraltar – Tariq ibn Ziyad (from Arabic: جبل طارق, romanized: Jabal Tariq, lit. 'Mountain of Tariq')
- Pitcairn Islands – Robert Pitcairn
- Saint Helena, Ascension and Tristan da Cunha – Helena of Constantinople, and Tristão da Cunha
- South Georgia and the South Sandwich Islands – George III and John Montagu, 4th Earl of Sandwich, respectively.

==== Falkland Islands ====
- Darwin – Charles Darwin
- Stanley – Edward Smith-Stanley, 14th Earl of Derby
- Weddell Island – James Weddell
- Keppel Island – Augustus Keppel, 1st Viscount Keppel
- Saunders Island – Charles Saunders (Royal Navy officer)

==== Saint Helena, Ascension and Tristan da Cunha ====
- Edinburgh of the Seven Seas – The Prince Alfred, Duke of Edinburgh
- Jamestown – James, Duke of York
- Georgetown – George III

==== South Georgia and the South Sandwich Islands ====
- King Edward Point – Edward VII
- Prince Olav Harbour – Crown Prince Olav of Norway

=== United States ===
- Albuquerque, New Mexico – Francisco Fernández de la Cueva, 8th Duke of Alburquerque
- Annapolis, Maryland – Anne, Queen of Great Britain
- Ann Arbor, Michigan – Ann Allen and Mary Ann Rumsey, founders
- Augusta, Georgia – Princess Augusta of Saxe-Gotha
- Austin, Texas – Stephen F. Austin
- Baltimore – Lord Baltimore
- Berkeley, California – George Berkeley, philosopher
- Bismarck, North Dakota – Otto von Bismarck
- Charlotte, North Carolina – Charlotte of Mecklenburg-Strelitz
- Cincinnati – Lucius Quinctius Cincinnatus
- Dallas – George M. Dallas
- Denver – James W. Denver
- Edison, New Jersey – Thomas A. Edison
- Fayetteville, Tennessee – Gilbert du Motier, Marquis de Lafayette
- Fort Myers, Florida – Col. Abraham C. Myers
- Hamilton, Ohio – Alexander Hamilton
- Henderson, Nevada – Charles Henderson (Nevada politician)
- Hershey, Pennsylvania – Milton Hershey, famous chocolatier
- Houston – Sam Houston
- Jacksonville, Florida – Andrew Jackson
- Jim Thorpe, Pennsylvania – Jim Thorpe
- Keokuk, Iowa – Keokuk (Sauk leader)
- King County, Washington – Originally after William R. King, changed to Martin Luther King Jr.
- Lincoln, Nebraska – Abraham Lincoln, President of the United States
- Los Angeles – Our Lady the Queen of the Angels
- Madison, Wisconsin – James Madison
- Nashville, Tennessee – American Revolutionary War hero Francis Nash
- New York City – James of York and Albany
- Pittsburgh – William Pitt the Elder
- Raleigh, North Carolina – Sir Walter Raleigh
- San Antonio – Saint Anthony of Padua
- San Diego – Didacus of Alcalá, better known as San Diego
- San Francisco – Saint Francis
- San Jose, California – Saint Joseph
- Saint Paul, Minnesota – Saint Paul
- St. Augustine, Florida – Augustine of Hippo
- St. Louis, Missouri – Louis IX of France
- Santa Ana, California – Saint Anne
- Santa Barbara, California – Saint Barbara
- Seattle – Chief Seattle
- Ventura, California – Saint Bonaventure
- Washington, D.C. – George Washington
- Ypsilanti, Michigan – Demetrios Ypsilantis

==== Puerto Rico ====
- Amalia Marin (Ponce) – Amalia Marín Castilla (1876–1957)
- Baldorioty De Castro (Ponce) – Román Baldorioty de Castro
- Betances (Cabo Rojo) – Ramón Emeterio Betances, Puerto Rican lawyer
- Bolívar (Santurce) – Simón Bolívar
- Caguas, Puerto Rico – chief Caguax
- Carolina, Puerto Rico – King Charles II of Spain
- Cataño, Puerto Rico – Hernando de Cataño
- Eleanor Roosevelt (Hato Rey) – Eleanor Roosevelt, American Politician
- Fajardo, Puerto Rico – Juan Antonio Fajardo (founder)
- Fernando L.Garcia (Utuado) – Fernando Luis García
- Gobernador Piñero, San Juan, Puerto Rico – Jesús T. Piñero, Governor of Puerto Rico
- Isabela, Puerto Rico – Queen Isabella I of Castile
- Isabel Segunda, Puerto Rico – Isabella II of Spain
- Jaime L. Drew (Ponce) – Jaime L. Drew, Puerto Rican educator
- John F. Kennedy (Mayagüez) – John F. Kennedy
- Juana Díaz, Puerto Rico – Doña Juana Díaz
- Lares, Puerto Rico – Don Amador de Lariz, Spanish nobleman
- Levittown, Puerto Rico – William Levitt
- López Sicardó (Oriente) – Rafael Lopez Sicardo (1875–1937)
- Luis Llorens Torres (Santurce) – Luis Lloréns Torres
- Manuel A. Pérez (San Juan) – Manuel Pérez (teacher)
- Marín (Patillas) and Luis Muñoz Marín (San Lorenzo) – Luis Muñoz Marín, 1st Governor of the Commonwealth of Puerto Rico
- Morel Campos (Ponce) – Juan Morel Campos
- Muñoz Rivera (Patillas) – Luis Muñoz Rivera, Puerto Rican poet, journalist and politician
- Nemesio Canales (San Juan) – Nemesio Canales
- Ponce, Puerto Rico – Juan Ponce de León or Juan Ponce de León y Loayza, great-grandson of Spanish
- Rafael Hernández (Aguadilla) – Rafael Hernández Marín
- Roosevelt Roads (Ceiba) – Franklin D. Roosevelt
- Santurce, San Juan, Puerto Rico – Pablo Ubarri y Capetillo, 1st Count of San José de Santurce (1824–1894)
- San Germán, Puerto Rico – Germaine of Foix, the new queen of King Fernando or Saint Germanus of Auxerre
- Ubarri (Pueblo) – Angel Manuel García Ubarri (1886–1972)
- Villa Georgetti (Barceloneta) – Eduardo Georgetti

=== Uruguay ===
- Alejandro Gallinal - Dr. Alejandro Gallinal (1872-1943)
- Andresito – Andrés Guazurary
- Ansina - Joaquín Lenzina
- Artigas – José Artigas
- Baltasar Brum (Artigas Department) – Baltasar Brum, President of Uruguay
- Bernabé Rivera (Artigas Department) – General Bernabe Rivera (1795-1832)
- Bolívar, Uruguay - Simon Bolivar
- Brigadier General Diego Lamas (Artigas Department) - Diego Eugenio Lamas (1810–1868)
- Florencio Sánchez (Colonia Department) – Florencio Sánchez
- Flores Department – Venancio Flores
- Carlos Reyles, Uruguay - Carlos Reyles, ensayist
- Colonia Rossell y Rius - Alejo Rossell Rius (1848-1919)
- Gallinal - Alberto Gallinal Heber (1909-1994), former intendent of Florida
- General Líber Seregni – Líber Seregni, Uruguayan military and politician
- Getulio Vargas (Uruguay) - Getulio Vargas
- Gregorio Aznárez - Gregorio Aznárez (1860-1951)
- Ismael Cortinas (Flores Department) – Ismael Cortinas
- Javier de Viana (Artigas Department) – Javier de Viana
- Joaquín Suárez (Canelones Department) – Joaquín Suárez
- José Batlle y Ordóñez (Lavalleja Department) – José Batlle y Ordóñez, President of Uruguay
- Juan Jackson - Juan D. Jackson
- Juan Lacaze (Colonia Department) – Juan Luis Lacaze, businessman
- Lavalleja Department – Juan Antonio Lavalleja
- Mones Quintela - Alfredo Mones Quintela (1910-1969), an agricultural engineer
- Ombúes de Lavalle (Colonia Department) – Juan Lavalle
- Piriápolis - Francisco Piria
- Rivera – Fructuoso Rivera
- San Antonio (Canelones Department) – Saint Anthony of Padua
- San Bautista (Canelones Department) – Saint John the Baptist
- San Gregorio de Polanco - José Gregorio Suárez
- San Jacinto (Canelones Department) – Saint Hyacinth of Cracow (in honor of bishop Jacinto Vera)
- San José Department – Saint Joseph
- San Luis (Canelones Department) – Saint Louis IX
- San Ramón (Canelones Department) – Saint Raymond Nonnatus
- Santa Lucía (Canelones Department) – Saint Lucy
- Santa Rosa (Canelones Department) – Saint Rose of Lima
- Santiago Vázquez (Montevideo Department) – Santiago Vázquez (1787-1847)
- Soca (Canelones Department) – Francisco Soca (1856-1922)
- Solís - Juan Díaz de Solís
- Tomás Gomensoro (Artigas Department) – Tomás Gomensoro Albín, President of Uruguay
- Treinta y Tres – Thirty-Three Orientals, Uruguayan revolutionary group
- Zagarzazú - Isidro Zagarzazú (1921-1974), founder

=== Uzbekistan ===
- Abdurahmonov nomidag (Tashkent) – Abdujabbor Abdurahmonov (1907–1975), President of Uzbekistan from 1938 to 1950
- Ahmad Yassaviy (Tashkent) – Ahmad Yasawi
- Ahmad Yugnakiy (Tashkent) – Edib Ahmed bin Mahmud Yüknekî (poet)
- Ajiniyaz (Karakalpakstan) – Ájiniyaz, Karakalpak poet
- Antiochia in Scythia – Antiochus I Soter
- Berdaq (Karakalpakstan) – Berdakh, Karakalpak poet
- Beruniy – al-Biruni
- Dosnazarov (Karakalpakstan) – Allayar Dosnazarov (1896–1937), Karakalpak politician
- F. Yuldashev (Bulungur) – Faizulla Yuldashev (1912–1991), veteran of the Great Patriotic War
- Furqat District - Furqat, author, poet, and political activist
- Gagarin, Uzbekistan – Yuri Gagarin
- Gani Azamov, Qoraqamish – Gani Azamov (1909–2001), Uzbek actor
- H.Tursunqulov (Tashkent) – Hamrakul Tursunkulov (1892–1965), chairman of the collective farm
- Hamid Olimjon (Sirdaryo) - Hamid Olimjon, poet
- Ibrat - Ishaqxon Ibrat (1862–1937), Uzbek intellectual, linguist, publisher in the Jadid reform movement
- Iskandar (town) – Grand Duke Nicholas Konstantinovich of Russia
- Islom Shoir (Samarkand) – Islom Shoir (1874–1953), Uzbek poet
- Kasri Orifon (Bukhara) - Baha-ud-Din Naqshband (1318–1389), 14th century Sufi saint of Bukhara
- Khamzy (Tashkent) and Khamzy (Uchqorgon) – Hamza Hakimzade Niyazi, poet
- M. Jalolov (Andijan) - Mannop Jalolov (1924-1982), Uzbek economic and political figure
- Mirzo Ulugbek, Ulugbek (town) – Ulugh Beg, astronomer, mathematician and sultan
- Muborak – Islamic scholar Abdullah bin al-Mubarak al-Marwazi
- Muqimiy - Muhammad Aminkhoja Muqimi (1850–1903), democratic poet and satirist
- Navoiy – Uzbek poet Alisher Navoi
- Sharof Rashidov District (Jizzakh) – Sharof Rashidov, President of Uzbekistan from 1950 to 1959
- Oxunboboyev (Shurchi) – Yuldash Akhunbabaev
- S. Umarov (Navoiy) – Salih Khusanovich Umarov (1922–1995), World War II hero
- Shaykhontohur – Sheikh Khovendi at-Takhu, a famous thinker and educator
- Sobir Kamolov (Karakalpakstan) – Sobir Kamolov, Prime Minister of Uzbekistan from 1955 to 1957
- Sobir Rahimov nomli (Bostanlyk) – Sobir Rakhimov
- T.Ahmedov nomidag (Sirdaryo) – Turgun Ahmedov (1925–1944), World War II hero
- Toʻraqoʻrgʻon - Hakimxon Toʻra (1802-1843), 19th century historian, enlightener, and royal descendant
- U.Musaev (Yangiyul) – Ubaydulla Musaev (1914–1972), Uzbek political figure
- Zakirov (Tashkent) – Qodir Zokirov, Uzbek scientist, botanist and educator
- Zangiota District - 13th-century Sufi saint Sheikh Ali Khwaja (Zangi Ota)

Former:

- "Akhunbabaev" was the name of Jalaquduq – Soviet Uzbek state figure Yuldash Akhunbabaev (1885–1943)
- "Akmal-Ikramov" was the name of Uchtepa – Akmal Ikramov
- "Kuybishevo" was the name of Rishtan – Valerian Kuybyshev
- "Leninsk" was the name of Asaka, Uzbekistan – Vladimir Lenin
- "Skobelev" was the name of Fergana – Mikhail Skobelev
- "Sobir Rakhimov" was the name of Olmazar – Sobir Rakhimov
- "Hamza" was the name of Yashnobod – Hamza Hakimzade Niyazi

=== Venezuela ===
==== Amazonas ====
- Fernando Girón Tovar (Amazonas) - Fernando Girón Tovar (1936-1993), National deputy of Amazonas
- Luis Alberto Gómez (Amazonas) - Luis Alberto Gómez, notable regional politician and civic organizer who helped lobby for Amazonas to transition from a "Federal Territory" into a full Venezuelan state in 1992
- Maroa, Amazonas – Cacique Maruwa, founder
- San Fernando de Atabapo - Ferdinand III of Castile
- San Juan de Manapiare - John the Baptist
- San Carlos de Río Negro - Charles III of Spain
- Solano (Amazonas) - José Solano y Bote, Spanish Navy officer and colonial administrator

==== Anzoátegui ====
- Diego Bautista Urbaneja Municipality – Diego Bautista Urbaneja
- Edmundo Barrios (Anzoátegui) - Edmundo Barrios (d.1992), journalist and founder of the weekly newspaper Antorcha
- Fernando de Peñalver Municipality - Fernando Peñalver, statesman, co-signer of the Venezuelan Declaration of Independence, and the first governor of Carabobo
- Francisco del Carmen Carvajal Municipality - General Francisco del Carmen Carvajal, a brave patriot officer during the War of Independence
- Francisco de Miranda, Anzoátegui – Francisco de Miranda, Venezuelan Independence hero
- José Gregorio Monagas Municipality - José Tadeo Monagas
- Juan Antonio Sotillo Municipality - Juan Antonio Sotillo, military leader during the War of Independence and the Federal War
- Juan Manuel Cajigal Municipality - Juan Manuel Cajigal y Odoardo, Venezuelan mathematician, engineer, and astronomer
- Manuel Ezequiel Bruzual Municipality - Manuel Ezequiel Bruzual, military officer who briefly served as provisional President of Venezuela
- Miguel Otero Silva (Anzoátegui) - Miguel Otero Silva, writer, journalist, humorist and politician
- Pedro María Freites Municipality - General Pedro María Freites (1790–1817), a war hero who defended the Casa Fuerte of Barcelona against royalists
- San Juan de Capistrano Municipality - John of Capistrano
- Simón Bolívar Municipality, Anzoátegui - Simón Bolívar
- Simón Rodríguez Municipality - Simón Rodríguez, progressive philosopher, educator, and childhood tutor of Simón Bolívar
- Sir Arthur McGregor Municipality - Gregor MacGregor, Scottish general who joined the British Legions to fight for Bolívar
- Tomás Alfaro Calatrava (Anzoátegui) - Tomás Alfaro Calatrava (1922–1963), Venezuelan poet, writer, and lawyer

==== Apure ====
- Biruaca - Chieftain Birruaka, indigenous warrior
- Elorza - Colonel José Andrés Elorza, Venezuelan independence hero
- Muñoz Municipality - General José Cornelio Muñoz (1794–1852), a prominent Venezuelan military officer
- Páez, Apure – José Antonio Páez, Independence hero
- Pedro Camejo Municipality - Lieutenant Pedro Camejo, Afro-Venezuelan independence hero
- Rómulo Gallegos Municipality, Apure – Rómulo Gallegos, Venezuela's most celebrated novelists and its first democratically elected president
- San Fernando de Apure - Ferdinand VII of Spain

==== Aragua ====
- Alfredo Pacheco Miranda Parish - Alfredo Pacheco Miranda (1888-1940), writer, orator and journalist
- Arévalo Aponte Parish - Colonel Pedro Arévalo Aponte (1766–1816): Afro-Venezuelan officer
- Augusto Mijares Parish - Augusto Mijares, Venezuelan lawyer, historian, writer, educator, and journalist
- Bolívar Municipality, Aragua and Libertador Municipality, Aragua - Simón Bolívar
- Castor Nieves Ríos (Aragua) - Castor Nieves Ríos (1908-1952), prominent resistance fighter against the dictatorship of General Marcos Pérez Jiménez
- Colonia Tovar - Manuel Felipe de Tovar, landowner who donated the mountain estates to establish the colony of German immigrants in 1843.
- Francisco Linares Alcántara Municipality – Francisco Linares Alcántara, Venezuelan President
- Girardot Municipality, Aragua - Atanasio Girardot, Colombian-born revolutionary hero
- José Angel Lamas Municipality - José Ángel Lamas, Venezuelan classical musician and composer
- José Casanova Godoy (Aragua) - José Casanova Godoy (1943-1983), educator, cultural promoter, social manager and Governor of Aragua
- José Félix Ribas Municipality, Aragua - General José Félix Ribas, Hero of the decisive Battle of La Victoria
- José Rafael Revenga Municipality - José Rafael Revenga, diplomat who served as secretary to Simón Bolívar and Minister of Foreign Affairs
- Madre María de San José (Aragua) - Laura Evangelista Alvarado Cardozo, also known as Mother Mary of Saint Joseph
- Mario Briceño Iragorry Municipality – Mario Briceño Iragorry, Venezuelan writer, cultural diplomat, and historian
- Monseñor Feliciano González Parish - Monseñor Feliciano González (1921-1986), Second Bishop of Maracay
- San Casimiro - Saint Casimir
- Santiago Mariño Municipality - Santiago Mariño, Venezuelan independence hero
- Santos Michelena Municipality - Santos Michelena, 19th-century diplomat and statesman who was crucial in organizing Venezuela's early public treasury
- Sucre Municipality, Aragua - Antonio José de Sucre

==== Barinas ====
- Alberto Arvelo Torrealba Municipality – Alberto Arvelo Torrealba, a famous Barinas-born lawyer, diplomat, and poet celebrated for writing the legendary Venezuelan llanero epic poem Florentino y el diablo
- Alfredo Arvelo Larriva Parish - Alfredo Arvelo Larriva (1883-1934), poet, journalist, and politician
- Andrés Eloy Blanco Municipality, Barinas – Andrés Eloy Blanco, Venezuelan poet, politician, and intellectual widely known as the "Poet of the People"
- Antonio José de Sucre Municipality - Antonio José de Sucre
- Arismendi Municipality, Barinas - General Juan Bautista Arismendi, Venezuelan independence hero
- Bolívar Municipality, Barinas – Simón Bolívar
- Cruz Paredes Municipality - General José de la Cruz Paredes, a prominent llanero hero who fought alongside Bolívar during the War of Independence
- Dominga Ortiz de Páez Parish - Dominga Ortiz Orzúa, First Lady of Venezuela
- Ezequiel Zamora Municipality, Barinas - General Ezequiel Zamora, military figure of the Federal War
- Manuel Palacio Fajardo Parish - Manuel Palacio Fajardo (1784–1819), Venezuelan physician, lawyer, diplomat, and independence hero
- Nicolás Pulido Parish - Nicolás Antonio de Pulido y Briceño (1774–1834), independence hero
- Ramón Ignacio Méndez Parish - Ramón Ignacio Méndez de la Barta (1775–1839), Venezuelan archbishop, politician, and patriot of the republic's independence era
- Rómulo Betancourt Parish - President Rómulo Betancourt
- Rojas Municipality - General Pedro Manuel Rojas (1828-1871), a prominent federalist leader and military figure from Barinas who fought during the Federal War
- Sosa Municipality - General Pedro Felipe Sosa, a local hero of the Federal War and former president of the historic Zamora State (Barinas)

==== Bolívar ====
- Andrés Eloy Blanco Parish - Andrés Eloy Blanco
- Angostura Municipality, Venezuela, formerly called Raúl Leoni Municipality – Venezuelan President Raúl Leoni
- Ascensión Farreras (Bolívar) - General Ascensión Farreras (1785-1865), Afro-Venezuelan military officer
- Cedeño Municipality, Bolívar - General Manuel Cedeño, a fierce llanero cavalry officer and independence hero
- Ciudad Bolívar – Simón Bolívar
- Ciudad Piar and Piar Municipality, Bolívar - Manuel Piar, hero of the Battle of San Félix
- Dalla Costa (Bolívar) - Juan Bautista Dalla-Costa Soublette (1823-1894), a highly respected 19th-century governor of Guayana Province
- José Antonio Páez Parish - José Antonio Páez, independence hero
- Padre Pedro Chien Municipality – Father Pedro Chien (1925–1995), Mongolian-born Catholic missionary, priest, and medical doctor
- Pedro Cova Parish - Pedro Cova (1804–1885), Venezuelan journalist, businessman, and humanist
- Roscio Municipality - Dr. Juan Germán Roscio, main author of the Venezuelan Declaration of Independence (1811)
- Salóm Parish - General Bartolomé Salom, independence hero
- Santa Bárbara Parish (Angostura) - Saint Barbara
- Santa Elena de Uairén - Luisa Elena Fernández (1919-2019), daughter of a explorer Lucas Fernandez Peña
- San Francisco Parish (Angostura) - Saint Francis of Assisi
- San Isidro Parish (Sifontes) - Isidore the Laborer
- Sifontes Municipality – General Antonio Domingo Sifontes (1834-1912), Venezuelan military officer and national hero who defended territorial sovereignty against British expansionism
- Sucre Municipality, Bolívar - Antonio José de Sucre
- Zea Parish - Francisco Antonio Zea, Vice President of Greater Colombia under Simón Bolívar

==== Carabobo ====
- Carlos Arvelo Municipality – Carlos Arvelo, Venezuelan doctor and politician
- Diego Ibarra Municipality - General Diego Ibarra (1798-1852), Independence hero
- Juan José Mora Municipality - General Juan José Mora (1792-1869), Independence hero
- Libertador Municipality, Carabobo - Simón Bolívar
- Miguel Peña Parish - Miguel Peña (politician), independence hero
- Miranda Municipality, Carabobo - Francisco de Miranda

==== Cojedes ====
- Anzoátegui Municipality - José Antonio Anzoátegui, Venezuelan independence hero
- Girardot Municipality, Cojedes - Atanasio Girardot
- Lima Blanco Municipality - Father Leopoldo Lima Blanco (1868–1919), a highly respected Venezuelan theologian and Catholic priest
- Ricaurte Municipality - Antonio Ricaurte
- Rómulo Gallegos Municipality, Cojedes - Rómulo Gallegos, Venezuela's most celebrated 20th-century novelists (author of Doña Bárbara)

==== Delta Amacuro ====
- Almirante Luis Brión (Delta Amacuro) - Luis Brión, Curaçao-born military officer who provided financial and naval support to Venezuela's independence
- Antonio Díaz Municipality, Delta Amacuro - Captain Antonio Díaz (1785-1826), Venezuelan naval officer from Margarita Island
- Francisco Aniceto Lugo Parish (Delta Amacuaro) – Francisco Aniceto Lugo (1894–1982), a multifaceted Venezuelan writer, electrical engineer, educator, journalist, and researcher
- José Vidal Marcano (Delta Amacuro) - José Vidal Marcano, president of the Municipal Council of the Delta Amacuro Federal Territory
- Juan Bautista Arismendi (Delta Amacuro) - General Juan Bautista Arismendi
- Juan Millán (Delta Amacuro) - Juan Millán, Venezuelan fisherman, sailor, and settler from Margarita Island who is celebrated as one of the key founders of Tucupita
- Leonardo Ruiz Pineda (Delta Amacuro) - Leonardo Ruiz Pineda, Venezuelan lawyer and political activist who became a symbol of resistance against dictatorship in the 1950s
- Luis Beltrán Prieto Figueroa (Delta Amacuro) - Luis Beltrán Prieto Figueroa, educator, politician, and philosopher who was a champion of public education
- Mariscal Antonio José de Sucre (Delta Amacuro) - Antonio José de Sucre
- Manuel Piar (Delta Amacuro) - General Manuel Piar
- Manuel Renaud (Delta Amacuro) - José Manuel Renaud (d.1975), influential entrepreneur and community figure
- Monseñor Argimiro García (Delta Amacuro) - Monsignor Argimiro Álvaro García Rodríguez (1905-1991), first bishop of the Apostolic Vicariate of Tucupita
- Padre Barral (Delta Amacuro) - Father Basilio María de Barral (1901-1992), Spanish Capuchin missionary, linguist, and anthropologist
- Rómulo Gallegos (Delta Amacuro) - Rómulo Gallegos
- Santos de Abelgas (Delta Amacuro) - Reverend Father Santos de Abelgas (d.1937), Spanish Roman Catholic missionary priest

==== Falcón ====
- Acosta Municipality, Falcón - José Eusebio Acosta (1824-1882), Federal war hero
- Bolívar Municipality, Falcón - Simón Bolívar
- Cacique Manaure - Cacique Manaure, the chief of the Caquetio people
- Falcón Municipality, Falcón - General Juan Crisóstomo Falcón
- Miranda Municipality, Falcón - Francisco de Miranda
- Monseñor Iturriza Municipality – Monseñor Francisco José Iturriza Guillen (1903–2003), Bishop of Coro
- Petit (Falcón) - the Petit family
- Silva Municipality, Falcón - General José Laurencio Silva, a hero of the Venezuelan War of Independence
- Sucre Municipality, Falcón - Antonio José de Sucre
- Zamora Municipality, Falcón - General Ezequiel Zamora

==== Guárico ====
- Francisco de Miranda (Guárico) - Francisco de Miranda
- José Félix Ribas (Guárico) - General José Félix Ribas
- José Tadeo Monagas Municipality – José Tadeo Monagas
- Juan José Rondón (Guárico) - Colonel Juan José Rondón (1790-1822), Afro-Venezuelan cavalry hero of the War of Independence
- Juan Germán Roscio (Guárico) - Dr. Juan Germán Roscio
- Julián Mellado (Guárico) - Lieutenant Colonel Julián Mellado (1790-1821), an elite patriot cavalry officer
- Leonardo Infante Municipality - Colonel Leonardo Infante (1790-1825), Afro-Venezuelan liberation military commander
- Pedro Zaraza Municipality - General Pedro Zaraza, an independence fighter

==== La Guaira ====
- Carlos Soublette (La Guaira) - General and President Carlos Soublette
- Caruao - Cacique Caruao
- Macuto, Vargas - Cacique Guaicamacuto
- Urimare - Cacique Urimare
- Vargas Municipality - José María Vargas

==== Lara ====
- Andrés Eloy Blanco Municipality, Lara - Andrés Eloy Blanco
- Crespo Municipality - General and President Joaquín Crespo
- Iribarren Municipality - General Juan Guillermo Iribarren (1797-1827), independence hero
- Jiménez Municipality, Lara – General José Florencio Jiménez, Independence hero
- Morán Municipality - General José Trinidad Morán (1796-1854), independence hero
- Palavecino Municipality - Cristóbal Palavecino, a local hero from Lara who joined the independence movement and died fighting in combat in 1817
- Simón Planas Municipality - Simón Planas (1813-1864), statesman and Minister of Interior and Justice
- Torres Municipality - General Pedro León Torres (1788-1822), independence hero
- Urdaneta Municipality, Lara - General Rafael Urdaneta

==== Mérida ====
- Alberto Adriani Municipality – Alberto Adriani Mazzei (1898–1936), economist and writer
- Andrés Bello Municipality, Mérida - Andrés Bello, humanist, poet, writer and diplomat
- Antonio Pinto Salinas Municipality – Antonio Pinto Salinas (1915–1953), Venezuelan poet and martyr of the democracy in 1953
- Antonio Spinetti Dini Parish - Antonio Spinetti Dini (1900-1941), Italian-born Venezuelan poet, journalist, and cultural figure
- Arzobispo Chacón Municipality – Monseñor Acacio Chacon Guerra (1884–1978), Archbishop of Merida
- Campo Elías Municipality - Colonel Vicente Campo Elías (1759-1814), Spanish-born military hero who fought for the Independence of Venezuela
- Caracciolo Parra Olmedo Municipality – Caracciolo Parra Olmedo (1819–1908), Venezuelan lawyer and politician
- Caracciolo Parra Pérez Parish - Dr. Caracciolo Parra Pérez (1888-1964), historian, diplomat, lawyer, and intellectual
- Cardenal Quintero Municipality – José Humberto Quintero Parra, first Roman Catholic Cardinal in Venezuela's history
- Florencio Ramírez Parish - Dr. Florencio Ramírez (1884–1952), Rector of the University of Los Andes (ULA)
- Gabriel Picón González (Mérida) - General Gabriel Picón González (1799-1866), independence officer and hero of Battle of Los Horcones
- Héctor Amable Mora Parish - Héctor Amable Mora (1910-1974), social leader, farmer, explorer, and state public official
- José Nucete Sardi Parish - José Nucete Sardi, historian, journalist and diplomat
- Julio César Salas Municipality - Dr. Julio César Salas (1870-1933), influential ethnologist, lawyer, and founder of the Venezuelan Linguistics chair
- Justo Briceño Municipality - Justo Briceño Otálora (1792-1868), independence hero
- Libertador Municipality, Mérida - Simón Bolívar
- Mariano Picón Salas Parish - Mariano Picón Salas, writer, diplomat, cultural critic, and historian
- Miranda Municipality, Mérida - Francisco de Miranda
- Obispo Ramos de Lora Municipality - Juan Ramos de Lora (1722-1790), first bishop of Mérida
- Padre Noguera Municipality – Father Adonay Noguera (1884–1954), Catholic priest, educator, and community builder
- Rangel Municipality, Mérida - Colonel José Antonio Rangel (1788–1821), independence hero
- Rivas Dávila Municipality - Colonel Luis María Rivas Dávila (1778-1814), independence hero
- Santos Marquina (Mérida) - Captain José de los Santos Marquina (1798-1863)
- Sucre Municipality, Mérida - Antonio José de Sucre
- Tovar Municipality, Mérida - Martín Tovar Ponte (1772-1843)
- Tulio Febres Cordero Municipality - Tulio Febres Cordero, writer, historian, university professor and journalist
- Zea (Mérida) - Francisco Antonio Zea, Vice President of Gran Colombia under Simón Bolívar

==== Miranda ====
- Acevedo Municipality, Miranda - General Miguel Acevedo Acal (d.1870), an independence warrior and Grand General of the Federal War
- Andrés Bello Municipality, Miranda - Andrés Bello
- Arévalo González Parish - Rafael Arévalo González (1866–1935), Venezuelan journalist, writer, and telegraphist
- Brión Municipality, Miranda - Luis Brión, Curaçaoan-born maritime military officer
- Buroz Municipality - Eulalia Ramos (Buroz), Independence heroine
- Cecilio Acosta Parish - Cecilio Acosta, writer, journalist, lawyer, philosopher, and humanist
- Chacao Municipality - Cacique Chacao, a brave indigenous Carib chief who ruled the valley
- Cristóbal Rojas Municipality - Cristóbal Rojas (artist)
- Guaicaipuro Municipality - Cacique Guaicaipuro
- Lander Municipality - Tomás Lander (1787-1845), Venezuelan journalist, writer, and co-founder of the historic Liberal Party
- Los Salias Municipality - Vicente Salias and Francisco Salias (1785-1844)
- Páez Municipality, Miranda - José Antonio Páez
- Paz Castillo Municipality – Blas Juan Paz Castillo (1780-1814), independence hero
- Pedro Gual Municipality – 19th century Venezuelan President Pedro Gual Escandón
- Plaza Municipality - Ambrosio Plaza, independence hero
- Simón Bolívar Municipality, Miranda - Simón Bolívar
- Sucre, Miranda – Antonio José de Sucre
- Urdaneta, Miranda – Rafael Urdaneta
- Zamora Municipality, Miranda - Ezequiel Zamora

==== Monagas ====
- Acosta Municipality, Monagas - General José Eusebio Acosta Peña (1824-1882), federal war caudillo
- Bolívar Municipality, Monagas and Libertador Municipality, Monagas - Simón Bolívar
- Cedeño Municipality, Monagas - General Manuel Cedeño
- Ezequiel Zamora Municipality, Monagas – General Ezequiel Zamora
- Piar Municipality, Monagas - Manuel Piar
- Sotillo Municipality, Monagas - General Juan Antonio Sotillo (1790-1874), hero of both the War of Independence and the Federal War

==== Nueva Esparta ====
- Antolín del Campo Municipality - Lieutenant Colonel Francisco Antolín del Campo, a hero of the Battle of Matasiete
- Arismendi Municipality, Nueva Esparta - Juan Bautista Arismendi
- Antonio Díaz Municipality, Nueva Esparta - Captain Antonio Díaz, a distinguished naval officer during Venezuelan war of Independence
- García Municipality - José María García (1789-1860), a prominent naval officer and engineer
- Gómez Municipality - Francisco Esteban Gómez, independence hero
- Maneiro Municipality - Manuel Plácido Maneiro (1759-1814), influential political figure who served as Margarita's deputy to the 1811 Congress and signed the Venezuelan Declaration of Independence
- Marcano Municipality - Gaspar Marcano (1781-1821), independence officer, lawyer, and renowned intellectual often called "the poet of Margarita's independence"
- Mariño Municipality, Nueva Esparta - General Santiago Mariño, leader of the liberation of eastern Venezuela
- Tubores Municipality - Colonel José Celedonio Tubores (1777-1817), who led local resistance against Spanish General Pablo Morillo
- Vicente Fuentes Parish - Vicente Fuentes Figueroa (1898-1954), Venezuelan poet, short-story writer, and politician associated with the influential "Generación de 1918" literary movement
- Villalba Municipality - Commander Felipe Villalba (d.1817), a distinguished officer of the patriot cavalry

==== Portuguesa ====
- Esteller - Presbytere José Cayetano de la Concepción Esteller Sosa (1813-1891)
- Monseñor José Vicente de Unda - José Vicente de Unda García (1777-1840), Bishop of Mérida
- Páez (Portuguesa) - José Antonio Páez
- Sucre (Portuguesa) - Antonio José de Sucre

==== Sucre ====
- Andrés Eloy Blanco Municipality, Sucre - Andrés Eloy Blanco
- Andrés Mata Municipality - Andrés Mata (1870-1931), poet, journalist, diplomat and co-founder the national newspaper El Universal
- Arismendi Municipality, Sucre - General Juan Bautista Arismendi, Venezuelan independence hero
- Benítez Municipality - Colonel Ramón Benítez, a local patriot and officer during the War of Independence
- Bermúdez Municipality - General José Francisco Bermúdez
- Bolívar Municipality, Sucre and Libertador Municipality, Sucre - Simón Bolívar
- Cajigal Municipality - Juan Manuel Cajigal y Odoardo, Venezuelan mathematician, engineer, and astronomer
- Cruz Salmerón Acosta Municipality - Cruz Salmerón Acosta, poet
- Mariño Municipality, Sucre - Santiago Mariño
- Mejía Municipality - General Francisco de Asís Mejía (1811-1881), a brave general of the Independence War and federalist military leader
- Montes Municipality - Colonel Domingo Montes, independence hero
- Raúl Leoni Parish - President Raúl Leoni
- Ribero Municipality - Colonel José Ribero, independence hero
- Sucre Municipality, Sucre - Antonio José de Sucre
- Valdez Municipality - General Juan Manuel Valdéz, independence hero
- Valentin Valiente Parish - General Valentín Valiente García Mang (1791-1856), independence hero

==== Táchira ====
- Andrés Bello (Táchira) - Andrés Bello
- Antonio Rómulo Costa Municipality, Táchira – Antonio Romulo Costa Duque (1872–1956), Principal of the Liceo Simón Bolívar, President of the Táchira Supreme Court of Justice, and Senator to the National Congress
- Amenodoro Rangel Lamus Parish (Táchira) - Dr. Amenodoro Rangel Lamus (1890-1981), Venezuelan lawyer, educator and former mayor of San Cristóbal
- Bolívar Municipality, Táchira and Libertador - Simón Bolívar
- Cárdenas (Táchira) - Dr. José Ignacio Cárdenas (1826-1872), educator, judge, and Governor of the Province of Táchira
- Eleazar López Contreras Parish - President Eleazar López Contreras
- Emeterio Ochoa Parish - Emeterio Ochoa (1909-1989), founder of Abejales
- Emilio Constantino Guerrero Parish - Emilio Constantino Guerrero (1866-1920), lawyer, writer, diplomat, and brief acting leader/president of Venezuela
- Fernandez Feo Municipality – Monseñor Alejandro Fernández-Feo Tinoco (1908–1987), Bishop of Táchira
- Francisco de Miranda (Táchira) - Francisco de Miranda
- Francisco Romero Lobo Parish - Dr. Francisco Vicente Romero Lobo (1904–1993), Venezuelan surgeon, politician, and diplomat
- García de Hevia - Juan José García de Hevia (1762-1809), captain general and insurgent in the 1781 Revolt of the Comunero
- Isaías Medina Angarita Parish - President Isaías Medina Angarita
- Jauregui Municipality (Táchira) – Monseñor Jesus Manuel Jauregui (1848–1905), renowned priest and educator from the Andean region
- José María Vargas (Táchira) - José María Vargas
- Juan Pablo Peñaloza Parish - Juan Pablo Peñaloza (1855–1932), Venezuelan military leader, educator, and Liberal party member
- Juan Vicente Gómez Parish - President Juan Vicente Gómez
- Manuel Felipe Rugeles (Táchira) - Manuel Felipe Rugeles, poet, journalist, politician, and diplomat
- Michelena (Táchira) - Santos Michelena
- Monseñor Miguel Antonio Salas (Táchira) – Monseñor Miguel Antonio Salas (1915–2003), Bishop of Táchira
- Pedro María Morantes Parish - Pedro María Morantes, lawyer, activist and novelist
- Rafael Urdaneta (Táchira) - General Rafael Urdaneta
- Rivas Berti (Táchira) - Gerardo Rivas Berti (1829–1904), developer of the Great Táchira Railway Company
- Román Cárdenas Parish - Román Cárdenas (1862 –1950), Venezuelan public official, civil engineer, and fiscal reformer
- Samuel Dario Maldonado (Táchira) - Dr. Samuel Darío Maldonado Vivas (1870-1925), a prominent surgeon, anthropologist, writer, and politician from Táchira
- Simón Rodríguez Municipality, Táchira - Simón Rodríguez
- Sucre Municipality, Táchira - Antonio José de Sucre
- Ureña, Táchira - Don Pedro María Ureña (1774-1854), an influential community leader

==== Trujillo ====
- Andrés Bello (Trujillo) - Andrés Bello
- Antonio Nicolás Briceño Parish - Dr. Antonio Nicolás Briceño (1782-1813), lawyer, politician, and military colonel
- Arnoldo Gabaldón Parish - Dr. Arnoldo Gabaldón, physician, researcher and politician
- Bolívar (Trujillo) - Simón Bolívar
- José Felipe Márquez Cañizales (Trujillo) - Dr. José Felipe Márquez Cañizales (1891-1967), lawyer, historian, diplomat, researcher, and educator
- José Gregorio Hernández Parish - Saint José Gregorio Hernández
- José Vicente Campo Elías - Colonel Vicente Campo Elías (1759-1814), Spanish-born military hero who fought for the Independence of Venezuela
- Juan Ignacio Montilla Parish - Juan Ignacio Montilla (1842-1930), community leader, councilman, and cultural patron
- Miranda (Trujillo) - Francisco de Miranda
- Monseñor Carrillo Parish - Monseñor Estanislao Carrillo (1863–1953), an exemplary Catholic priest, educator, and journalist
- Rafael Rangel Municipality – Dr. Rafael Rangel (1877–1909), Venezuelan scientific and father of Venezuelan parasitology
- Sucre (Trujillo) - Antonio José de Sucre
- Urdaneta Municipality, Trujillo - General Rafael Urdaneta

==== Yaracuy ====
- Arístides Bastidas Municipality – Arístides Bastidas, Venezuelan writer, educator and scientist
- Bolívar Municipality, Yaracuy - Simón Bolívar
- Bruzual Municipality - Manuel Ezequiel Bruzual
- José Antonio Páez Municipality - José Antonio Páez
- Manuel Monge Municipality – Manuel Monge (1954–1993), highly respected local social activist, teacher, and community leader
- Peña Municipality - General José Vicente Peña, independence hero
- San Felipe, Venezuela - Philip V of Spain
- Sucre Municipality, Yaracuy - Antonio José de Sucre
- Veroes Municipality - José Joaquín Veroes (1789-1855), Afro-Venezuelan military hero

==== Zulia ====
- Almirante Padilla Municipality - José Prudencio Padilla, Neogranadine military leader
- Ana María Campos (Zulia) - Ana María Campos, a famous Zulian heroine and martyr of the Venezuelan War of Independence
- Antonio Borjas Romero Parish - Dr. Antonio Borjas Romero (1913–1992), Eternal Rector of the University of Zulia
- Arístides Calvani (Cabimas) - Arístides Calvani Silva (1918-1986), Venezuelan politician, academic, and diplomat
- Agustín Codazzi Parish - Agostino Codazzi, Italian-Venezuelan geographer
- Baralt Municipality - Rafael María Baralt, Venezuelan writer, diplomat, historian, and philologist
- Carlos Quevedo (Zulia) - Carlos Quevedo (d.1923), a respected local figure and community pioneer from the Sur del Lago subregion
- Carmen Herrera Parish - Carmen Herrera (1892-1993), midwife, nurse and community server
- Ciudad Ojeda – Alonso de Ojeda
- Colón (Zulia) - Christopher Columbus
- Domitila Flores (Zulia) - Domitila Flores, independence heroine
- Donaldo García (Zulia) - Donaldo García Martínez (1836-1869), a respected civic leader and military academic from the Perijá region
- Eleazar López Contreras (Zulia) - President Eleazar López Contreras
- Elías Sánchez Rubio (Guajira) - Elías Sánchez Rubio (1881–1927), poet
- Faria (Zulia) - Colonel Francisco María Farías, a prominent Zulian military officer and hero of the Venezuelan independence struggle
- Francisco Eugenio Bustamante Parish - Dr. Francisco Eugenio Bustamante Urdaneta (1839–1921), Venezuelan physician, surgeon, scientist, and academic
- Francisco Javier Pulgar Municipality – Francisco Javier Pulgar (1877–1959), Venezuelan educator
- Francisco Ochoa (Zulia) - Dr. Francisco Ochoa (1849–1907), first rector of the University of Zulia
- Germán Ríos Linares (Zulia) - Germán Ríos Linares (1915-1982), Venezuelan educator, social advocate, and political leader
- Ildefonso Vásquez Parish - Dr. Ildefonso Vásquez (1840–1920), Venezuelan physician, poet, journalist, playwright, and educator
- Jesús Enrique Lossada Municipality – Jesus Enrique Lossada (1892–1948), intellectual, writer, and rector of the University of Zulia
- Jesús María Semprún Municipality - Dr. Jesús María Semprún (1877-1931), recognized physician, journalist, and literary critic
- Jorge Hernández Parish - Jorge Hernández (1915-1964), oil worker and union leader
- José Domingo Rus (Zulia) - José Domingo Rus (1768-1835), a Zulian lawyer and representative of Maracaibo to the Spanish Cortes in the early 19th century who advocated for the region's autonomy.
- José Ramón Yépez Parish - José Ramón Yepes (1822–1881), 19th-century Venezuelan sailor, military officer, politician, writer, and poet
- La Cañada de Urdaneta Municipality - General Rafael Urdaneta
- Luis de Vicente Parish - Father Luis De Vicente Rios (1877–1905), priest
- Luis Hurtado Higuera Parish - Luis Hurtado Higuera (1913–1954), Venezuelan labor leader, trade union organizer, broadcaster, and political activist
- Manuel Dagnino Parish - Dr. Manuel Dagnino (1834-1901), Italian-Venezuelan physician, educator, writer, and philosopher
- Manuel Guanipa Matos (Zulia) - Dr. Manuel Guanipa Matos (1939-1978), lawyer
- Manuel Manrique (Zulia) - General Manuel Manrique (1793–1823), a distinguished Venezuelan independence hero
- Mara Municipality - Cacique Mara, a powerful indigenous chieftain who fiercely resisted the early Spanish conquistadors
- Marcial Hernández (Zulia) - José René Marcial Hernández Áñez (1874-1921), a celebrated Zulian physician, poet, historian, and orator
- Mariano Parra León Parish - Monseñor Mariano Parra León (1920-1989), Bishop of Cumaná
- Miranda (Zulia) - Francisco de Miranda
- Monseñor Arturo Álvarez Parish - Monseñor Arturo Celestino Álvarez (1870-1952), Bishop of Zulia
- Monseñor Marcos Sergio Godoy (Mara) - Monseñor Marcos Sergio Godoy (1893-1957), bishop of the Diocese of Maracaibo
- Raúl Cuenca (Zulia) - Raúl Cuenca (1866-1945), Venezuelan educator and engineer
- Raúl Leoni Parish (Maracaibo) – President Raúl Leoni
- Rómulo Betancourt (Zulia) - President Rómulo Betancourt
- Rómulo Gallegos (Zulia) - President Rómulo Gallegos
- Simón Bolívar Municipality, Zulia - Simón Bolívar
- Sixto Zambrano (Zulia) - Sixto Facundo Zambrano (1920-1970), Venezuelan community leader and transport worker
- Sucre Municipality, Zulia - Antonio José de Sucre
- Udón Pérez Parish - Udón Pérez (1871-1926), Venezuelan poet, playwright, and writer
- Valmore Rodríguez Municipality – Valmore Rodríguez (1900–1955), Venezuelan journalist and president of national congress

=== Vietnam ===
- Bế Văn Đàn (Quảng Hòa) – Bế Văn Đàn (1931–1954), Hero of the People's Armed Forces
- Đề Thám (Lạng Sơn) – Hoàng Hoa Thám "Đề Thám" (1858–1913), leader of Yên Thế Insurrection
- Đình Phong (Cao Bằng) – Đình Phong, a communist soldier
- Đình Phùng, Bảo Lạc – Phan Đình Phùng (1847–1895), Vietnamese poet
- Dương Minh Châu district and Duong Minh Chau town – Dương Minh Châu (1912–1947), a communist lawyer
- Ho Chi Minh City – Ho Chi Minh, President of Vietnam
- Hồ Thị Kỷ (Cà Mau) – Hồ Thị Kỷ (1949–1970), martyr heroine
- Hoàng Văn Thụ, Văn Lãng – Hoàng Văn Thụ (1909–1944), Vietnamese revolutionary
- Hồng Dân (Bạc Liêu) – Trần Hồng Dân (1916–1946), nationalist revolutionary
- Kim Đồng, Thạch An – Kim Đồng (1929–1943), captain of Ho Chi Minh Young Pioneer Organization
- Le Thanh Nghi (Hai Phong) – Le Thanh Nghi (1911-1989), Vice President of Vietnam
- Ngọc Hiển (Cà Mau) – Phan Ngọc Hiển (1910–1941), a local teacher, writer and artist
- Nguyễn Huân (Cà Mau) – Nguyễn Văn Huân (d.1946), communist martyr
- Nông trường Trần Phú – Trần Phú, Vietnamese revolutionary
- Phạm Văn Cội (Củ Chi) – Phạm Văn Cội (1940–1967), Hero of the People's Armed Forces
- Quang Trung, An Lão (Hải Phòng) – Quang Trung, second emperor of the Tây Sơn dynasty
- Trần Hưng Đạo (Lý Nhân) – Trần Hưng Đạo, an imperial prince, statesman and military commander
- Trần Văn Thời district and Trần Văn Thời town – Trần Văn Thời (1902–1942), a local communist
- Lý Văn Lâm District – Lý Văn Lâm (1941–1969), a local communist

Former:

- Thành Thái Phien – the name of Da Nang in 1945 – revolutionary Thái Phiên

=== Yemen ===
- Bayt al-Faqih - Ahmad ibn Ujayl, jurist
- Saddam (Al-Mesaimeer) - Saddam Hussein

=== Zambia ===
- Dag Hammerskjoeld (Ndola) – Dag Hammarskjöld
- Harry Mwaanga Nkumbula (Lusaka) – Harry Nkumbula, Zambian nationalist leader
- Helen Kaunda (Copperbelt) – Ms. Helen Kaunda (d.1973), mother of President Kenneth Kaunda
- Julia Chikamoneka (Kasama) – Julia Chikamoneka (1910–1986), Zambian freedom fighter
- Livingstone – doctor David Livingstone
- Lusaka – Chief Lusaka
- Mansa, Zambia – Chief Mansa
- Victoria Falls – Queen Victoria

Former:

- Abercorn was the name of Mbala – Lord Abercorn, British nobleman and diplomat
- Bancroft was the name of Chililabombwe – Joseph Austen Bancroft (1882–1957), Canadian geologist and scientist
- Fort Jameson was the name of Chipata – Leander Starr Jameson, British statesman
- Fort Rosebery was the name of Mansa, Zambia – Archibald Primrose, 5th Earl of Rosebery, Prime Minister of the United Kingdom

=== Zimbabwe ===
- Beatrice, Zimbabwe – Beatrice Borrow (1868–1946), the sister of Lieutenant Henry J. Borrow, member of the Pioneer Column
- Beitbridge – Alfred Beit
- Bradfield, Zimbabwe – Edwin Eugene Bradfield (1869–1950)
- Felixburg – Felix Posselt, who visited in that area in 1888
- Montgomery (Bulawayo) – Bernard Montgomery
- Mount Darwin, Zimbabwe – Charles Darwin
- Mount Hampden – John Hampden
- Norton, Zimbabwe – the Norton family
- Selous, Zimbabwe – Frederick Selous
- Victoria Falls – Queen Victoria
- West Nicholson – Andy Nicholson, an early prospector
- Zhombe Joel – Joel Tessa, one of the pioneer businessmen at the centre during the 1960s.

Former:

- Fort Victoria was the name of Masvingo – Queen Victoria
- Hartley was the name of Chegutu – Henry Hartley, an early explorer
- Salisbury was the name of Harare – Lord Salisbury

== See also ==
- Lists of places named after people
  - List of countries named after people
  - List of country subdivisions named after people
  - List of islands named after people
- Buildings and structures named after people
  - List of eponyms of airports
  - List of convention centers named after people
  - List of railway stations named after people
- List of colleges and universities named after people
- List of etymologies of administrative divisions
- List of country-name etymologies
- Lists of places by eponym
- List of eponyms (A–K)
- List of eponyms (L–Z)
- Lists of etymologies
