= French Argentines =

Argentines of French birth or descent

Franco-Argentin (French) Franko-argentinarrak (Basque) Franco-argentino (Spanish)
- (Argentina) (France)
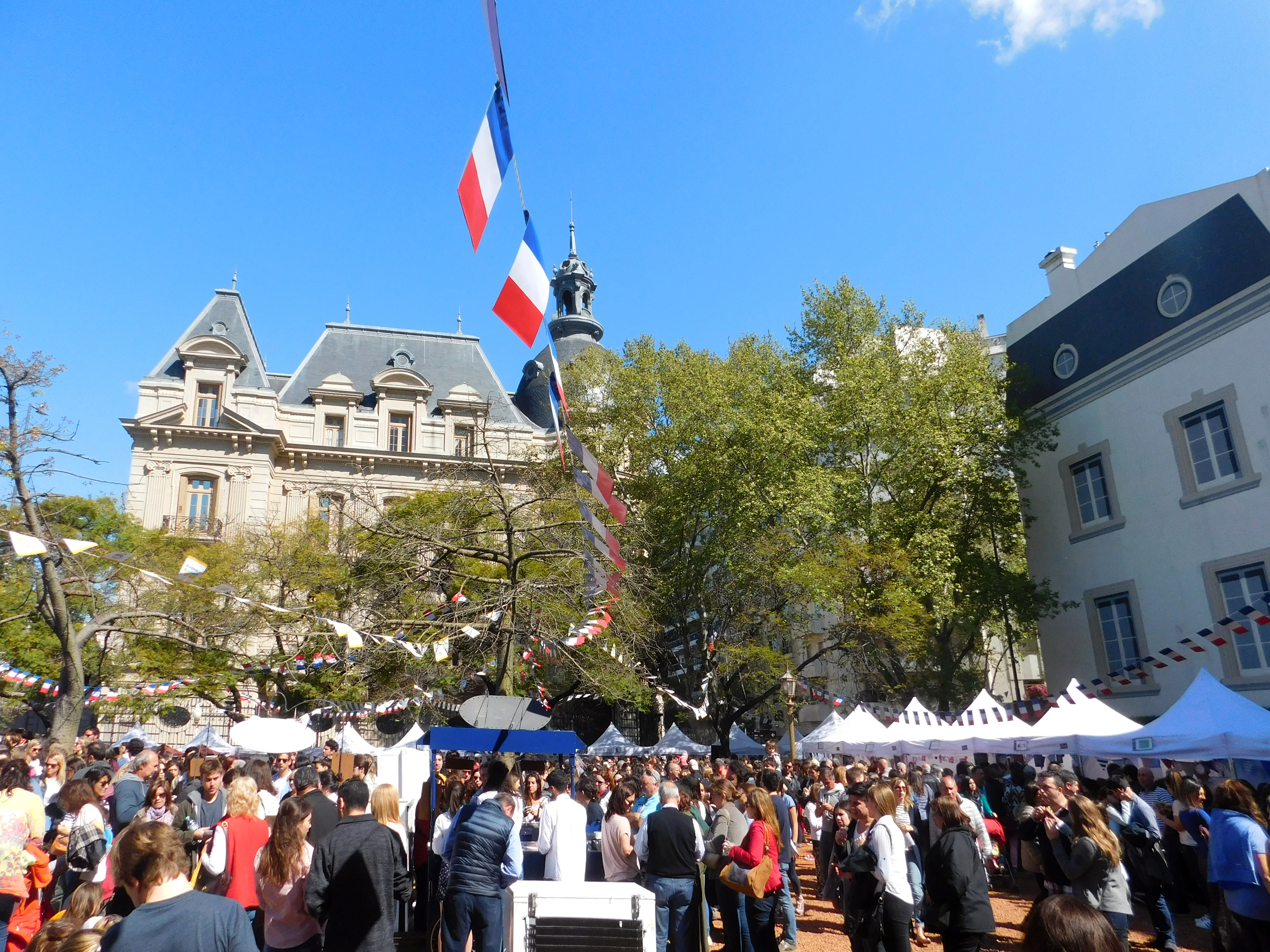
- Argentines of French descent during French Week in Buenos Aires (2016)

Total population
- 9,953 (by birth, 2023); 8,000,000 (by ancestry); 17% of Argentina's population

Regions with significant populations
- Throughout Argentina (Plurality in the Pampas)

Languages
- Majority: Spanish. Minority: French, Occitan and Basque.

Religion
- Majority: Roman Catholicism; Minority: Irreligion

Related ethnic groups
- French people · French Americans · French Brazilians · French Uruguayans

French Argentines (French: Franco-Argentins; Spanish: franco-argentinos) refers to Argentine citizens of full or partial French or French Basque ancestry or persons born in France who reside in Argentina. French Argentines form one of the largest ancestry groups after Italian Argentines and Spanish Argentines. Between 1857 and 1960, 400,000 French people immigrated to Argentina. Besides immigration from continental France, Argentina also received, as early as the 1840s, immigrants with French background from neighboring countries, notably Uruguay, which expanded the French Argentine community. It is estimated that around 8 million Argentines had some degree of French ancestry, up to 17% of the total population.

Argentines of French descent make up a substantial proportion of the Argentine population, but they are less visible than other similarly-sized ethnic group because of the high degree of assimilation and the lack of substantial French colonies throughout the country.

== French immigration to Argentina ==
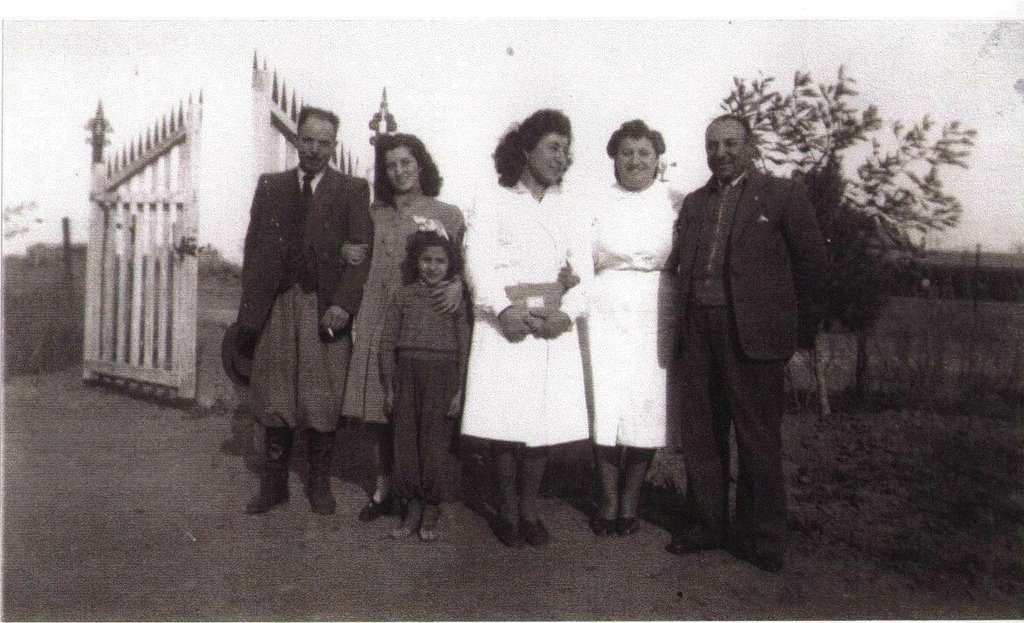
French immigrants in Bahía Blanca around 1940.

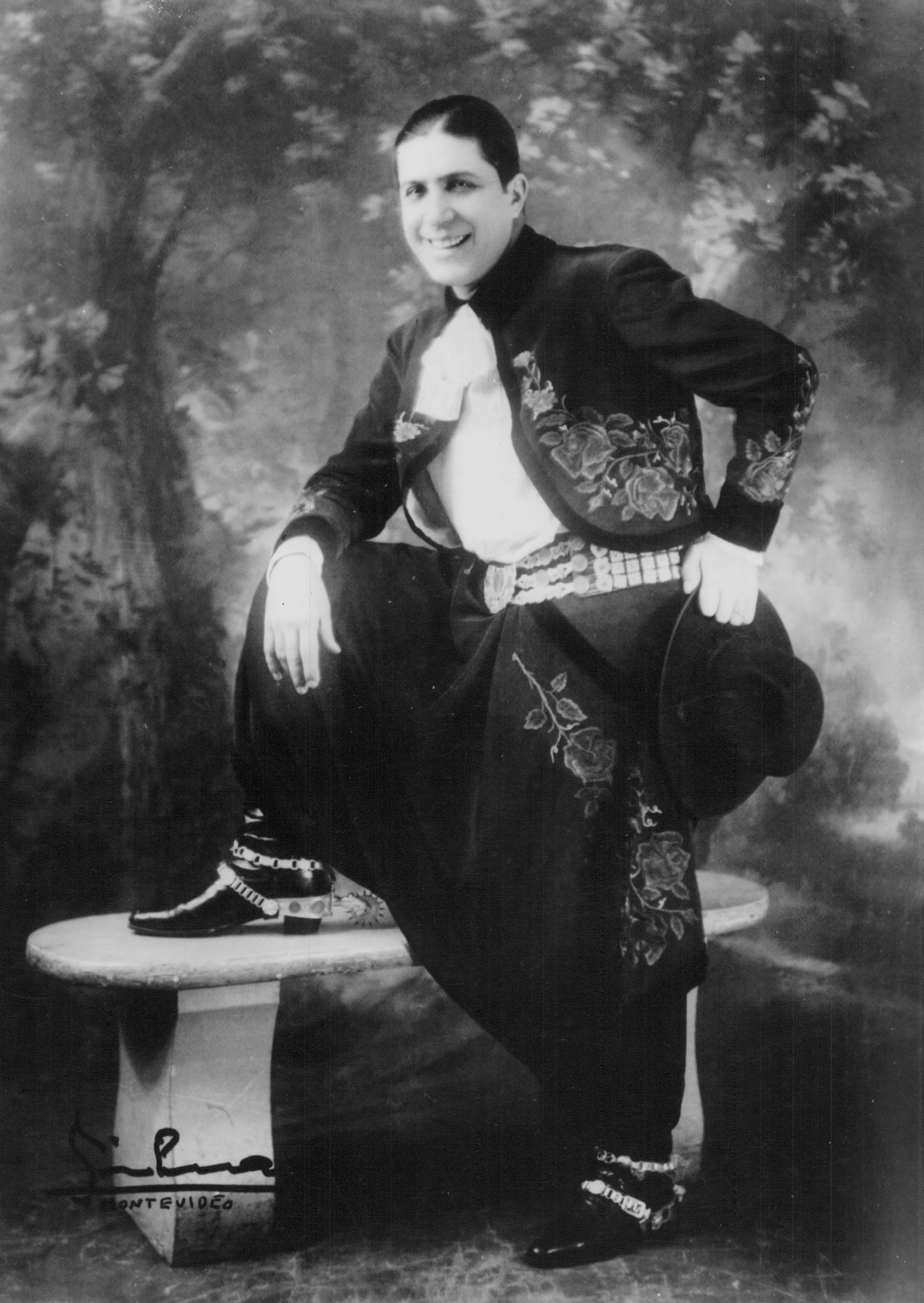
Carlos Gardel was a French Argentine known for being the greatest figure of Tango.

During the first half of the 19th century, most of French immigrants to the New World settled in the United States and in Uruguay. While the United States received 195,971 French immigrants between 1820 and 1855, only 13,922 Frenchmen, most of them from the Basque Country and Béarn, left for Uruguay between 1833 and 1842. During this period of time, Uruguay received most of French immigrants to South America as the conflictual relationship between Rosas and the French government had created a xenophobic climate against French immigrants in the Buenos Aires province. After the fall of Rosas in 1852, Argentina overtook Uruguay and became the main pole of attraction for French immigrants in Latin America.

Percentage of French immigrants within Argentina's subdivisions, according to the 1914 Argentine census.

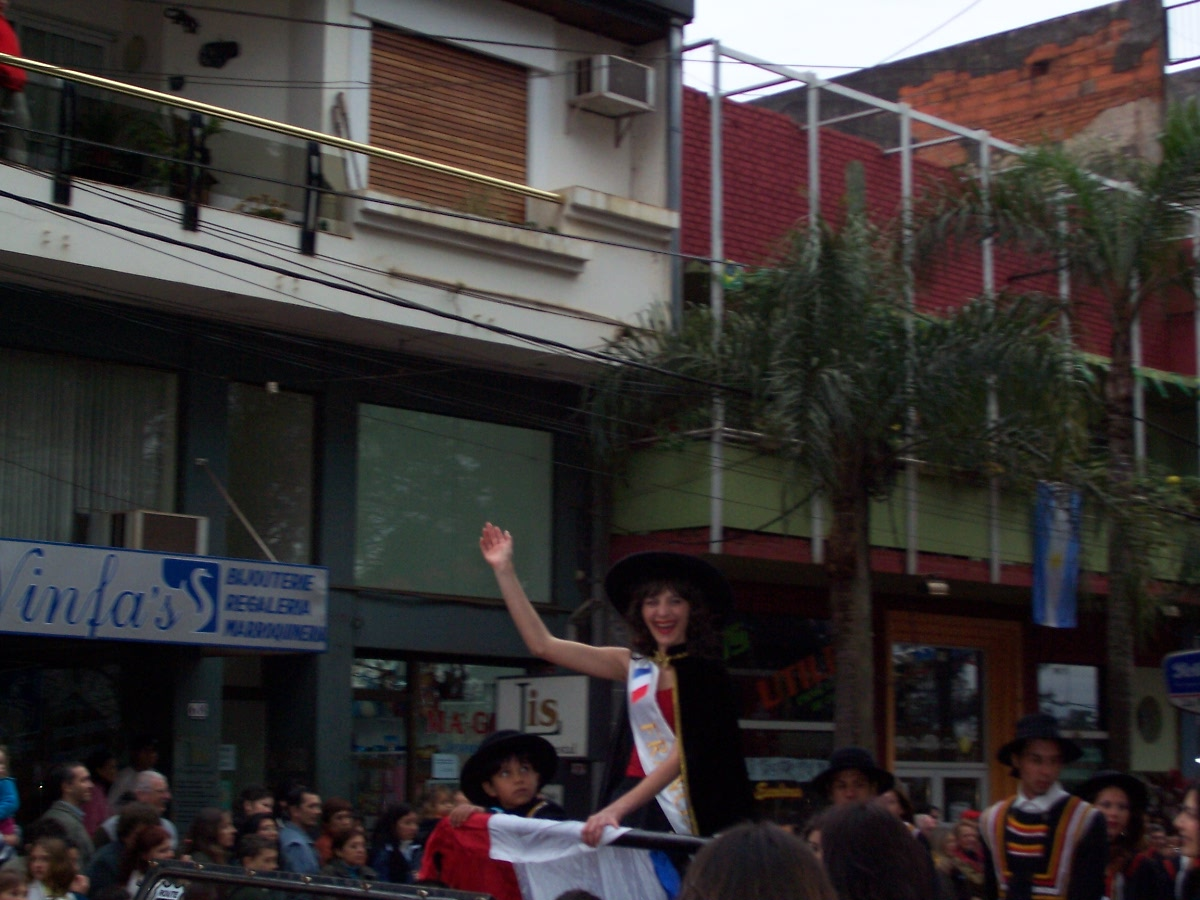
The queen of the French Argentines at the XXXIV Immigrant's Festival in Oberá, Misiones.

From the second half of the 19th century to the first half of the 20th century, Argentina received the second largest group of French immigrants worldwide, second only to the United States. Between 1857 and 1946 Argentina received 239,503 French immigrants - out of which 105,537 permanently settled in the country. By 1976, 116,032 had settled in Argentina. French immigration to Argentina can be divided in three main periods, as follows: France was the third source of immigration to Argentina before 1890, constituting over 10% of immigrants, only surpassed by Italians and Spaniards; from 1890 to 1914, immigration from France, although reduced, was still significant; lastly, after WWI, the flow of French immigrants was minimal and only grew again after WWII to finally stop in the 1950s.

In 1810, Buenos Aires had a population of 28,528 inhabitants, including 13 French citizens. At the beginning of the 19th century, French immigration to Argentina was not substantial. Mainly constituted of political exiles and former officers from the imperial army, it became more considerable from the year 1825, reaching up to 1,500-2,000 French immigrants some years. In 1839, it was estimated that 4,000 Frenchmen were living in the province of Buenos Aires, this figure increased to 12,000 in 1842. From the next decade, French people started to migrate to Argentina in large numbers.

During the first period (1852–1890), French immigration was similar, in numbers and in features, to that of Italians and Spaniards. It belonged to a larger movement of emigration of Basque people, from both sides of the Pyrenees. French formed the largest group of immigrants to Argentina until 1854. The country received 1,484 French immigrants in 1856, Frenchmen still were the second most important immigrant group after Italians. The number of French immigrants present in the Buenos Aires Province reached 25,000 in 1859. In 1861, 29,196 Frenchmen were registered in Argentina, including 14,180 living in the city of Buenos Aires where they represented the third largest foreign community and made up 7.5% of the population. In 1869, at the time of the first national census, 32,383 Frenchmen lived in the country, or about 1.7% of the total population. Immigration from France increased dramatically in the first half of the 1870s (with a peak in 1873) and in the second half of the 1890s (61,382 immigrants in a three-year period). The last rise in figures is due to a policy conducted by the Argentine government in order to reduce the increasing importance of Italian immigration, for that purpose 132,000 free travel tickets were distributed in Europe between 1888 and 1890, 45,000 out of them were given in France. In 1887, there were 20,031 Frenchmen living in Buenos Aires, 4.6% of the 433,421 inhabitants.

During the second stage (from 1890 to 1914), French immigration was more similar to those of Germans and Britons, and was characterized by a reduced net migration rate, with the exception of the year 1912 when immigration raised as a result of propaganda led by the Argentine government in Southern France to fill in the gap caused by the prohibition of emigration from Italy to Argentina in 1911. In 1895, after the largest wave of French immigrants had settled in Argentina, they were 94,098, i.e. 2.3% of the total population (33,185 of them were living in the city of Buenos Aires where they represented the third largest foreign community and made up 4.9% of the population). Only the United States had a higher number of French expatriates, with over 100,000 Frenchmen having immigrated there. At the turn of the 20th century figures started to decrease as immigration from France declined and previously established immigrants merged within the population. It was estimated that 100,000 Frenchmen were living in Argentina in 1912, 67% of the 149,400 Frenchmen living in Latin America and the second largest community worldwide after the United States (125,000). In 1914, 79,491 Frenchmen were registered, accounting for 1% of the Argentine population. Between 1895 and 1914, French immigrants are the only foreign group in Argentina whose numbers (both absolute and relative) shrank in the total population.

The flow decreased dramatically during WWI. After 1918, French immigrants to Argentina numbered 1,500 per year and had a slightly positive net migration rate. The flow of French immigrants then gradually dried up. In the 1960s, around 4,000 Pieds-Noirs immigrated to Argentina from the newly independent Algeria, they constituted the last large migration from France to Argentina.

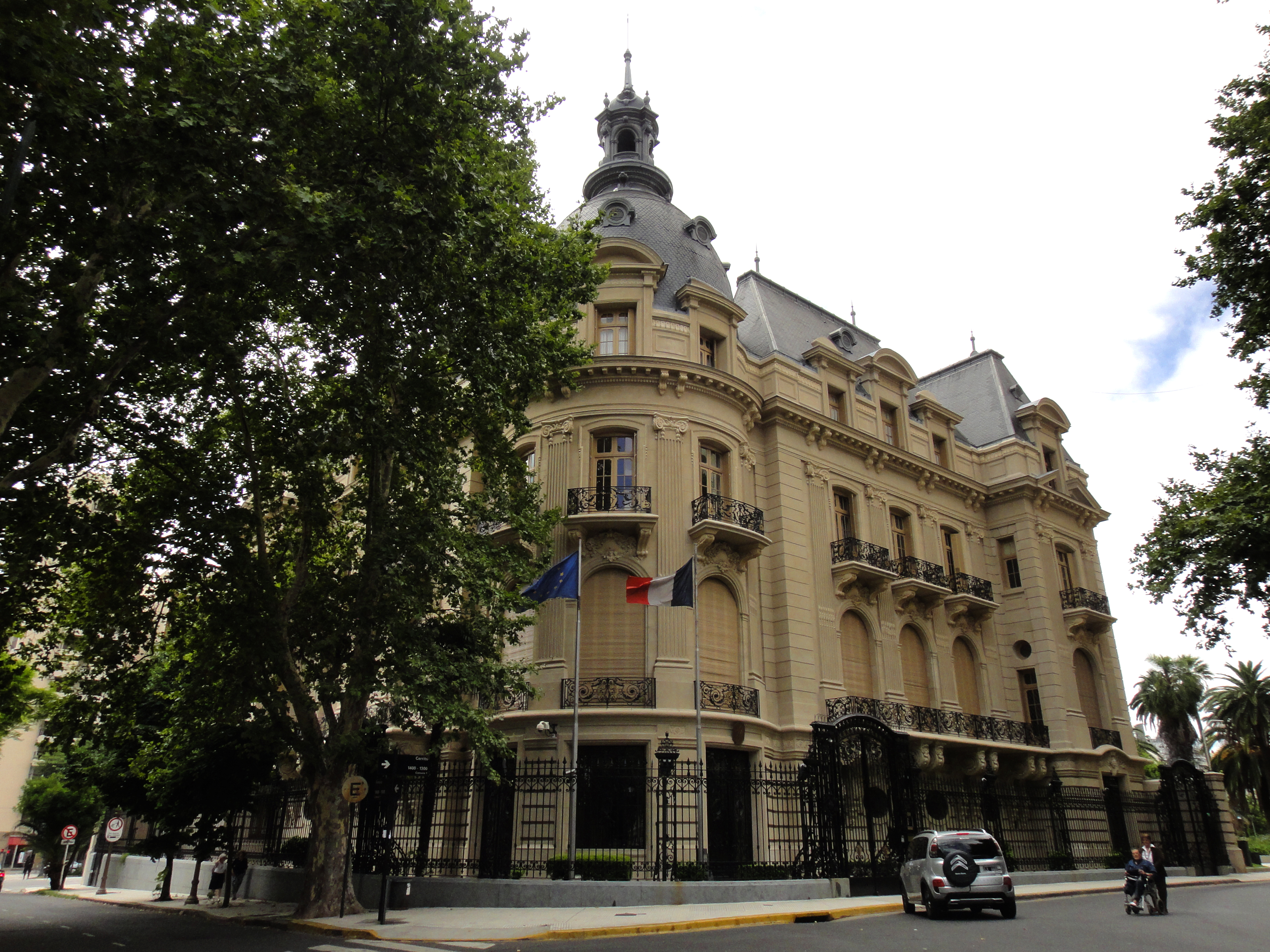
The Ortiz Basualdo Palace is currently the French Embassy in Buenos Aires, Argentina.

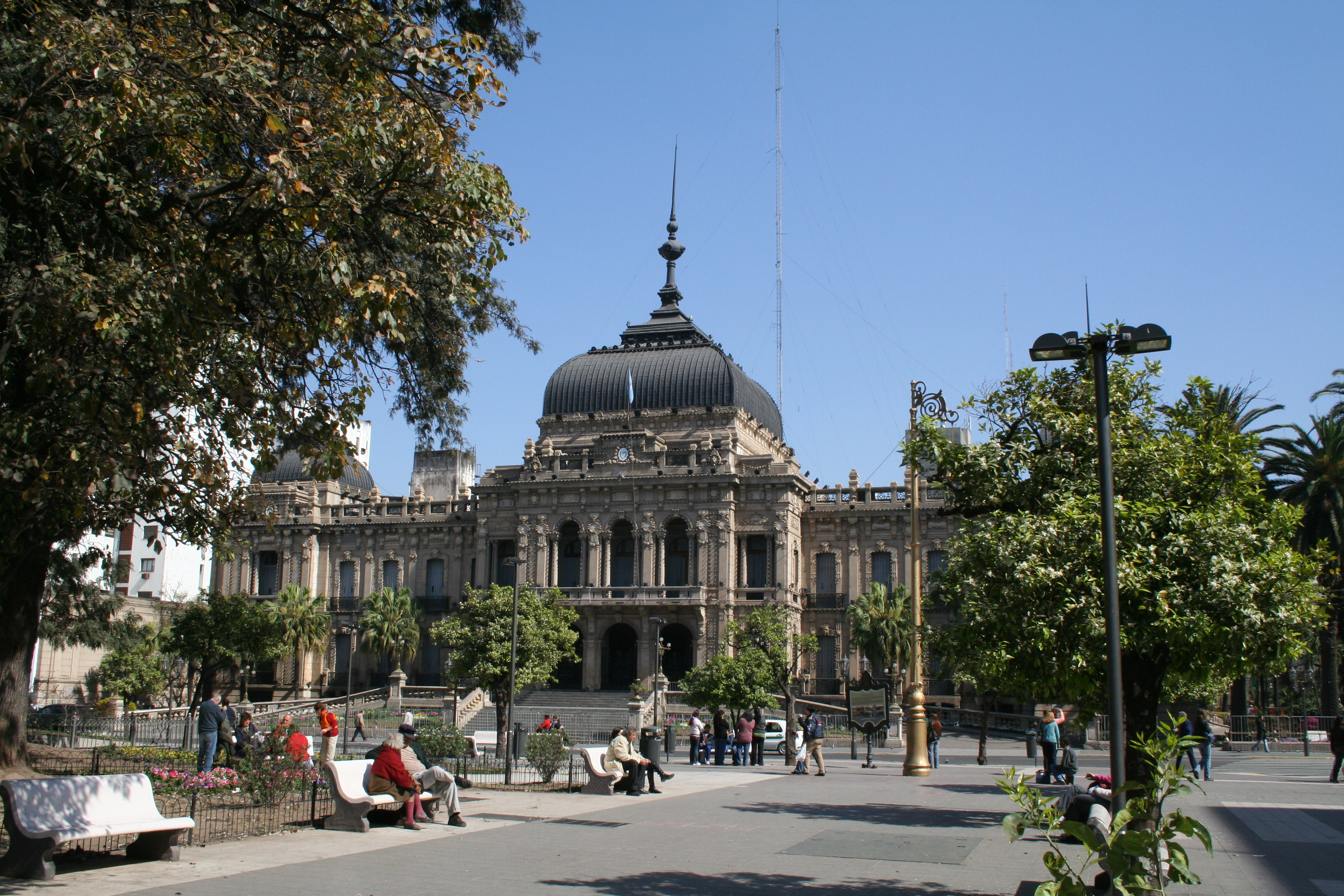
The Tucumán Government Palace, one of the many Beaux-Arts architecture palaces in Argentina.

French immigration represented 5% of the flow of immigrants to Argentina until the 1870s, reached its maximum (around 12% of immigrants) in the 1870s-1880s, decreased to 4% at the end of the 20th century, and only represented 1% of immigrants in the 1920s. The year 1890, when it culminated (22% of immigrants), shows the decline of French immigration to Argentina, at the moment when the phenomenon of mass immigration to Argentina started. This is probably due to the financial crisis in 1890 and to an early demographic shift in France: population growth was slow between 1890 and 1913, limiting the need for emigration, contrary to neighboring European countries. Immigration to Argentina also showed a shift in the 1890s: while from 1860 to 1890, most of immigrants from the European countryside settled in the countryside, from 1890 to 1930 they started to settle in the cities. This could explain why French immigrants, most of them from a rural background, were more drawn to settle in North America from 1890 onwards, where access to land property was easier.

Half of French immigrants until the second half of the 20th century came from Southwestern France, especially from the Basque Country, Béarn (Basses-Pyrénées accounted for more than 20% of immigrants), Bigorre and Rouergue. Other important groups came from Savoy and the Paris region. It was estimated that at least 70% of French immigrants in Tandil were coming from the Southwestern part of the country and that half of them were of Basque stock. Until the 1880s, the great majority of French immigrants to Argentina were from the Pyrenees. Basques started settling in Argentina in the 1830s, then they began heading towards Chile and the United States in the 1870s.

Today it is estimated that up to 17% of Argentines have partial French ancestry. French Argentines formed a large portion of the elite of the country. In 1959 it was estimated that 7% of the upper-class of Buenos Aires was of French background, their ancestors having settled in the country between 1840 and 1880.

While found throughout the country, they are most numerous in Buenos Aires, Santa Fe, Entre Ríos, Córdoba, Mendoza and Tucumán provinces. According to the national census of 1895, 37.3% of Frenchmen settled in Argentina lived in the province of Buenos Aires, 35.2% in the city of Buenos Aires, 10.9% in Santa Fe and 5.1% in Entre Ríos. In the Buenos Aires province, they mostly settled south of a line uniting the partidos of Tandil and Azul, their presence being particularly noticeable in the town of Pigüé.

As of 2010, almost 15,000 French citizens are living in Argentina, the community may be higher though.

== French colonies in Argentina ==
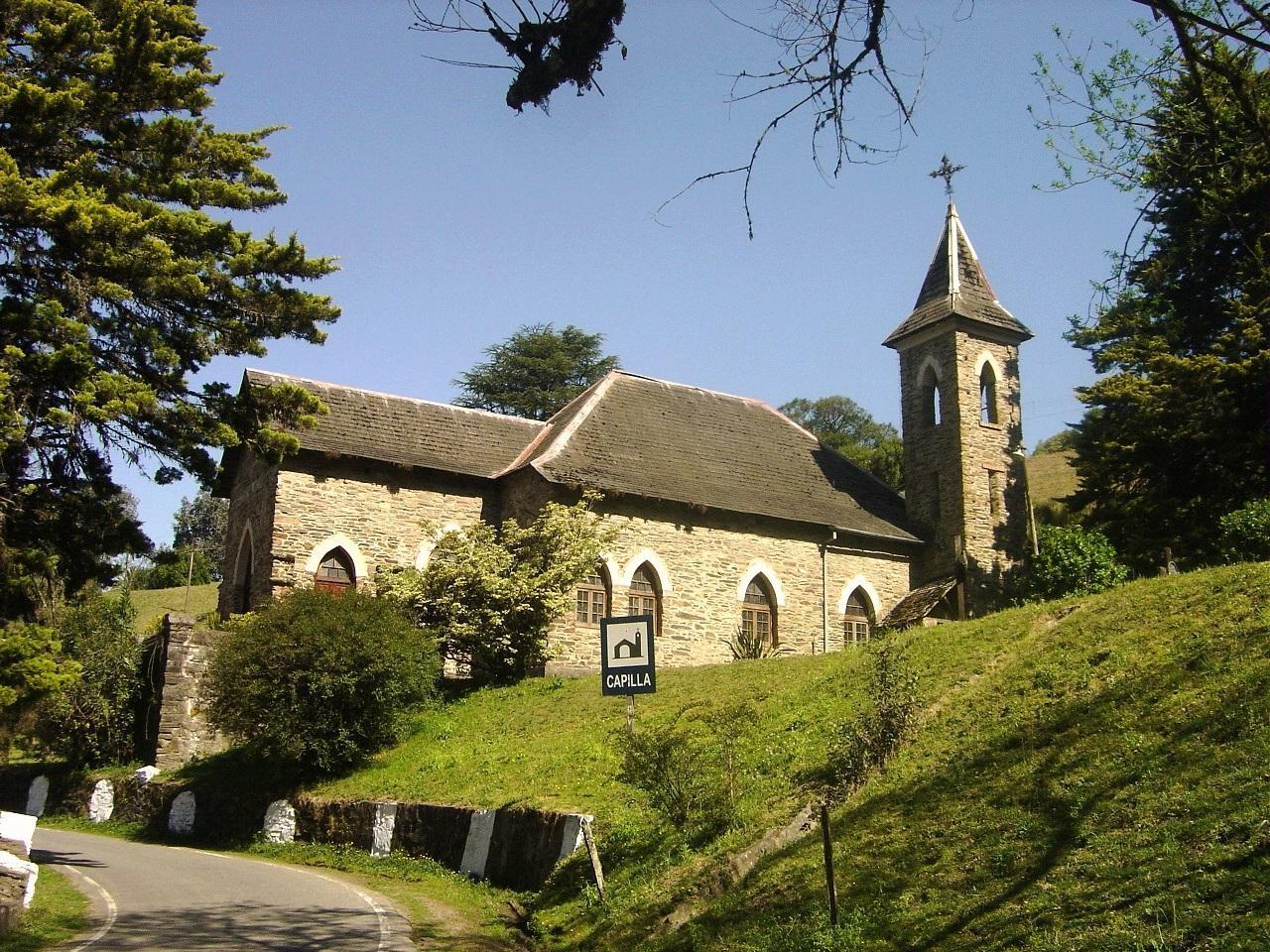
A Catholic chapel in Villa Nougués, Tucumán.

In 1857, an immigrant from Béarn, Alejo Peyret, founded the first farming colony in Entre Ríos, San José. In 1864, out of 380 families living in San José, 125 were from Savoy.

The town of Pigüé, founded by 165 Occitan-speaking French immigrants from Rouergue in 1884, is considered a focal center of French culture in Argentina. It is estimated that 30% to 40% of Pigüé's modern inhabitants can trace their roots to Aveyron and they still speak Occitan.

According to the 1869 census, a quarter of immigrants to the province of Mendoza were from France. In 1895, they made up 15% of immigrants of the province, right after Italians and Spaniards (26.1% and 17.3% respectively). Frenchmen were particularly numerous in the wine-producing departments of Maipú, Luján and in the French colony of San Rafael, founded by engineer Julio Gerónimo Balloffet.

In 1904, the governor of Tucumán founded a town carrying his name, Villa Nougués, as a replica of Boutx in Haute-Garonne, a French village where his family traced their roots back to.

In most cases, however, the French immigrants were not numerous enough to remain distinct from other Argentines. There was no religious barrier for the most part, with the vast majority being Catholics. The language barrier to learning Castilian was also low, especially for the native French and Occitan speakers, and they picked up Castilian quickly.

== Legacy ==
French immigration has left a significant mark on Argentina, with a notable influence on the arts, culture, science and society of the country. In particular, many emblematic buildings in cities like Buenos Aires, Rosario, and Córdoba were built following French Beaux-Arts and neoclassical styles, such as the Argentine National Congress, the Metropolitan Cathedral, or the Central Bank building. In particular, landscape architect Carlos Thays, in his position as 1891 Director of Parks and Walkways, is largely responsible for planting thousands of trees, creating the Buenos Aires Botanical Garden and giving the city much of its parks and plazas that are sometimes compared to similar designs in Paris.

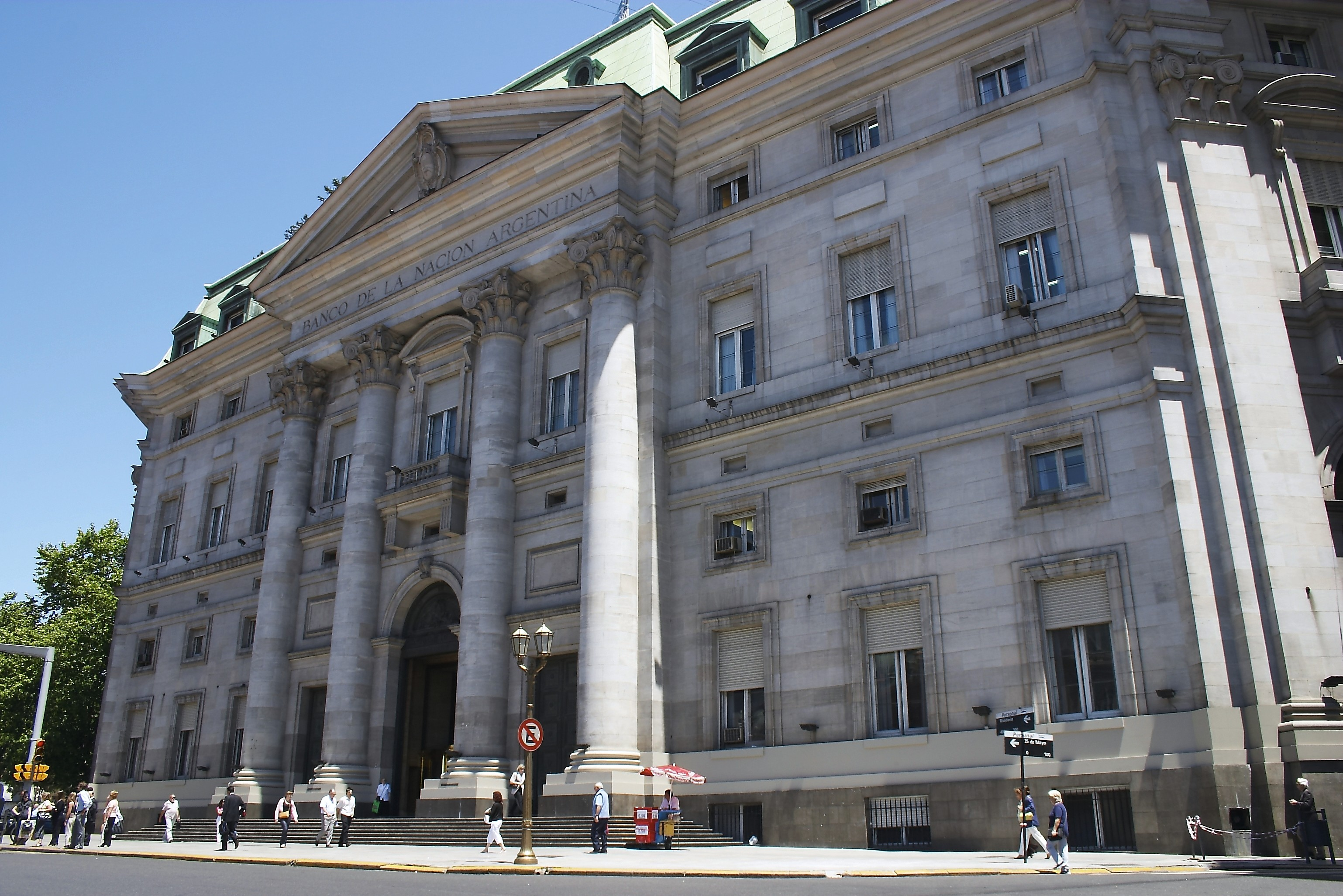
The National Bank building in Buenos Aires.

Important contributions to the arts include the works of Eugène Py, considered the founding pioneer of Argentine cinema, as well as the development of new literary genres by writers like Paul Groussac or Julio Cortázar. In the field of science, two Argentine Nobel Prize laurates were of French descent, Bernardo Houssay, 1947 laurate in Medicine, and Luis Federico Leloir, 1970 laurate in Chemistry.

Four former heads of state were born to French fathers: Supreme Directors Juan Martín de Pueyrredón and José Rondeau, as well as Presidents Carlos Pellegrini and Hipólito Yrigoyen, while several others had French ancestry, including Juan Perón, and de facto military Presidents Alejandro Lanusse, Carlos Lacoste, and Alfredo Saint-Jean. Former First Lady Eva Perón also had French background.

In 1851, Captain Louis Tardy de Montravel wrote that the city of Buenos Aires was stamped by French influence, French literature and language being there more widespread than anywhere else. According to him, this preference for France was not due to a capricious and brief craze, rather the result of a natural liking and a perfect similarity between French and Argentine characters, underlining the same lightness of being, the same quick-wittedness and liveliness, as well as the same kindness to foreigners and the similar ability for international influence.

=== Lunfardo ===
Lunfardo is an argot of the Castilian language as spoken in Argentina which appeared in Buenos Aires at the end of the 19th century. It encompasses a lot of words and expressions from languages spoken by immigrants, notably Italians, Spaniards and French. Lunfardo is heavily used in tango lyrics. After 1912, as tango became popular in Paris, French expressions were incorporated into tango lyrics and made their way into Lunfardo. It has now become an integral part of the Castilian spoken in Argentina and some of these words are still used on a daily basis.

==== Examples ====
- Beguén - Crush (from the French béguin -crush-)
- Bulín - Digs (from the French boulin -hole in the wall of a dovecote where the pigeons nest-)
- Buyón - Food (from the French bouillon -broth-)
- Calotear - To steal (from the French calotter -to steal-)
- Dragonear - To flirt (from the French draguer -to flirt-)
- Fané - Worn out (from the French fané -withered-)
- Franelear - To caress, to heavy pet (from the French faire flanelle -to go to a whorehouse without making use of any woman-)
- Macro - Pimp (from the French maquereau -pimp-)
- Marote - Head (from the French marotte -hatstand-)
- Ragú - Hunger (from the French ragoût -stew-)
- Toilette - Bathroom (from the French toilettes -bathroom-)

== Argentine localities with names originating from France ==
=== Buenos Aires Province ===
- Ángel Etcheverry, named after a provincial Minister of Public Works of French-Basque ancestry.
- Bellocq, named after the Bellocq family who donated lands to build the village.
- Berdier, named after the Berdier family, former owner of the land.
- Bordenave
- Boulogne Sur Mer, named after the French city where San Martín died.
- Cadret, named after the Cadret family.
- Carlos Beguerie
- Daireaux, named after Emilio Daireaux, former owner of the land.
- D'Orbigny, named after French naturalist Alcide d'Orbigny.
- Dudignac, named after Ezequiel Dudignac, former owner of the land.
- Dufaur
- Gardey, named after Juan Gardey of Bearnese ancestry.
- Grand Bourg, named after the French village of Grand-Bourg, where the leader of the Argentine War of Independence, General José de San Martín, lived in exile - now a neighborhood of Évry.
- Gregorio de Laferrère
- Ingeniero Adolfo Sourdeaux, named after the founder of the city, Adolfo Sourdeaux.
- Juan Cousté
- Lanús, named after Anacarsis Lanús, former owner of the land.
- Laplacette, named after one of the founders of the village, Enrique Laplacette.
- Lartigau
- Longchamps, named after the Longchamp Racecourse in Paris.
- Manuel B. Gonnet, named after Manuel Bernardo Gonnet, first Minister of Public Works of the Province of Buenos Aires.
- Pasteur
- Pontaut
- Pueblo Gouin
- Ringuelet
- San Francisco de Bellocq
- Sevigné
- Solanet
- Sourigues
- Udaquiola
- Villa Alfredo Fortabat
- Villa Bordeu
- Villa Durcudoy (Diecisiete de Agosto)
- Villa Fournier
- Villa Francia
- Villa Saboya, colony founded by Manuel Cadret, an immigrant from Savoy.
- Villa Sauze

Bigand, Santa Fé.

=== Córdoba Province ===
- Buchardo
- Charbonier
- Colonia Maunier
- Colonia Vignaud
- Dumesnil
- Laborde
- Laboulaye
- La Francia
- Noetinger

=== Corrientes Province ===
- Bonpland

=== Entre Ríos Province ===
- Larroque
- Pueblo Bellocq
- Pueblo Cazes

=== La Pampa Province ===
- Bernardo Larroudé
- Eduardo Castex
- Gobernador Duval
- Maisonnave

=== Misiones Province ===
- Bonpland
- Hipólito Yrigoyen
- Santiago de Liniers

=== Santa Cruz Province ===
- Julia Dufour
- Tellier

=== Santa Fe Province ===
- Bigand
- Bouquet
- Chapuy
- Chovet
- Labordeboy

=== Tucumán Province ===
French immigration in Tucuman - family surnames

- Nougues
- Rougues
- Hileret
- Guerineau
- Fagalde
- Marteau
- Dupuy
- Dubois
- Etchecopar
- Durrels
- Delgare Etcheverry
- Chamboud
- Delacroix
- Apestey
- Merchot
- Deviller
- Haurigot
- Dubourg
- Ardois
- Moulins
- Revol
- Bascary
- Berho
- Bertrés
- Bugeau
- Cartier
- Jambeau
- Clesi
- Duport
- Heguy
- Delaport
- Lorentz

== Figures ==
Yearly French immigration to Argentina from 1857 to 1897
Year	French immigrants	Total immigrants	% French immigrants
1857	276	4,951	5.6%
1858	193	4,658	4.1%
1859	251	4,735	5.3%
1860	385	5,656	6.8%
1861	148	6,301	2.3%
1862	203	6,716	3%
1863	397	10,408	3.8%
1864	426	11,682	3.6%
1865	513	11,797	4.3%
1866	609	13,696	4.4%
1867	991	13,225	7.5%
1868	1,223	25,919	4.7%
1869	1,465	28,958	5%
1870	2,396	30,898	7.7%
1871	1,988	14,621	13.6%
1872	4,602	26,208	17.6%
1873	7,431	48,382	15.4%
1874	5,654	40,674	13.9%
1875	2,633	18,532	14.2%
1876	2,064	14,532	14.2%
1877	1,996	14,675	13.6%
1878	2,025	23,624	8.6%
1879	2,149	32,717	6.6%
1880	2,175	26,643	8.2%
1881	3,612	31,431	11.5%
1882	3,382	41,041	8.3%
1883	4,286	52,472	8.2%
1884	4,731	49,623	9.5%
1885	4,752	80,618	5.9%
1886	4,662	65,655	7.1%
1887	7,036	98,898	7.1%
1888	17,105	130,271	13.1%
1889	27,173	218,744	12.4%
1890	17,104	77,815	22%
1891	2,915	28,266	10.3%
1892	2,115	39,973	5.3%
1893	2,612	52,067	5%
1894	7,107	54,720	13%
1895	2,448	61,226	4%
1896	3,486	102,673	3.4%
1897	2,835	72,978	3.9%
Total	154,554	1,698,654	9.1%

French immigrants to Argentina from 1857 to 1909
Year period	French immigrants	Total immigrants	% French immigrants
1857–1870	2,789	178,883	1.6%
1871–1890	126,560	1,107,201	11.4%
1891–1909	56,400	2,086,339	2.7%
Total	185,749	3,372,423	5.5%

French immigration to Argentina from 1857 to 1924
Entrances	Departures	Balance
226,894	120,258	106,623

French immigrants to Argentina from 1915 to 1953
Year period	French immigrants
1915–1920	9,800
1921–1930	13,000
1931–1935	5,200
1936–1939	7,800
1944–1948	2,700
1949–1953	3,300

French immigration to Argentina from 1857 to 1946
Entrances	Departures	Balance
239,503	133,966	105,537

French net migration to Argentina from 1857 to 1976
Year period	French immigrants
1857–1860	578
1861–1870	4,292
1871–1880	10,706
1881–1890	69,363
1891–1900	11,395
1901–1910	11,862
1911–1920	-1,352
1921–1930	739
1931–1940	626
1941–1950	5,538
1951–1960	934
1961–1970	1,266
1971–1976	85
Total	116,032

== See also ==
- Argentina–France relations
- French diaspora
- Immigration to Argentina
- List of French Argentines
- Argentines in France
