= Nicolás Abot =

Argentine footballer

Personal information
- Full name: Nicolás Abot
- Date of birth: September 28, 1985 (age 41)
- Place of birth: La Colina, General La Madrid, Argentina
- Height: 1.83 m (6 ft 0 in)
- Position: Forward

Team information
- Current team: ASD Cotronei Caccuri

Youth career
- 1996–2001: General Lamadrid
- 2002: Deportivo Sarmiento
- 2003: Independ. Pueblo San José
- 2003: Barracas de Lamadrid
- 2004–2007: Olimpo

Senior career*
Years	Team	Apps	(Gls)
2006–2007	Olimpo	0	(0)
2007	Pérez Zeledón		
2008	Deportivo Azogues	0	(0)
2008	Deportivo Italiano	8	(0)
2008–2009	Sporting Punta Alta	22	(10)
2009–2010	Zamora	14	(1)
2010	Costa Cálida		
2011	Rampla Juniors	5	(0)
2011	Real Tolve		
2012	Pacífico de Cabildo		
2012	Deportivo Laferrere	1	(0)
2012	Ferro Carril Sud	8	(0)
2012–2013	Blooming	8	(0)
2013–2014	FC Jūrmala	12	(3)
2014–2015	Bhayangkara Presisi Lampung F.C.	10	(2)
2015	Salento Leverano		
2016	Cooma FC	18	(10)
2016	Tasman United	12	(1)
2017	Cooma FC	18	(15)
2017	Victoria Wanderers		
2017	Atletico Tricase		
2018	Polisportiva Monte Cimine		
2018	Pascoe Vale FC		
2018	Alassio FC		
2019	Cooma FC	10	(12)
2019	Krabi	12	(8)
2020	Roccasecca		
2020	Opountios Martinou		
2021	Panarkadikos		
2021	Cooma Tigers FC	12	(5)
2021–2022	Gungahlin United	22	(6)
2022–	Queanbeyan City	63	(56)
- * Club domestic league appearances and goals as of 19 September 2025

Nicolás Abot (born September 28, 1985, in Mar del Plata, Argentina) is an Argentine footballer.

== Career ==
Nicolás Abot joined the Latvian Higher League club FC Jūrmala in July 2014. Under the management of former Manchester United player Andrei Kanchelskis he played 10 league matches and scored 3 goals. He joined Persebaya DU/Bhayangkara F.C. on December 9, 2014.

In 2017, Abot hat spells with Maltese club Victoria Wanderers and Italian Promozione club Atletico Tricase.
