= Lamadrid (disambiguation) =

Lamadrid is a town in the northern Mexican state of Coahuila.

Lamadrid may also refer to:

- Gregorio Aráoz de Lamadrid (1795–1857), Argentine military and political leader
- General La Madrid, a town in Buenos Aires Province
- General La Madrid Partido, a partido in the central region of Buenos Aires Province
- Club Atlético General Lamadrid, a football club
- María Magdalena "Pocha" Lamadrid (1945–2021), Afro-Argentine activist
