= Bellocq (surname) =

Bellocq is a French surname. Notable people with the surname include:

- Adolfo Bellocq (1899–1972), influential Argentine artist known for his lithographs
- E. J. Bellocq (1873–1949), American professional photographer
- Éric Bellocq (born 1962), French lutenist
- Franco Bellocq (born 1993), Argentine professional footballer
- Gabrielle Bellocq (1920–1999), French Neo-impressionist pastel artist
- Henri Bellocq (1884–1959), French footballer
- Louise Bellocq (1919–1999), 20th-century French woman of letters
- Pierre Bellocq (1926–2026), French-American artist and horse racing cartoonist

== See also ==
- Pueblo Bellocq, a village and municipality in Entre Ríos Province in north-eastern Argentina
