= Bonpland (disambiguation) =

Aimé Bonpland was a French explorer and botanist.

Bonpland may also refer to:

- Pico Bonpland, Venezuela's third highest peak
- Bonpland (crater), a lunar crater
- Lake Bonpland
- Bonpland willow
- Bonpland, Corrientes, a small town and municipality in Argentina
- Mount Bonpland, a mountain in New Zealand
