= General La Madrid Partido =

General La Madrid Partido de General La Madrid
- Department
- location of General La Madrid Partido in Buenos Aires Province
- Coordinates: 37°15′S 61°15′W
- Country: Argentina
- Established: February 14 1890
- Founder: provincial law
- Seat: General La Madrid

Government
  - Intendant: Martín Randazzo (UCR)

Area
  - Total: 4,811 km^{2} (1,858 sq mi)

Population
  - Total: 10,984
  - Density: 2.283/km^{2} (5.913/sq mi)
- Demonym: lamadritense
- Postal Code: B7406
- IFAM: BUE048
- Area Code: 02286
- Website: www.lamadrid.gba.gov.ar

General La Madrid is a partido in the central region of Buenos Aires Province in Argentina.

The provincial subdivision has a population of about 11,000 inhabitants in an area of 4,811 km^{2} (1,858 sq mi), and its capital city is General La Madrid.

The Partido and its capital city are named after General Gregorio Aráoz de Lamadrid, a general who fought in the Argentine War of Independence. He served with Argentine heroes such as José de San Martín, Manuel Belgrano and José María Paz.

== Towns ==
- General La Madrid
- La Colina
- Líbano
- Las Martinetas
- Pontaut
