= Pontaut =

Coordinates: 37°44′S 61°20′W

Pontaut is a town located in the General Lamadrid Partido in the central region of Buenos Aires Province in Argentina, 57 km south from the administrative seat, General La Madrid. According to the 2010 census, the population was 68 inhabitants, a 24.4 percent drop from the 2001 level of 90 inhabitants. The city of Coronel Pringles is located 35 km directly to the south.
