= Líbano, Argentina =

Coordinates: 37°31′S 61°18′W

Líbano is a town located 34 km south from the city of General Lamadrid in Buenos Aires Province. Its name comes from its founding family, Libano Elorrieta.
