= Paso de los Libres Department =

Paso de los Libres Department Departamento Paso de los Libres (Spanish) Tetãvore Paso de los Libres (Guarani)
- Department
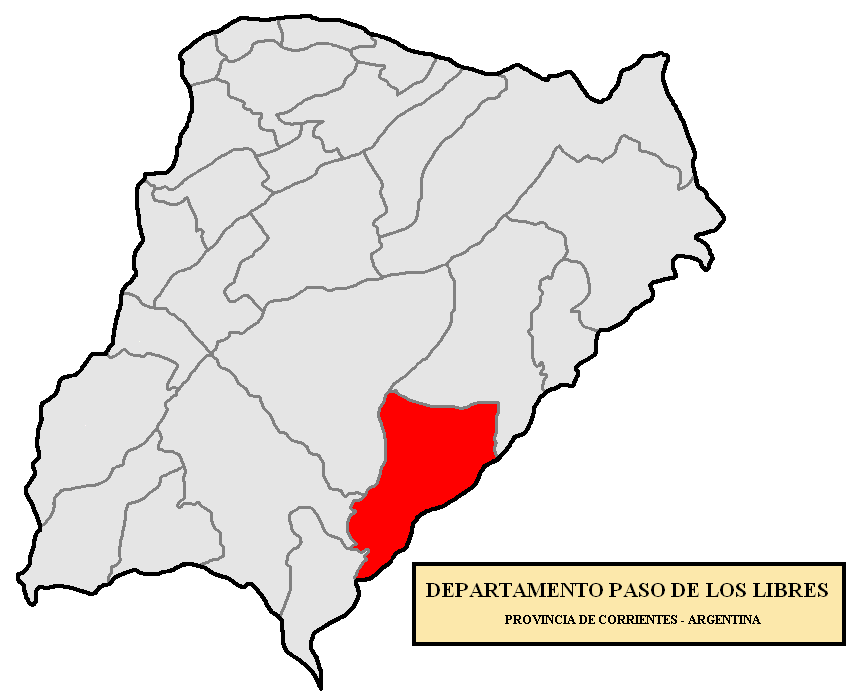
- location of Paso de los Libres Department in Corrientes Province
- Coordinates: 29°43′S 57°04′W
- Country: Argentina
- Seat: Paso de los Libres

Area
  - Total: 4,700 km^{2} (1,800 sq mi)

Population (2001 census [INDEC])
  - Total: 46,329
  - Density: 9.9/km^{2} (26/sq mi)
- Demonym: libreño/a
- Postal Code: W3320
- Area Code: 03772

Paso de los Libres Department is a department of Corrientes Province in Argentina.

The provincial subdivision has a population of about 46,329 inhabitants in an area of 4,700 km^{2} (1,800 sq mi), and its capital city is Paso de los Libres, which is located around 715 km (444 mi) from Capital Federal.

== Settlements ==
- Bonpland
- Parada Pucheta
- Paso de los Libres
- Tapebicuá
