= Santiago de Liniers, Misiones =

Santiago de Liniers (Misiones)
- Municipality and village
- Location within Misiones Province Location within Argentina
- Country: Argentina
- Province: Misiones Province

Government
  - Intendant: Miguel Ángel Szumkoski
- Time zone: UTC−3 (ART)

Santiago de Liniers (Misiones) is a village and municipality in Misiones Province in north-eastern Argentina.
