= Gabrielle Bellocq =

French pastel artist

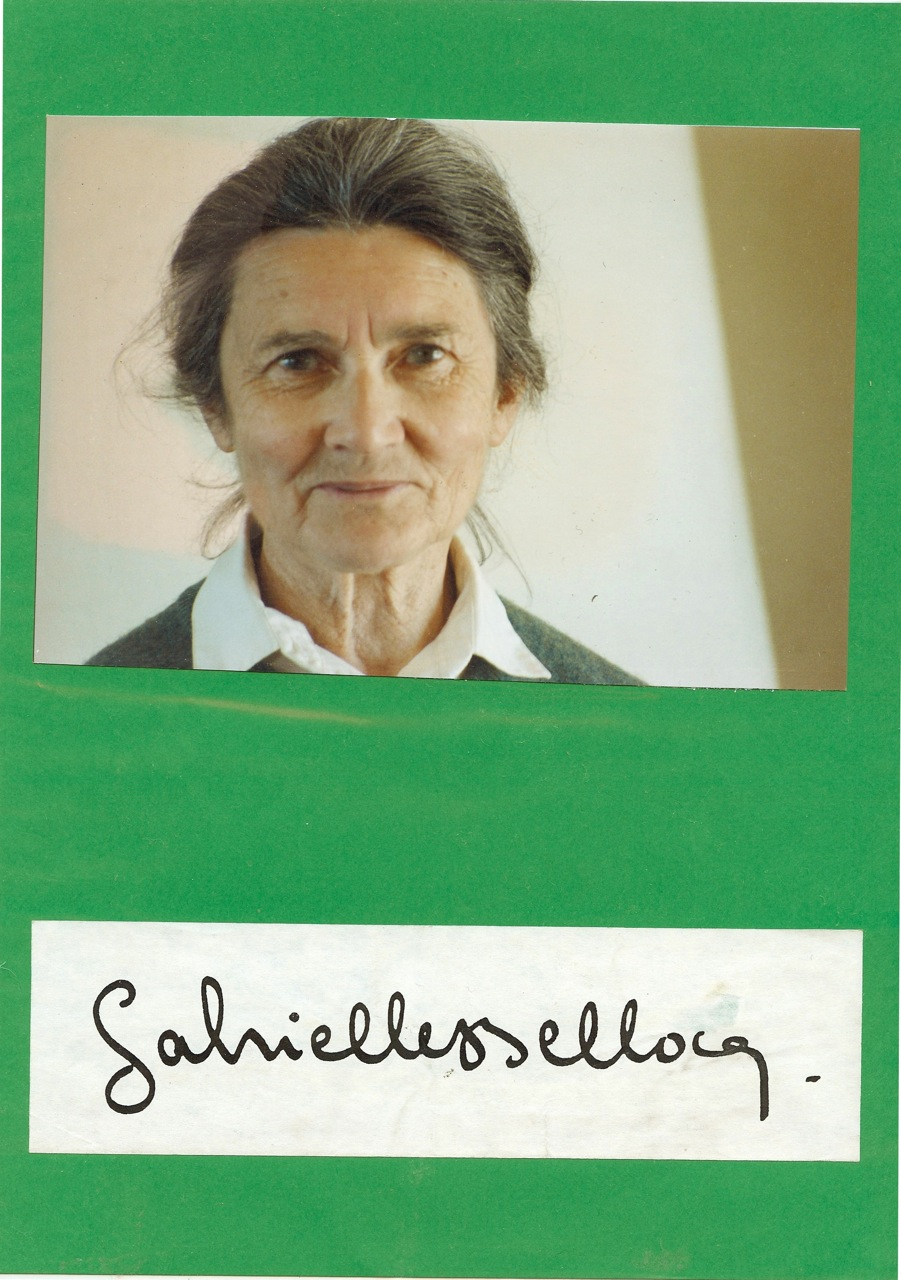
- Photo and signature of Gabrielle Bellocq (1997)
- Born: 15 June 1920; Saint-Hilaire-de-Talmont, France
- Died: 29 July 1999 (aged 79); Saint-Malo, France
- Movement: Neo-Impressionism

Gabrielle Bellocq (15 June 1920 – 29 July 1999) was a French Neo-impressionist pastel artist. She was known as a colorist, and her style of work, (which were not painted from life), included a variety of colors that have been said to produce an unusual perspective and impressionistic effects.

== Biography ==
Bellocq was born in 1920 in Saint-Hillaire-de-Talmont, a seaside commune in the Vendée department in the Pays de la Loire region in western France.

In the 1960s, she abandoned watercolours and guache to concentrate solely on using pastels, which she would dedicate herself to for more than 30 years.

She exhibited worldwide, including in Paris, France; Windsor, Henley-on-Thames, and Salisbury, England; Osaka, Japan; Chicago, Illinois; Sedona, Arizona; and Ede, Netherlands.

She died in the summer of 1999 and rests in Saint-Briac-sur-Mer, France.

== Awards ==
Bellocq has been acknowledged by various European artistic institutions, including Salon des Artistes Francais, Salon d'Automne, and the Royal Academy of Arts. In 1978, the purchase by the French Ministry of Culture of her painting Ouverture sur l'océan (Opening onto the Ocean) for the National Collection confirmed Bellocq's stature as a prominent artist. Some of her significant awards include:

- 1977: Honourable Mention at the Salon des Artistes Français
- 1978: Prix Blanche Roullier
- 1979: Prix Marie Bashkirtseff, Prix Atrux-Beauclair de la Fondation Baron Taylor, Prix Blanche Roullier
- 1980: Médaille d'Argent du Salon des Artistes français, Prix Blanche Roullier
- 1981: Prix Raybaud
- 1983: Prix Blanche Roullier
- 1984: Médaille d'Or du Salon des Artistes français
- 1987: Grand Prix de la ville de Dinard
