= Villa Nougués =

Coordinates: 26°51′28″S 65°22′32″W

- Settlement
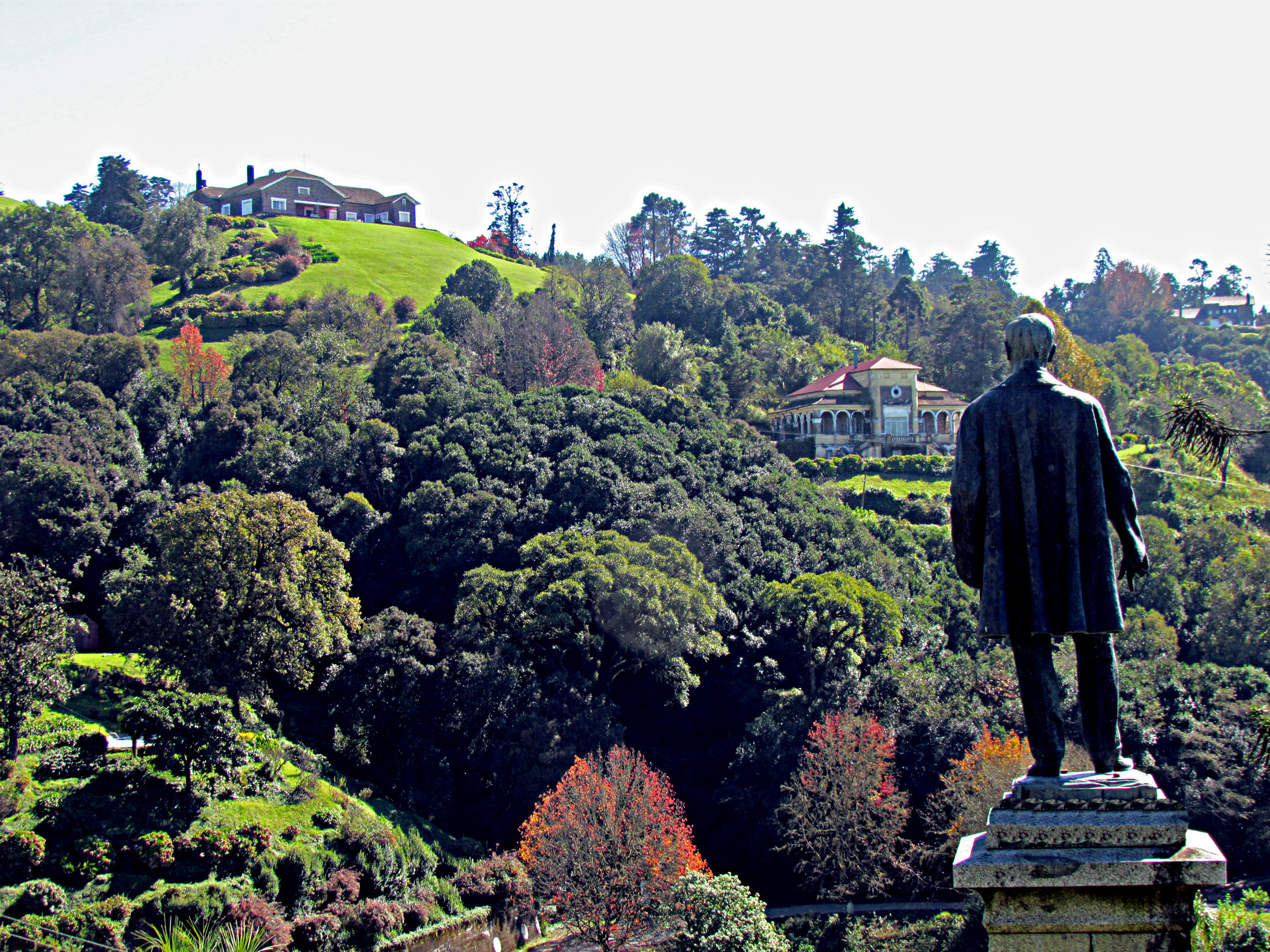
- Interactive map of Villa Nougués
- Country: Argentina
- Province: Tucumán
- Department: Lules

Government
  - Mayor: Daniel Castro (Front for Victory)

Population
  - Total: 10,785
- Time zone: UTC−3 (ART)
- CPA base: T4105
- Dialing code: +54 0381

Villa Nougués is a settlement in Lules Department, Tucumán Province, in northern Argentina.

== Overview ==
Situated along the eastern face of San Javier Hill, at 1,350 m (4,450 ft), the settlement was established where a Jesuit reduction operated until the order's suppression in 1767. Prominent Tucumán landowner Luis Francisco Nougués chose the site as the location of his summer house in 1899, and his brothers, Juan Calos and Alberto, followed suit, as did University of Tucumán founder Luis Francisco Nougués. These initial proprietors then resolved to create a community for administrative employees of Nougués' important San Pablo sugar plantation and mill, and founded the town in 1904; Luis Nougués served as Governor of Tucumán from 1906 to 1909.

The town's early structures were designed by Polish Argentine architect Juan Hlawascek in the Norman style favored by the Nougués family, originally from the French region of Haute-Garonne, and among the most noteworthy of these is the Villa Nougués Inn, built in 1903, the Hotel Club Sol, and the neogothic chapel, completed in 1918 (which hosts regular weddings for couples across Argentina). Local sights also include the numerous gardens, the Virgen de Lourdes grotto, a suspension bridge, and sculptor Juan Carlos Iramain's Cristo Redentor ("Christ the Redeemer"); the local Las Hortensias Golf Club is the highest in altitude in Argentina. The surrounding Yungas forest landscape, populated with junipers, gladiolus, hydrangea, and violets, and the location's proximity to San Miguel de Tucumán made the town desirable to both prospective homeowners, as well as tourism, in later decades.

== Climate ==
Owing to a higher altitude, Villa Nougués has a subtropical highland climate (Köppen climate classification: Cwb) with mild, rainy summers and cool, dry winters.

Climate data for Villa Nougués (1941–1950)
Month	Jan	Feb	Mar	Apr	May	Jun	Jul	Aug	Sep	Oct	Nov	Dec	Year
Record high °C (°F)	33.4 (92.1)	32.0 (89.6)	29.3 (84.7)	30.3 (86.5)	29.9 (85.8)	31.3 (88.3)	32.5 (90.5)	34.5 (94.1)	33.0 (91.4)	32.9 (91.2)	32.2 (90.0)	34.7 (94.5)	34.7 (94.5)
Mean daily maximum °C (°F)	24.2 (75.6)	22.9 (73.2)	20.5 (68.9)	18.5 (65.3)	16.0 (60.8)	14.1 (57.4)	14.4 (57.9)	16.6 (61.9)	18.5 (65.3)	20.8 (69.4)	22.5 (72.5)	24.3 (75.7)	19.4 (66.9)
Daily mean °C (°F)	19.1 (66.4)	18.2 (64.8)	16.1 (61.0)	14.0 (57.2)	11.3 (52.3)	9.2 (48.6)	8.9 (48.0)	10.8 (51.4)	12.7 (54.9)	14.8 (58.6)	16.7 (62.1)	19.1 (66.4)	14.2 (57.6)
Mean daily minimum °C (°F)	16.3 (61.3)	15.5 (59.9)	13.7 (56.7)	11.6 (52.9)	8.9 (48.0)	6.4 (43.5)	5.6 (42.1)	7.0 (44.6)	9.5 (49.1)	11.8 (53.2)	13.6 (56.5)	15.9 (60.6)	11.3 (52.3)
Record low °C (°F)	7.8 (46.0)	6.5 (43.7)	5.0 (41.0)	2.1 (35.8)	−4.5 (23.9)	−2.8 (27.0)	−4.2 (24.4)	−4.0 (24.8)	−2.0 (28.4)	1.8 (35.2)	4.6 (40.3)	7.4 (45.3)	−4.5 (23.9)
Average precipitation mm (inches)	253 (10.0)	209 (8.2)	223 (8.8)	110 (4.3)	60 (2.4)	30 (1.2)	16 (0.6)	17 (0.7)	35 (1.4)	108 (4.3)	155 (6.1)	148 (5.8)	1,364 (53.7)
Source: Sistema de Clasificación Bioclimática Mundial
