= La Colina =

- Town
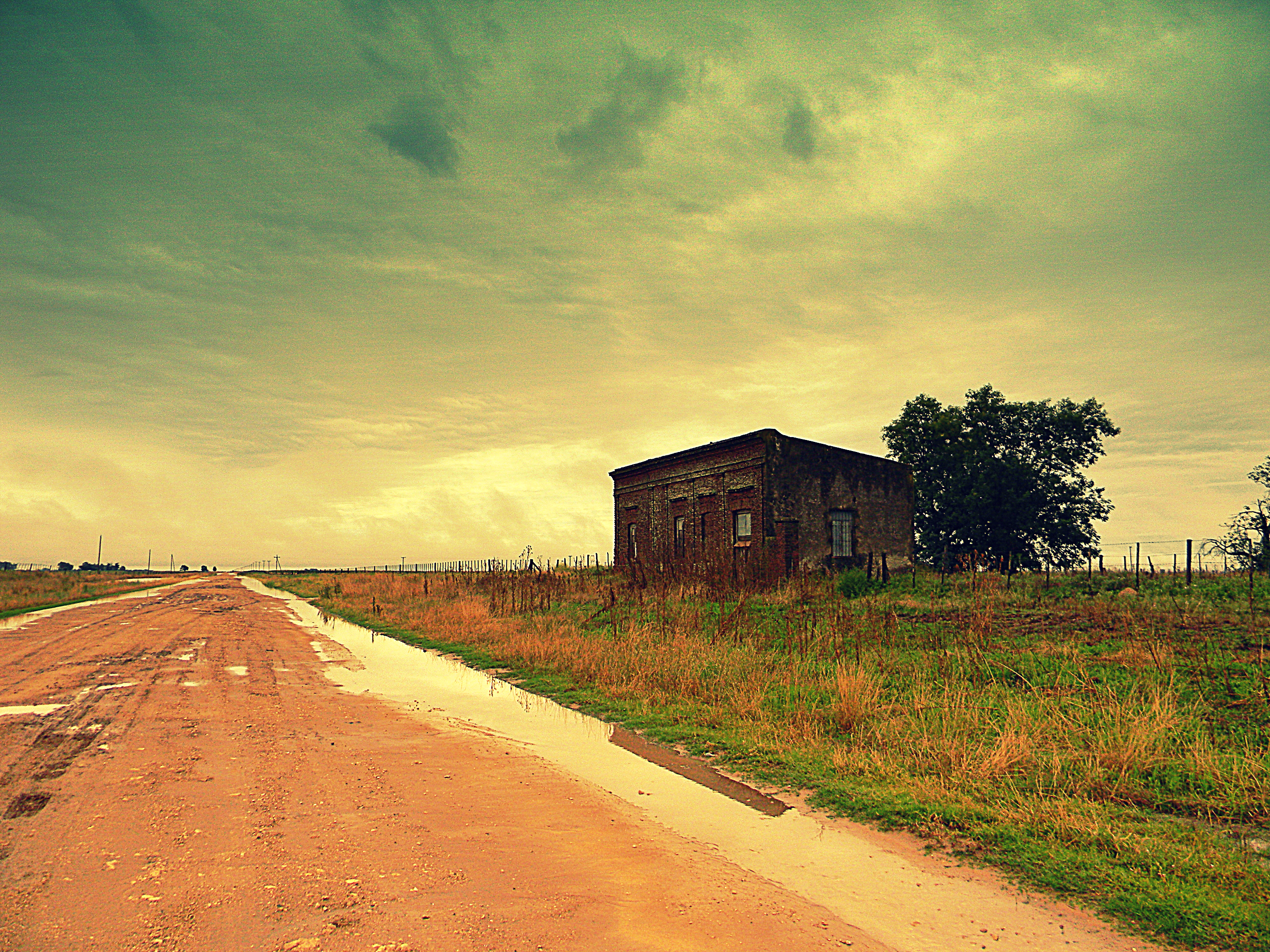

- Location within Buenos Aires Province
- Coordinates: 37°21′41″S 61°32′05″W
- Country: Argentina
- Province: Buenos Aires
- Partidos: General La Madrid
- Elevation: 199 m (653 ft)

Population (2001 Census)
  - Total: 713
- Time zone: UTC−3 (ART)
- CPA Base: B 7408
- Climate: Dfc

La Colina is a town located in the General La Madrid Partido in the province of Buenos Aires, Argentina.

== History ==
La Colina was formerly the location of the terminus of a train line, which was extended past the town in 1884. Rail service ended in 2015.

== Population ==
According to INDEC, which collects population data for the country, the town had a population of 713 people as of the 2001 census.
