= Gobernador Duval =

Coordinates: 38°43′S 66°24′W

- Rural locality and village
- Interactive map of Gobernador Duval
- Country: Argentina
- Province: La Pampa Province
- Time zone: UTC−3 (ART)

Gobernador Duval is a village and rural locality (municipality) in La Pampa Province in Argentina.
