= Maisonnave =

Coordinates: 35°02′S 64°23′W

- Rural locality and village
- Interactive map of Maisonnave
- Country: Argentina
- Province: La Pampa Province
- Elevation: 571 ft (174 m)

Population (2010)
  - Total: 300
- Time zone: UTC−3 (ART)
- Postal code: 6212

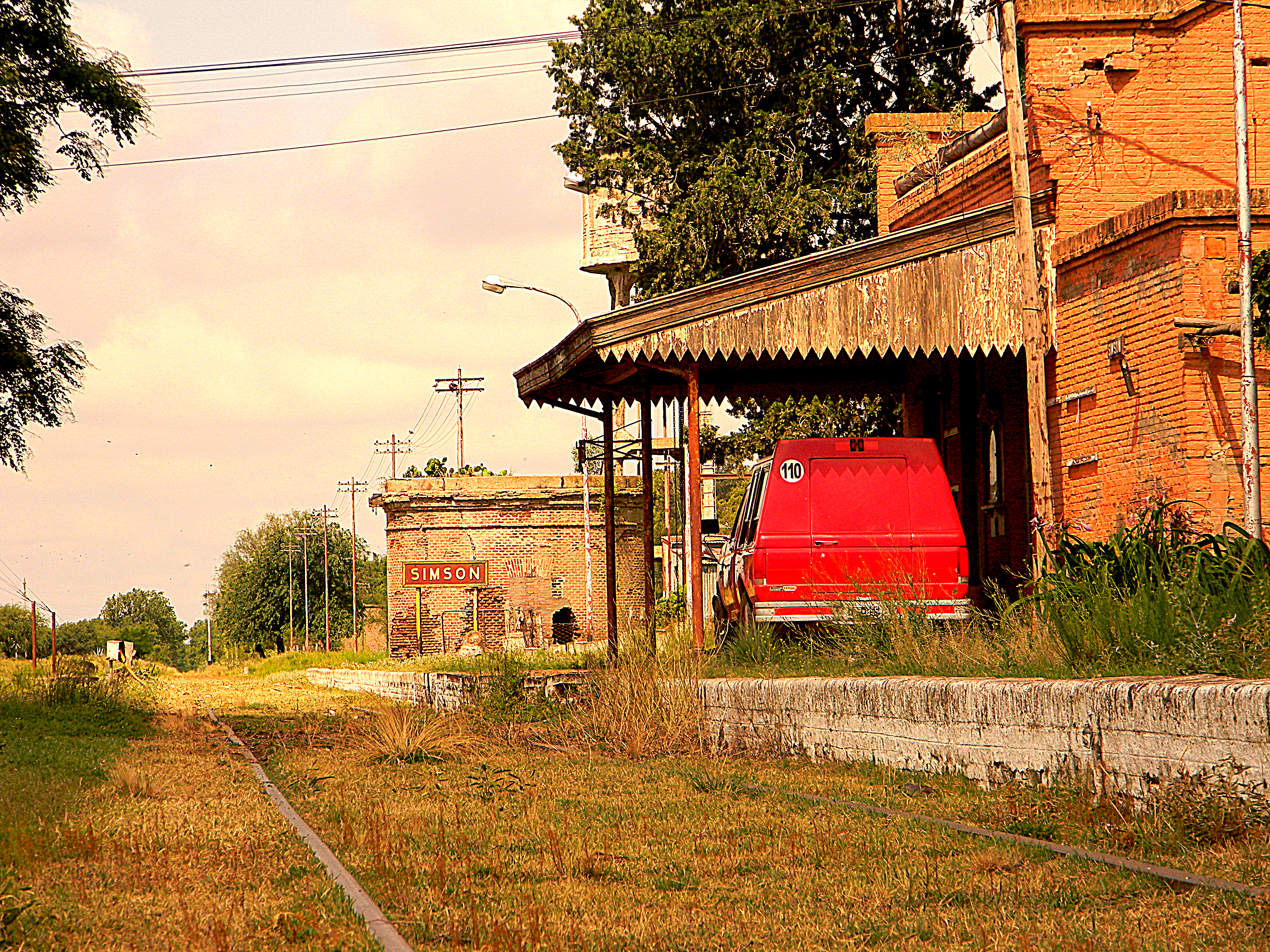
Estación Simson

Maisonnave is a village and rural locality (municipality) in La Pampa Province in Argentina. It is 186 km from the provincial capital Santa Rosa and 600 km from Buenos Aires; it can be accessed by the National Road RN 188. It was officially inaugurated on 9 July 1906.
