= Bonpland, Corrientes =

Bonpland
- Municipality and town
- Location of Bonpland in Argentina
- Coordinates: 29°49′3″S 57°25′40″W
- Country: Argentina
- Province: Corrientes
- Department: Paso de los Libres

Population (2001)
  - Total: 1,063
- Time zone: UTC−3 (ART)

Bonpland is a small town and municipality in Paso de los Libres Department, Corrientes Province, Argentina. According to the 2001 population census conducted by INDEC its population was 1063 inhabitants. It lies on National Route 14, about 11 kilometres from the right bank of the Uruguay River.

It was originally called Santa Ana, but on May 10, 1858, was renamed in honor of the French naturalist Aimé Bonpland whose body rests in a mausoleum in the Cemetery of the Holy Cross of Paso de los Libres. Its main economic activity is livestock and forestry, and rice farming. The town currently has an emergency hospital, an OFIN registrar, a secondary school, a primary school and one police station.
