= Pueblo Bellocq =

Coordinates: 31°25′39″S 59°44′40″W

- Municipality and village
- Interactive map of Pueblo Bellocq
- Country: Argentina
- Province: Entre Ríos Province
- Time zone: UTC−3 (ART)

Pueblo Bellocq is a village and municipality in Entre Ríos Province in north-eastern Argentina.
