= General La Madrid =

- Location in Argentina
- Coordinates: 37°15′S 61°15′W
- Country: Argentina
- Province: Buenos Aires
- Partido: General La Madrid
- Founded: February 14, 1890

Population (2001 census [INDEC])
  - Total: 7,923
- CPA Base: B 7406
- Area code: +54 2286

General La Madrid is a town in Buenos Aires Province, Argentina. It is the administrative seat of General La Madrid Partido.

The settlement was founded on February 14, 1890, by provincial law. Before that time, it was a small trading center known as Centro La Gama, located next to a railroad line (Ferrocarril Roca Sud) since 1883.

It has a summer resort named Balneario Eduardo Baraboglia located on the shores of the Arroyo Salado, 3 km away from the city.
