= José Joaquín Salazar Franco =

Venezuelan historian and writer

- Born: July 27, 1926; Tacarigua, Nueva Esparta, Venezuela
- Died: September 30, 2000; La Asunción, Nueva Esparta, Venezuela
- Other name: Cheguaco
- Citizenship: Venezuelan Venezuela
- Occupations: Historian, writer, folklorist, trade union leader
- Known for: Documenting the history and folklore of Margarita Island
- Awards: Illustrious Son of Gómez Municipality (1988)

José Joaquín Salazar Franco (27 July 1926 – 30 September 2000), widely known by hypocorism Cheguaco, was a Venezuelan historian, writer, folklorist, and official chronicler. Working without formal academic credentials, he produced over thirty published works documenting the history, oral traditions, and material culture of Margarita Island, in Nueva Esparta state. His output was recognized by Efraín Súbero, professor at Simón Bolívar University and one of Venezuela's foremost authorities on folklore, who classified Salazar Franco's contributions within both literary and material folklore. In 1987 he was appointed official chronicler of Tacarigua; the municipal library of Tacarigua was later named in his honour.

== Early life ==
José Joaquín Salazar Franco was born on 27 July 1926 in Tacarigua, a village in the Gómez Municipality, Nueva Esparta state, to Julián Salazar Lárez and Jerónima Franco de Salazar. His formal education did not extend beyond primary school. As a child he sold food in the streets of Tacarigua; as a young teenager he worked on the land. His first contact with journalism came through his primary-school teacher, José Jesús Salazar, who allowed him to write for the school paper Presagios at the age of thirteen. He later moved to La Asunción to complete his primary studies.

== Public service and archival research ==
Due to his abilities in writing and grammar, Salazar Franco held a series of public administrative posts, including Secretary of the Communal Board of Tacarigua, Secretary of the District Prefecture, and Administrative Clerk at the Main Office of the Public Registry of Nueva Esparta. These positions gave him access to historical records, archival documents, and ecclesiastical registers, which became the empirical foundation of his later historical research. He also served on the Committee for Cultural Development of Tacarigua.

== Career as chronicler and folklorist ==
Salazar Franco began writing for the regional press in the 1960s, contributing to the newspaper Marejada. His historical and folkloric research drew on two complementary methods: documentary inquiry in official and ecclesiastical archives, and systematic collection of oral testimony from communities across the island.

In 1971, the government of Nueva Esparta state published his first book, La Tacarigua de Margarita, a local history that distinguished his native village from eight other Venezuelan settlements sharing the same name. The work launched a sustained publishing career that would eventually span narrative fiction, poetry, history, and folklore.

In 1987 he was appointed official chronicler of Tacarigua, a formal civic role responsible for the preservation and transmission of the municipality's historical memory.

=== Scholarly recognition ===
Efraín Súbero (1931–2008), professor of language and literature at Simón Bolívar University in Caracas and widely regarded as one of the most distinguished Venezuelan intellectuals of the twentieth century, analysed and classified Salazar Franco's folklore output. Súbero placed his work within two categories: literary folklore (myths, legends, beliefs, songs, games, and customs) and material folklore (research on the island's artisanal traditions).

=== Role in the designation of Margarita's graphic chronicler ===
In 1993, Salazar Franco proposed the Czech-Venezuelan painter and draughtsman Carlos Stohr as the first graphic chronicler of Margarita Island. He taught Stohr the island's customs, traditions, and religious devotions, and presented his candidacy to the official chroniclers' association. Stohr was formally recognised by the Association of Official Chroniclers of Nueva Esparta in 1996 and sworn in at the 29th National Convention of Official Chroniclers of Venezuela in 1999.

=== Contribution to Venezuelan historiography ===
One of Salazar Franco's contributions to national history is his thesis on the role of indigenous people from Tacarigua in the expedition of Francisco Fajardo, the mestizo conquistador from Margarita credited with the first founding of Caracas.

== Social and labour activism ==
Before the age of twenty, Salazar Franco joined the Guevara Cultural Centre and the Federation of Workers of Nueva Esparta. He later moved to El Tigre, Anzoátegui state, where he became a trade union leader and attended two national workers' congresses.

== Legacy ==
On 12 April 1988, Salazar Franco and his former teacher José Jesús Salazar were jointly declared Illustrious Sons of Gómez Municipality.

Following his death, the municipal public library of Tacarigua was named the Biblioteca José Joaquín Salazar Franco in his honour. In 2022, the Association of Official Chroniclers of Nueva Esparta, the library, and the Casa de la Cultura of Tacarigua organised a tribute to mark the anniversary of his birth, at which several chroniclers spoke about his legacy.

His children established the Fundación José Joaquín Salazar Franco (Cheguaco), which continues to publish his works and those of other writers from Tacarigua and Margarita Island.

Sixteen manuscripts remained unpublished at the time of his death.

== Literary and investigative work ==
José Joaquín Salazar Franco's intellectual production is characterized by its focus on the preservation of local memory. His work is traditionally classified into four main branches: narrative, poetry, history, and folklore. During his lifetime, Salazar Franco published over thirty books, poems, and historical essays. His works are held in several academic and public libraries, including the University of Texas, which holds copies of titles such as Consejas y leyendas margariteñas (1989).

=== Narrative ===
His narrative work is divided into two branches. The first includes short stories set in rural environments that reflect the socioeconomic conditions of the island, immersed in an atmosphere marked by droughts, peasant poverty, and emigration. These are compiled in the volumes Brotes sobre la tierra ñera (1979) and Los terrazgos de Cheguaco (1981). The second branch corresponds to the so-called "cuentos de camino" (road tales) or "cachos", based on oral tradition, wake stories (cuentos de velorio), local anecdotes, and popular humor, compiled in Por los senderos de Margarita (2004).

=== Poetry ===
His poetic production maintains a theme very similar to his narrative. It follows a descriptive line linked to country life, the loss of loved ones, everyday anxieties, and the uneasiness in the face of modernity. Historian Domingo Carrasquero defined his poetry as "a realistic painting with a profound descriptive and emotional weight." His two published poetry collections are El Murmullo del Breñal (1996) and Un grito en la Hondonada (2000).

=== History and toponymy ===
As a researcher, Salazar Franco combined the review of official and ecclesiastical archives with the recording of oral tradition. His publications range from the local history of Tacarigua, its patron saints, and Neo-Spartan towns, to biographies of independence figures such as Juan Bautista Arismendi, Francisco Esteban Gómez, and Santiago Mariño. At the national level, he made original contributions, such as the thesis on the participation of Tacarigua natives in the first founding of Caracas by Francisco Fajardo, and biographical research on Diego Bautista Urbaneja Alayón, a native of Tacarigua who served as interim president of Venezuela in 1879. Notable titles include:

- La Tacarigua de Margarita (1971)
- Matasiete y la Libertad (1972)
- Rastrojeo de la historia margariteña
- La Asunción, ciudad procera (2000)
- General Santiago Mariño, en décimas populares
- Bolívar en el anecdotario popular margariteño
- La expedición de Los Cayos en el andar del tiempo
- El Corazón de Jesús de Tacarigua Afuera en sus cien años de patronato

=== Folklore and ethnography ===
This constitutes the most extensive and prolific branch of his intellectual work. According to researcher Efraín Subero, this area of his work can be grouped into "literary folklore" (myths, beliefs, folk tales, traditional songs, and games) and "material folklore" (studies on the primitive crafts of the island). Much of this material has been digitized for preservation:

- Mitos y creencias margariteñas (1982; 2nd ed. 1999, family edition, Tacarigua de Margarita)
- Leyendas y creencias margariteñas (1996, Fondo Editorial FONDENE, Tacarigua de Margarita; ISBN 980-360-005-2)
- Consejas y leyendas margariteñas (1989, author's edition, Tacarigua de Margarita; ISBN 980-300-805-6)
- Usos y costumbres tradicionales en Margarita
- Margarita y su artesanía primitiva
- La artesanía tradicional margariteña (1978)
- Macanao, el lugar de donde el viento se devuelve
- El gua, gua, gua de los guaicos (2002, Editorial Fundación Cheguaco, Tacarigua; ISBN 980-6491-41-6)

=== Unpublished manuscripts ===
According to literary reviews and records from the Cheguaco Foundation, at the time of his death in 2000, the author left a collection of unpublished manuscripts. These form part of the institution's Documentary Fund (Fondo Documental), awaiting editing and digitization.

== Death ==
Salazar Franco died on 30 September 2000 in La Asunción, on the feast day of Saint Jerome.

== Sources ==
- Malaver G., Emigdio (28 July 2022). "«Más pendejo tú que lees esos embustes»". El Sol de Margarita.
- "Falleció Carlos Stohr, cronista gráfico de Margarita". El Nacional. 25 December 2017.
- "José Joaquín Salazar Franco «Cheguaco» uno de los intelectuales más importantes de Margarita". Otilca Radio. 30 September 2022.
- "Reseña biográfica — José Joaquín Salazar Franco". Fundación José Joaquín Salazar Franco (Cheguaco).
- Paradas, Mirimarit (1996). "José Joaquín Salazar Franco "Cheguaco" Manos... que conocen de la tierra y la palabra" (PDF). Biblioteca Digital de Nueva Esparta.
- Hernández, Homero (2026-07-31). "Vertiente: José Joaquín Salazar Franco "Cheguaco". Manos que saben de la tierra y la palabra". La Hora Online.
- "El hombre que convirtió la memoria de Margarita en palabra viva". Otilca Radio.
- "Biografía de José Joaquín Salazar Franco, Cheguaco". Reseñas Literarias.
- Salazar Franco, José Joaquín (1989). Consejas y leyendas margariteñas.
