= Carlos Stohr =

Czech-born Venezuelan engineer, painter, writer, chronicler

- Karel Franšitek Stöhr Breuer
- Born: September 29, 1931; Prague, Czechoslovakia
- Died: December 24, 2017 (aged 86); Caracas, Venezuela
- Other name: Tacaricheco
- Occupations: Engineer, painter, writer, chronicler
- Spouse: Karen Fossing
- Children: 4 - Martin, Niels, Diana, Karina

Carlos Stohr Breuer (born Karel Franšitek Stöhr Breuer; Prague, 29 September 1931 – Caracas, 24 December 2017) was a Czech-Venezuelan engineer, painter, writer and the only graphic chronicler in the history of Venezuela. He was popularly known as El Tacaricheco, a portmanteau of tacarigüero (a person from Tacarigua) and checo (Czech), which he embraced proudly: "I am a tacarigüero born in Prague — a checo-tacarigüero."

== Biography ==
=== Early life ===
Stohr was born on 29 September 1931 in Prague to Franšitek Josef Stöhr and Maria Breuer. After World War II, the family emigrated to Venezuela in 1947 to escape war and communism, settling in El Trompillo, Carabobo State. He studied at the Don Bosco secondary school in Valencia and the Simón Bolívar secondary school in San Cristóbal, completing his studies in 1951. In 1959, he graduated as a surveying engineer (agrimensor) from the Central University of Venezuela, where he later taught. He worked on several urban development projects in Caracas, including the Ciudad Satélite La Trinidad residential complex.

=== Margarita and Tacarigua ===
In 1953, Stohr visited Margarita Island for the first time and fell in love with it. He returned repeatedly over the following decades and settled there permanently at the age of 75 (around 2006), devoting himself to documenting the history and culture of Nueva Esparta.

The village of Tacarigua held a special place in his life, which he described as "his other love." There he forged close friendships with chronicler José Joaquín Salazar Franco — known by his hypocoristic Cheguaco — for whom he produced 286 illustrations for six books on Margaritan customs and traditions, and with Pedro Rivero Navarro, with whom he worked at the National Agrarian Institute. His daughter Karina recalls that every visit to the island included an obligatory stop in Tacarigua.

=== Personal life ===
In 1958, Stohr married Karen Fossing, a Danish national. They had four children: Martin, Niels, Diana and Karina.

A man of wide-ranging talents, he spoke six languages and sang the traditional Venezuelan galerón in all of them. In his youth he was an accomplished diver and represented Venezuela at the 1955 Pan American Games in Mexico City, where he won a silver medal in springboard diving. He also played bridge in international tournaments, collected vintage automobiles — part of his collection was donated to the Caracas Transport Museum — and was an avid philatelist.

He died on 24 December 2017 in Caracas, aged 86.

== Artistic work ==
=== Painting and drawing ===
Over the course of his career, Stohr produced more than 5,200 paintings and drawings, held 31 solo and 3 permanent exhibitions, and participated in over 100 group shows. He worked primarily on paper using Indian ink, graphite, pen and ink, watercolour, sanguine and pastels, and occasionally oil. He signed traditional works as C. STOHR and abstract or modern works as C.S. PRAGA.

His principal subject was the landscape, everyday life, traditional crafts and the people of Margarita Island. His most significant series, Rastros y Rostros ("Traces and Faces"), comprises portraits of some 330 notable figures from the island, assembled over four decades.

In 1996, he designed the La Guaicora silver commemorative medal, honoring the indigenous name of Margarita Island.

=== Books ===
Year	Title	Notes
1989	El doble dos del checo	On domino pairs; 23 drawings
1991	Nuestras vivencias margariteñas	67 illustrations
1996	Margarita un solo rostro	Costumbrismo; 201 illustrations
1998	Los checos en Venezuela	20 illustrations
2001	El checo tras las huellas del costumbrismo margariteño	65 drawings
2004	En mis Bodas de Oro en Margarita	Chronicle
2005	Mi paso por la Trinidad	Chronicle
2014	Rastros y Rostros de Margarita	Iconography of ~330 Margaritan figures

He also produced 286 illustrations for six books by writer José Joaquín Salazar Franco ("Cheguaco") on Margaritan customs and folklore.

== Graphic Chronicler ==
It was José Joaquín Salazar Franco who first proposed Stohr as Graphic Chronicler of Margarita in 1993. The Association of Chroniclers of Nueva Esparta formally recognized him in 1996, and in 1999, at the 29th Convention of Official Chroniclers of Venezuela held in Mérida, he was sworn in as the only Graphic Chronicler in the country's history.

He was a member of the Association of Writers of Nueva Esparta, the Venezuelan Association of Plastic Artists — Nueva Esparta Section (AVAPNE), the Venezuelan Association of Watercolorists (AVA), the Circle of Draftsmen of Nueva Esparta (CIRDINE) and the Circle of Drawing of Caracas.

== Awards and recognition ==
- Graphic Chronicler of Margarita Island (1999) — the only one in Venezuela's history
- Adopted son of the municipalities of Gómez and Antolín del Campo, Nueva Esparta
- Living Cultural Heritage (Patrimonio Cultural Viviente, 2001)
- Regional Prize for Visual Arts, Drawing category (2003)
- Prize for Costumbrista Drawing (2006)
