= Santa Ana, Nueva Esparta =

Santa Ana
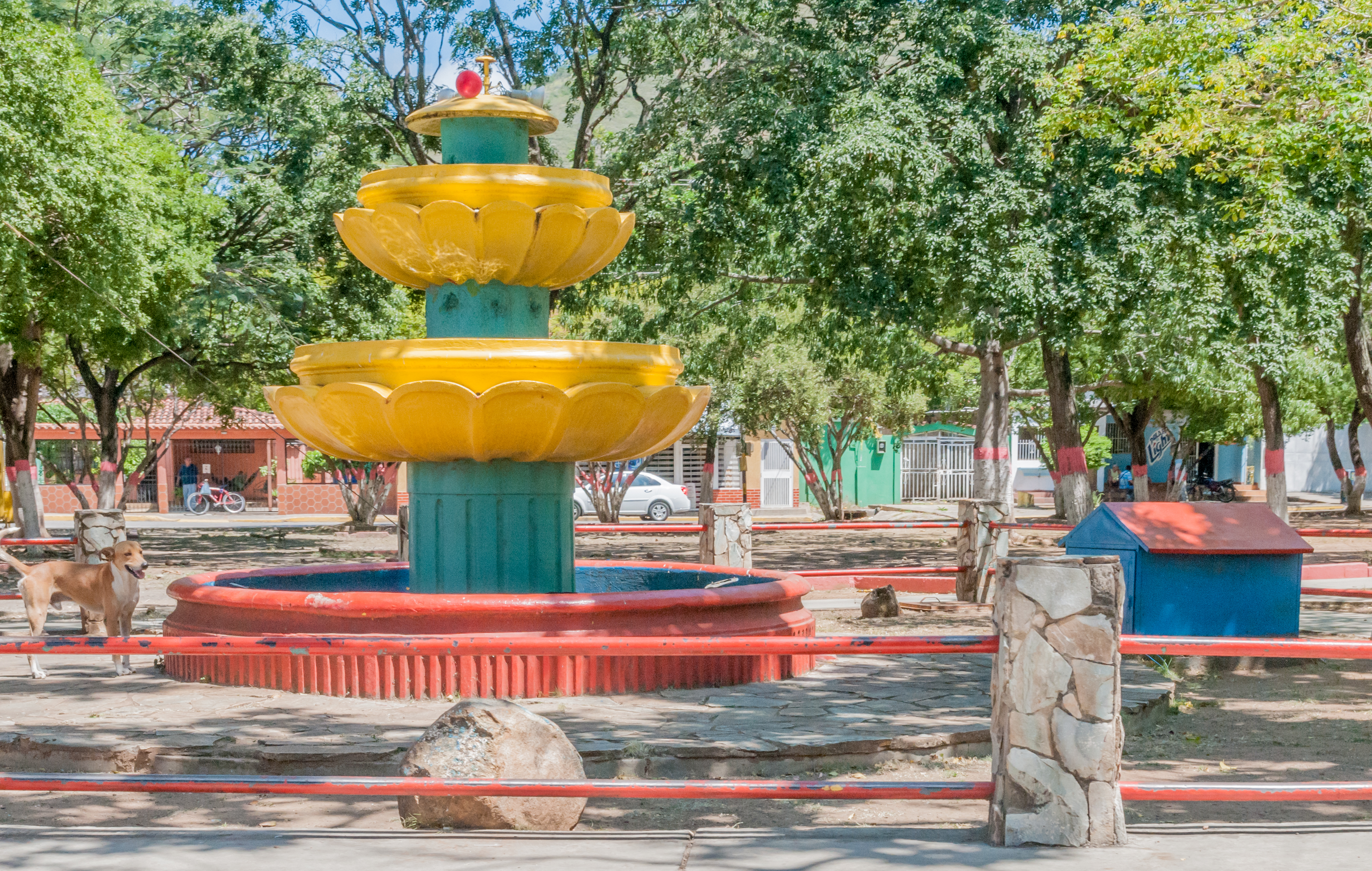

- Location within Venezuela
- Coordinates: 11.06796°N 63.922116°W
- Country: Venezuela
- State: Nueva Esparta
- Municipality: Gómez

Population
  - Total: 33,435
- Postal code: 6301
- Climate: BSh

Santa Ana is a town on Isla Margarita, in the state of Nueva Esparta, Venezuela. It is the capital of the Gómez municipality. The town is located in the south of the municipality, in the northeast of Margarita.

Santa Ana has an average temperature of 27 °C (81 °F). It serves as a bedroom community for other cities like La Asunción and Juan Griego. Santa Ana is one of the fourteen heritage cities of Venezuela. The town is known for its chinchorros, a form of hammock with an open weave named after a fishing net.

Santa Ana was founded by Captain Diego Vásquez Coronado around 1530 during the governorship of Aldonza Manrique. It was originally called La Villa del Norte. Construction of the church of Santa Ana started in 1749. Francisco Esteban Gómez, victor of the Battle of Matasiete in 1717, was born in Santa Ana on 26 December 1783, natural son of María Concepción Gómez. He was baptized in the church. Gomez's house is now a museum.

The church was the location of the Assembly of Notables that recognized Simón Bolívar as Supreme Chief after Bolívar had declared the Third Republic of Venezuela on 6 May 1816. The chair in which Bolivar sat is preserved in the church.

== Gallery ==
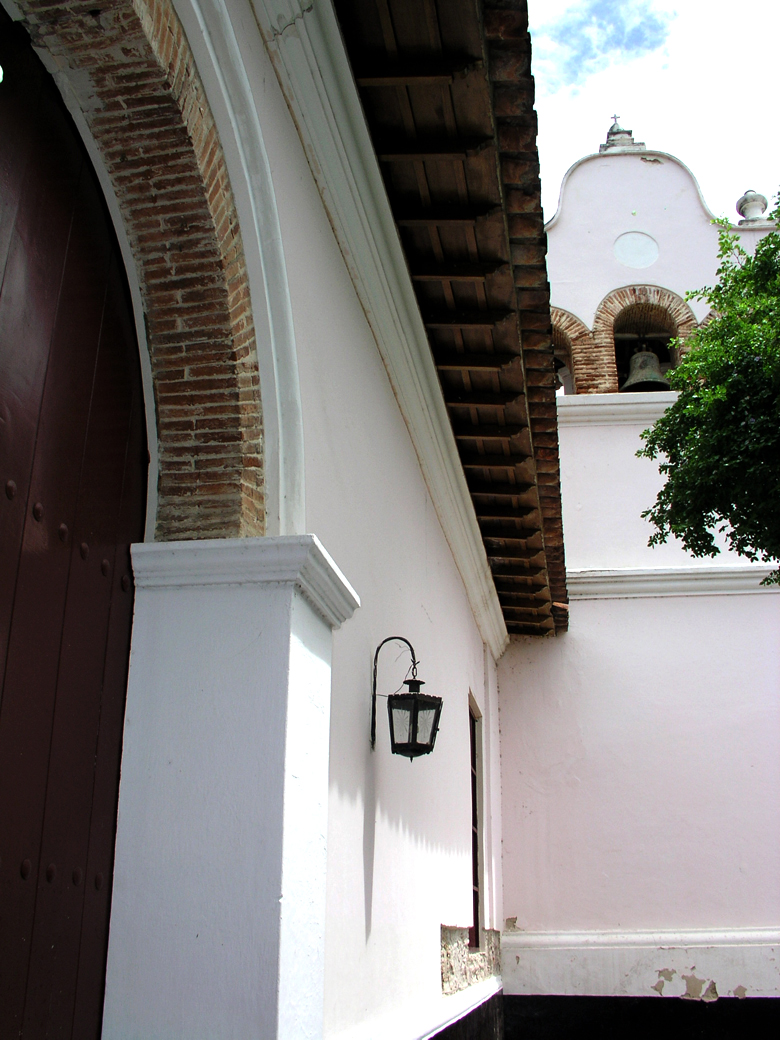
Santa Ana church

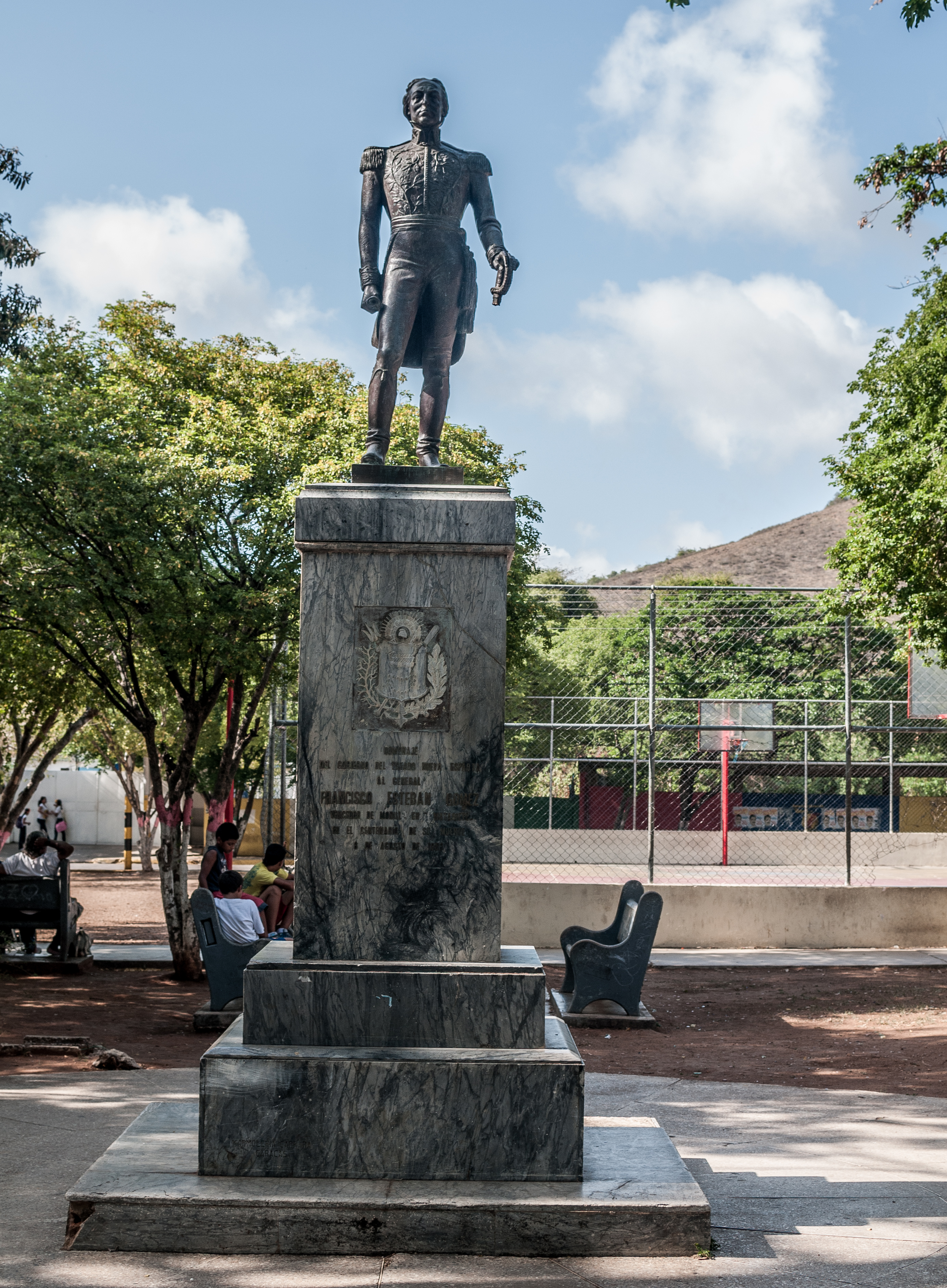
Statue of Francisco Esteban Gómez in Santa Ana
