= Francisco Esteban Gómez =

Venezuelan military personnel (1783–1853)

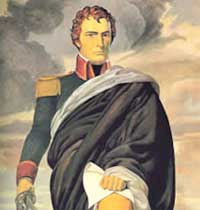
- Born: Francisco Esteban Gómez; December 26, 1783; Santa Ana, Margarita Island, Venezuela
- Died: August 6, 1853 (aged 69)
- Parent: Maria Concepcion Gomez

Francisco Esteban Gómez (Santa Ana, December 26, 1783 – La Asunción, August 6, 1853) was a Venezuelan military officer who was active in the Venezuelan War of Independence. Known as the “patriot commander” of Margarita Island, he was noted for his participation in the defense of the island against invading Spanish forces. In particular, he is honored today as the hero of the Battle of Matasiete (1817).

He started his career as a military officer and achieved the ranks of colonel, then general, major general of the army, and commanded the arms of the province of Cumaná. He represented Margarita at the Congress of Cucuta, and was Governor of Margarita Island (1817-1820).

== Early life ==
Gomez was born on December 26, 1783, in Villa Norte (Santa Ana) in the Province of Margarita to Maria Concepcion Gomez. He was baptized at the place of his birth by Father Garcia Migi Fco. He got married in the church of Santa Ana.

== Career ==
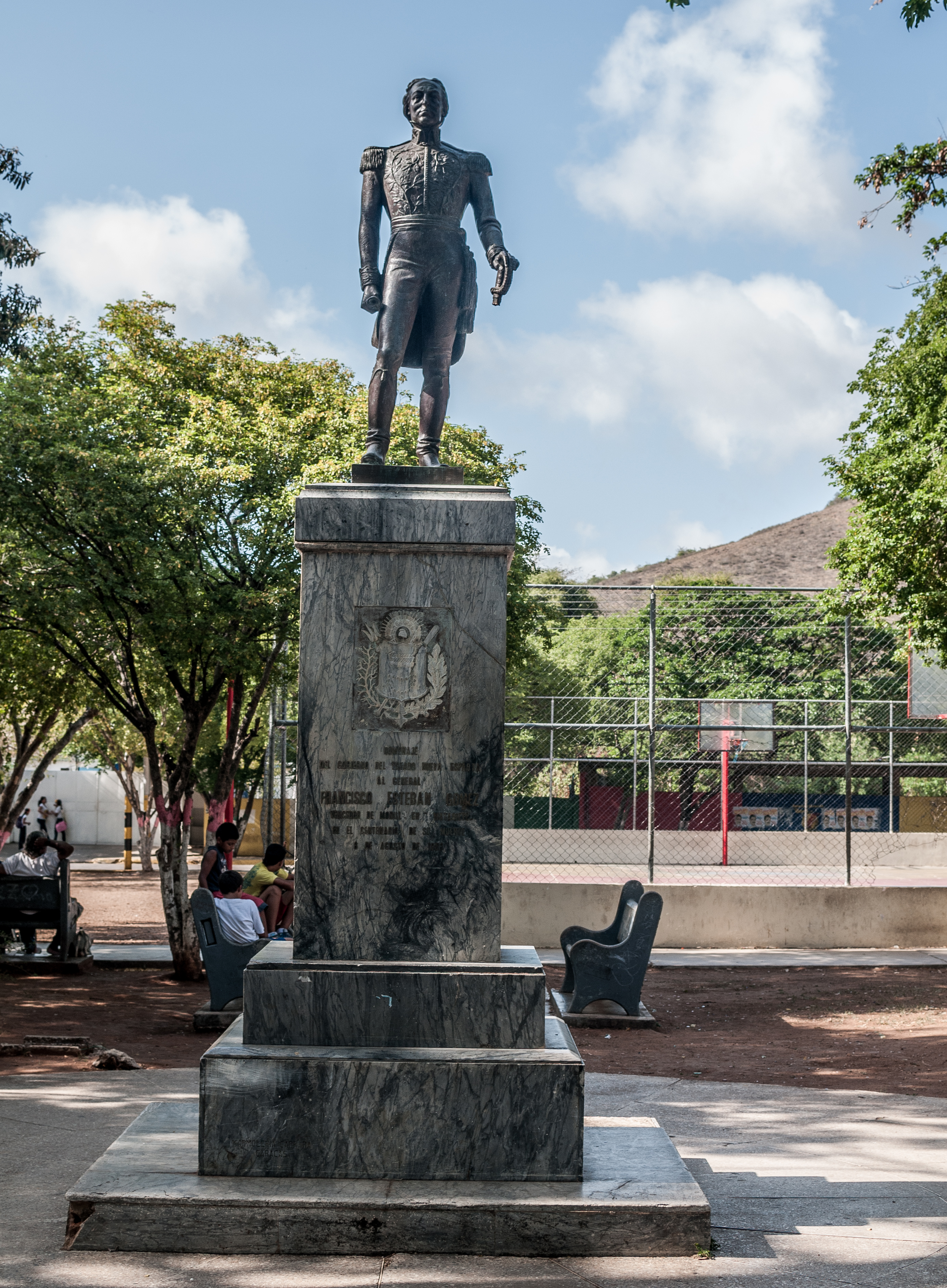
Statue in Santa Ana honoring Francisco Esteban Gomez.

Gomez joined the independence movement on May 4, 1810, and this participation invited his persecution by the government which resulted in his staying incognito on the island, in 1812. He accompanied General Juan Bautista Arismendi in the second insurrection of Margarita Island. This resulted in his arrest in 1815. He was associated with the peace treaty of April 15, 1815 and sided with Arismendi, on November 16, 1815, in the revolt.

On May 8, 1816, Simón Bolívar promoted him to colonel. During the July 31, 1817 Battle of Matasiete, he fought against General Pablo Morillo. He published the manifesto titled "Great Nations and Generous World" on June 23, 1817. On July 31, 1817, he was promoted as Brigadier General for the successful war campaign of the Battle of Matasiete.

In 1830, José Antonio Páez made Gomez commander-in weapons of Maracaibo. In 1835, the constitutional president of Venezuela, José María Vargas, entrusted Gomez with the Command of Arms of the province of Cumaná. In 1837, he served as Chief Operating Officer of Cumaná, Margarita and Barcelona. In 1847 he sought and obtained a certificate as an invalid, but he was reappointed Governor of Margarita in 1853. He died the same year in the building that was the Franciscan Convent of La Asunción

== Legacy ==
As directed by the President of Venezuela, on February 11, 1876, his mortal remains were transferred to a funerary urn in the Catedral Nuestra Señora de La Asunción. On July 18, 1880, the urn containing his mortal remains was shifted to Caracas. It was then interred in the National Pantheon of Venezuela on August 20, 1880.

Gómez Municipality, Nueva Esparta, birthplace of the victorious general, is named in his honor. The Plaza Francisco Esteban Gomez in Santa Ana honors him with his statue as the hero of the Battle of Matasiere, while his home, located close by, is conserved as a museum.
