= Gómez Municipality =

Gómez Municipality Municipio Gómez
- Municipality
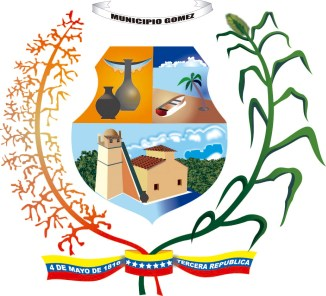
- Coat of arms

- Location in Nueva Esparta

- Location in Venezuela
- Coordinates: 11°05′00″N 63°56′00″W
- Country: Venezuela
- State: Nueva Esparta
- Municipal seat: Santa Ana

Area
  - Total: 88.7 km^{2} (34.2 sq mi)

Population (2001)
  - Total: 30,237
  - Density: 341/km^{2} (883/sq mi)
- Time zone: UTC−4 (VET)
- Postal code(s): 6301
- Website: Official website

Gómez is a municipality of Isla Margarita in the state of Nueva Esparta, Venezuela. The municipality is in the northeast of Margarita. The capital is Santa Ana. The county is divided into five parishes: Bolivar Guevara, Matasiete, Santa Ana and Sucre.

== Geography ==
The region in the east and south of the municipality is characterized by mountain ridges with forested valleys. The northern half is lower, flatter, and much warmer than the mountains. The average annual temperature is 27 °C (81 °F). Annual precipitation averages 896 millimetres (35.3 in).

== History ==
The pueblo del Norte (now Santa Ana) village was founded around 1530 under the governorship of Aldonza Manrique. Fortin España was built in the 17th century on the strategic hill of Santa Ana. The municipality is named after General Francisco Esteban Gómez. He was born in Santa Ana on 26 December 1783. He defeated General Pablo Morillo in the Battle of Matasiete on 31 July 1817. The capital, Santa Ana, is also known as Norte, Villa del Norte and Santa Ana del Norte. In the colonial period it was one of the most important towns on the island. Simón Bolívar was recognized as Supreme Head of the Republic of Venezuela in the Assembly of Notables held on 6 May 1816 in the church of Santa Ana.

== Economy ==
Tourism, handicrafts and fishing are the main economic activities of the municipality. The products of the main towns and villages are:

- Tacarigua: agriculture and handicraft production
- Santa Ana: Municipal capital. Hammocks
- La Vecindad: hammocks
- El Cercado: ceramics
- El Maco: typical shoes
- Altagracia: traditional espadrilles are made with seashells and ornaments
- Pedro González: mapires (hand baskets) made of palm
- Guayacán: Fishing village

== Gallery ==
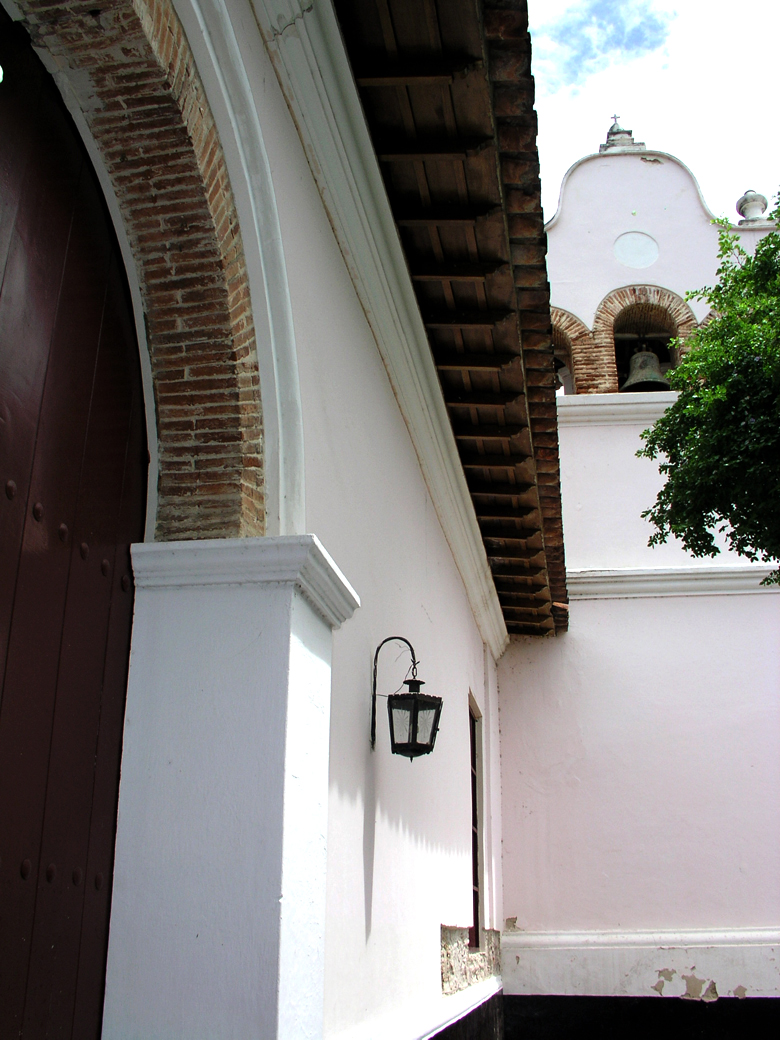
Santa Ana church

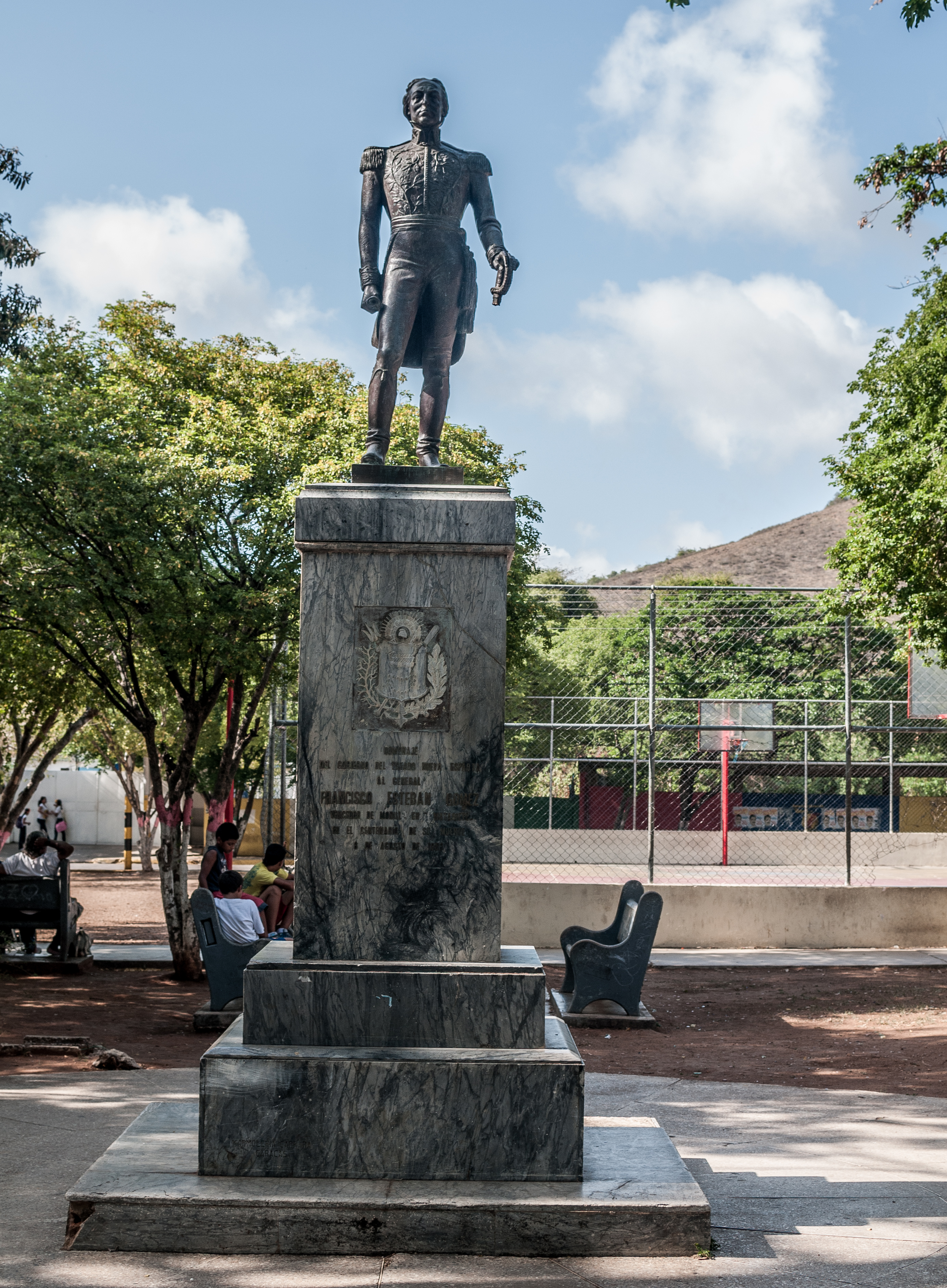
Statue of Francisco Esteban Gómez in Santa Ana
