= Delfín Gallo, Tucumán =

Coordinates: 26°51′S 65°06′W

Delfín Gallo (Tucumán)
- Interactive map of Delfín Gallo (Tucumán)
- Country: Argentina
- Province: Tucumán Province
- Time zone: UTC−3 (ART)

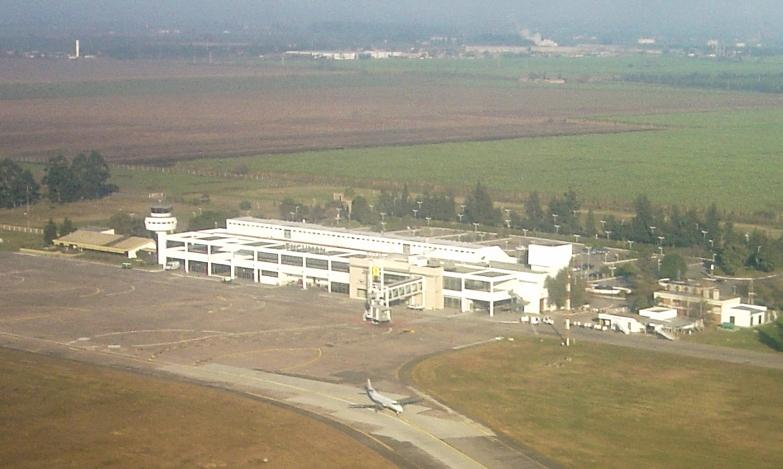
Benjamin Matienzo International Airport, Tucumán

Delfín Gallo is a settlement in Tucumán Province in northern Argentina.
