= Uriburu, La Pampa =

Coordinates: 36°30′S 63°50′W

Uriburu (La Pampa)
- Rural locality and village
- Interactive map of Uriburu (La Pampa)
- Country: Argentina
- Province: La Pampa Province
- Time zone: UTC−3 (ART)

Uriburu (La Pampa) is a village and rural locality (municipality) in La Pampa Province in Argentina.
