= 2015–16 FC Nantes season =

Nantes
2015–16 season
- Chairman: Waldemar Kita
- Manager: Michel Der Zakarian
- Stadium: Stade de la Beaujoire
- Ligue 1: 14th
- Coupe de France: Quarter-finals
- Coupe de la Ligue: Round of 32
- Top goalscorer: League: Emiliano Sala (6); All: Adryan (7)
- Highest home attendance: 31,410 vs Paris Saint-Germain (26 September 2015)
- Lowest home attendance: 18,851 vs Toulouse (12 December 2015)
Home colours	Away colours

The 2015–16 FC Nantes season was the 72nd professional season of the club since its creation in 1943.

== Players ==
=== First team squad ===
French teams are limited to four players without EU citizenship. Hence, the squad list includes only the principal nationality of each player; several non-European players on the squad have dual citizenship with an EU country. Also, players from the ACP countries—countries in Africa, the Caribbean, and the Pacific that are signatories to the Cotonou Agreement—are not counted against non-EU quotas due to the Kolpak ruling.

Note: Flags indicate national team as defined under FIFA eligibility rules; some limited exceptions apply. Players may hold more than one non-FIFA nationality.

No.	Pos.	Nation	Player
1	GK	FRA	Rémy Riou
3	DF	ALB	Ermir Lenjani (on loan from Rennes)
4	DF	VEN	Oswaldo Vizcarrondo (Captain)
5	DF	ALB	Lorik Cana
6	MF	SEN	Rémi Gomis
7	MF	USA	Alejandro Bedoya
8	MF	FRA	Adrien Thomasson
9	FW	ISL	Kolbeinn Sigþórsson
10	FW	MAR	Yacine Bammou
12	MF	MLI	Birama Touré
13	DF	FRA	Wilfried Moimbé
14	DF	FRA	Youssouf Sabaly (on loan from PSG)
15	DF	FRA	Léo Dubois
16	GK	FRA	Alexandre Olliero
17	DF	FRA	Anthony Walongwa

No.	Pos.	Nation	Player
20	MF	CGO	Jules Iloki
21	FW	FRA	Johan Audel
22	FW	ARG	Emiliano Sala
23	MF	BRA	Adryan (on loan from Flamengo)
24	MF	CMR	Alexis Alegue
25	DF	FRA	Enock Kwateng
26	DF	CIV	Koffi Djidji
27	FW	BEL	Guillaume Gillet
28	MF	FRA	Valentin Rongier
30	GK	FRA	Maxime Dupé
33	MF	FRA	Hicham M'Laab
34	FW	FRA	Thomas Henry
38	DF	COD	Aristote N'Dongala
40	GK	FRA	Quentin Braat

=== Out on loan ===
Note: Flags indicate national team as defined under FIFA eligibility rules; some limited exceptions apply. Players may hold more than one non-FIFA nationality.

No. / Pos. / Nation / Player; - / MF / FRA / Amine Oudrhiri (at Sedan)	No. / Pos. / Nation / Player; - / FW / VEN / Fernando Aristeguieta (at Red Star)

== Transfers ==
=== Transfers in ===
Date	Pos.	Player	Age	Moved from	Fee	Notes
1 July 2015	MF	(France) Adrien Thomasson	21	(France) Evian	Undisclosed	
1 July 2015	DF	(France) Wilfried Moimbé	26	(France) Brest	Free Transfer	
2 July 2015	FW	(Iceland) Kolbeinn Sigþórsson	25	(Netherlands) Ajax	£2.1 Million	
20 July 2015	FW	(Argentina) Emiliano Sala	24	(France) Bordeaux	Undisclosed	
31 August 2015	DF	(Albania) Lorik Cana	32	(Italy) Lazio	Undisclosed	
28 December 2015	DF	(Belgium) Guillaume Gillet	32	(Belgium) Anderlecht	Undisclosed	

=== Loans in ===
Date	Pos.	Player	Age	Loaned from	Return date	Notes
1 July 2015	MF	(Brazil) Adryan	20	(Brazil) Flamengo	30 June 2016	
17 August 2015	DF	(Albania) Ermir Lenjani	26	(France) Rennes	30 June 2016	
31 August 2015	DF	(France) Youssouf Sabaly	22	(France) Paris Saint-Germain	30 June 2016	

=== Transfers out ===
Date	Pos.	Player	Age	Moved to	Fee	Notes
1 July 2015	MF	(France) Vincent Bessat	29	(France) Caen	Free Transfer	
1 July 2015	DF	(Comoros) Chaker Alhadhur	23	(France) Caen	Undisclosed	
1 July 2015	MF	(France) Georges-Kévin Nkoudou	20	(France) Marseille	Undisclosed	
1 July 2015	DF	(Denmark) Kian Hansen	26	(Denmark) FC Midtjylland	Undisclosed	
1 July 2015	FW	(Togo) Serge Gakpé	28	(Italy) Genoa	Free Transfer	
1 July 2015	GK	(Poland) Erwin Zelazny	23	(France) Rodez	Free Transfer	
1 July 2015	GK	(Algeria) Nassim Badri	21	Unattached	Released	
20 July 2015	DF	(Senegal) Issa Cissokho	30	(Italy) Genoa	Undisclosed	
31 July 2015	MF	(France) Jordan Veretout	22	(England) Aston Villa	Undisclosed	
17 August 2015	DF	(France) Olivier Veigneau	30	(Turkey) Kasımpaşa	Free Transfer	
1 September 2015	DF	(Senegal) Papy Djilobodji	26	(England) Chelsea	£2.45 Million	
3 January 2016	MF	(France) Lucas Déaux	27	(Belgium) Gent	Undisclosed	
19 January 2016	FW	(Guinea) Ismaël Bangoura	31	(Saudi Arabia) Al-Raed	Undisclosed	

=== Loans out ===
Date	Pos.	Player	Age	Loaned to	Return date	Notes
1 February 2016	FW	(Venezuela) Fernando Aristeguieta	23	(France) Red Star	30 June 2016	

== Competitions ==
=== Ligue 1 ===
==== League table ====
Pos	Team	Pld	W	D	L	GF	GA	GD	Pts
12	Montpellier	38	14	7	17	49	47	+2	49
13	Marseille	38	10	18	10	48	42	+6	48
14	Nantes	38	12	12	14	33	44	−11	48
15	Lorient	38	11	13	14	47	58	−11	46
16	Guingamp	38	11	11	16	47	56	−9	44

Source: Ligue 1, Soccerway
Rules for classification: 1) Points; 2) Goal difference; 3) Goals scored; 4) Head-to-head points; 5) Head-to-head goal difference; 6) Fairplay ranking.

==== Results summary ====
Overall								Home						Away					
Pld	W	D	L	GF	GA	GD	Pts	W	D	L	GF	GA	GD	W	D	L	GF	GA	GD
38	12	11	15	33	44	−11	47	8	5	5	19	18	+1	4	6	10	14	26	−12

Last updated: 14 May 2016.
Source: Competitive matches

==== Results by round ====
Round	1	2	3	4	5	6	7	8	9	10	11	12	13	14	15	16	17	18	19	20	21	22	23	24	25	26	27	28	29	30	31	32	33	34	35	36	37	38
Ground	H	A	H	A	H	A	A	H	A	H	A	H	A	A	H	H	A	H	A	H	A	H	A	H	A	H	A	H	A	H	A	H	A	H	A	H	H	A
Result	W	D	W	L	L	L	W	L	W	W	W	L	L	L	D	D	D	D	D	W	D	D	W	W	D	W	D	D	L	W	L	L	L	L	D	W	L	L
Position	7	8	4	8	10	16	14	11	12	8	6	7	10	11	10	11	11	12	13	10	11	11	9	6	7	6	5	8	8	6	8	10	10	10	10	9	12	14

Source: Ligue1
A = Away; H = Home; W = Win; D = Draw; L = Loss

==== Matches ====
Win Draw Loss

8 August 2015 1	Nantes	1–0	Guingamp	Nantes
21:00 CEST (UTC+02:00)	Djidji (yellow card) 27'; B. Touré (yellow card) 61'; Sorbon 89' (o.g.)	Report	Lévêque (yellow card) 37'; Diallo (yellow card) 41'; Sankharé (yellow card) 66'	Stadium: Stade de la Beaujoire; Attendance: 27,248; Referee: Benoît Bastien

15 August 2015 2	Angers	0–0	Nantes	Angers
20:00 CEST (UTC+02:00)	Mangani (yellow card) 34'; Ketkeophomphone (yellow card) 42'; Saïss (yellow card) 54'	Report	Adryan (yellow card) 23'; Rongier (yellow card) 28'; B. Touré (yellow card) 32'; Thomasson (yellow card) 63'	Stadium: Stade Jean Bouin; Attendance: 15,969; Referee: Amaury Delerue

22 August 2015 3	Nantes	1–0	Reims	Nantes
20:00 CEST (UTC+02:00)	Sigþórsson (yellow card) 13'; Lenjani 77'	Report	Kankava (yellow card) 40'; Weber (yellow card) 57'; Mfulu (yellow card) 65'	Stadium: Stade de la Beaujoire; Attendance: 23,854; Referee: Hakim Ben El Hadj

30 August 2015 4	Bordeaux	2–0	Nantes	Bordeaux
17:00 CEST (UTC+02:00)	Chantôme (yellow card) 22'; Crivelli (yellow card) 36'; Khazri 45+2'; Yambéré (yellow card) 54'; Gajić 87'	Report	Dubois (yellow card) 36'; Lenjani (yellow card) 45+4', (red card) 51'; B. Touré (yellow card) 65'	Stadium: Nouveau Stade de Bordeaux; Attendance: 26,307; Referee: Clément Turpin

13 September 2015 5	Nantes	0–2	Rennes	Nantes
17:00 CEST (UTC+02:00)	Djidji (yellow card) 49'; Adryan (red card) 52'; Dubois (yellow card) 56'; Sigþórsson (red card) 78'	Report	Sylla (yellow card) 37'; Ntep (yellow card) 45', (goal) 67'; Mexer (yellow card) 65'; Sio 89'	Stadium: Stade de la Beaujoire; Attendance: 27,262; Referee: Stéphane Lannoy

20 September 2015 6	Saint-Étienne	2–0	Nantes	Saint-Étienne
17:00 CEST (UTC+02:00)	Malcuit (yellow card) 18'; Bamba 26'; Berić (yellow card) 30', (goal) 47'	Report	Déaux (yellow card) 79'	Stadium: Stade Geoffroy-Guichard; Attendance: 28,846; Referee: Benoît Millot

25 September 2015 8	Nantes	1–4	Paris Saint-Germain	Nantes
17:00 CEST (UTC+02:00)	Bammou 11'; Lenjani (yellow card) 40'; Vizcarrondo (yellow card) 69'	Report	Ibrahimović 48', (yellow card) 67'; Cavani 73'; Di María 80'; Aurier 90+1'	Stadium: Stade de la Beaujoire; Attendance: 31,410; Referee: Amaury Delerue

29 September 2015 7	Lille	0–1	Nantes	Villeneuve d'Ascq
18:30 CEST (UTC+02:00)		Report	Iloki 5'; Thomasson (yellow card) 31'; Cana (yellow card) 50'; Déaux (yellow card) 71'	Stadium: Stade Pierre-Mauroy; Attendance: 27,667; Referee: Jérôme Miguelgorry

17 October 2015 10	Nantes	3–0	Troyes	Nantes
20:00 CEST (UTC+02:00)	Rongier 41'; Sabaly 50'; Bammou 62'	Report	Veškovac (yellow card) 71'	Stadium: Stade de la Beaujoire; Attendance: 24,402; Referee: Mikael Lesage

23 October 2015 11	Caen	0–2	Nantes	Caen
18:30 CEST (UTC+02:00)	Appiah (yellow card) 71'	Report	Bammou 23'; Thomasson 61'; Moimbé (yellow card) 73'; Riou (yellow card) 83'	Stadium: Stade Michel d'Ornano; Attendance: 19,571; Referee: Stéphane Lannoy

1 November 2015 12	Nantes	0–1	Marseille	Nantes
21:00 CET (UTC+01:00)	Bammou (yellow card) 55'; Moimbé (yellow card) 90+1'	Report	Nkoudou 53'; Cabella (yellow card) 90+3'	Stadium: Stade de la Beaujoire; Attendance: 27,392; Referee: Lionel Jaffredo

4 November 2015 9	Nice	1–2	Nantes	Nice
18:30 CET (UTC+01:00)	Genevois 42'; Pied (yellow card) 67'	Report	Alegue 11'; Vizcarrondo (yellow card) 65'; Thomasson (yellow card) 68'; Sigþórsson 70'; Sabaly (yellow card) 75'	Stadium: Allianz Riviera; Attendance: 17,531; Referee: Sébastien Moreira

7 November 2015 13	Montpellier	2–1	Nantes	Montpellier
20:00 CET (UTC+01:00)	Roussillon 12'; Hilton 90'	Report	Iloki (yellow card) 50'; Vizcarrondo (yellow card) 56'; Bammou 63'; Touré (yellow card) 65'; Cana (yellow card) 65'	Stadium: Stade de la Mosson; Attendance: 15,356; Referee: Frank Schneider

21 November 2015 14	Monaco	1–0	Nantes	Fontvieille
20:00 CET (UTC+01:00)	Pašalić 43'; Carvalho (yellow card) 70'; L.Traoré (yellow card) 72'	Report	Sabaly (yellow card) 42'	Stadium: Stade Louis II; Attendance: 5,733; Referee: Antony Gautier

28 November 2015 15	Nantes	0–0	Bastia	Nantes
20:00 CET (UTC+01:00)	Cana (yellow card) 14'; Bedoya (yellow card) 59' (yellow-red card); Moimbé (yellow card) 78'	Report	Cahuzac (yellow card) 59'; Danic (yellow card) 82'	Stadium: Stade de la Beaujoire; Attendance: 25,978; Referee: Nicolas Rainville

1 December 2015 16	Nantes	0–0	Lyon	Nantes
21:00 CET (UTC+01:00)	Sabaly (yellow card) 17'	Report	Rafael (yellow card) 14'; Ghezzal (yellow card) 81'	Stadium: Stade de la Beaujoire; Attendance: 20,896; Referee: Amaury Delerue

5 December 2015 17	Gazélec Ajaccio	1–1	Nantes	Ajaccio, Corsica
20:00 CET (UTC+01:00)	Ducourtioux (yellow card) 31'; Tshibumbu (yellow card) 45+2', (goal) 84'	Report	Vizcarrondo (yellow card) 50'; Sala 56'; Sabaly (yellow card) 72'	Stadium: Stade Ange Casanova; Attendance: 3,614; Referee: Wilfried Bien

12 December 2015 18	Nantes	1–1	Toulouse	Nantes
20:00 CET (UTC+01:00)	Déaux (yellow card) 35'; Audel (yellow card) 53'; Sala (yellow card) 85', (goal) 86'; Henry (yellow card) 90+1'	Report	Doumbia (yellow card) 26'; Pešić 53'; Ben Yedder (yellow card) 57'; Matheus (yellow card) 83'; Bodiger (yellow card) 87'; Diop (red card) 90+1'	Stadium: Stade de la Beaujoire; Attendance: 18,851; Referee: Hakim Ben El Hadj

19 December 2015 19	Lorient	0–0	Nantes	Lorient
20:00 CET (UTC+01:00)		Report	Dubois (yellow card) 28'; Audel (yellow card) 76'; Thomasson (yellow card) 90+1'	Stadium: Stade du Moustoir; Attendance: 14,711; Referee: Fredy Fautrel

10 January 2016 20	Nantes	2–1	Saint-Étienne	Nantes
14:00 CET (UTC+01:00)	Audel 29'; Sigþórsson 77'; Gillet (yellow card) 84'	Report	Roux 14' (pen.); Pajot (yellow card) 31'; Brison (yellow card) 86'; Maupay (yellow card) 90+3'	Stadium: Stade de la Beaujoire; Attendance: 25,509; Referee: Stéphane Lannoy

16 January 2016 21	Guingamp	2–2	Nantes	Guingamp
20:00 CET (UTC+01:00)	Benezet 3'; Salibur (yellow card) 14' (goal) 23'; Lemaître (yellow card) 63'; Diallo (yellow card) 74'; Martins Pereira (yellow card) 87'; Sankharé (red card) 90+4'	Report	Kerbrat 64' (o.g.); Sabaly 90+2'; Sigþórsson (yellow card) 90+3'	Stadium: Stade du Roudourou; Attendance: 13,762; Referee: Antony Gautier

23 January 2016 22	Nantes	2–2	Bordeaux	Nantes
20:00 CET (UTC+01:00)	Sigþórsson 1'; Bedoya 30'; Djidji (yellow card) 49'; Thomasson (yellow card) 90+6'	Report	Biyogo Poko (yellow card) 41'; Khazri (yellow card) 54'; Ounas (yellow card) 66'; Yamberé (yellow card) 90+6'; Diabaté 84'; Cana 90+4' (o.g.)	Stadium: Stade de la Beaujoire; Attendance: 21,893; Referee: Tony Chapron

30 January 2016 23	Troyes	0–1	Nantes	Troyes
20:00 CET (UTC+01:00)	Jean (yellow card) 67'	Report	Gillet 41', (yellow card) 87'; Moimbé (yellow card) 65'; Riou (yellow card) 68'	Stadium: Stade de l'Aube; Attendance: 11,592; Referee: Johan Hamel

3 February 2016 24	Nantes	3–1	Gazélec Ajaccio	Nantes
19:00 CET (UTC+01:00)	Sala 14'; Bedoya 23'; Gillet (yellow card) 45'; Adryan 58'	Report	Mayi 26'; Youga (red card) 51'; Mangane (yellow card) 56'	Stadium: Stade de la Beaujoire; Attendance: 24,799; Referee: Saïd Ennjimi

6 February 2016 25	Toulouse	0–0	Nantes	Toulouse
20:00 CET (UTC+01:00)	Trejo (yellow card) 36'; Moubandje (yellow card) 90'	Report	Sabaly (yellow card) 16'; Thomasson (yellow card) 37'; Sala (yellow card) 86'; Bammou (yellow card) 90'	Stadium: Stadium Municipal; Attendance: 11,570; Referee: Lionel Jaffredo

13 February 2016 26	Nantes	2–1	Lorient	Nantes
20:00 CET (UTC+01:00)	Adryan 10'; Sala 39'; Bammou (yellow card) 80'	Report	Touré (yellow card) 53'; N'Dong (yellow card) 55'; Cabot (yellow card) 71'; Moukandjo 79' (pen.); Gassama (red card) 85'	Stadium: Stade de la Beaujoire; Attendance: 22,256; Referee: Antony Gautier

28 February 2016 28	Nantes	0–0	Monaco	Nantes
14:00 CET (UTC+1)	Gillet (yellow card) 74'	Report	Lottin (yellow card) 53'	Stadium: Stade de la Beaujoire; Attendance: Mikael Lesage; Referee: 26,866

6 March 2016 29	Rennes	4–1	Nantes	Rennes
17:00 CET (UTC+1)	Dembélé 1', 23', 45'; Grosicki 15'; Armand (yellow card) 28'; Sio (yellow card) 35' (yellow-red card) 67'	Report	Sigþórsson (yellow card) 24'; Vizcarrondo (yellow card) 45'; Adryan 60'; Audel (yellow card) 79'	Stadium: Roazhon Park; Attendance: 29,060; Referee: Ruddy Buquet

9 March 2016 27	Bastia	0–0	Nantes	Furiani
18:30 CET (UTC+1)	Modesto (yellow card) 56'	Report	Sabaly (yellow card) 19'; Iloki (yellow card) 43'; Sigþórsson 77'; Bammou 84'	Stadium: Stade Armand Cesari; Attendance: 11,071; Referee: Sébastien Moreira

13 March 2016 30	Nantes	2–0	Angers	Nantes
17:00 CEST (UTC+02:00)	Adryan (yellow card) 26'; Gomis (yellow card) 36'; Sala 49', 69'	Report	N'Doye (yellow card) 7'; Traoré (yellow card) 45'; Angoula (yellow card) 87'	Stadium: Stade de la Beaujoire; Attendance: 32,611; Referee: Benoît Bastien

19 March 2016 31	Lyon	2–0	Nantes	Lyon
21:00 CET (UTC+1)	Rafael (yellow card) 67'; Perrin 83'; Lacazette 90+4' (pen.)	Report	Bedoya (yellow card) 42'; Cana (yellow card) 64'	Stadium: Parc Olympique Lyonnais; Attendance: 47,505; Referee: Benoît Millot

3 April 2016 32	Nantes	0–3	Lille	Nantes
14:00 CET (UTC+1)	Gomis (yellow card) 61'; Sabaly (yellow card) 81'	Report	Eder 19', 90+2'; Sunzu 58'; Civelli (yellow card) 83'	Stadium: Stade de la Beaujoire; Attendance: 25,518; Referee: Tony Chapron

9 April 2016 33	Reims	2–1	Nantes	Reims
20:00 CET (UTC+1)	Kankava (yellow card) 6'; Oniangue 11'; Signorino (yellow card) 74'; Sabaly 80' (o.g.)	Report	Bammou (yellow card) 30', (red card) 85'; Audel (yellow card) 59', (goal) 68'; Cana (yellow card) 79'	Stadium: Stade Auguste Delaune; Attendance: 12,143; Referee: Bartolomeu Varela

17 April 2016 34	Nantes	0–2	Montpellier	Nantes
14:00 CET (UTC+1)	Vizcarrondo (yellow card) 45+1'	Report	Dabo 23'; Jourdren (yellow card) 43'; Congré (yellow card) 60'; Skhiri 71'	Stadium: Stade de la Beaujoire; Attendance: 21,789; Referee: Stephane Jochem

24 April 2016 35	Marseille	1–1	Nantes	Marseille
17:00 CET (UTC+01:00)	Thauvin 49'; Romao (red card) 56'; Mendy (yellow card) 90'	Report	Nkoulou 31' (o.g.); Thomasson (yellow card) 44'; Bammou (yellow card) 79'; Vizcarrondo (yellow card) 81'	Stadium: Stade Vélodrome; Attendance: 19,898; Referee: Stéphane Lannoy

30 April 2016 36	Nantes	1–0	Nice	Nantes
14:00 CET (UTC+1)	Thomasson 68'; Vizcarrondo (yellow card) 73'	Report	Pied (yellow card) 88'	Stadium: Stade de la Beaujoire; Attendance: 21,442; Referee: Antony Gautier

7 May 2016 37	Nantes	1–2	Caen	Nantes
21:00 CEST (UTC+02:00)	Djidji (yellow card) 50'; Bedoya 78'; Sala (yellow card) 90'	Report	Rodelin 5'; Delort 45' (pen.); Delaplcae (yellow card) 61'; Adeoti (yellow card) 76'	Stadium: Stade de la Beaujoire; Attendance: 30,321; Referee: Johan Hamel

14 May 2016 38	Paris Saint Germain	4–0	Nantes	Paris
21:00 CET (UTC+1)	Ibrahimović 18', 89'; Rabiot (yellow card) 38'; Lucas 43'; Marquinhos 52'	Report	Gillet (yellow card) 51'	Stadium: Parc des Princes; Attendance: 47,844; Referee: Lionel Jaffredo

=== Coupe de la Ligue ===
28 October 2015 Round of 32	Boug-Péronnas	3–2 (a.e.t.)	Nantes	Bourg-en-Bresse
21:00 CET (UTC+01:00)	Goyon (yellow card) 13'; Traoré 38'; Boussaha 58' (pen.), 105' (pen.); Boujedra (yellow card) 64'	Report	Adryan 26', 50'; Djidji (red card) 51'; Lenjani (yellow card) 74'; Déaux (yellow card) 105'	Stadium: Stade Marcel-Verchère; Attendance: 4,694; Referee: François Letexier

=== Coupe de France ===
2 January 2016 Round of 64	Blanc-Mesnil Sport	0–2	Nantes	Saint-Ouen
15:30 CET (UTC+01:00)		Report	Thomasson 40'; Adryan 69'	Stadium: Stade Bauer; Attendance: 2,999; Referee: Olivier Husset

20 January 2016 Round of 32	Mantes 78	0–1 (a.e.t.)	Nantes	Mantes-la-Ville
18:00 CET (UTC+01:00)	M'Bobilelo (yellow card) 79'	Report	Djidji (yellow card) 26'; Iloki (yellow card) 57'; Kwateng (yellow card) 49'; Bedoya 105'; Gillet (yellow card) 109'	Stadium: Stade Aimé Bergeal; Attendance: 5,500; Referee: Olivier Husset

10 February 2016 Round of 16	Bordeaux	3–4 (a.e.t.)	Nantes	Bordeaux
19:00 CET (UTC+01:00)	Crivelli 23'; Biyogo Poko 51'; Touré (yellow card) 72'; Malcolm 98'	Report	Bammou 6'; Sigþórsson 65'; Moimbé (yellow card) 70'; Audel 115' (yellow card) 120'; Bedoya 118'	Stadium: Nouveau Stade de Bordeaux; Attendance: 9,207; Referee: Frank Schneider

March 2016 Quarter-final	Sochaux	3–2 (a.e.t.)	Nantes	Montbéliard
CET (UTC+01:00)	Sao 87', 106'; Cissé 98'	Report	Gillet 5'; Thomasson (yellow card) 88'; Riou (yellow card) 89'; Adryan 116'	Stadium: Stade Auguste Bonal; Attendance: 9,790; Referee: Tony Chapron
