= 2016–17 FC Nantes season =

Nantes
2016–17 season
- Chairman: Waldemar Kita
- Manager: René Girard; Sérgio Conceição
- Stadium: Stade de la Beaujoire
- Ligue 1: 7th
- Coupe de France: Round of 32
- Coupe de la Ligue: Quarter-finals
- Top goalscorer: League: Emiliano Sala (12); All: Emiliano Sala (15)
Home colours	Away colours	Third colours

Football Club de Nantes (Breton: Naoned, Gallo: Naunnt), commonly referred to as FC Nantes or simply Nantes, is a French association football club based in Nantes, Pays de la Loire. During the 2016–17 campaign, they competed in the following competitions: Ligue 1, the Coupe de France and the Coupe de la Ligue.

== Players ==
=== First team squad ===
French teams are limited to four players without EU citizenship. Hence, the squad list includes only the principal nationality of each player; several non-European players on the squad have dual citizenship with an EU country. Also, players from the ACP countries—countries in Africa, the Caribbean, and the Pacific that are signatories to the Cotonou Agreement—are not counted against non-EU quotas due to the Kolpak ruling. Note: Flags indicate national team as defined under FIFA eligibility rules; some limited exceptions apply. Players may hold more than one non-FIFA nationality.

No.	Pos.	Nation	Player
1	GK	FRA	Rémy Riou (captain)
3	DF	BRA	Diego Carlos
4	DF	VEN	Oswaldo Vizcarrondo
6	DF	BRA	Lucas Lima
7	MF	FRA	Jules Iloki
8	MF	FRA	Adrien Thomasson
9	FW	ARG	Emiliano Sala
10	FW	MAR	Yacine Bammou
11	MF	SWE	Alexander Kačaniklić
13	DF	FRA	Wilfried Moimbé
14	MF	FRA	Amine Harit
15	DF	FRA	Léo Dubois
16	GK	FRA	Alexandre Olliero

No.	Pos.	Nation	Player
17	DF	COD	Anthony Walongwa
18	FW	POL	Mariusz Stępiński
19	MF	FRA	Abdoulaye Touré
20	FW	COL	Felipe Pardo (on loan from Olympiacos)
22	FW	BFA	Préjuce Nakoulma
23	MF	POR	Sérgio Oliveira (on loan from Porto)
24	MF	CMR	Alexis Alégué
25	DF	FRA	Enock Kwateng
26	DF	CIV	Koffi Djidji
27	MF	BEL	Guillaume Gillet
28	MF	FRA	Valentin Rongier
30	GK	FRA	Maxime Dupé
40	GK	FRA	Quentin Braat
—	FW	ISL	Kolbeinn Sigþórsson

== Transfers ==
=== Summer ===
In:

No.	Pos.	Nation	Player
2	FW	VEN	Fernando Aristeguieta (loan return from (France) Red Star)
3	DF	BRA	Diego Carlos (from (Portugal) Estoril)
6	DF	BRA	Lucas Lima (from (Portugal) Arouca)
11	MF	SWE	Alexander Kačaniklić (from (England) Fulham)
18	FW	POL	Mariusz Stępiński (from (Poland) Ruch Chorzów)
23	MF	DEN	Nicolaj Thomsen (from (Denmark) Aalborg BK)

Out:

No.	Pos.	Nation	Player
—	DF	ALB	Lorik Cana (retired)
—	FW	ISL	Kolbeinn Sigþórsson (on loan at (Turkey) Galatasaray)
—	MF	ALB	Ermir Lenjani (loan return to (France) Rennes)
—	DF	FRA	Youssouf Sabaly (loan return to (France) Paris Saint-Germain, later loaned to (France) Bordeaux)
—	MF	USA	Alejandro Bedoya (to (United States) Philadelphia Union)
—	MF	MLI	Birama Touré (to (Belgium) Standard Liège)
—	FW	MTQ	Johan Audel (to (Israel) Beitar Jerusalem)
—	MF	SEN	Rémi Gomis (to (Switzerland) Wil)

=== Winter ===
In:

No.	Pos.	Nation	Player
20	FW	COL	Felipe Pardo (on loan from (Greece) Olympiacos)
22	FW	BFA	Préjuce Nakoulma (free agent)
23	MF	POR	Sérgio Oliveira (on loan from (Portugal) Porto)
—	FW	ISL	Kolbeinn Sigþórsson (loan return from (Turkey) Galatasaray)

Out:

No.	Pos.	Nation	Player
2	FW	VEN	Fernando Aristeguieta (to (Portugal) Nacional)
23	MF	DEN	Nicolaj Thomsen (to (Denmark) Copenhagen)

== Competitions ==
=== Ligue 1 ===
==== League table ====
Pos	Team	Pld	W	D	L	GF	GA	GD	Pts	Qualification or relegation
5	Marseille	38	17	11	10	57	41	+16	62	Qualification for the Europa League third qualifying round (Note: Since the winners of the 2016–17 Coupe de France and the 2016–17 Coupe de la Ligue, Paris Saint-Germain, qualified for European competition based on league position, the spot awarded to the Coupe de France winners (Europa League group stage) was passed to the fourth-placed team and the spot awarded to the Coupe de la Ligue winners (Europa League third qualifying round) was passed to the sixth-placed team. The fifth-placed team received the spot in Europa League third qualifying round originally designated to the fourth-placed team.)
6	Bordeaux	38	15	14	9	53	43	+10	59	Qualification for the Europa League third qualifying round
7	Nantes	38	14	9	15	40	54	−14	51	
8	Saint-Étienne	38	12	14	12	41	42	−1	50	
9	Rennes	38	12	14	12	36	42	−6	50	

Source: Ligue 1, Soccerway
Rules for classification: 1) Points; 2) Goal difference; 3) Goals scored; 4) Head-to-head goal difference; 5) Fairplay ranking.

==== Results summary ====
Overall								Home						Away					
Pld	W	D	L	GF	GA	GD	Pts	W	D	L	GF	GA	GD	W	D	L	GF	GA	GD
38	14	9	15	40	54	−14	51	8	4	7	19	24	−5	6	5	8	21	30	−9

Last updated: 14 May 2017.
Source: Ligue1

==== Matches ====
13 August 2016 1	Dijon	0–1	Nantes	Dijon
20:00 CEST (UTC+2)		Report	Thomsen 49', (yellow card) 73'; Iloki (yellow card) 67'	Stadium: Stade Gaston Gérard; Attendance: 9,236; Referee: Karim Abed

20 August 2016 2	Nantes	0–1	Monaco	Nantes
17:00 CEST (UTC+2)	Gillet (yellow card) 83'; Diego Carlos (yellow card) 89'	Report	Boschilia 25'; Tisserand (yellow card) 33'; Glik (yellow card) 87'; Subašić (yellow card) 89'; Jean (yellow card) 90+2'	Stadium: Stade de la Beaujoire; Attendance: 25,908; Referee: Stéphane Lannoy

28 August 2016 3	Bordeaux	1–0	Nantes	Bordeaux
15:00 CEST (UTC+2)	Rolán 31'; Touré (yellow card) 45+2'; Sabaly (yellow card) 83'	Report	Diego Carlos (yellow card) 53'	Stadium: Matmut Atlantique; Attendance: 23,207; Referee: Benoît Bastien

11 September 2016 4	Nantes	0–3	Metz	Nantes
15:00 CEST (UTC+2)	Vizcarrondo (yellow card) 76'	Report	Erdinç 18', 45+3', 78' (pen.); Sarr (yellow card) 24'; Nguette (yellow card) 26'; Cohade (yellow card) 58'; Milan (yellow card) 65'	Stadium: Stade de la Beaujoire; Attendance: 19,438; Referee: Jérôme Miguelgorry

17 September 2016 5	Nancy	1–1	Nantes	Tomblaine
20:00 CEST (UTC+2)	Puyo 72'	Report	Stępiński 66'	Stadium: Stade Marcel Picot; Attendance: 17,034; Referee: Tony Chapron

21 September 2016 6	Nantes	1–1	Saint-Étienne	Nantes
19:00 CEST (UTC+2)	Lucas Lima (yellow card) 25'; Kačaniklić (yellow card) 49'; Walongwa (yellow card) 55'; Vizcarrondo (yellow card) 78'	Report	Malcuit (red card) 16'	Stadium: Stade de la Beaujoire; Attendance: 18,823; Referee: Amaury Delerue

25 September 2016 7	Marseille	2–1	Nantes	Marseille
20:45 CEST (UTC+02:00)	Zambo Anguissa (yellow card) 21'; N'Jie 22'; Gomis 53'	Report	Sala 2'; Kwateng (yellow card) 25'; Vizcarrondo (yellow card) 84'; Harit (yellow card) 90+2'	Stadium: Stade Vélodrome; Attendance: 25,121; Referee: Lionel Jaffredo

1 October 2016 8	Nantes	1–0	Bastia	Nantes
20:00 CEST (UTC+02:00)	Stępiński 18'; Sala (yellow card) 38'; Vizcarrondo (yellow card) 61'; Harit (yellow card) 65'; Bammou (yellow card) 90+2'	Report	Coulibaly (yellow card) 34'; Marange (yellow card) 55'; Mostefa (yellow card) 65'	Stadium: Stade de la Beaujoire; Attendance: 20,129; Referee: Bartolomeu Varela

15 October 2016 9	Lorient	1–2	Nantes	Lorient
20:00 CEST (UTC+02:00)	Mvuemba (yellow card) 27'; Touré (yellow card) 62'; Hamel 80'; Moreira (yellow card) 90'; Ciani (yellow card) 90+4'	Report	Dubois (yellow card) 39'; Bammou 42'; Sala (yellow card) 49'; Gillet 74'; Thomasson (yellow card) 90'; Kwateng (yellow card) 90+1'	Stadium: Stade du Moustoir; Attendance: 12,458; Referee: Benoît Bastien

22 October 2016 10	Nantes	1–2	Rennes	Nantes
20:00 CEST (UTC+02:00)	Thomasson (yellow card) 28'; Sala 42'	Report	Ntep (yellow card) 16'; Grosicki 58', 75'; Hunou (yellow card) 81'; André (yellow card) 90+1'	Stadium: Stade de la Beaujoire; Attendance: 29,015; Referee: Johan Hamel

30 October 2016 11	Nice	4–1	Nantes	Nice
15:00 CEST (UTC+2)	Cyprien 9', 65', (yellow card) 64'; Balotelli 27'; Pléa 60'	Report	Lima (yellow card) 31'; Djidji (yellow card) 38'; Sala 47', (yellow card) 53'	Stadium: Allianz Riviera; Attendance: 24,418; Referee: Sébastien Moreira

5 November 2016 12	Nantes	1–1	Toulouse	Nantes
20:00 CET (UTC+01:00)	Diego Carlos (yellow card) 35'; Vizcarrondo (yellow card) 61'; Gillet (yellow card) 65'; Djidji (yellow card) 74'	Report	Braithwaite 36' (pen.); Diop (yellow card) 73'; Ninkov (yellow card) 87'	Stadium: Stade de la Beaujoire; Attendance: 21,138; Referee: Mikael Lesage

19 November 2016 13	Paris Saint-Germain	2–0	Nantes	Paris
17:00 CET (UTC+1)	Di María 13'; Jesé 90' (pen.)	Report	Thomasson (yellow card) 67'	Stadium: Parc des Princes; Attendance: 44,258; Referee: François Letexier

26 November 2016 14	Nantes	0–0	Lille	Nantes
20:00 CET (UTC+1)		Report		Stadium: Stade de la Beaujoire; Attendance: 18,125; Referee: Olivier Thual

30 November 2016 15	Nantes	0–6	Lyon	Nantes
19:00 CET (UTC+1)		Report	Tolisso 16'; Lacazette 39' (pen.); Gonalons 42'; Valbuena 60'; Diakhaby 75'; Fekir 81'	Stadium: Stade de la Beaujoire; Attendance: 18,964; Referee: Clément Turpin

3 December 2016 16	Guingamp	2–0	Nantes	Guingamp
20:00 CEST (UTC+01:00)	Briand 22'; Salibur 64'	Report		Stadium: Stade de Roudourou; Attendance: 12,643; Referee: Johan Hamel

16 December 2016 17	Angers	0–2	Nantes	Angers
20:45 CET (UTC+1)		Report	Gillet 19'; Harit 48'	Stadium: Stade Raymond Kopa; Attendance: 12,857; Referee: Amaury Delerue

21 December 2016 18	Nantes	1–0	Montpellier	Nantes
20:50 CET (UTC+1)	Lucas Lima 12' (pen.)	Report		Stadium: Stade de la Beaujoire; Attendance: 18,125; Referee: Karim Abed

14 January 2016 19	Toulouse	0–1	Nantes	Toulouse
20:00 CET (UTC+01:00)		Report	Sala 27'	Stadium: Stadium Municipal; Attendance: 11,023; Referee: Ruddy Buquet

18 January 2016 20	Nantes	1–0	Caen	Nantes
20:00 CEST (UTC+01:00)	Sala 64'	Report		Stadium: Stade de la Beaujoire; Attendance: 17,818; Referee: (France) Jérôme Miguelgorry

21 January 2017 21	Nantes	0–2	Paris Saint-Germain	Nantes
17:00 CET (UTC+1)		Report	Cavani 21', 65'	Stadium: Stade de la Beaujoire; Attendance: 32,858; Referee: Johan Hamel

28 January 2017 22	Rennes	1–1	Nantes	Rennes
20:00 CET (UTC+1)	Gnagnon 87'	Report	Iloki 45'	Stadium: Roazhon Park; Attendance: 23,664; Referee: Mikael Lesage

5 February 2017 23	Nantes	0–2	Nancy	Nantes
17:00 CET (UTC+1)		Report	Dia 50'; Cétout 64'	Stadium: Stade de la Beaujoire; Attendance: 20,250; Referee: Clément Turpin

12 February 2017 24	Nantes	3–2	Marseille	Nantes
21:00 CET (UTC+1)	Diego Carlos 12'; Stępiński 20'; Thomasson 50'	Report	Gomis 49', 61'	Stadium: Stade de la Beaujoire; Attendance: 32,471; Referee: François Letexier

18 February 2017 25	Metz	1–1	Nantes	Metz
20:00 CEST	Diabaté 90+1' (pen.)	Report	Rongier 68'	Stadium: Stade Saint-Symphorien; Attendance: 13,022; Referee: Bartolomeu Varela

24 February 2017 26	Nantes	3–1	Dijon	Nantes
15:00 CET (UTC+1)	Bammou 3'; Sala 59' (pen.); Felipe Pardo 79'	Report	Dubois 37' (o.g.)	Stadium: Stade de la Beaujoire; Attendance: 19,915; Referee: Tony Chapron

1 March 2017 27	Bastia	2–2	Nantes	Furiani
19:30 CET (UTC+1)	Danic 69'; Oniangué 75'	Report	Sala 78'; Diego Carlos 90+2'	Stadium: Stade Armand Cesari; Attendance: 11,539; Referee: Ruddy Buquet

5 March 2017 28	Monaco	4–0	Nantes	Fontvieille
21:00 CET (UTC+1)	Mbappé 4', 45+1'; Germain 43'; Fabinho 59' (pen.)	Report		Stadium: Stade Louis II; Attendance: 7,649; Referee: Mikael Lesage

11 March 2017 29	Montpellier	2–3	Nantes	Montpellier
20:00 CET (UTC+1)	Mounié 12'; Boudebouz 84'	Report	Nakoulma 24', 68'; Sala 89'	Stadium: Stade de la Mosson; Attendance: 10,722; Referee: Karim Abed

18 March 2017 30	Nantes	1–1	Nice	Nantes
17:00 CET (UTC+1)	Sala 22'	Report	Seri 28'	Stadium: Stade de la Beaujoire; Attendance: 25,854; Referee: Benoît Millot

2 April 2017 31	Nantes	2–1	Angers	Nantes
17:00 CEST (UTC+2)	Nakoulma 47', 54'	Report	Diédhiou 55'	Stadium: Stade de la Beaujoire; Attendance: 28,192; Referee: Olivier Thual

9 April 2017 32	Saint-Étienne	1–1	Nantes	Saint-Étienne
17:00 CEST (UTC+2)	Corgnet 70'	Summary	Nakoulma 15'	Stadium: Stade Geoffroy-Guichard; Attendance: 30,134; Referee: Clément Turpin

16 April 2017 33	Nantes	0–1	Bordeaux	Nantes
15:00 CET (UTC+1)		Report	Sankharé 65'	Stadium: Stade de la Beaujoire; Attendance: 26,373; Referee: François Letexier

22 April 2017 34	Caen	3–2	Nantes	Caen
20:00 CEST (UTC+2)		Report	Bammou 27', 35'	Stadium: Stade Michel d'Ornano; Attendance: 15,972; Referee: Jérôme Brisard

29 April 2017 35	Nantes	1–0	Lorient	Nantes
20:00	Sala 89'	Summary		Stadium: Stade de la Beaujoire - Louis Fonteneau; Attendance: 22,090; Referee: Johan Hamel

7 May 2017 36	Lyon	3–2	Nantes	Décines-Charpieu
17:00 CEST (UTC+2)	Fekir 65' (pen.); Cornet 70', 80'	Report	Rongier 19'; Diego Carlos (yellow card) 45'; Gillet 75'; Bammou (yellow card) 82'	Stadium: Parc Olympique Lyonnais; Attendance: 34,473; Referee: Mikael Lesage

14 May 2017 37	Nantes	4–1	Guingamp	Nantes
21:00 CEST (UTC+01:00)	Thomasson 16'; Sala 51', 78'; Nakoulma 69'	Report	Deaux 74'	Stadium: Stade de la Beaujoire; Attendance: 20,417; Referee: Karim Abed

20 May 2017 38	Lille	3–0	Nantes	Villeneuve d'Ascq
21:00 CET (UTC+1)	De Préville 16', 46', 53' (pen.)	Report		Stadium: Stade Pierre-Mauroy; Attendance: 28,390; Referee: Sébastien Desiage

=== Coupe de France ===
7 January 2017 Round of 64	Blois Foot 41	1–2	Nantes	Blois
18:00 CET	Cissé 45+1'		Stępiński 23', 66'	Stadium: Stade Municipal des Allées Jean Leroi; Attendance: 5,500; Referee: Jérôme Brisard

31 January 2017 Round of 32	Lille	1–0	Nantes	Lille
18:00 CET	Corchia 80' (pen.)			Stadium: Stade Pierre-Mauroy; Attendance: 7,571; Referee: Sébastien Desiage

=== Coupe de la Ligue ===
25 October 2016 Third round	Nantes	2–1	Angers	Nantes
21:00	Sala 28'; Thomasson 47'		Capelle 51'	Stadium: Stade de la Beaujoire; Attendance: 32,003; Referee: Tony Chapron

13 December 2016 Round of 16	Nantes	3–1	Montpellier	Nantes
18:45	Sala 18', 43'; Stępiński 62'	Report	Bérigaud 36'	Stadium: Stade de la Beaujoire; Attendance: 16,249; Referee: Ruddy Buquet

10 January 2017 Quarter-finals	Nantes	0–2	Nancy	Nantes
18:30		Report	Dalé 31'; Cuffaut 45+3'	Stadium: Stade de la Beaujoire; Attendance: 10,349; Referee: Clément Turpin
