= 2018–19 FC Nantes season =

Nantes
2018–19 season
- Chairman: Waldemar Kita
- Manager: Vahid Halilhodžić
- Stadium: Stade de la Beaujoire
- Ligue 1: 12th
- Coupe de France: Semi-finals
- Coupe de la Ligue: Round of 16
- Top goalscorer: League: Emiliano Sala (12); All: Emiliano Sala (13)
- Highest home attendance: League/All: 34,471 (17 April 2019 v. Paris Saint-Germain)
- Lowest home attendance: League: 15,780 (8 January 2019 v. Montpellier); All: 9,141 (5 February 2019 v. Toulouse, CdF Ro16)
- Average home league attendance: 25,184
- Biggest win: 5–0 (4 November 2018 v. Guingamp)
- Biggest defeat: 0–3 (thrice) (7 October 2018 at Bordeaux) (30 November 2018 at Saint-Étienne) (3 April 2019 at Paris Saint-Germain, CdF SF)
Home colours	Away colours	Third colours

The 2018–19 FC Nantes season was the 75th professional season of the club since its creation in 1943, and the club's 6th consecutive season in the top flight of French football. It covers a period from 1 July 2018 to 30 June 2019. They participated in the Ligue 1, the Coupe de France and Coupe de la Ligue.

== Players ==
=== First-team squad ===
Note: Flags indicate national team as defined under FIFA eligibility rules; some limited exceptions apply. Players may hold more than one non-FIFA nationality.

No.	Pos.	Nation	Player
1	GK	FRA	Maxime Dupé
2	DF	BRA	Fábio
3	DF	BRA	Diego Carlos
4	DF	FRA	Nicolas Pallois
5	DF	SEN	Kara Mbodji (on loan from Anderlecht)
6	DF	BRA	Lucas Lima
7	FW	MLI	Kalifa Coulibaly
8	FW	BEL	Joris Kayembe
9	FW	ARG	Emiliano Sala
10	FW	GHA	Abdul Majeed Waris (on loan from Porto)
11	MF	SWE	Alexander Kačaniklić
12	MF	BRA	Gabriel Boschilia (on loan from Monaco)
13	DF	USA	Matt Miazga (on loan from Chelsea)
14	DF	MLI	Charles Traoré
15	FW	COD	Randal Kolo
16	GK	FRA	Alexandre Olliero

No.	Pos.	Nation	Player
17	MF	BRA	Lucas Evangelista
18	MF	FRA	Samuel Moutoussamy
19	MF	FRA	Abdoulaye Touré
20	MF	BRA	Andrei Girotto
21	MF	SLO	Rene Krhin
22	FW	BEL	Anthony Limbombe
23	MF	FRA	Abdoulaye Dabo
25	DF	FRA	Enock Kwateng
26	DF	COD	Anthony Walongwa
27	FW	SEN	Santy Ngom
28	MF	FRA	Valentin Rongier (captain)
29	DF	FRA	Batista Mendy
30	GK	ROU	Ciprian Tătărușanu
31	FW	ISL	Kolbeinn Sigþórsson
34	DF	FRA	Thomas Basila
40	GK	FRA	Quentin Braat

=== Out on loan ===
Note: Flags indicate national team as defined under FIFA eligibility rules; some limited exceptions apply. Players may hold more than one non-FIFA nationality.

No.	Pos.	Nation	Player
—	DF	CIV	Koffi Djidji (at Torino until 30 June 2019)
—	MF	CMR	Alexis Alégué (at Tours until 30 June 2019)
—	MF	BEL	Yassine El Ghanassy (at Al-Raed until 30 June 2019)

== Competitions ==
=== Ligue 1 ===
==== League table ====
Pos	Team	Pld	W	D	L	GF	GA	GD	Pts	Qualification or relegation
10	Rennes	38	13	13	12	55	52	+3	52	Qualification to Europa League group stage (Note: Rennes qualified for the Europa League group stage by winning the 2018–19 Coupe de France.)
11	Strasbourg	38	11	16	11	58	48	+10	49	Qualification to Europa League second qualifying round (Note: Strasbourg qualified for the Europa League second qualifying round by winning the 2018–19 Coupe de la Ligue.)
12	Nantes	38	13	9	16	48	48	0	48	
13	Angers	38	10	16	12	44	49	−5	46	
14	Bordeaux	38	10	11	17	34	42	−8	41	

Source: Ligue 1 and Soccerway
Rules for classification: 1) Points; 2) Goal difference; 3) Head-to-head points; 4) Head-to-head goal difference; 5) Head-to-head goals scored; 6) Head-to-head away goals scored; 7) Goals scored; 8) Away goals scored; 9) Most goals scored in single league match; 10) Fairplay ranking.

==== Results summary ====
Overall								Home						Away					
Pld	W	D	L	GF	GA	GD	Pts	W	D	L	GF	GA	GD	W	D	L	GF	GA	GD
38	13	9	16	48	48	0	48	9	4	6	35	24	+11	4	5	10	13	24	−11

Last updated: 24 May 2019.
Source: Competitive matches

==== Results by round ====
Round	1	2	3	4	5	6	7	8	9	10	11	12	13	14	15	16	17	18	19	20	21	22	23	24	25	26	27	28	29	30	31	32	33	34	35	36	37	38
Ground	H	A	H	A	H	A	H	A	A	H	A	H	A	H	A	H	A	H	A	H	A	H	A	H	A	H	A	H	A	H	A	H	H	A	H	A	A	H
Result	L	L	D	W	D	L	L	D	L	W	W	W	D	D	L	W	L	W	L	L	L	D	W	L	L	W	D	W	L	L	L	W	W	W	W	D	D	L
Position	16	20	17	16	17	18	19	19	19	18	13	10	10	10	12	12	11	11	11	13	14	14	14	14	14	14	14	14	15	15	16	14	13	12	11	10	11	12

Source: Results
A = Away; H = Home; W = Win; D = Draw; L = Loss

==== Matches ====
11 August 2018 1	Nantes	1–3	Monaco	Nantes
17:00 CEST (UTC+2)	Diego (yellow card) 74'; Sala 90+2'	Report	Lopes 69'; Jovetić 80'; Falcao 83'	Stadium: Stade de la Beaujoire; Attendance: 32,760; Referee: Jérôme Brisard

18 August 2018 2	Dijon	2–0	Nantes	Dijon
20:00 CEST (UTC+2)	Tavares 8', 74'	Report	Diego Carlos (yellow card) 43'; A. Touré (red card) 78'	Stadium: Stade Gaston Gérard; Attendance: 13,617; Referee: Jérémy Stinat

25 August 2018 3	Nantes	1–1	Caen	Nantes
20:00 CEST (UTC+2)	Coulibaly (yellow card) 5'; Waris (yellow card) 69'; Sala 80' (pen.)	Report	Baysse (yellow card) 26', (red card) 79'; Crivelli 37'; Djiku (yellow card) 73'	Stadium: Stade de la Beaujoire; Attendance: 19,674; Referee: Hakim Ben El Hadj

1 September 2018 4	Strasbourg	2–3	Nantes	Strasbourg
20:00 CEST (UTC+2)	Ajorque 21'; Martin (yellow card) 57' da Costa 81'	Report	Stefan Mitrović 34' (o.g.); Lucas Lima (yellow card) 43'; Evangelista 45+2'; Kwateng (yellow card) 57'; Sala 59'	Stadium: Stade de la Meinau; Attendance: 25,031; Referee: Olivier Thual

16 September 2018 5	Nantes	0–0	Reims	Nantes
15:00 CEST (UTC+2)	Diego (yellow card) 23'; Rongier (yellow card) 72'; Miazga (yellow card) 77'	Report	Chavarría 56'; Doumbia (yellow card) 63'; Chavalerin (yellow card) 73'; Cafaro (yellow card) 87'	Stadium: Stade de la Beaujoire; Attendance: 18,981; Referee: Eric Wattellier

22 September 2018 6	Lille	2–1	Nantes	Villeneuve-d'Ascq
17:00 CEST (UTC+2)	J. Fonte 9'; Mendes (yellow card) 17'; Ballo-Touré (yellow card) 49'; Xeka (yellow card) 63'; Ikoné 68'	Report	Diego (yellow card) 27'; Krhin (yellow card) 33'; Miazga (yellow card) 50'; Coulibaly 82', (yellow card) 90+5'	Stadium: Stade Pierre-Mauroy; Attendance: 27,353; Referee: Benoît Bastien

25 September 2018 7	Nantes	1–2	Nice	Nantes
20:00 CEST (UTC+2)	Sala 57'; Miazga (yellow card) 78'	Report	Jallet 31'; Lees-Melou (yellow card) 36'; Coly (yellow card) 52'; Makengo 69'	Stadium: Stade de la Beaujoire; Attendance: 16,604; Referee: Mikael Lesage

29 September 2018 8	Lyon	1–1	Nantes	Décines-Charpieu
20:00 CEST (UTC+2)	Aouar 22'; Morel (yellow card) 29'; Diop (yellow card) 34'; Fekir (yellow card) 87'	Report	Lucas Lima (yellow card) 16'; Boschilia 62'; Tătărușanu (yellow card) 75'; Miazga (yellow card) 78'; Fàbio (yellow card) 90+2'	Stadium: Parc Olympique Lyonnais; Attendance: 50,319; Referee: Frank Schneider

7 October 2018 9	Bordeaux	3–0	Nantes	Bordeaux
15:00 CEST (UTC+2)	Karamoh 5'; Kamano 7', 42' (pen.); Kalu (yellow card) 82'	Report	Miazga (yellow card) 41'	Stadium: Matmut Atlantique; Attendance: 18,307; Referee: François Letexier

20 October 2018 10	Nantes	4–0	Toulouse	Nantes
20:00 CEST (UTC+2)	Sala 25', 71' (77.); Boschilia 38'; Rongier (yellow card) 45+1'; Lucas Lima (yellow card) 51'; Limbombe (yellow card) 66'	Report	Mbia (yellow card) 38'	Stadium: Stade de la Beaujoire; Attendance: 22,613; Referee: Benoît Bastien

27 October 2018 11	Amiens	1–2	Nantes	Amiens
20:00 CEST (UTC+2)	Adénon (yellow card) 36'; Bodmer 81'	Report	Boschilia 16', (yellow card) 30'; Kwateng (yellow card) 20'; Sala 71'	Stadium: Stade de la Licorne; Attendance: 11,384; Referee: Jérémy Stinat

4 November 2018 12	Nantes	5–0	Guingamp	Nantes
15:00 CET (UTC+1)	Sala 43' (pen.), 84'; Rongier 63'; A. Touré 70'; Girotto 78'	Report	Blas (yellow card) 32'; Traoré (yellow card) 41'	Stadium: Stade de la Beaujoire; Attendance: 25,753; Referee: Jérôme Brisard

11 November 2018 13	Rennes	1–1	Nantes	Rennes
17:00 CET (UTC+1)	Johansson 8'; Zeffane (yellow card) 51'; André (yellow card) 53'; Bensebaini (yellow card) 59'; Grenier (yellow card) 64'	Report	A. Touré (yellow card) 7'; Sala 16'; Kwateng (yellow card) 21'; Diego (yellow card) 56'	Stadium: Roazhon Park; Attendance: 23,270; Referee: Karim Abed

24 November 2018 14	Nantes	1–1	Angers	Nantes
20:00 CET (UTC+1)	Limbombe (yellow card) 23'; Waris (yellow card) 85', (goal) 89'	Report	Bahoken 5', (yellow card) 36'; Santamaria (yellow card) 25'; Pavlović (yellow card) 72'	Stadium: Stade de la Beaujoire; Attendance: 23,682; Referee: Clément Turpin

30 November 2018 15	Saint-Étienne	3–0	Nantes	Saint-Étienne
20:45 CET (UTC+1)	Cabella (yellow card) 60'; Berić 72'; Khazri 84'; Kolodziejczak 90'	Report	Pallois (yellow card) 20'; Lucas Lima (yellow card) 82'	Stadium: Stade Geoffroy-Guichard; Attendance: 21,884; Referee: Jérôme Brisard

5 December 2018 16	Nantes	3–2	Marseille	Nantes
19:00 CET (UTC+1)	Sala 30'; Touré 45+1'; Boschilia 63'	Report	Strootman (yellow card) 15'; Sanson 28'; Thauvin 36' (pen.)	Stadium: Stade de la Beaujoire; Attendance: 32,663; Referee: François Letexier

8 December 2018 17	Nîmes	Postponed	Nantes	Nîmes
19:00 CET (UTC+1)				Stadium: Stade des Costières

15 December 2018 18	Nantes	Postponed	Montpellier	Nantes
19:00 CET (UTC+1)				Stadium: Stade de la Beaujoire

22 December 2018 19	Paris Saint-Germain	1–0	Nantes	Paris
21:00 CET (UTC+1)	Mbappé 68'; Thiago Silva (yellow card) 88'; Marquinhos (yellow card) 90+4'	Report		Stadium: Parc des Princes; Attendance: 47,511; Referee: Karim Abed

8 January 2019 18	Nantes	2–0	Montpellier	Nantes
19:00 CET (UTC+1)	Waris 62'; Touré (yellow card) 64'; Pallois 81'	Report	Mendes (yellow card) 11'; Laborde (red card) 19'; Lasne (yellow card) 88'	Stadium: Stade de la Beaujoire; Attendance: 15,780; Referee: Willy Delajod
Note: The match, originally scheduled for 15 December 2018, was postponed due to security concerns as a result of the yellow vests movement.

13 January 2019 20	Nantes	0–1	Rennes	Nantes
15:00 CET (UTC+1)	Girotto (yellow card) 38'; Pallois (yellow card) 85'; Lucas Lima (yellow card) 90'; Waris (yellow card) 90+1'; Fábio (yellow card) 90+1'	Report	Da Silva 13'; André (yellow card) 32'; Grenier (yellow card) 45'; Niang (yellow card) 52'	Stadium: Stade de la Beaujoire; Attendance: 31,195; Referee: Ruddy Buquet

16 January 2019 17	Nîmes	1–0	Nantes	Nîmes
19:00 CET (UTC+1)	Alakouch 64'; Depres (yellow card) 86'	Report	Coulibaly (yellow card) 2' (red card) 45+2'; Pallois (yellow card) 77'; Diego (yellow card) 90+3'	Stadium: Stade des Costières; Attendance: 12,806; Referee: Hakim Ben El Hadj
Note: The match, originally scheduled for 8 December 2018, was postponed due to security concerns as a result of the yellow vests movement.

20 January 2019 21	Angers	1–0	Nantes	Angers
17:00 CET (UTC+1)	N'Doye (yellow card) 49'; Pavlović (yellow card) 82'; Fulgini 90+4'	Report	Girotto (yellow card) 73'; Lucas Lima (yellow card) 78'; Kolo (yellow card) 83'	Stadium: Stade Raymond Kopa; Attendance: 12,412; Referee: Benoît Millot

30 January 2019 22	Nantes	1–1	Saint-Étienne	Nantes
21:00 CET (UTC+1)	Diego (yellow card) 45'; Fábio (red card) 45+3'; Waris 70'; Coulibaly (yellow card) 82'	Report	Monnet-Paquet (yellow card) 30'; M'Vila (red card) 45+3'; Cabella 58'	Stadium: Stade de la Beaujoire; Attendance: 28,748; Referee: Frank Schneider

10 February 2019 24	Nantes	2–4	Nîmes	Nantes
15:00 CET (UTC+1)	Coulibaly 15'; Girotto (yellow card) 31'; Waris 38' (pen.)	Report	Guillaume (yellow card) 9', (goal) 48'; Lybohy (yellow card) 36'; Bobichon 69'; Ferri 85'; Thioub 89'	Stadium: Stade de la Beaujoire; Attendance: 34,219; Referee: Clément Turpin

13 February 2019 23	Caen	0–1	Nantes	Caen
19:00 CET (UTC+1)	Guilbert (yellow card) 55'; Diomandé (yellow card) 59'; Armougom (yellow card) 71'; Djiku (yellow card) 78'	Report	Girotto (yellow card) 26' (yellow-red card) 34'; Pallois (yellow card) 34'; Rongier 80' (pen.)	Stadium: Stade Michel d'Ornano; Attendance: 16,627; Referee: Willy Delajod

16 February 2019 25	Monaco	1–0	Nantes	Monaco
20:00 CET (UTC+01:00)	Martins 13'; B. Badiashile (yellow card) 25'; Lopes (yellow card) 44'; Golovin (yellow card) 52'; Silva (yellow card) 90+5'	Report	Krhin (yellow card) 73'; Mance (yellow card) 79'	Stadium: Stade Louis II; Attendance: 7,557; Referee: Olivier Thual

24 February 2019 26	Nantes	1–0	Bordeaux	Nantes
15:00 CET (UTC+1)	Ié (yellow card) 17'; Pallois 51'; Kwateng (yellow card) 75'	Report	Poundjé (yellow card) 73'; Koundé (yellow card) 83'	Stadium: Stade de la Beaujoire; Attendance: 21,910; Referee: Antony Gautier

3 March 2019 27	Guingamp	0–0	Nantes	Guingamp
15:00 CET (UTC+1)	Eboa Eboa (yellow card) 90+4'	Report	Pallois (yellow card) 45'; Traoré (yellow card) 85'	Stadium: Stade de Roudourou; Attendance: 15,025; Referee: Ruddy Buquet

9 March 2019 28	Nantes	Postponed	Paris Saint-Germain	Nantes
15:00 CET (UTC+1)				Stadium: Stade de la Beaujoire
Note: Match postponed at the request of the Prefecture of Loire-Atlantique.

17 March 2019 29	Reims	1–0	Nantes	Reims
15:00 CET (UTC+1)	Rahman (yellow card) 40'; Oudin 59'; Dingomé (yellow card) 61'; Doumbia (yellow card) 86'; Chavarría (yellow card) 90+2'	Report	Fábio (yellow card) 37'; Girotto (yellow card) 78' (yellow-red card) 89'	Stadium: Stade Auguste Delaune; Attendance: 14,806; Referee: Johan Hamel

31 March 2019 30	Nantes	2–3	Lille	Nantes
17:00 CEST (UTC+2)	Eysseric 54' (pen.), (yellow card) 72'; Coulibaly 56'; Pallois (yellow card) 75'	Report	Pépé (yellow card) 5', (goal) 68' (pen.); Mendes (yellow card) 53'; Leão 62', (yellow card) 74'; Bamba 69'	Stadium: Stade de la Beaujoire; Attendance: 25,045; Referee: Willy Delajod

7 April 2019 31	Toulouse	1–0	Nantes	Toulouse
15:00 CEST (UTC+2)	Jullien (yellow card) 21'; Shoji (yellow card) 34'; Amian (yellow card) 40'; Sylla 55'	Report	Girotto (red card) 18'; Ié (yellow card) 24'	Stadium: Stadium Municipal; Attendance: 16,264; Referee: Florent Batta

12 April 2019 32	Nantes	2–1	Lyon	Nantes
20:45 CEST (UTC+2)	Coulibaly 11', (yellow card) 78'; Rongier (yellow card) 16'; Limbombe 83'	Report	Terrier 41'; Denayer (yellow card) 78'	Stadium: Stade de la Beaujoire; Attendance: 25,050; Referee: Jérôme Brisard

17 April 2019 28	Nantes	3–2	Paris Saint-Germain	Nantes
19:00 CEST (UTC+2)	Diego 22'; Waris 44'; Dani Alves 52' (o.g.); Dupé (yellow card) 90+3'	Report	Dani Alves 19'; Kimpembe (yellow card) 55'; Draxler (yellow card) 73'; Dagba (yellow card) 79'; Güçlü 89'	Stadium: Stade de la Beaujoire; Attendance: 34,471; Referee: Antony Gautier

21 April 2019 33	Nantes	3–2	Amiens	Nantes
15:00 CEST (UTC+2)	Pallois (yellow card) 25'; Coulibaly 49', 55'; Rongier 59'; Touré (yellow card) 87'	Report	Pieters (yellow card) 4'; Otero 62'; Blin (yellow card) 69'; Mendoza (yellow card) 69'; Timité 77'	Stadium: Stade de la Beaujoire; Attendance: 19,253; Referee: Thomas Leonard

28 April 2019 34	Marseille	1–2	Nantes	Marseille
21:00 CEST (UTC+2)	Ocampos (yellow card) 17'; Balotelli 25', (yellow card) 41'; Payet (yellow card) 32'; Luiz Gustavo (yellow card) 45+2'	Report	Moutoussamy 22'; Traoré (yellow card) 42'; Girotto 50'	Stadium: Stade Vélodrome; Attendance: 51,969; Referee: Johan Hamel

5 May 2019 35	Nantes	3–0	Dijon	Nantes
15:00 CEST (UTC+2)	Touré 51'; Coulibaly 74' (pen.); Rongier 80'	Report	Aguerd (yellow card) 71', (red card) 73'; Amalfitano (yellow card) 71'	Stadium: Stade de la Beaujoire; Attendance: 19,482; Referee: Benoît Bastien

11 May 2019 36	Nice	1–1	Nantes	Nice
20:00 CEST (UTC+2)	Sarr 56'; Atal (yellow card) 81'; Srarfi (yellow card) 86'	Report	Moutoussamy 29'; Fábio (yellow card) 49'; Girotto (yellow card) 62'; Traoré (yellow card) 78'	Stadium: Allianz Riviera; Attendance: 16,372; Referee: Stéphanie Frappart

18 May 2019 37	Montpellier	1–1	Nantes	Montpellier
21:00 CEST (UTC+2)	Mollet 76'	Report	Diego Carlos (yellow card) 2'; Coulibaly 24'; Touré (yellow card) 29'; Pallois (yellow card) 90+6'	Stadium: Stade de la Mosson; Attendance: 16,063; Referee: Ruddy Buquet

24 May 2019 38	Nantes	0–1	Strasbourg	Nantes
21:05 CEST (UTC+2)	Coulibaly (yellow card) 78'; Louza (yellow card) 87'	Report	Sissoko (yellow card) 28'; Mothiba 60' (pen.)	Stadium: Stade de la Beaujoire; Attendance: 30,636; Referee: Karim Abed

=== Coupe de la Ligue ===
30 October 2018 Round of 32	Montpellier	0–3	Nantes	Montpellier
18:45 CET (UTC+1)	Cozza (yellow card) 42'; Pedro Mendes (red card) 74'	Report	Waris (yellow card) 24', (goal) 80'; Evangelist (yellow card) 35'; Coulibaly 58'; Girotto (yellow card) 74'; Rongier (yellow card) 84'; Sala 90+4'	Stadium: Stade de la Mosson; Attendance: 6,774; Referee: Olivier Thual

19 December 2018 Round of 16	Rennes	2–1	Nantes	Rennes
21:05 CET (UTC+1)	Traoré (yellow card) 51'; Bourigeaud (yellow card) 55'; Mexer 60'; Da Silva 89'	Report	Waris (yellow card) 26', (goal) 49'; Kwateng (yellow card) 43'	Stadium: Roazhon Park; Attendance: 19,435; Referee: Benoît Bastien

=== Coupe de France ===
4 January 2019 Round of 64	Nantes	4–1	Châteauroux	Nantes
20:55 CET (UTC+1)	Coulibaly 6'; Khrin 37'; Louza 70'; Limbombe 86'	Report	Sanganté 13'	Stadium: Stade de la Beaujoire; Attendance: 10,514; Referee: Jérémy Stinat

2 February 2019 Round of 32	L'Entente SSG	0–1	Nantes	Saint-Gratien
18:30 CET (UTC+1)	Ba (yellow card) 82'; Géran (yellow card) 90+3'	Report	Coulibaly 73'; Pallois (yellow card) 90+3'	Stadium: Parc des Sports Michel Hidalgo; Attendance: 5,000; Referee: Mikael Lesage

5 February 2019 Round of 16	Nantes	2–0	Toulouse	Nantes
18:30 CET (UTC+1)	Coulibaly 8'; Limbombe 41'	Report	Sidibé (yellow card) 38'	Stadium: Stade de la Beaujoire; Attendance: 9,141; Referee: Jérôme Miguelgorry

6 March 2019 Quarter-finals	AS Vitré	0–2	Nantes	Laval
18:30 CET (UTC+1)	Sorin (yellow card) 27'	Report	Boschilia 25'; Mance 44'	Stadium: Stade Francis Le Basser; Attendance: 11,086; Referee: Karim Abed

3 April 2019 Semi-finals	Paris Saint-Germain	3–0	Nantes	Paris
21:00 CEST (UTC+2)	Verratti 29', (yellow card) 69'; Mbappé 85' (pen.); Bernat (yellow card) 87'; Dani Alves 90+2'	Report	Coulibaly (yellow card) 54' (yellow-red card) 72'; Waris (yellow card) 64'; Fábio (yellow card) 65'; Diego (yellow card) 84'	Stadium: Parc des Princes; Attendance: 45,000; Referee: François Letexier

== Statistics ==
=== Appearances and goals ===
No.	Pos	Nat	Player	Total		Ligue 1		Coupe de France		Coupe de la Ligue	
No.	Pos	Nat	Player	Apps	Goals	Apps	Goals	Apps	Goals	Apps	Goals
Goalkeepers
1	GK	(France) FRA	Maxime Dupé	15	0	10+1	0	3	0	1	0
16	GK	(France) FRA	Alexandre Olliero	1	0	1	0	0	0	0	0
30	GK	(Romania) ROU	Ciprian Tătărușanu	30	0	27	0	2	0	1	0
40	GK	(France) FRA	Quentin Braat	0	0	0	0	0	0	0	0
Defenders
2	DF	(Brazil) BRA	Fábio	25	0	15+5	0	3	0	2	0
3	DF	(Brazil) BRA	Diego Carlos	40	1	35	1	2+1	0	2	0
4	DF	(France) FRA	Nicolas Pallois	32	2	25	2	5	0	2	0
5	DF	(Portugal) POR	Edgar Ié	11	0	9	0	2	0	0	0
6	DF	(Brazil) BRA	Lucas Lima	36	0	28+3	0	4	0	1	0
14	DF	(Mali) MLI	Charles Traoré	16	0	13	0	2	0	1	0
25	DF	(France) FRA	Enock Kwateng	33	0	22+8	0	2	0	1	0
26	DF	(Democratic Republic of the Congo) COD	Anthony Walongwa	1	0	1	0	0	0	0	0
29	DF	(France) FRA	Batista Mendy	0	0	0	0	0	0	0	0
34	DF	(France) FRA	Thomas Basila	2	0	1+1	0	0	0	0	0
Midfielders
11	MF	(France) FRA	Valentin Eysseric	7	1	3+2	1	1+1	0	0	0
12	MF	(Brazil) BRA	Gabriel Boschilia	32	5	14+15	4	2	1	0+1	0
17	MF	(Brazil) BRA	Lucas Evangelista	19	1	9+5	1	3+1	0	1	0
18	MF	(France) FRA	Samuel Moutoussamy	31	2	19+9	2	0+3	0	0	0
19	MF	(France) FRA	Abdoulaye Touré	41	3	30+4	3	3+2	0	1+1	0
20	MF	(Brazil) BRA	Andrei Girotto	25	2	18+2	2	3	0	2	0
21	MF	(Slovenia) SLO	Rene Krhin	21	1	12+4	0	2+1	1	1+1	0
23	MF	(France) FRA	Abdoulaye Dabo	2	0	2	0	0	0	0	0
28	MF	(France) FRA	Valentin Rongier	43	4	36	4	3+2	0	1+1	0
33	MF	(France) FRA	Imran Louza	3	1	1	0	2	1	0	0
Forwards
7	FW	(Mali) MLI	Kalifa Coulibaly	39	12	19+13	8	4+1	3	1+1	1
8	FW	(Belgium) BEL	Joris Kayembe	0	0	0	0	0	0	0	0
10	FW	(Ghana) GHA	Abdul Majeed Waris	38	7	25+8	5	1+2	0	2	2
15	FW	(Democratic Republic of the Congo) COD	Randal Kolo	6	0	1+5	0	0	0	0	0
22	FW	(Belgium) BEL	Anthony Limbombe	33	3	12+17	1	3+1	2	0	0
Players transferred out during the season
5	DF	(Senegal) SEN	Kara Mbodji	8	0	6	0	1	0	1	0
5	DF	(Ivory Coast) CIV	Koffi Djidji	1	0	1	0	0	0	0	0
13	DF	(United States) USA	Matt Miazga	9	0	8	0	1	0	0	0
24	DF	(Cameroon) CMR	Alexis Alégué	1	0	0+1	0	0	0	0	0
11	MF	(Sweden) SWE	Alexander Kačaniklić	0	0	0	0	0	0	0	0
9	FW	(Argentina) ARG	Emiliano Sala (died in 2019 English Channel Piper PA-46 crash)	21	13	16+3	12	0	0	1+1	1
27	FW	(Croatia) CRO	Antonio Mance	6	1	0+5	0	1	1	0	0
27	FW	(Senegal) SEN	Santy Ngom	0	0	0	0	0	0	0	0
34	FW	(France) FRA	Elie Youan	1	0	0+1	0	0	0	0	0
31	FW	(Iceland) ISL	Kolbeinn Sigþórsson	0	0	0	0	0	0	0	0

Last updated: 24 May 2019
Source: Competitions
