= Alexandre Olliero =

French footballer (born 1996)

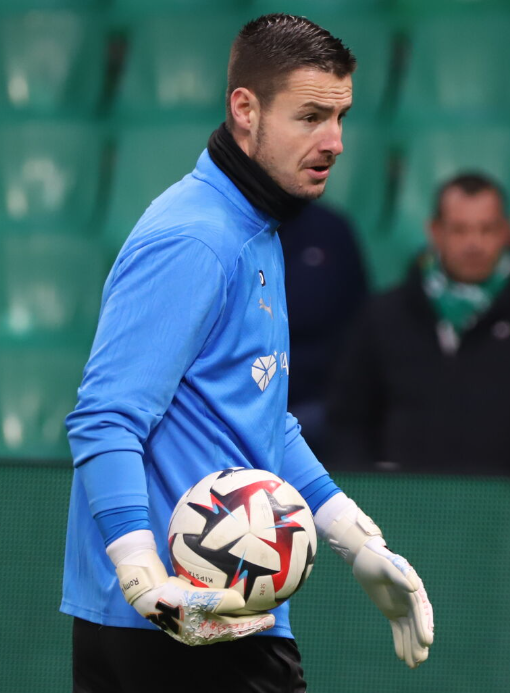
- Olliero with Reims in 2025

Personal information
- Date of birth: 15 February 1996 (age 30)
- Place of birth: La Rochelle, France
- Height: 1.93 m (6 ft 4 in)
- Position: Goalkeeper

Team information
- Current team: Grenoble
- Number: 1

Youth career
- 2000–2013: ES La Rochelle
- 2013–2016: Nantes

Senior career*
Years	Team	Apps	(Gls)
2014–2020	Nantes II	56	(0)
2016–2021	Nantes	1	(0)
2018	→ Chamois Niortais (loan)	14	(0)
2020–2021	→ Pau FC (loan)	36	(0)
2021–2023	Pau FC	42	(0)
2023–2026	Reims	0	(0)
2024	Reims B	1	(0)
2026–	Grenoble	0	(0)
- * Club domestic league appearances and goals as of 9 May 2026

Alexandre Olliero (born 15 February 1996) is a French professional footballer who plays as a goalkeeper for Ligue 2 club Grenoble.

== Career ==
Olliero signed with FC Nantes in 2013 from his native ES La Rochelle where he started playing football at the age of 4. He extended his professional contract with Nantes on 17 October 2017 for five years, keeping him at the club until June 2023.

On 3 January 2018, Olliero joined Niort on loan in the Ligue 2 for the second half of the 2017–18 season. He made his professional debut for Niort in a 0–0 Ligue 2 tie with AS Nancy on 12 January 2018.

In July 2020, Olliero again left Nantes on loan, joining Pau FC, newly promoted to Ligue 2, for the 2020–21 season.

On 1 February 2023, Olliero signed with Ligue 1 club Reims for a 4 years contract. In three-and-a-half years with Reims, Olliero made no appearances in league games, playing 9 games in Coupe de France.

On 24 March 2026, Olliero signed a three-season contract with Grenoble, beginning in the 2026–27 season.

== Career statistics ==
As of match played 3 March 2026

Appearances and goals by club, season and competition
Club	Season	League			Cup		League Cup		Other		Total	
Club	Season	Division	Apps	Goals	Apps	Goals	Apps	Goals	Apps	Goals	Apps	Goals
Nantes II	2014–15	CFA	4	0	—		—		—		4	0
Nantes II	2015–16	CFA	18	0	—		—		—		18	0
Nantes II	2016–17	CFA	19	0	—		—		—		19	0
Nantes II	2017–18	Championnat National 3	6	0	—		—		—		6	0
Nantes II	2018–19	Championnat National 2	6	0	—		—		—		6	0
Nantes II	2019–20	Championnat National 2	3	0	—		—		—		3	0
Nantes II	Total		56	0	—		—		—		56	0
Nantes	2015–16	Ligue 1	0	0	0	0	0	0	—		0	0
Nantes	2016–17	Ligue 1	0	0	0	0	0	0	—		0	0
Nantes	2017–18	Ligue 1	0	0	—		0	0	—		0	0
Nantes	2018–19	Ligue 1	1	0	0	0	0	0	—		1	0
Nantes	2019–20	Ligue 1	0	0	0	0	2	0	—		2	0
Nantes	Total		1	0	0	0	2	0	—		3	0
Chamois Niortais (loan)	2017–18	Ligue 2	14	0	0	0	—		—		14	0
Pau FC (loan)	2020–21	Ligue 2	36	0	0	0	—		—		36	0
Pau FC	2021–22	Ligue 2	22	0	1	0	—		—		23	0
Pau FC	2022–23	Ligue 2	20	0	1	0	—		—		21	0
Pau FC	Pau total		78	0	2	0	—		—		80	0
Reims	2022–23	Ligue 1	0	0	0	0	—		—		0	0
Reims	2023–24	Ligue 1	0	0	2	0	—		—		2	0
Reims	2024–25	Ligue 1	0	0	1	0	—		0	0	1	0
Reims	2025–26	Ligue 2	0	0	6	0	—		—		6	0
Reims	Total		0	0	9	0	—		0	0	9	0
Career total			149	0	11	0	2	0	0	0	162	0

== Honours ==
Reims

- Coupe de France runner-up: 2024–25
