= Koffi Djidji =

Ivorian footballer (born 1992)

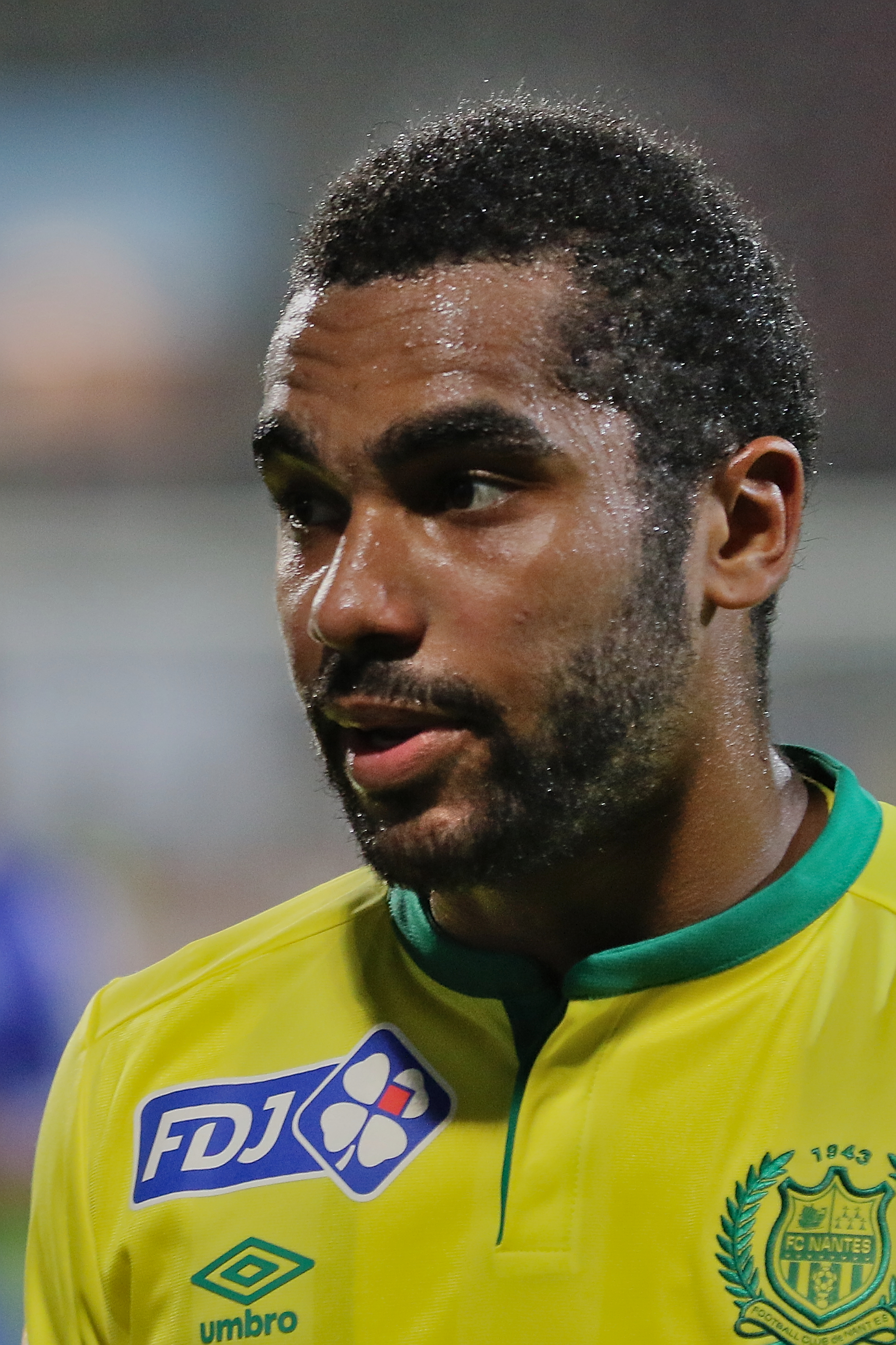
- Djidji with Nantes in 2015

Personal information
- Full name: Lévy Koffi Djidji
- Date of birth: 30 November 1992 (age 33)
- Place of birth: Bagnolet, France
- Height: 1.84 m (6 ft 0 in)
- Position: Defender

Team information
- Current team: Livorno
- Number: 6

Youth career
- –2005: AJN Bagnolet
- 2006–2007: Saint-Herblain Olympique Club
- 2007–2011: Nantes

Senior career*
| Years | Team | Apps | (Gls) |
| 2011–2019 | Nantes | 98 | (1) |
| 2012–2016 | Nantes B | 31 | (2) |
| 2018–2019 | → Torino (loan) | 17 | (0) |
| 2019–2024 | Torino | 89 | (2) |
| 2020–2021 | → Crotone (loan) | 20 | (1) |
| 2026– | Livorno | 2 | (0) |
- * Club domestic league appearances and goals as of 29 August 2026

Lévy Koffi Djidji (born 30 November 1992) is a professional footballer who plays as a defender for Serie C Group B club Livorno. Born in France, Djidji plays for the Ivory Coast national team.

== Club career ==
Born in Bagnolet, Djidji started his career in the youth team of his hometown club AJN Bagnolet. In the spring of 2006, he left his hometown and signed with Saint-Herblain Olympique Club.

In summer 2007, at the age of fifteen, he moved to the under-18 team of Ligue 1 side FC Nantes, being promoted to the reserve team one year later for the 2008–09 season. He played in his first three years for the reserve team in ten games in the CFA 2 Groupe G.

On 4 August 2012, he played his senior debut in the Ligue 2 for Nantes against Nimes Olympique. He scored his first goal in Ligue 1 against Montpellier on 22 March 2014, in a 2–1 win for Nantes over Montpellier.

On 17 August 2018, Djidji joined the Italian Serie A club Torino on loan with an option to buy.

On 5 October 2020, Djidji joined Crotone on loan.

== International career ==
Djidji was born and raised in France to an Ivorian father and a French mother. He received a call-up to the Ivory national team for their friendly 0–0 tie against Hungary.

== Career statistics ==
=== Club ===
As of match played 23 August 2023

Appearances and goals by club, season and competition
| Club | Season | League | | | National Cup (Note: Includes Coupe de France, Coppa Italia) | | League Cup (Note: Includes Coupe de la Ligue) | | Europe | | Other | | Total | |
| Club | Season | Division | Apps | Goals | Apps | Goals | Apps | Goals | Apps | Goals | Apps | Goals | Apps | Goals |
|---|---|---|---|---|---|---|---|---|---|---|---|---|---|---|
| Nantes | 2012–13 | Ligue 2 | 4 | 0 | 0 | 0 | 1 | 0 | — | | — | | 5 | 0 |
| Nantes | 2013–14 | Ligue 1 | 10 | 1 | 0 | 0 | 2 | 0 | — | | — | | 12 | 1 |
| Nantes | 2014–15 | Ligue 1 | 5 | 0 | 2 | 0 | 0 | 0 | — | | — | | 7 | 0 |
| Nantes | 2015–16 | Ligue 1 | 22 | 0 | 3 | 0 | 1 | 0 | — | | — | | 26 | 0 |
| Nantes | 2016–17 | Ligue 1 | 28 | 0 | 0 | 0 | 2 | 0 | — | | — | | 30 | 0 |
| Nantes | 2017–18 | Ligue 1 | 29 | 0 | 2 | 0 | 0 | 0 | — | | — | | 31 | 0 |
| Nantes | 2018–19 | Ligue 1 | 1 | 0 | 0 | 0 | 0 | 0 | — | | — | | 1 | 0 |
| Nantes | Total | | 99 | 1 | 7 | 0 | 6 | 0 | — | | — | | 112 | 1 |
| Torino | 2018–19 | Serie A | 17 | 0 | 1 | 0 | — | | — | | — | | 18 | 0 |
| Torino | 2019–20 | Serie A | 17 | 0 | 2 | 0 | — | | — | | — | | 19 | 0 |
| Torino | 2021–22 | Serie A | 25 | 0 | 1 | 0 | — | | — | | — | | 26 | 0 |
| Torino | 2022–23 | Serie A | 34 | 1 | 2 | 0 | — | | — | | — | | 36 | 1 |
| Torino | Total | | 93 | 1 | 6 | 0 | — | | — | | — | | 99 | 1 |
| Crotone (loan) | 2020–21 | Serie A | 20 | 1 | 0 | 0 | — | | — | | — | | 20 | 1 |
| Career total | | | 212 | 3 | 13 | 0 | 6 | 0 | — | | — | | 231 | 3 |
