= Kolbeinn Sigþórsson =

Icelandic footballer (born 1990)

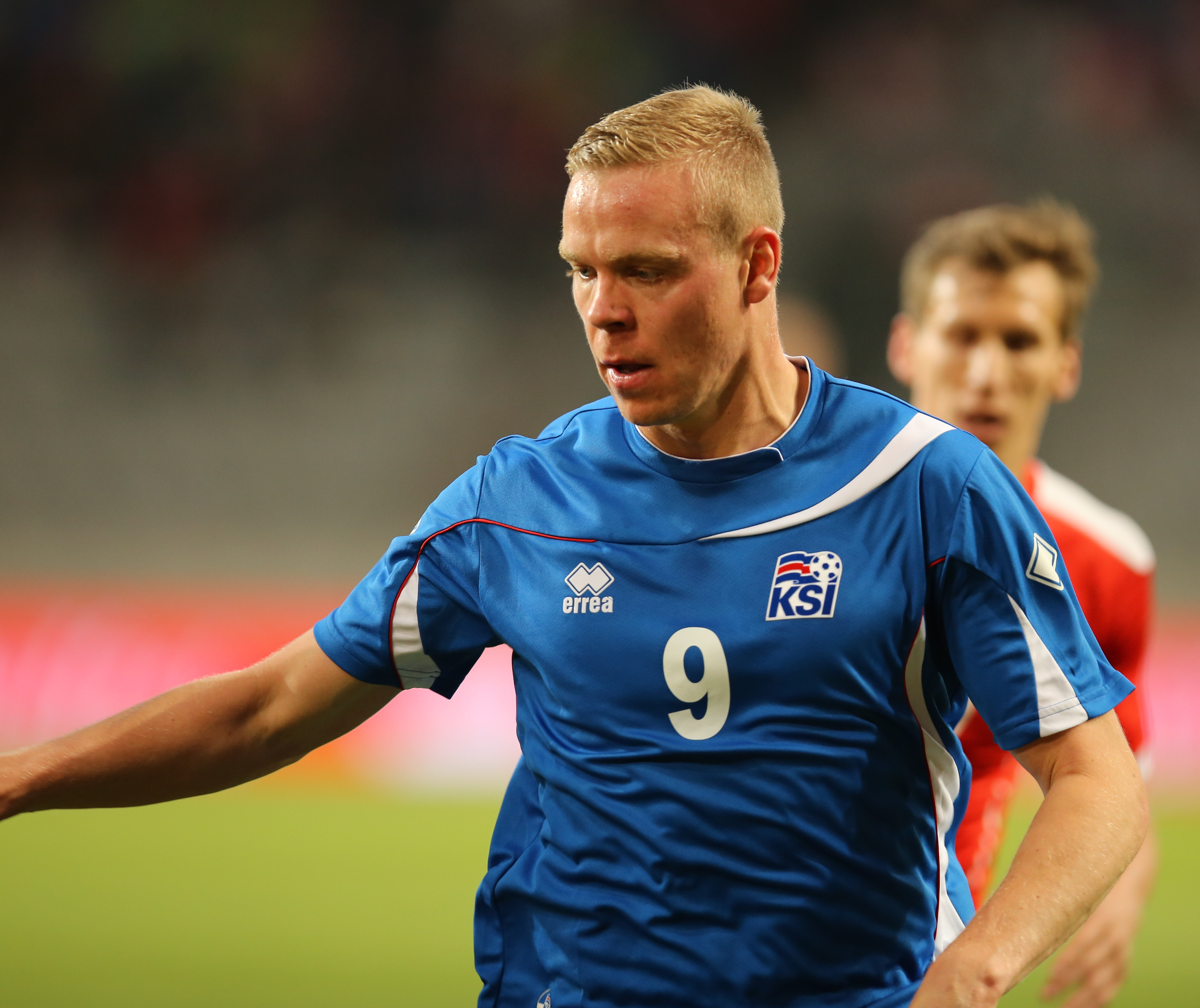
- Kolbeinn playing for Iceland in 2014

Personal information
- Date of birth: 14 March 1990 (age 36)
- Place of birth: Reykjavík, Iceland
- Height: 1.86 m (6 ft 1 in)
- Position: Forward

Youth career
- 1996–2006: Víkingur
- 2006–2007: HK
- 2007–2010: AZ

Senior career*
Years	Team	Apps	(Gls)
2006–2007	HK	5	(1)
2010–2011	AZ	32	(15)
2011–2015	Ajax	80	(31)
2015	→ Jong Ajax	1	(0)
2015–2019	Nantes	30	(3)
2016	→ Galatasaray (loan)	0	(0)
2018	→ Nantes B	2	(2)
2019–2020	AIK	35	(3)
2021	IFK Göteborg	17	(4)
Total		202	(59)

International career
2006–2007	Iceland U17	12	(7)
2009	Iceland U19	2	(0)
2007–2011	Iceland U21	16	(4)
2010–2021	Iceland	64	(26)
- * Club domestic league appearances and goals

Kolbeinn Sigþórsson (Icelandic pronunciation: [ˈkʰɔlpei̯tn̥ ˈsɪxθou̯r̥sɔn]; born 14 March 1990) is an Icelandic former professional footballer who played as a forward.

Kolbeinn came through Víkingur Reykjavik's youth program and made his professional debut with HK Kópavogur at 16 years of age. In 2007, he moved to the Netherlands to continue his development with AZ Alkmaar. A successful debut season in the Eredivisie prompted a transfer to Ajax in 2011, where he became a first team regular. In 2015, he joined Nantes in Ligue 1; injuries, however, hindered his spell at the club, which included a brief loan to Galatasaray in 2016. After a period in Sweden, playing for AIK and IFK Göteborg, he retired from football in 2021.

For the Iceland national team, Kolbeinn made 64 appearances and scored 26 goals between 2010 and 2021. He was a member of the UEFA Euro 2016 team. As a youth, he had also previously appeared at under-17, under-19 and under-21 levels.

== Club career ==
=== Víkingur ===
Kolbeinn began his career in Iceland with Víkingur, where he came through the academy, before deciding to move over to HK's youth team for a brief spell in March 2006 three days before he turned 16.

=== HK ===
Joining HK, he made his senior debut in the 2006 season. He would go on to play five league matches for the club, scoring one goal. He soon attracted the interest from top European clubs like Real Madrid and Arsenal, having two trials with the London-based club, before finally deciding to move to AZ.

=== AZ ===
After joining AZ in March 2007, he initially played in various youth teams before finally joining the first team squad in July 2010, after struggling with injuries. He made his professional debut for AZ on 5 August 2010 in a UEFA Europa League qualification match against IFK Göteborg. He scored his first goal for the club on 29 August 2010 in a match against Excelsior. On 29 January 2011, he scored a hat-trick in the first half in a match against VVV-Venlo, going on to score five goals in the match. As he kept scoring goals in subsequent matches, AZ tried to extend the player's contract, but the player was not interested. After courting interest from Borussia Dortmund and Newcastle United, Dutch giants Ajax moved in for the player with a €2 million bid. The player soon agreed on personal terms with Ajax, but the clubs could not agree on a fee for several weeks.

=== Ajax ===
On 4 July 2011, it was announced that the clubs had agreed a fee of €4.5 million and the player signed a contract with the AFC Ajax. In an interview, Kolbeinn stated that it was a dream come true to work with Dennis Bergkamp and Frank de Boer. He scored his first goal for the club in a pre-season friendly against Brøndby IF, scoring with a header in the 38th minute. On 30 July 2011, he made his first appearance in a competitive match for Ajax, as the team lost the Johan Cruyff Shield 2–1 to Twente. On 14 August 2011, Kolbeinn scored his first league goal for Ajax in a 5–1 victory over Heerenveen at the Amsterdam Arena. He scored another goal against VVV Venlo the following week, and two more goals against Vitesse, taking his tally to 4 goals in 4 league matches. In October 2011, Kolbeinn fractured his ankle and was ruled out for the rest of the season. However, on 12 March 2012, he trained for the first time in about five months without complications. He made his return to the Ajax side on 1 April 2012, coming off the bench to score the last goal in a 6–0 win over Heracles Almelo. That season, he also suffered a dislocated shoulder.

=== Nantes ===
On 2 July 2015, it was announced that Kolbeinn had signed a five-year contract with French Ligue 1 side FC Nantes, with Ajax receiving a €3.5 million transfer fee in the deal. He was presented by his new club the same day, and given the number 9 shirt for the 2015–16 Ligue 1 season.

==== Galatasaray (loan) ====
On 30 August 2016, Kolbeinn joined Galatasaray on season-long loan deal, with a €3.8 million clause to buy him on a permanent basis. On 29 December 2016, Galatasaray cancelled his loan.

==== Return to Nantes ====
Kolbeinn declined a move to IFK Gothenburg in the 2018 January transfer window over fears the artificial pitches in Sweden could cause more impact damage to his knee.

He made his playing comeback for the FC Nantes reserves in March 2018.

Nantes announced on 8 March 2019 that Kolbeinn's contract had been terminated.

=== AIK ===
On 31 March 2019, Kolbeinn joined Swedish club AIK, signing a contract valid until 31 December 2021.

=== IFK Göteborg ===
On 27 January 2021, it was announced that Kolbeinn had signed with IFK Göteborg, remaining in the Swedish competition. Following a promising start making him a key player for the club, but following the news of him being involved in a sexual assault saw him being suspended from the team for the time being, the club later announced that he would remain and continue to play with the club, however due to injury in the foot he ended up missing the rest of the season. On 7 December 2021, the club announced that he would leave the club as his contract came to an end.

== International career ==
After representing Iceland on various youth levels, Kolbeinn made his debut for the Iceland national team in a friendly against the Faroe Islands on 21 March 2010 scoring the second goal in the 37th minute of the 2–0 home win. His first appearance in a competitive match for Iceland came on 7 September 2010 in a Euro 2012 qualification match against Denmark losing to the opposition in a 1–0 away match. His first goal in a competitive match came on 6 September 2011 in a Euro 2012 qualification match against Cyprus, finding the back of the net in the fifth minute for the only goal in the 1–0 home win. On 27 May, he scored the second goal giving Iceland a 2–0 advantage over France but Iceland went on to lose the match 3–2. Kolbeinn captained the side on 6 February 2013 in a friendly against Russia, held in Marbella, Spain, where Iceland lost 2–0. After the match national coach Lars Lagerbäck said Kolbeinn would likely be named as vice-captain to Aron Gunnarsson. That held true when Kolbeinn captained the side after Aron was carried off injured in a World Cup qualifying match against Slovenia in June 2013.

=== UEFA Euro 2016 ===
Kolbeinn scored in Iceland's opening UEFA Euro 2016 qualifying match, a 3–0 victory over Turkey in Reykjavík. On 12 June 2015, he scored the winning goal in a 2–1 win over the Czech Republic to give Iceland a two-point lead at the top of Group A.

He was called up for the 23-man squad managed by Heimir Hallgrímsson and Lars Lagerbäck for Euro 2016. On 27 June 2016, Kolbeinn scored Iceland's second goal against England in the round of 16 at the Stade de Nice, which proved to be the decisive goal as Iceland upset England with a 2–1 victory to advance to the quarter-finals. Kolbeinn also scored from a Gylfi Sigurðsson cross in the second half of Iceland's quarter-final against France on 3 July, however it was to no avail as Iceland eventually lost 5–2.

==== FIFA World Cup 2018 ====
In May 2018 he was named on the standby list for Iceland's 23-man squad for the 2018 FIFA World Cup in Russia.

==== Expelled 2021 ====
In August 2021, Kolbeinn was selected for three 2022 FIFA World Cup qualification matches. On 27 August a young woman appeared on the Icelandic National Broadcasting Service news and related how an Icelandic international football player had abused her and another young woman in 2017. Two days later, Guðni Bergsson the chairman of the Icelandic Football Association, resigned and Kolbeinn was expelled from the national team.

== Personal life ==
His brother Andri Sigþórsson was also a professional footballer who now acts as his agent. Kolbeinn's niece is footballer Amanda Andradóttir.

=== Scandals ===
==== 2019 arrest ====
In October, Kolbeinn was arrested by the Stockholm Police at a nightclub for a drunken brawl. Kolbeinn violently resisted the club's security guard at closing time when he was asked to leave. AIK's chairman was interviewed by Expressen after the incident and claimed that Kolbeinn's behaviour had violated the club's values. The incident had no further consequences for Kolbeinn and he continued playing for AIK.

==== 2021 sexual assault allegations ====
In August 2021, Þórhildur Gyða Arnarsdóttir, an Icelandic woman in her mid-twenties, revealed that she had suffered a sexual assault by Kolbeinn in 2017. According to her description, the assault took place in a Reykjavík nightclub and included an attempted strangling. Another woman, who was unnamed at first, suffered a similar assault by Kolbeinn that same night. Þórhildur reported the assault to the Reykjavík police the following day. Six months later, when the police had still taken no action in Kolbeinn's case, Þórhildur's father realised that her daughter's perpetrator had been recruited on the Iceland national team for an upcoming match. He contacted Guðni Bergsson, president of the Football Association of Iceland, and described the assault. Guðni temporarily removed Kolbeinn from the team, but he was recruited again soon after without further consequences. During the process, Þórhildur's father even contacted Guðni Th. Jóhannesson, president of Iceland, who has long been a proud supporter of the national team and is normally present at their international matches. Guðni Th. replied the query and deplored the incident, but maintained that the case was not in his sphere of authority.

Following the arrest of Gylfi Sigurðsson in July 2021, some disturbance took place in the Icelandic social media where unconfirmed cases of other sexual assaults were reported. On 26 August, Guðni Bergsson was interviewed by RÚV, Iceland's national TV, and asked about these alleged sexual crimes by members of the Iceland national team. Guðni claimed that no formal notifications of sexual violence had ever been received by the Football Association of Iceland. His statement was contradicted the following day when Þórhildur exposed her case in a TV interview. She even added that the Football Association had hired a lawyer who offered her a compensation and asked her to sign a confidentiality agreement to cover up Kolbeinn's case. Heavy protest arose in the Icelandic media following the interview, resulting in the resignation of Guðni Bergsson and the entire board of the Football Association.

Following Guðni Bergsson's resignation, Arnar Viðarsson, head coach of Iceland, announced that Kolbeinn would not play in upcoming matches for the 2022 FIFA World Cup qualification. Håkan Mild, club director of IFK, consequently announced that he condemned Kolbeinn's behaviour. Henrik Jurelius, director of sports at AIK, claimed that neither he nor Björn Wesström, his precursor, had received any information on Kolbeinn's case when he joined the club in 2019. The Football Association of Iceland had failed to inform the club of the accusations reported to them a year earlier.

On 1 September 2021, Kolbeinn issued a statement deploring his own behaviour four years earlier. However, he denied accusations of violence and harassment and described his acts simply as "inappropriate conduct." Kolbeinn's statement prompted his other victim, Jóhanna Helga Jensdóttir, to step forward. Jóhanna was disappointed by Kolbeinn's account and understood it as a nullification of their former settlement. Both of Kolbeinn's victims had received injury notes after his treatment. After charging the assault in 2017, Þórhildur and Jóhanna were contacted by Kolbeinn's lawyer who offered them a compensation of 300.000 ISK each (approx. US$3.000) and signing an NDA. They both refused and received a second offer of 1,5 million ISK each (approx. US$15.000). An agreement was reached when Kolbeinn had consented to Þórhildur's and Jóhanna's offer of duplicating the payment and giving half of it to Stígamót, a center for survivors of sexual violence.

On 2 September, members of Ultras Göteborg, an IFK supporter group, put up ribbons at Kamratgården stadium, demanding that the club annul Kolbeinn's contract.

== Career statistics ==
=== Club ===
Appearances and goals by club, season and competition
Club	Season	League			Cup		Continental		Other (Note: Includes appearances in Johan Cruyff Shield)		Total	
Club	Season	Division	Apps	Goals	Apps	Goals	Apps	Goals	Apps	Goals	Apps	Goals
HK	2006	1. deild karla	5	1	0	0	–		–		5	1
AZ	2010–11	Eredivisie	32	15	2	0	9	3	–		43	18
Ajax	2011–12	Eredivisie	14	7	0	0	2	0	1	0	17	7
Ajax	2012–13	Eredivisie	15	7	2	2	2	0	1	0	20	9
Ajax	2013–14	Eredivisie	30	10	4	1	7	0	1	1	42	12
Ajax	2014–15	Eredivisie	21	7	0	0	4	0	1	0	26	7
Ajax	Total		80	31	6	3	15	0	4	1	105	35
Jong Ajax	2014–15	Eerste Divisie	1	0	–		–		–		1	0
Nantes	2015–16	Ligue 1	26	3	3	1	–		0	0	29	4
Nantes	2016–17	Ligue 1	2	0	0	0	–		0	0	2	0
Nantes	2017–18	Ligue 1	2	0	0	0	–		0	0	2	0
Nantes	2018–19	Ligue 1	0	0	0	0	–		0	0	0	0
Nantes	Total		30	3	3	1	0	0	0	0	33	4
Galatasaray (loan)	2016–17	Süper Lig	0	0	0	0	–		0	0	0	0
Nantes B	2017–18	Championnat National 3	2	2	–		–		–		2	2
AIK	2019	Allsvenskan	17	3	1	0	7	1	–		25	4
AIK	2020	Allsvenskan	18	0	1	0	–		–		19	0
AIK	Total		35	3	2	0	7	1	0	0	44	4
IFK Göteborg	2021	Allsvenskan	17	4	1	0	–		–		18	4
Career total			202	59	14	4	31	4	4	1	251	68

=== International ===
Appearances and goals by national team and year
National team	Year	Apps	Goals
Iceland	2010	5	3
Iceland	2011	3	1
Iceland	2012	3	4
Iceland	2013	9	5
Iceland	2014	7	3
Iceland	2015	8	2
Iceland	2016	9	4
Iceland	2017	0	0
Iceland	2018	4	1
Iceland	2019	8	3
Iceland	2020	4	0
Iceland	2021	4	0
Total		64	26

As of match played 14 October 2019
Scores and results list Iceland's goal tally first, score column indicates score after each Kolbeinn goal.

List of international goals scored by Kolbeinn Sigþórsson
No.	Date	Venue	Cap	Opponent	Score	Result	Competition
1	21 March 2010	Kórinn, Kópavogur, Iceland	1	Faroe Islands	2–0	2–0	Friendly
2	29 May 2010	Laugardalsvöllur, Reykjavík, Iceland	3	Andorra	4–0	4–0	Friendly
3	17 November 2010	Bloomfield Stadium, Tel Aviv, Israel	5	Israel	2–3	2–3	Friendly
4	6 September 2011	Laugardalsvöllur, Reykjavík, Iceland	8	Cyprus	1–0	1–0	UEFA Euro 2012 qualification
5	27 May 2012	Stade du Hainaut, Valenciennes, France	9	France	2–0	2–3	Friendly
6	30 May 2012	Gamla Ullevi, Gothenburg, Sweden	10	Sweden	1–2	2–3	Friendly
7	15 August 2012	Laugardalsvöllur, Reykjavík, Iceland	11	Faroe Islands	1–0	2–0	Friendly
8	15 August 2012	Laugardalsvöllur, Reykjavík, Iceland	11	Faroe Islands	2–0	2–0	Friendly
9	14 August 2013	Laugardalsvöllur, Reykjavík, Iceland	15	Faroe Islands	1–0	1–0	Friendly
10	6 September 2013	Stade de Suisse, Bern, Switzerland	16	Switzerland	2–4	4–4	2014 FIFA World Cup qualification
11	10 September 2013	Laugardalsvöllur, Reykjavík, Iceland	17	Albania	2–1	2–1	2014 FIFA World Cup qualification
12	11 October 2013	Laugardalsvöllur, Reykjavík, Iceland	18	Cyprus	1–0	2–0	2014 FIFA World Cup qualification
13	15 October 2013	Ullevaal Stadion, Oslo, Norway	19	Norway	1–0	1–1	2014 FIFA World Cup qualification
14	30 May 2014	Tivoli-Neu, Innsbruck, Austria	22	Austria	1–1	1–1	Friendly
15	4 June 2014	Laugardalsvöllur, Reykjavík, Iceland	23	Estonia	1–0	1–0	Friendly
16	9 September 2014	Laugardalsvöllur, Reykjavík, Iceland	24	Turkey	3–0	3–0	Friendly
17	12 June 2015	Laugardalsvöllur, Reykjavík, Iceland	29	Czech Republic	2–1	2–1	UEFA Euro 2016 qualification
18	10 October 2015	Laugardalsvöllur, Reykjavík, Iceland	32	Latvia	1–0	2–2	UEFA Euro 2016 qualification
19	29 March 2016	Karaiskakis Stadium, Piraeus, Greece	37	Greece	3–2	3–2	Friendly
20	6 June 2016	Laugardalsvöllur, Reykjavík, Iceland	39	Liechtenstein	1–0	4–0	Friendly
21	27 June 2016	Stade de Nice, Nice, France	43	England	2–1	2–1	UEFA Euro 2016
22	3 July 2016	Stade de France, Saint-Denis, France	44	France	1–4	2–5	UEFA Euro 2016
23	19 November 2018	Kehrwegstadion, Eupen, Belgium	48	Qatar	2–1	2–2	Friendly
24	7 September 2019	Laugardalsvöllur, Reykjavík, Iceland	51	Moldova	1–0	3–0	UEFA Euro 2020 qualification
25	10 September 2019	Elbasan Arena, Elbasan, Albania	52	Albania	2–2	2–4	UEFA Euro 2020 qualification
26	14 October 2019	Laugardalsvöllur, Reykjavík, Iceland	54	Andorra	2–0	2–0	UEFA Euro 2020 qualification

== Honours ==
Ajax

- Eredivisie: 2011–12, 2012–13, 2013–14
- Johan Cruyff Shield: 2013
