= Adrien Thomasson =

French footballer (born 1993)

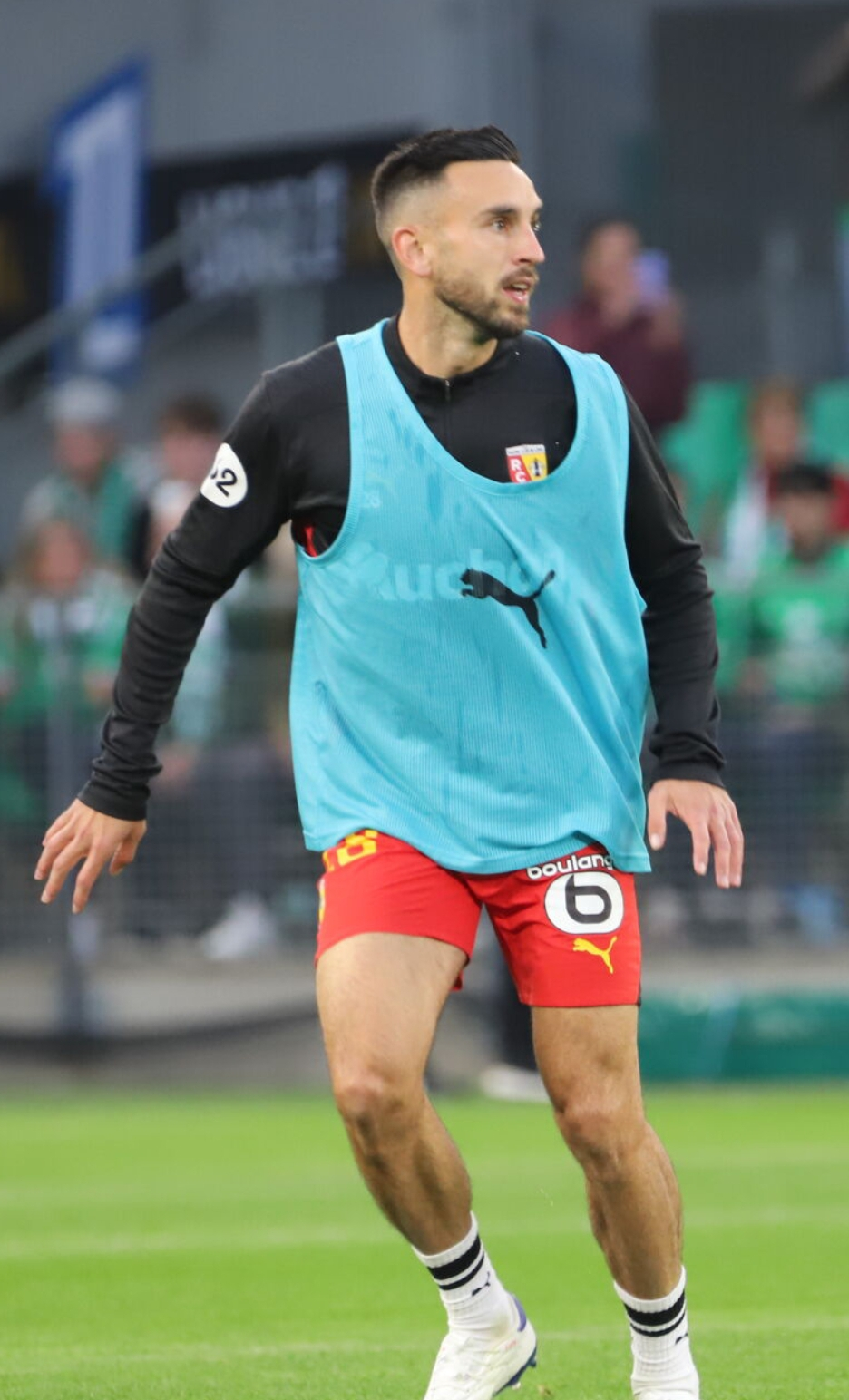
- Thomasson training with Lens in 2024

Personal information
- Full name: Adrien Ivan Thomasson
- Date of birth: 10 December 1993 (age 32)
- Place of birth: Bourg-Saint-Maurice, France
- Height: 1.82 m (6 ft 0 in)
- Position: Midfielder

Team information
- Current team: Rennes

Senior career*
Years	Team	Apps	(Gls)
2012–2015	Evian	24	(2)
2012–2014	Evian II	30	(10)
2013–2014	→ Vannes (loan)	27	(8)
2015–2018	Nantes	99	(9)
2018–2023	Strasbourg	142	(26)
2023–2026	Lens	114	(12)
2026–	Rennes	0	(0)
- * Club domestic league appearances and goals as of 17 May 2026

Adrien Ivan Thomasson (born 10 December 1993) is a French professional footballer who plays as a midfielder for Ligue 1 club Rennes.

== Career ==
Born in Savoie, Thomasson began playing youth football with local Evian before turning professional with the club's senior side. He plays as a central midfielder, but played on the left flank, notably while on loan at Vannes.

In June 2018, Thomasson joined Strasbourg on a three-year contract.

On 12 January 2023, Thomasson signed for Lens on a three-and-a-half-year contract. On 23 January 2023, he played his first game and scored his first goal with Lens during a Coupe de France match against Brest. For his second game with Lens on 28 January, he scored his second goal against Troyes. On 3 October 2023, Thomasson scored his first UEFA Champions League goal, scoring Lens's equalizer in a 2–1 victory over Arsenal.

=== Rennes ===
On May 28, 2026, Rennes confirmed that they had signed Thomasson on a three-year contract after his contract with Lens had expired without renewal.

== Personal life ==
Thomasson was born in France to a French father of Swedish descent and a Croatian mother. He holds French and Croatian nationalities.

== Career statistics ==
As of match played 22 May 2026

Appearances by club, season and competition
Club	Season	League			National cup		League cup		Europe		Total	
Club	Season	Division	Apps	Goals	Apps	Goals	Apps	Goals	Apps	Goals	Apps	Goals
Evian	2011–12	Ligue 1	3	0	0	0	0	0	—		3	0
Evian	2014–15	Ligue 1	21	2	2	0	1	0	—		24	2
Evian	Total		24	2	2	0	1	0	—		27	2
Evian II	2012–13	CFA 2	24	9	—		—		—		24	9
Evian II	2013–14	CFA 2	1	1	—		—		—		1	1
Evian II	2014–15	CFA 2	5	0	—		—		—		5	0
Evian II	Total		30	10	—		—		—		30	10
Vannes (loan)	2013–14	National	27	8	2	1	—				29	9
Nantes	2015–16	Ligue 1	34	2	4	1	1	0	—		39	3
Nantes	2016–17	Ligue 1	29	2	2	0	2	1	—		33	3
Nantes	2017–18	Ligue 1	36	5	1	2	1	0	—		38	7
Nantes	Total		99	9	7	3	4	1	—		110	13
Strasbourg	2018–19	Ligue 1	34	5	0	0	4	0	—		38	5
Strasbourg	2019–20	Ligue 1	25	8	2	1	1	0	4 (Note: Appearances in UEFA Europa League)	1	32	10
Strasbourg	2020–21	Ligue 1	37	5	0	0	—		—		37	5
Strasbourg	2021–22	Ligue 1	31	7	2	0	—		—		33	7
Strasbourg	2022–23	Ligue 1	15	0	1	0	—		—		16	0
Strasbourg	Total		142	25	5	1	5	0	4	1	156	27
Lens	2022–23	Ligue 1	20	5	3	1	—		—		23	6
Lens	2023–24	Ligue 1	29	1	1	0	—		5 (Note: Appearances in UEFA Champions League)	1	35	2
Lens	2024–25	Ligue 1	33	3	1	0	—		2 (Note: Appearances in UEFA Conference League)	0	36	3
Lens	2025–26	Ligue 1	32	3	4	1	—		—		36	4
Lens	Total		114	12	9	2	—		7	1	130	15
Career total			436	66	25	7	10	1	11	2	482	76

== Honours ==
Strasbourg

- Coupe de la Ligue: 2018–19

Lens

- Coupe de France: 2025–26
