= Yacine Bammou =

Footballer (born 1991)

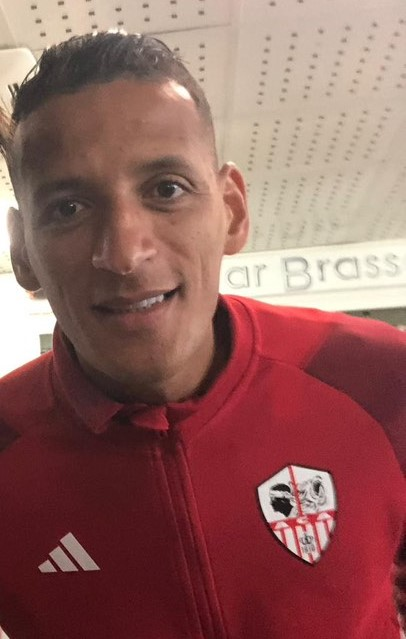
- Bammou with Ajaccio in 2023

Personal information
- Full name: Yacine Bammou
- Date of birth: 11 September 1991 (age 35)
- Place of birth: Paris, France
- Height: 1.88 m (6 ft 2 in)
- Position: Striker

Team information
- Current team: Union Touarga

Senior career*
Years	Team	Apps	(Gls)
2012–2013	Évry	22	(6)
2013–2018	Nantes B	13	(4)
2014	→ Luçon (loan)	13	(0)
2014–2018	Nantes	117	(16)
2018–2021	Caen	34	(8)
2019–2020	→ Alanyaspor (loan)	18	(2)
2021–2022	Ümraniyespor	28	(10)
2022–2023	Al-Shamal	21	(5)
2023	Ajaccio	18	(3)
2024	Guangxi Pingguo Haliao	16	(2)
2024–2025	Dunkerque	29	(5)
2025–	Union Touarga	0	(0)

International career
2015–2018	Morocco	7	(1)
- * Club domestic league appearances and goals as of 11 May 2025

Yacine Bammou (Arabic: ياسين بامو; born 11 September 1991) is a professional footballer who plays as a striker for Union Touarga. Born in France, he played for the Morocco national team.

== Club career ==
Bammou made his Ligue 1 debut on 9 August 2014 against Lens in a 1–0 home win replacing Fernando Aristeguieta after 64 minutes. One minute later he scored the winning goal.

In July 2018, he signed a four-year contract with Caen.

On 2 July 2021, he returned to Turkey and joined Ümraniyespor.

On 25 December 2023, China League One club Guangxi Pingguo Haliao announced the signing of Bammou, taking effect on 1 January 2024.

== Career statistics ==
=== Club ===
As of match played 17 May 2025

Appearances and goals by club, season and competition
Club	Season	League			National cup		League cup		Other		Total	
Club	Season	Division	Apps	Goals	Apps	Goals	Apps	Goals	Apps	Goals	Apps	Goals
Évry	2012–13	CFA 2	22	6	1	0	—		—		23	6
Nantes B	2013–14	CFA	12	3	—		—		—		12	3
Nantes B	2018–19	NA3	1	1	—		—		—		1	1
Nantes B	Total		13	4	0	0	—		—		13	4
Luçon (loan)	2013–14	NA1	13	0	—		—		—		13	0
Nantes	2014–15	Ligue 1	37	4	1	0	3	0	—		40	4
Nantes	2015–16	Ligue 1	32	4	3	1	1	0	—		35	5
Nantes	2016–17	Ligue 1	32	4	1	0	1	0	—		34	4
Nantes	2017–18	Ligue 1	16	3	2	1	1	0	—		19	4
Nantes	Total		117	15	8	2	6	0	—		131	17
Caen	2018–19	Ligue 1	17	2	3	2	1	0	—		21	4
Caen	2020–21	Ligue 2	17	6	2	0	—		—		19	6
Caen	Total		34	8	5	2	1	0	—		40	10
Alanyaspor (loan)	2019–20	Süper Lig	18	2	7	4	—		—		25	6
Ümraniyespor	2021–22	TFF First League	28	10	2	0	—		—		30	10
Al-Shamal	2022–23	Qatar Stars League	21	5	1	0	5	1	1	0	28	6
Ajaccio	2023–24	Ligue 2	18	3	1	0	—		—		19	3
Guangxi Pingguo Haliao	2024	China League One	16	2	1	0	—		—		17	2
Dunkerque	2024–25	Ligue 2	29	5	5	1	—		1 (Note: Appearance(s) in Ligue 2 promotion play-offs)	0	35	6
Career total			329	60	31	13	0	0	2	0	362	73

=== International goals ===
Scores and results list Morocco's goal tally first.

Goal	Date	Venue	Opponent	Score	Result	Competition
1.	12 November 2015	Stade Adrar, Agadir, Morocco	Equatorial Guinea	2–0	2–0	2018 FIFA World Cup qualification
