= Valentin Rongier =

French footballer (born 1994)

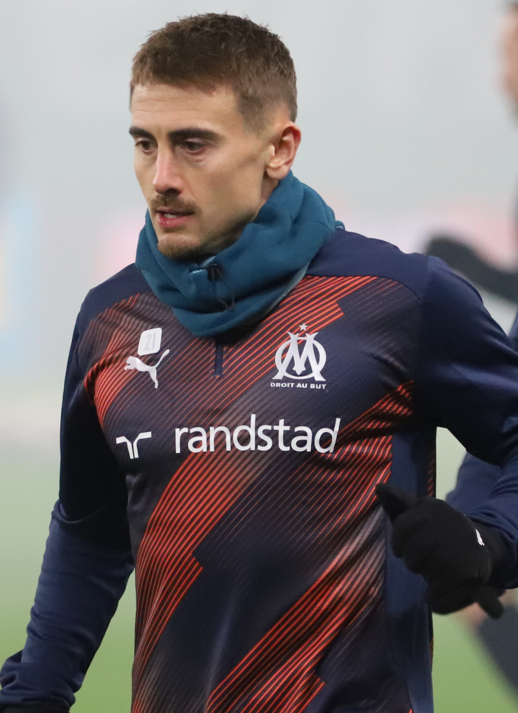
- Rongier with Marseille in 2024

Personal information
- Date of birth: 7 December 1994 (age 31)
- Place of birth: Mâcon, France
- Height: 1.72 m (5 ft 8 in)
- Position: Midfielder

Team information
- Current team: Rennes
- Number: 21

Youth career
- 2000–2001: Saint-Herblain OC
- 2001–2014: Nantes

Senior career*
Years	Team	Apps	(Gls)
2013–2015	Nantes B	39	(2)
2014–2019	Nantes	119	(8)
2019–2025	Marseille	152	(6)
2025–	Rennes	41	(3)
- * Club domestic league appearances and goals as of 8 November 2026

Valentin Rongier (born 7 December 1994) is a French professional footballer who plays as a midfielder for Ligue 1 club Rennes.

== Career ==
=== Nantes ===
Born in Mâcon, Rongier joined Nantes' youth academy in 2001. He made his Ligue 1 debut for the club on 18 October 2014 against Reims in a 1–1 draw, coming off the bench to replace Lucas Déaux in the 78th minute mark. He was appointed club captain ahead of the 2018–19 season.

=== Marseille ===
On 3 September 2019, Rongier joined Olympique de Marseille on a five-year contract for a €13 million transfer fee. The transfer was completed outside the transfer window dates thanks to a "joker" transfer exemption created by the Ligue de Football Professionnel.

=== Rennes ===
On 21 July 2025, Rongier signed with Ligue 1 side Rennes, signing a three-year deal.

== Career statistics ==
As of match played 8 November 2026

Appearances and goals by club, season and competition
Club	Season	League			National cup		League cup		Europe		Other		Total	
Club	Season	Division	Apps	Goals	Apps	Goals	Apps	Goals	Apps	Goals	Apps	Goals	Apps	Goals
Nantes B	2012–13	CFA 2	1	1	—		—		—		—		1	1
Nantes B	2013–14	CFA	23	0	—		—		—		—		23	0
Nantes B	2014–15	CFA	15	1	—		—		—		—		15	1
Nantes B	Total		39	2	—		—		—		—		39	2
Nantes	2014–15	Ligue 1	6	0	1	1	1	0	—		—		8	1
Nantes	2015–16	Ligue 1	11	1	0	0	—		—		—		11	1
Nantes	2016–17	Ligue 1	31	2	2	0	2	0	—		—		35	2
Nantes	2017–18	Ligue 1	32	1	2	1	1	0	—		—		35	2
Nantes	2018–19	Ligue 1	36	4	5	0	2	0	—		—		43	4
Nantes	2019–20	Ligue 1	3	0	—		—		—		—		3	0
Nantes	Total		119	8	10	2	6	0	—		—		135	10
Marseille	2019–20	Ligue 1	23	0	4	0	1	0	—		—		28	0
Marseille	2020–21	Ligue 1	26	1	1	0	—		6 (Note: Appearances in UEFA Champions League)	0	1 (Note: Appearance in Trophée des Champions)	0	34	1
Marseille	2021–22	Ligue 1	32	0	3	0	—		11 (Note: Four appearances in UEFA Europa League, seven appearances and one goal in UEFA Europa Conference League)	1	—		46	1
Marseille	2022–23	Ligue 1	36	1	4	0	—		6	0	—		46	1
Marseille	2023–24	Ligue 1	10	0	0	0	—		5 (Note: Two appearances in UEFA Champions League, three appearances in UEFA Europa League)	0	—		15	0
Marseille	2024–25	Ligue 1	25	3	2	0	—		—		—		27	3
Marseille	Total		152	5	14	0	1	0	28	1	1	0	196	6
Rennes	2025–26	Ligue 1	31	2	2	0	—		—		—		33	2
Rennes	2026–27	Ligue 1	10	1	0	0	—		4 (Note: Appearances in UEFA Europa League)	0	—		14	1
Rennes	Total		41	3	2	0	—		4	0	—		47	3
Career total			351	18	26	2	7	0	32	1	1	0	417	21

== Honours ==
Marseille

- Trophée des Champions runner-up: 2020

Individual

- UNFP Ligue 1 Team of the Year: 2022–23
