= Quentin Braat =

French professional footballer (born 1997)

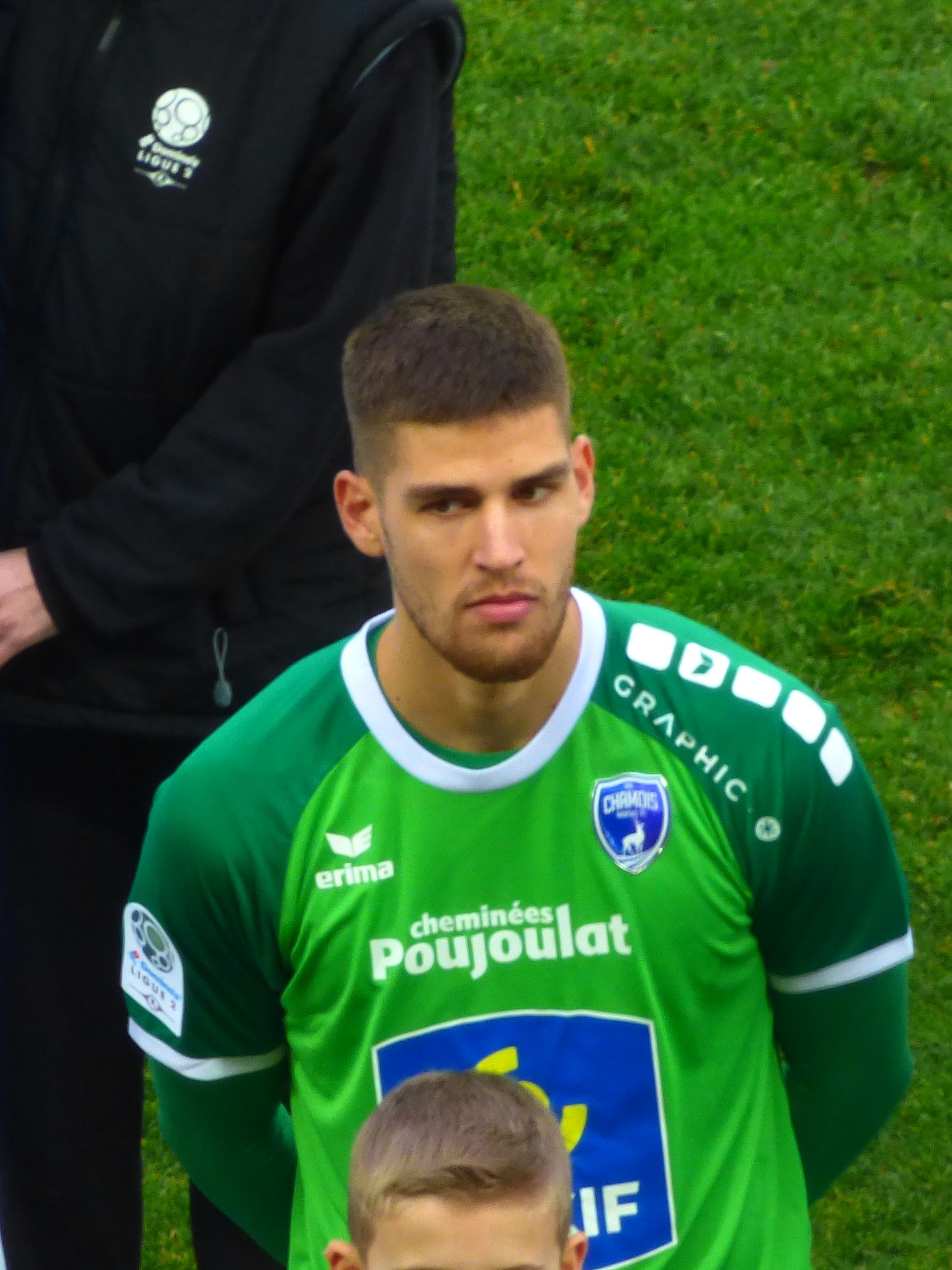
- Quentin Braat during the Lens/Niort game, 21 December 2019.

Personal information
- Date of birth: 6 July 1997 (age 29)
- Place of birth: Fontainebleau, France
- Height: 1.93 m (6 ft 4 in)
- Position: Goalkeeper

Team information
- Current team: Rodez
- Number: 1

Youth career
- 2006–2008: CA Pithiviers
- 2008: SC Malesherbes
- 2008–2012: Orléans
- 2012–2017: Nantes

Senior career*
Years	Team	Apps	(Gls)
2015–2020	Nantes II	41	(0)
2019–2020	→ Niort (loan)	16	(0)
2020–2022	Niort	34	(0)
2022–2025	Oviedo	27	(0)
2025–	Rodez	34	(0)

International career
2015–2016	France U19	7	(0)
2016	France U20	1	(0)
- * Club domestic league appearances and goals as of 11 May 2026

Quentin Braat (born 6 July 1997) is a French professional footballer who plays as a goalkeeper for Rodez.

== Professional career ==
On 25 May 2017, Braat signed his first professional contract with FC Nantes. On 30 June 2019, he went on loan to Niort for the 2019-20 Ligue 2 season. Braat made his professional debut with Niort in a 2-0 Ligue 2 loss to Troyes AC on 26 July 2019. He left Niort at the end of the 2021–22 season having made 55 appearances for the club in all competitions.

On 1 July 2022, Braat signed a three-year contract with Oviedo in Spain. On 24 June 2025, he returned to his home country after signing for Rodez.

== Career statistics ==
As of match played 6 February 2026

Appearances and goals by club, season and competition
Club	Season	League			National cup		League cup		Europe		Other		Total	
Club	Season	Division	Apps	Goals	Apps	Goals	Apps	Goals	Apps	Goals	Apps	Goals	Apps	Goals
Nantes II	2014–15	CFA	3	0	—		—		—		—		3	0
Nantes II	2015–16	CFA	11	0	—		—		—		—		11	0
Nantes II	2016–17	CFA	8	0	—		—		—		—		8	0
Nantes II	2017–18	National 3	11	0	—		—		—		—		11	0
Nantes II	2018–19	National 2	8	0	—		—		—		—		8	0
Nantes II	Total		41	0	—		—		—		—		41	0
Nantes	2015–16	Ligue 1	0	0	0	0	0	0	—		—		0	0
Nantes	2016–17	Ligue 1	0	0	0	0	0	0	—		—		0	0
Nantes	Total		0	0	0	0	0	0	—		—		0	0
Niort (loan)	2019–20	Ligue 2	16	0	1	0	2	0	—		—		19	0
Niort	2020–21	Ligue 2	8	0	0	0	—		—		2	0	10	0
Niort	2021–22	Ligue 2	26	0	0	0	—		—		—		26	0
Niort	Total		50	0	1	0	2	0	—		2	0	55	0
Oviedo	2022–23	Segunda División	26	0	1	0	—		—		—		27	0
Oviedo	2023–24	Segunda División	0	0	2	0	—		—		0	0	2	0
Oviedo	2024–25	Segunda División	1	0	1	0	—		—		0	0	2	0
Oviedo	Total		27	0	4	0	—		—		0	0	31	0
Rodez	2025–26	Ligue 2	22	0	1	0	—		—		—		23	0
Career total			140	0	6	0	2	0	0	0	2	0	150	0
