= Jules Iloki =

French footballer (born 1992)

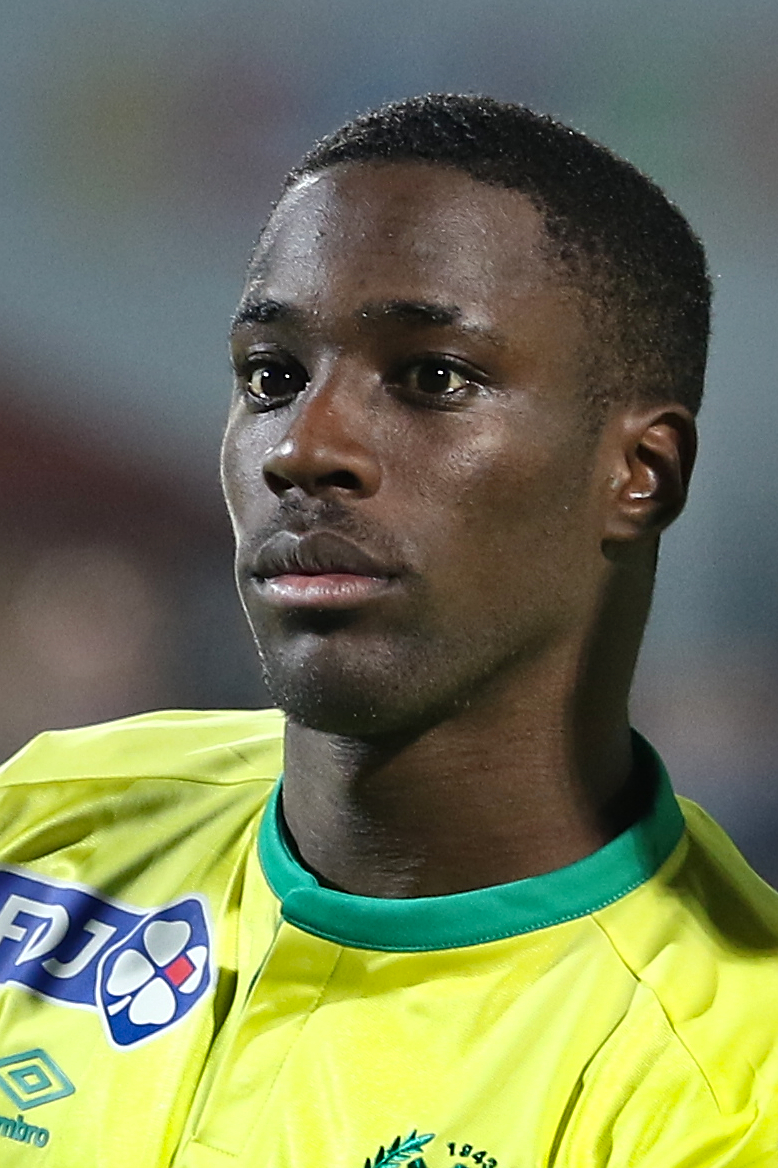

Personal information
- Full name: Jules Hermon Aziz Iloki
- Date of birth: 14 January 1992 (age 34)
- Place of birth: Paris, France
- Height: 1.72 m (5 ft 8 in)
- Position: Winger

Youth career
- –2006: Linas-Montlhéry
- 2006–2012: Nantes

Senior career*
| Years | Team | Apps | (Gls) |
| 2012–2016 | Nantes B | 68 | (11) |
| 2014–2018 | Nantes | 72 | (2) |
| 2013–2014 | → Luçon (loan) | 11 | (1) |
| 2019 | Concordia Chiajna | 7 | (0) |
| 2020–2021 | Sichuan Jiuniu | 3 | (0) |
| 2020 | → Suzhou Dongwu (loan) | 5 | (1) |
| 2021–2022 | Tianjin Jinmen Tiger | 17 | (3) |
- * Club domestic league appearances and goals as of 3 January 2022

Jules Hermon Aziz Iloki (born 14 January 1992) is a French professional footballer who last played as a winger for Chinese Super League club Tianjin Jinmen Tiger.

== Early life ==
Iloki was born in the 12th arrondissement of Paris, to a Guinean mother born in Conakry. He acquired the French nationality on 27 June 1996, through the collective effect of his mother's naturalization.

== Club career ==
Iloki made his Ligue 1 debut at 25 October 2014 against Evian Thonon Gaillard in a 2–0 away win. He replaced Vincent Bessat after 73 minutes.

On 30 July 2020, Iloki transferred to China League One club Sichuan Jiuniu. On 22 October 2020, Iloki was loaned to fellow China League One club Suzhou Dongwu.

== International career ==
Iloki was called up to the Congo national football team in 2015.

== Career statistics ==
As of 3 January 2022.

Appearances and goals by club, season and competition
| Club | Season | League | | | National Cup | | League Cup | | Continental | | Total | |
| Club | Season | Division | Apps | Goals | Apps | Goals | Apps | Goals | Apps | Goals | Apps | Goals |
|---|---|---|---|---|---|---|---|---|---|---|---|---|
| Nantes B | 2012–13 | CFA 2 | 22 | 2 | — | | — | | — | | 22 | 2 |
| Nantes B | 2013–14 | CFA | 12 | 0 | — | | — | | — | | 12 | 0 |
| Nantes B | 2014–15 | CFA | 26 | 7 | — | | — | | — | | 26 | 7 |
| Nantes B | 2015–16 | CFA | 6 | 2 | — | | — | | — | | 6 | 2 |
| Nantes B | 2016–17 | CFA | 2 | 0 | — | | — | | — | | 2 | 0 |
| Nantes B | Total | | 68 | 11 | — | | — | | — | | 68 | 11 |
| Nantes | 2014–15 | Ligue 1 | 2 | 0 | 1 | 0 | 1 | 0 | — | | 4 | 0 |
| Nantes | 2015–16 | Ligue 1 | 21 | 1 | 4 | 0 | 1 | 0 | — | | 26 | 1 |
| Nantes | 2016–17 | Ligue 1 | 23 | 1 | 2 | 0 | 2 | 0 | — | | 27 | 1 |
| Nantes | 2017–18 | Ligue 1 | 26 | 0 | 2 | 0 | 1 | 0 | — | | 29 | 0 |
| Nantes | Total | | 72 | 2 | 9 | 0 | 5 | 0 | — | | 86 | 2 |
| Luçon (loan) | 2013–14 | Championnat National | 11 | 1 | 0 | 0 | — | | — | | 11 | 1 |
| Concordia Chiajna | 2018–19 | Liga I | 7 | 0 | 0 | 0 | — | | — | | 7 | 0 |
| Sichuan Jiuniu | 2020 | China League One | 3 | 0 | — | | — | | — | | 3 | 0 |
| Suzhou Dongwu (loan) | 2020 | China League One | 5 | 1 | 1 | 0 | — | | — | | 6 | 1 |
| Tianjin Jinmen Tiger | 2021 | Chinese Super League | 17 | 3 | 0 | 0 | — | | — | | 17 | 3 |
| Career total | | | 166 | 15 | 10 | 0 | 5 | 0 | 0 | 0 | 181 | 15 |

== Honours ==
Nantes U19

- Coupe Gambardella runner-up: 2008–09
