= Johan Audel =

Footballer (born 1983)

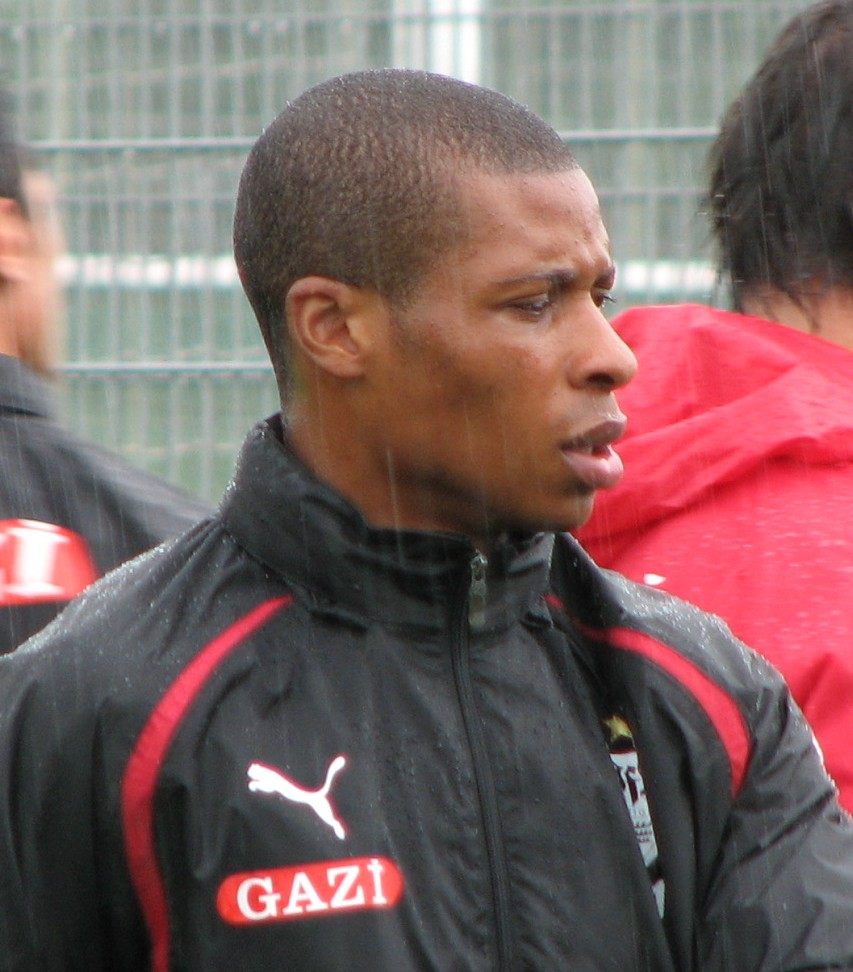
- Audel with VfB Stuttgart

Personal information
- Date of birth: 12 December 1983 (age 42)
- Place of birth: Nice, France
- Height: 1.80 m (5 ft 11 in)
- Positions: Winger; striker

Youth career
- 2000–2003: Nice

Senior career*
Years	Team	Apps	(Gls)
2003–2004	Nice	0	(0)
2004–2006	Lille	19	(3)
2005–2006	→ Lorient (loan)	30	(8)
2007–2010	Valenciennes	77	(23)
2010–2013	VfB Stuttgart	3	(0)
2012–2013	VfB Stuttgart II	6	(0)
2013–2015	Nantes B	5	(1)
2013–2016	Nantes	53	(5)
2016–2017	Beitar Jerusalem	12	(0)

International career
2016–2018	Martinique	5	(1)
- * Club domestic league appearances and goals

Johan Audel (born 12 December 1983) is a footballer who played as a winger. Born in metropolitan France, he played for the Martinique national team. He is the brother of French player Thierry Audel.

== Career ==
Audel began his career in the youth academy of south coast club OGC Nice before moving to French rivals Lille for the 2004–05 season. He stayed with the team for his first season with the club, before moving on loan to FC Lorient the following season. Eight goals in 30 games followed before Audel returned to his parent club. In the summer of 2007, he joined Ligue 1 Valenciennes FC and instantly proved his worth with a hat-trick in his first game against Toulouse FC, making him a very popular player for the fans.

On 9 August 2010, Audel moved to VfB Stuttgart on a four-year contract.

He was loaned out to FC Nantes on 2 September 2013 until June 2014, after his contract with VfB Stuttgart was extended until June 2015. On 24 May 2014, Audel signed a contract with FC Nantes until June 2016 and moved permanently to Nantes.

== Career statistics ==
Score and result list Martinique's goal tally first, score column indicates score after Audel goal.

International goal scored by Johan Audel
No.	Date	Venue	Cap	Opponent	Score	Result	Competition
1	7 June 2016	Windsor Park, Roseau, Dominica	2	Dominica	1–0	4–0	2017 Caribbean Cup qualification

== Honours ==
Lille

- UEFA Intertoto Cup: 2004
