= Wilfried Moimbé =

French footballer (born 1988)

Personal information
- Full name: Wilfried Moimbé-Tahrat
- Date of birth: 18 October 1988 (age 38)
- Place of birth: Vichy, France
- Height: 1.73 m (5 ft 8 in)
- Position: Left back

Team information
- Current team: Ouest Tourangeau

Youth career
- Bordeaux

Senior career*
Years	Team	Apps	(Gls)
2005–2010	Bordeaux B		
2008–2009	→ Reims (loan)	20	(0)
2009–2010	→ Ajaccio (loan)	20	(0)
2010–2013	Tours	75	(0)
2013–2015	Brest	56	(1)
2015–2018	Nantes	23	(0)
2018	Oldham Athletic	11	(0)
2018–2019	Nancy	24	(1)
2019	Minnesota United	4	(1)
2022–	Ouest Tourangeau	42	(0)
- * Club domestic league appearances and goals as of 9 November 2024

Wilfried Moimbé-Tahrat (born 18 October 1988) is a French professional footballer who plays as a defender for Championnat National 3 club Ouest Tourangeau.

== Career ==
Moimbé played for the main squad of FC Girondins de Bordeaux on 19 December 2007 in a final group stage game of the 2007–08 UEFA Cup against Panionios F.C., coming on as a substitute in the 81st minute and scoring the winning goal on the 87th minute.

On 9 June 2015, Moimbé joined FC Nantes on a three-year deal.

On 31 January 2018, Moimbé signed for Oldham Athletic on a short-term deal until the end of the 2017–2018 season.

In September 2018, Moimbé signed with AS Nancy in French Ligue 2 as a free agent.

On 23 July 2019, Moimbé joined MLS side Minnesota United. He was released by Minnesota at the end of the season.

== Personal life ==
Born in Metropolitan France, Moimbé is of Reunion and Malian descent. He is married to an Algerian native.
