= Alexis Alégué =

Cameroonian footballer (born 1996)

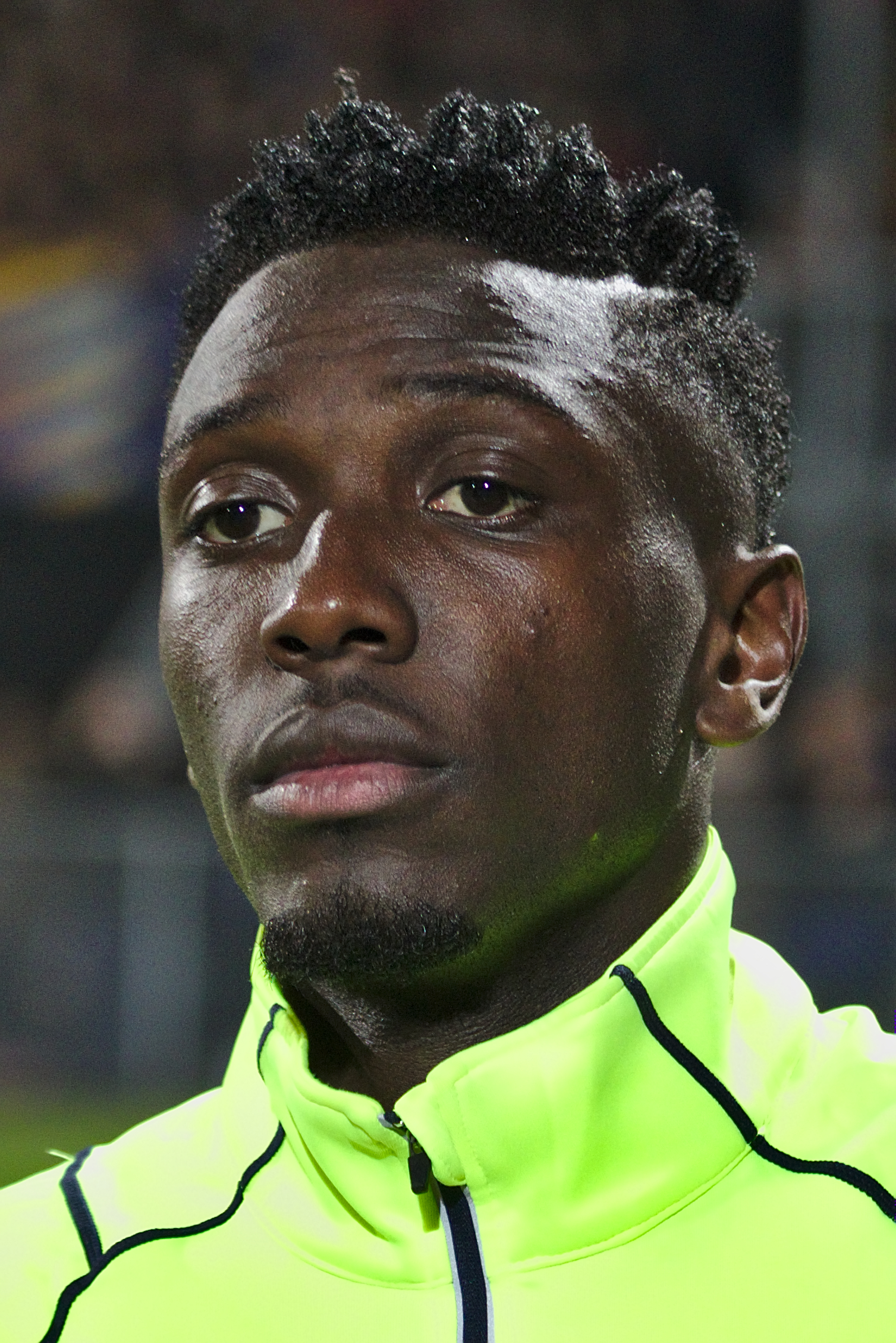
- Alégué in 2015

Personal information
- Date of birth: 23 December 1996 (age 29)
- Place of birth: Yaoundé, Cameroon
- Height: 1.75 m (5 ft 9 in)
- Positions: Winger; midfielder

Team information
- Current team: Artis Brno
- Number: 7

Youth career
- 2008–2009: CSM Puteaux
- 2009–2010: Boulogne-Billancourt
- 2010–2014: Nantes

Senior career*
Years	Team	Apps	(Gls)
2014–2019	Nantes B	62	(6)
2015–2019	Nantes	6	(1)
2018–2019	→ Tours B (loan)	3	(0)
2018–2019	→ Tours (loan)	20	(1)
2020–2021	Rodez B	1	(1)
2020–2021	Rodez	12	(0)
2022–2023	MFK Vyškov	27	(5)
2023–2026	Jablonec	88	(8)
2026–	Artis Brno	0	(0)

International career
2012	France U16	1	(0)
2016	Cameroon U23	1	(1)
- * Club domestic league appearances and goals as of 27 May 2026

Alexis Alégué Elandi (born 23 December 1996) is a Cameroonian professional footballer who plays as a striker for Czech First League club Artis Brno.

== Club career ==
Alégué made his Ligue 1 debut with FC Nantes on 4 November 2015 against OGC Nice in a 1–2 away win. He managed to score his first league goal in his first appearance.

On 31 December 2019, Alégué joined Rodez AF on a deal until the end of the season.

On 12 June 2023, Alégué joined Jablonec.

On 22 July 2026, Alégué signed a contract with Artis Brno.

== International career ==
Alégué was born in Cameroon and moved to France at a young age. He is a youth international for France. He then represented the Cameroon U23s in a 3–2 win over the Morocco U23s in October 2016, wherein he scored the opening goal.
