= Anthony Walongwa =

Footballer (born 1993)

Personal information
- Date of birth: 15 October 1993 (age 33)
- Place of birth: Nantes, France
- Height: 1.82 m (6 ft 0 in)
- Position: Centre-back

Team information
- Current team: USSA Vertou

Youth career
- 2011–2014: Nantes

Senior career*
Years	Team	Apps	(Gls)
2013–2021	Nantes II	162	(12)
2014–2021	Nantes	6	(0)
2018	→ Grenoble (loan)	1	(0)
2022–2023	Fontenay	33	(0)
2023–	USSA Vertou	29	(0)

International career^{‡}
2013–2015	DR Congo U20	2	(0)
- * Club domestic league appearances and goals as of 9 November 2024 ‡ National team caps and goals as of 4 December 2022

Anthony Walongwa (born 15 October 1993) is a professional footballer who plays as a centre-back for Championnat National 3 club USSA Vertou. Born in France, he is a former DR Congo youth international.

== Personal life ==
Walongwa was born in Nantes, in the west of France, to a father from the Democratic Republic of the Congo and a mother from the Republic of Congo. He holds French and Congolese nationalities.

== Club career ==
A youth product of Nantes, Walongwa made his professional debut in May 2016, in a 2–1 Ligue 1 defeat against Caen.

== International career ==
Walongwa represented the DR Congo U20s in the 2013 Toulon Tournament, and the 2015 African U-20 Championship qualification.
