= San Mariano =

San Mariano may refer to:

- San Mariano, Argentina
- San Mariano, Corciano, Italy
- San Mariano, Isabela, Philippines
- Maragusan, Davao de Oro, Philippines, whose name is San Mariano until 1988
- San Mariano, deacon and Martyr of the Catholic Church from Grumentum, Ripacandida

== See also ==
- Mariano, a masculine name
