= Ituzaingó =

Ituzaingó may refer to:

- Ituzaingó, Buenos Aires, a city in Argentina
- Ituzaingó, Corrientes, a city in Argentina
- Ituzaingó, Montevideo, a barrio of Montevideo, Uruguay
- Ituzaingó, Santa Fe, a town in Argentina
- Ituzaingó, Uruguay, a town of San José, Uruguay
- Ituzaingó Department, a department of the province of Corrientes in Argentina
- Battle of Ituzaingó, a battle fought in 1827 in the vicinity of the Santa Maria river, southern Brazil
- Club Atlético Ituzaingó, Argentine football club based in Ituzaingó, Buenos Aires
