= Maria Matilde Principi =

Italian entomologist (1915-2017)

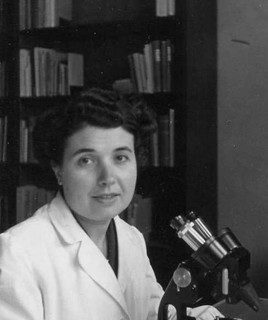
- Principi in the 1950s
- Born: 4 May 1915; San Mariano
- Died: 10 September 2017 (aged 102); Bologna
- Education: University of Perugia; University of Bologna
- Occupations: Entomologist, professor

Maria Matilde Principi (4 May 1915 – 10 September 2017) was an Italian entomologist and became professor emerita at the University of Bologna where she led the department for thirty years.

== Biography ==
Principi was born in San Mariano, just outside Perugia, on 4 May 1915, the daughter of Paolina Paletti, and the geologist Paolo Principi (who had been an assistant to geologist Arturo Issel). Maria graduated in agricultural sciences from the University of Perugia in 1937, with her entomology thesis on the Chrysopid Neuroptera of Umbria. Later, she earned her PhD at the University of Bologna.

=== Career ===
In 1938, she won a scholarship competition sponsored by the Ministry of Agriculture and Forestry. One member of the judging group was the esteemed entomologist Guido Grandi (1886-1970) who, at the conclusion of the contest, invited Principi to relocate to the University of Bologna and join his institute. There, she was appointed an assistant and in 1951 she earned a teaching qualification in entomology. When Grandi retired as head of the institute, she took over his chair at the Bolognese University, leading the department for thirty years and subsequently founding its PhD program in agricultural entomology.

The life cycle of the ant-eating insect, antlion.

In her professional research, she studied Neuropteroids, including the ant-eating insects called antlions. Principi wrote more than one hundred scientific articles on insects.

During the academic year 1959/1960 she supervised the degree thesis Research on the parasites of three Lepidoptera miners of apple leaves by Giorgio Celli, who later became a famous Italian ethologist and entomologist, and a politician and television personality. When she retired in 1994 as an internationally renowned scientist, Principi was named Professor Emerita of the University of Bologna.

Principi died in Bologna on 10 September 2017, aged 102.

=== Selected honors ===
Principi received numerous honors, including Benedictine Academician by the Academy of Sciences of the Institute of Bologna, and was a member of numerous scientific organizations including the Italian Entomological Society and the Accademia dei Georgofili of Florence.

In 1991, the Austrian entomologists Horst and Ulrike Aspöck and Hubert Rausch dedicated their two-volume set Die Raphidiopteren der Erde (1991) to her and named a new species of Neuroptera in her honor, the Subilla principae Pantaleoni.

A species of antlion endemic to Tunisia and Sardinia, the Maria Matilde antlion, was named in her honor (Myrmeleon mariaemathildae Pantaleoni, Cesaroni & Nicoli Aldini, 2010).

== Selected publications ==
- The Nothochrysa italica Rossi and its singular habits, in Bulletin of the Italian Entomological Society, 75 (1943) pp. 117-118.
- Singular glandular structures in the thorax and abdomen of the males of some species of lacewing neuroptera, in Reports of the Accademia Nazionale dei Lincei, Class of Physical, Mathematical and Natural Science, s.8, v. 16 (1954) pp. 678-685.
- Behavior and biological cycle of a Cecidomiid dipteran, Putoniella marsupialis F. Lw., in Proceedings of the Academy of Sciences of the Institute of Bologna. Physical science class. Reports, s. 11, see 3 (1956) pp. 155-158.
- Integrated control methods in the defense of cultivated plants from attacks by arthropods, in Proceedings of the Accademia dei Georgofili, s. 7, see 9 (1962) pp. 65-83.
- Integrated protection and integrated production of agricultural crops: achievements and prospects, in Proceedings of the Accademia dei Georgofili, s. 7, see 39 (1992) pp. 439-464.
