= Pilar, Santa Fe =

Town in Santa Fe Province, Argentina

Pilar
- Location in Argentina
- Coordinates: 31°27′00″S 61°15′00″W
- Country: Argentina
- Province: (Santa Fe Province) Santa Fe
- Department: Las Colonias
- Founded: 1876

Government
  - Communal president: Carlos Martínez

Area
  - Total: 172 km^{2} (66 sq mi)
- Elevation: 49 m (161 ft)

Population (2022 census [INDEC])
  - Total: 5,310
- CPA Base: S 3085
- Area code: 3404

Pilar is a town in the Las Colonias Department of Santa Fe Province, Argentina. With 5000 inhabitants, its population obtains its resources, mostly from livestock farming and industries related to the sector and the metallurgical sector.

== History ==
Pilar was founded in 1876 by Swiss immigrant Guillermo Lehmann, however there is no record of a founding act. After the displacement of the indigenous population in the place by the entrance of the conquistadors, the lands would remain in the power of the State who would then transfer it to private hands and colonization companies by various means, either by payment for services, reward or collaboration to the government, being in this case, also repaid for the campaign organized to eradicate the "Indian" tribes of some areas of the province of Santa Fe.

Between 1864 and 1867 the Province of Santa Fe had contracted a loan with Mariano Cabal for being a supplier of supplies and food to the Argentine Army in the Paraguay War (1865–70). In compensation, the State ceded to Cabal in property and as a form of payment, five hundred leagues of "uncultivated lands" considered suitable for sowing thus becoming the first owner of these lands, according to the public land regime. Of which he would later sell to Lehmann and Cristian Claus on April 30, 1875, one hundred concessions numbered from 1 to 100.

...In the new Colony called Pilar, recently founded on the part of the land that, situated in this Province and Department of the Capital in the place called 'Las prusianas', composed of twelve square leagues, bordered on the north by Mr. Cullen and others; on the south by Messrs. Beck and Herzog; on the east by the fields occupied by Don Carlos H. Seguí, of the will of Elía; and on the west with fiscal land".

Subsequently in August they would buy another one hundred concessions contiguous to the previous ones and also included in the new colony of Pilar, numbered from 101 to 200. The remaining one hundred concessions from 201 to 300 were retained by their owner Agustín Cabal, son of Mariano Cabal, and sold as of June 1876, through Juan Bernardo Iturraspe, whom he empowered for this purpose.

Guillermo Lehmann and Cristian Claus began the land sales on September 24 and 25, 1875, however, after two years the colonizing partnership was dissolved when on April 29, 1877 Claus sold to Lehmann the land they had bought some time before from Cabal, expanding the territory of Nuevo Torino to the north and Pilar to the south. Totaling 480 concessions acquired by Lehmann.

As it happened in numerous cases in the province, the settlement of the colony of Pilar began without the formality of a founding act.

..."In the absence or non-existence of the Act of Foundation of a town or Colony, the General Archive of the Province holds the criterion of determining, in its replacement, another fact that possesses a similar meaning. That is to say, the act as a result of which the existence of such community is originated or set in motion" ...

In this way it is considered that the purchase of land made on April 30, 1875 by Guillermo Lehmann y Claus to Agustín Cabal, would be the act where the establishment of the colony is set in motion, because from that moment the settlers began to settle in the place; the verification of this execution can be verified in the report of January 1, 1876 in which the Inspector of Don Jonás Larguía, informs that eighteen concessions were sold in which twelve families were installed. Consequently, on April 30, 1875 the first families that would give rise to the Colonia de Pilar would begin to settle, the records determine the founding of the town of Pilar in 1876 because the first houses were erected in the latter year, although the day and month could not be assured due to the absence of documentation to assert it.

== Demographics ==
It has 5310 inhabitants, which represents an increase of 7.08% compared to the 4959 inhabitants.(Indec) The population data of 1869 extracted from the subsequent censuses of 1895, 1914 and 1947, may correspond to a later estimate of the time of its foundation.

Historical population
Year	Pop.	±%
1869	675	—
1895	1,064	+57.6%
1914	2,085	+96.0%
1947	2,508	+20.3%
1960	3,909	+55.9%
1970	3,520	−10.0%
1980	4,150	+17.9%
1991	3,932	−5.3%
2001	4,545	+15.6%
2010	4,959	+9.1%
2022		—
