= Sotomayor =

Sotomayor is a Galician surname. Notable people with the surname include:

== Arts and entertainment ==
- Carlos Sotomayor (1911–1988), Chilean painter
- Chris Sotomayor, artist who works as a colorist in the comics industry
- Fernando Álvarez de Sotomayor y Zaragoza (1875–1960), Galician painter
- Liesel Holler Sotomayor, Miss Peru 2004
- Michael Hennet Sotomayor (born 1983), member of the boyband D'NASH
- Tommy Sotomayor (born 1975), American radio show host and YouTube personality

== Sports ==
- Javier Sotomayor (born 1967), Cuban high jumper
- Víctor Sotomayor (born 1968), retired Argentine football player
- Nelson Piquet Souto Maior (born 1952), retired Brazilian Formula One World Champion

== Other fields ==
- Martín Álvarez de Sotomayor (1723–1819), Viceroy of Navarre between 1788 and 1790
- Sonia Sotomayor (born 1954), U.S. Supreme Court justice
- Sylvia Sotomayor, creator of Kēlen, a constructed language

== See also ==
- Soutomaior, a municipality in Galicia, Spain
- Souto Maior (disambiguation)
- Soutomayor, a town in Santa Fe Province, Argentina
