= Omar Merlo =

Argentine-born Chilean footballer (born 1987)

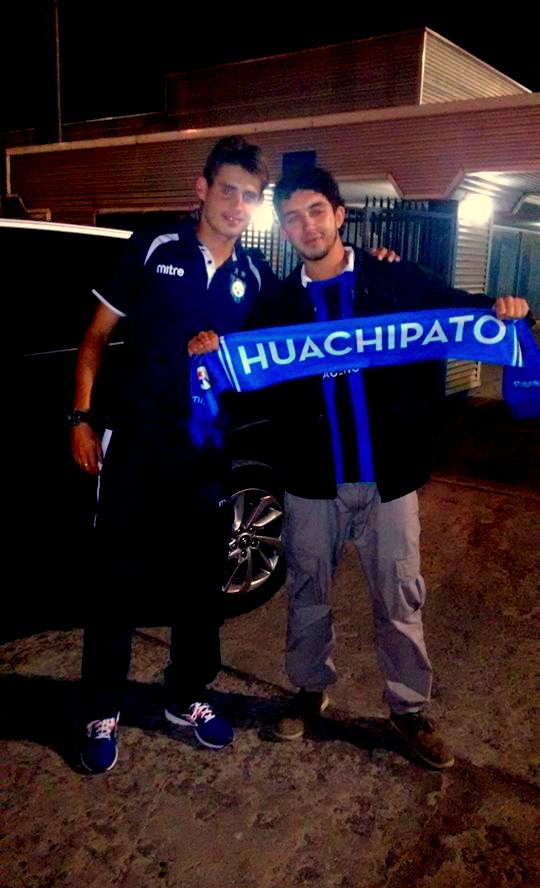
- Merlo allowing himself to be photographed with a steelworker fan

Personal information
- Full name: Omar Jesús Merlo
- Date of birth: 12 June 1987 (age 39)
- Place of birth: Santa Clara de Buena Vista, Santa Fe, Argentina
- Height: 1.82 m (6 ft 0 in)
- Position: Centre-back

Youth career
- 2001–2007: Colón

Senior career*
Years	Team	Apps	(Gls)
2007–2010	Colón	25	(1)
2008	→ River Plate (loan)	2	(1)
2010	Platense	5	(0)
2011	Unión San Felipe	36	(2)
2012–2017	Huachipato	163	(6)
2018–2022	Sporting Cristal	41	(1)
2023	Curicó Unido	20	(1)
Total		292	(12)
- * Club domestic league appearances and goals

Omar Jesús Merlo (Spanish pronunciation: [oˈmaɾ ˈmeɾlo]; born 12 June 1987) is a former Argentine naturalized Chilean professional footballer who played as a centre-back.

== Career ==
Merlo made his first team debut for Colón in 2006 and quickly established himself as a regular member of the first team squad. In February 2008, he signed up with powerhouse team River Plate, where he won the Torneo Clausura. Seasons later, Merlo was a key player at the squad of Primera División club Huachipato that earned 2012 Torneo Clausura, scoring the winning penalty in the final.

In January 2024, he announced his retirement after playing for Curicó Unido in the 2023 Chilean Primera División.

== Personal life ==
Merlo naturalized Chilean by residence when he was a player of Huachipato.

== Honours ==
River Plate

- Torneo Clausura (1): 2008 Clausura

Huachipato

- Primera División de Chile (1): 2012 Clausura

Sporting Cristal

- Peruvian Primera División (1): 2020
- Copa Bicentenario (1): 2021
- Torneo Apertura (1): 2021
- Torneo Clausura; runner-up: 2020
