= Hipatia, Argentina =

Town in Santa Fe Province, Argentina

Hipatia
- Location in Argentina
- Coordinates: 31°07′34″S 61°01′55″W
- Country: Argentina
- Province: (Santa Fe Province) Santa Fe
- Department: Las Colonias

Population (2010 census [INDEC])
  - Total: 548
- CPA Base: S 3023

Hipatia is a town in the Las Colonias Department of Santa Fe Province, Argentina. It is located approximately 4.2 kilometers (2.60 miles) from the town of Progreso, Argentina.
