= Providencia =

Providencia may refer to:

- Providencia, Argentina, a town in Santa Fe Province, Argentina
- Providencia, Chile, a commune in the Santiago Province
- Providencia District in Amazonas, Peru
- Providencia Island, part of the San Andrés y Providencia Department district of Colombia in the Caribbean sea
- Providencia, Nariño a town in municipality in southern Colombia
- Providencia (bacterium) a Gram-negative bacterial genus
- Rancho La Providencia and successor, Providencia Ranch, California
