= Cavour =

Cavour usually refers to Camillo Benso, Count of Cavour (1810–1861), Italian politician who was a leading figure in the unification of Italy and became Italy's first Prime Minister. It may also refer to eponymous places and ships, among others.

== Places ==
=== Argentina ===
- Colonia Cavour, Argentina

=== Italy ===
- Cavour, Piedmont
- Cavour (Rome Metro)
- Ponte Cavour, a bridge in Rome
- Via Cavour (disambiguation), a street in Rome and Florence

=== United States ===
- Cavour, South Dakota
- Cavour, Wisconsin

== Ships ==
- Italian aircraft carrier Cavour (550), commissioned in 2008
- Italian battleship Conte di Cavour, commissioned in 1915
- SS Florida (1905), a ship renamed Cavour in 1912

== Other uses ==
- Liceo classico Cavour, a school in Turin
- Cavor, a character in the novel The First Men in the Moon
