= Horacio Humoller =

Argentine footballer

Personal information
- Full name: Horacio Aldo Humoller Hang
- Date of birth: 12 December 1966 (age 59)
- Place of birth: Humboldt, Santa Fe, Argentina
- Height: 1.78 m (5 ft 10 in)
- Position: Defender

Senior career*
Years	Team	Apps	(Gls)
1985–1990	Unión de Santa Fe		
1990–1995	Toluca	154	(2)
1995–1996	Atlante	43	(0)
1997–2002	Talleres		
2002–2003	Unión de Santa Fe	18	(0)
- * Club domestic league appearances and goals

Horacio Aldo Humoller Hang (born 12 December 1966 in Humboldt, Santa Fe) is a retired Argentine football defender who played for several clubs in Argentina and Mexico, including Unión de Santa Fe and Deportivo Toluca F.C.
