= Matilde, Argentina =

Town in Santa Fe Province, Argentina

Matilde
- Location in Argentina
- Coordinates: 31°48′00″S 60°58′59.9″W
- Country: Argentina
- Province: (Santa Fe Province) Santa Fe
- Department: Las Colonias
- Founded: 20 September 1890

Government
  - Communal president: Lucas Saldaño

Area
  - Total: 128 km^{2} (49 sq mi)

Population (2010 census [INDEC])
  - Total: 947
- CPA Base: S 3013

Matilde is a town in the Las Colonias Department of Santa Fe Province, Argentina.

== History ==
The settlement of Plaza Matilde was established in 1879. In 1889, when the railway line from Buenos Aires to Santa Fe was being built, the train station was built three kilometers to the east of the settlement. This shifted population growth to near the train station, as it became the most important center in the area. On 20 September 1890, the first train passed through Estación Matilde. This date came to be known as the founding day of the present-day town based at the now-defunct station.
