= Santa María Centro =

Town in Santa Fe Province, Argentina

- Location in Argentina
- Coordinates: 31°31′17″S 61°18′46″W
- Country: Argentina
- Province: (Santa Fe Province) Santa Fe
- Department: Las Colonias
- Founded: 16 June 1869

Population (2010 census [INDEC])
  - Total: 187
- CPA Base: S3011
- Area code: 03404

Santa María Centro is a town in the Las Colonias Department of Santa Fe Province, Argentina.
