= Grutly =

Locality in Santa Fe Province, Argentina

- Locality
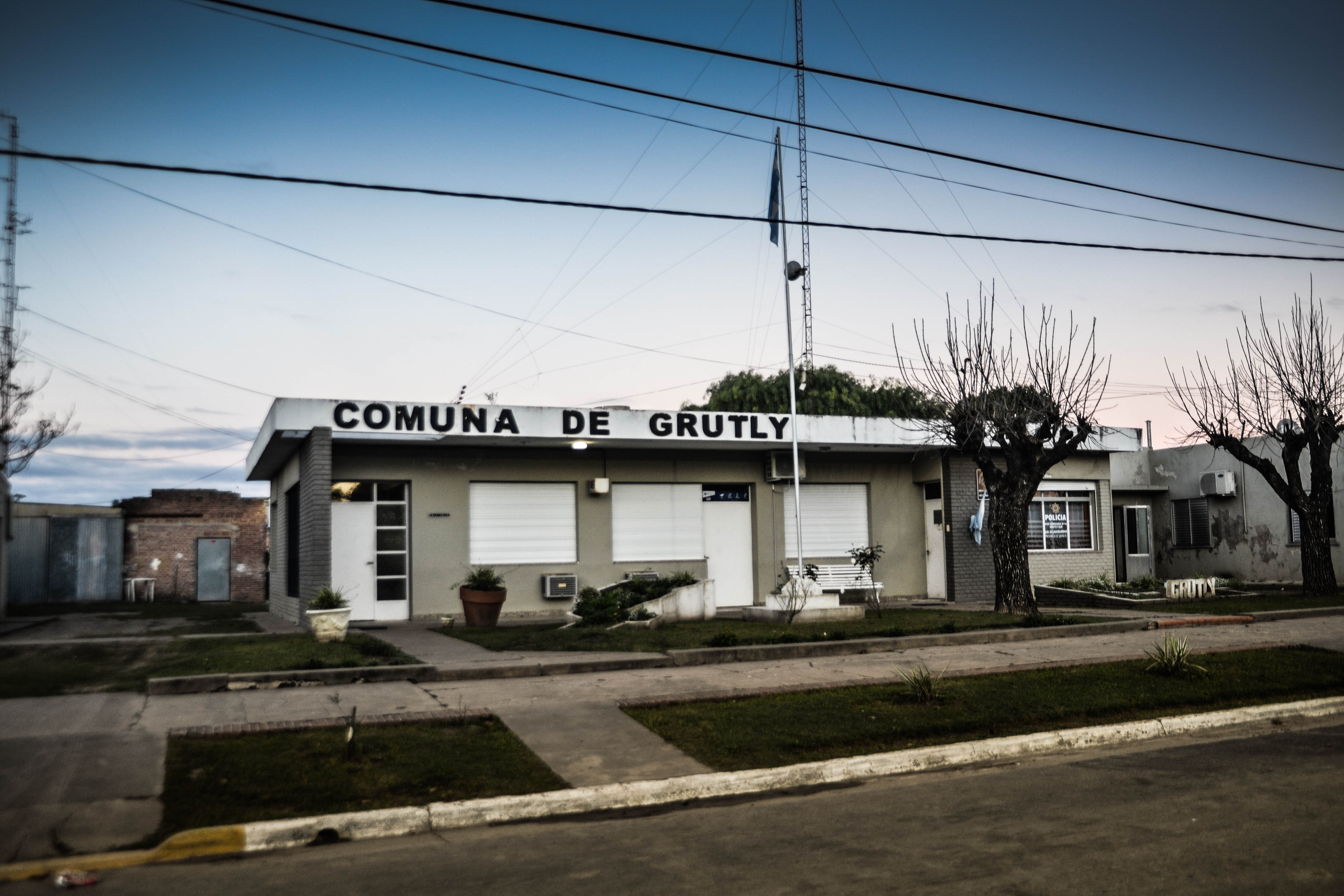

- Location of Grutly Grutly (Argentina)
- Coordinates: 31°16′11″S 61°04′15″W
- Country: Argentina
- Province: Santa Fe
- Department: Las Colonias
- Foundation: 1869

Government
  - Communal President: Víctor Beltramino

Population (2010)
  - Total: 932
- Time zone: UTC−3 (ART)
- CPA base: S

Grutly is a locality in Las Colonias Department, in Santa Fe Province, in northeastern Argentina. It was founded in 1869.

== History ==
Grutly was founded by Swiss and Italian settlers in 1869. Its name derives from the Swiss mountain meadow named Rütli.
