= María Luisa, Argentina =

Town in Santa Fe Province, Argentina

María Luisa
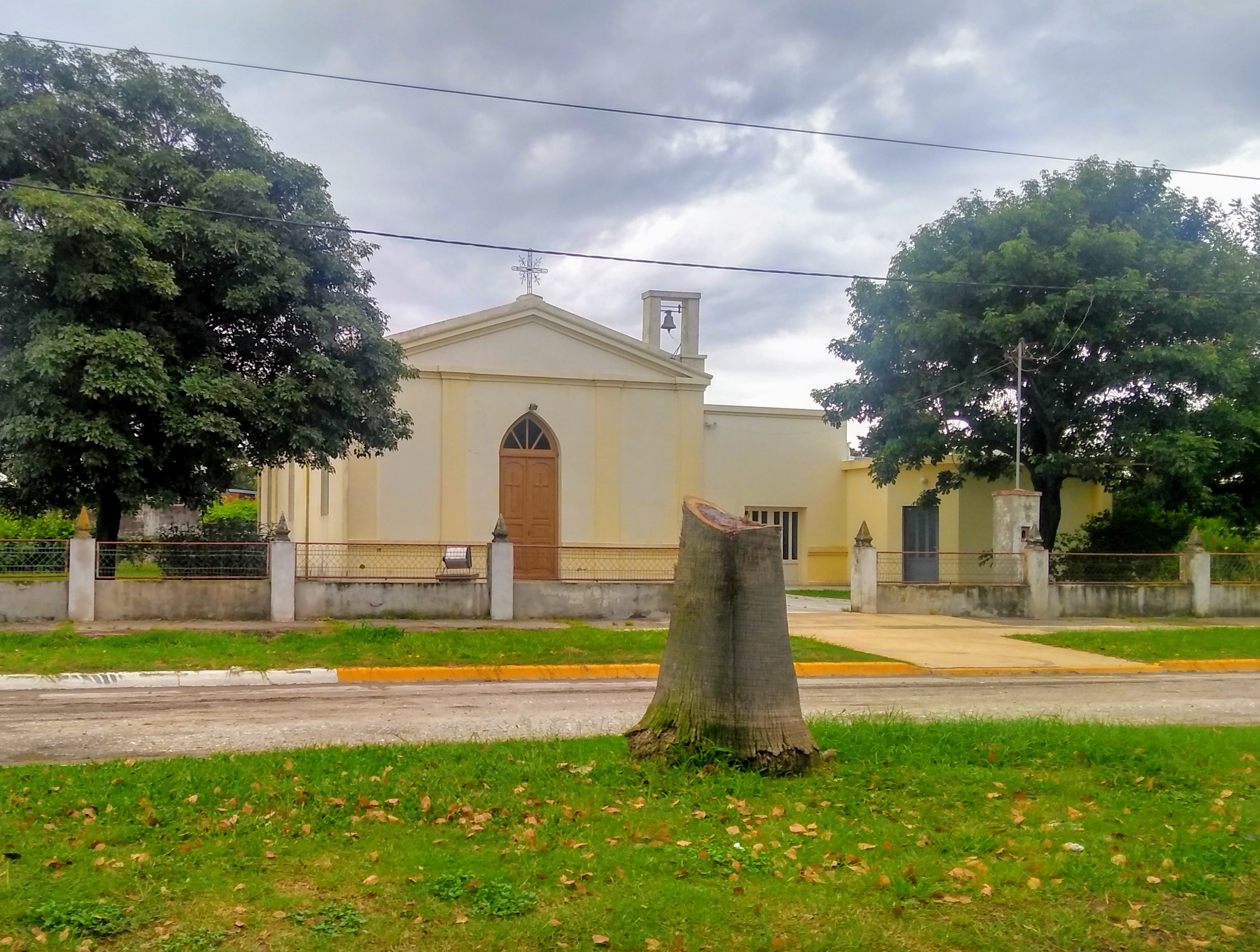
- San José Chapel in María Luisa, pictured in 2019

- Location in Argentina
- Coordinates: 31°00′40″S 60°54′36″W
- Country: Argentina
- Province: (Santa Fe Province) Santa Fe
- Department: Las Colonias
- Founded: 1883

Government
  - Communal president: Andrés Calvo (FPCyS)

Population (2010 census [INDEC])
  - Total: 746
- CPA Base: S 3025

María Luisa is a town in the Las Colonias Department of Santa Fe Province, Argentina.
