= Empalme San Carlos =

Town in Santa Fe Province, Argentina

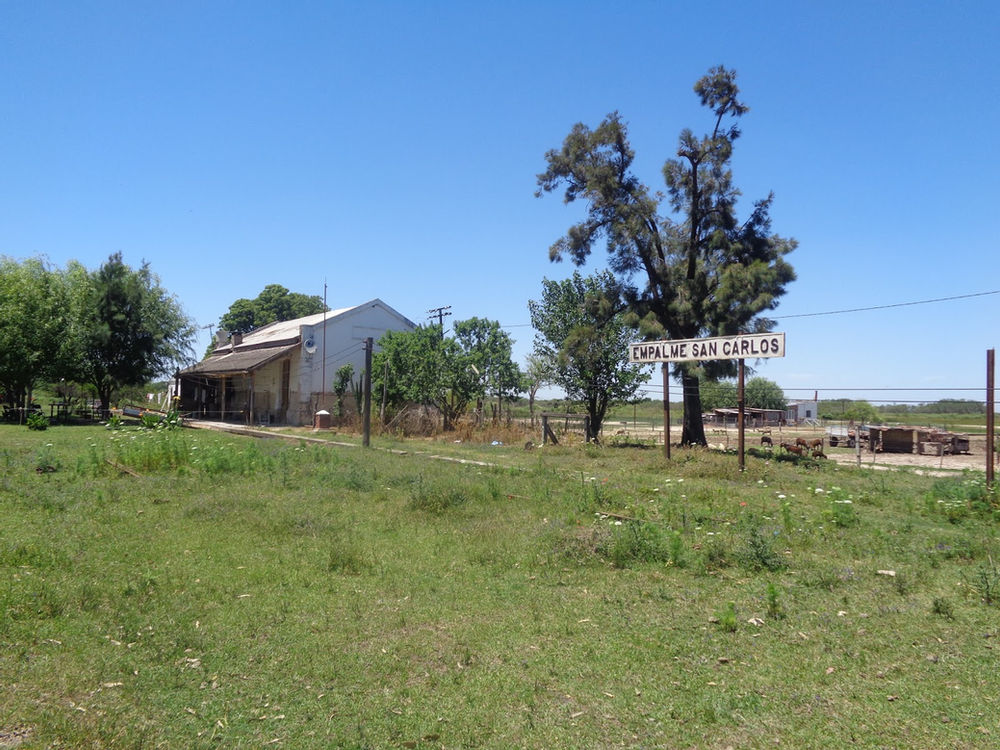
- Former railway station in Empalme San Carlos, pictured in 2021

- Location in Argentina
- Coordinates: 31°32′49″S 60°48′47″W
- Country: Argentina
- Province: (Santa Fe Province) Santa Fe
- Department: Las Colonias

Government
  - Communal president: Hugo Heizen (PDP–FPCyS)

Area
  - Total: 104 km^{2} (40 sq mi)

Population (2010 census [INDEC])
  - Total: 357
- CPA Base: S 3007

Empalme San Carlos is a town in the Las Colonias Department of Santa Fe Province, Argentina.
