= Emiliano Sala =

Argentine footballer (1990–2019)

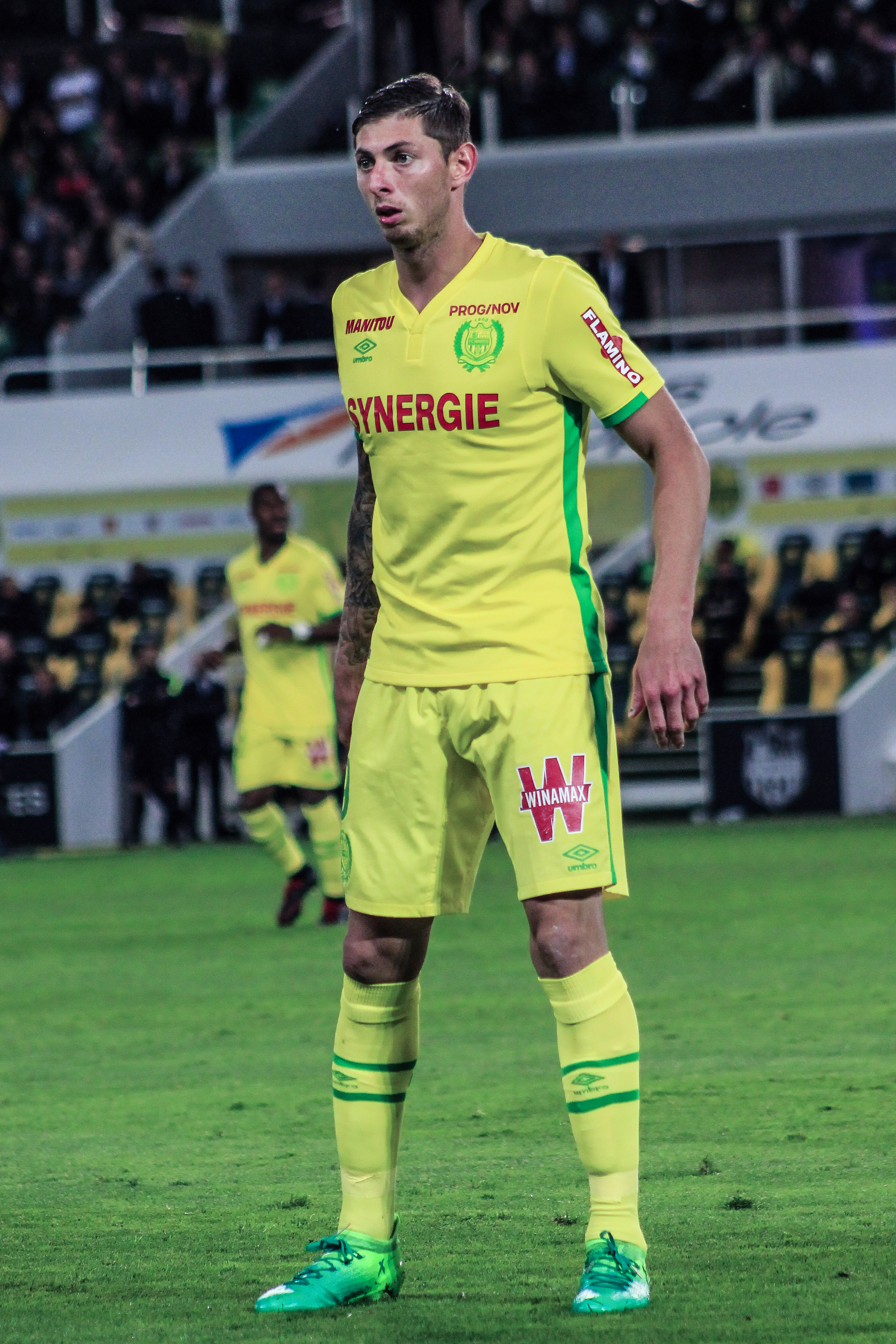
- Sala playing for Nantes in 2017

Personal information
- Full name: Emiliano Raúl Sala Taffarel
- Date of birth: 31 October 1990
- Place of birth: Cululú, Argentina
- Date of death: 21 January 2019 (aged 28)
- Place of death: English Channel, off Alderney, Channel Islands
- Height: 1.87 m (6 ft 2 in)
- Position: Striker

Youth career
- 1994–2005: Club San Martín de Progreso
- 2005–2007: Proyecto Crecer

Senior career*
Years	Team	Apps	(Gls)
2007–2008	Soledad B	6	(1)
2009	FC Crato	1	(2)
2010–2015	Bordeaux	11	(1)
2012–2013	→ Orléans (loan)	37	(19)
2013–2014	→ Niort (loan)	37	(18)
2015	→ Caen (loan)	13	(5)
2015–2019	Nantes	120	(42)
2019	Cardiff City	0	(0)
Total		225	(88)
- * Club domestic league appearances and goals

Emiliano Raúl Sala Taffarel (Spanish pronunciation: [emiˈljano ˈsala]; 31 October 1990 – 21 January 2019) was an Argentine professional footballer who played as a striker.

After playing youth football in Argentina and following a short spell in Portugal's regional leagues, Sala began his professional career in France with Bordeaux, making his professional debut in February 2012. After struggling to break into the first team, he was loaned out to Championnat National side Orléans and Ligue 2 side Niort in consecutive seasons. He enjoyed prolific spells with both clubs, scoring 39 goals between them, before returning to Bordeaux. After initially being promised an increased role after his successful loans, Sala fell out of favour again, and instead, joined fellow Ligue 1 side Caen on loan.

In 2015, he signed for Nantes on a permanent basis. With Nantes, he made more than 100 appearances in Ligue 1, and achieved a successful goalscoring record, finishing as the club's top goalscorer for three consecutive seasons. His form prompted a move to Cardiff City in January 2019, for a club record fee of £15 million (€18 million).

Sala was killed in a plane crash off Alderney on 21 January 2019. He was a passenger aboard a Piper Malibu light aircraft flying from Nantes to Cardiff. An initial three-day search that covered 4,400 square kilometres (1,700 sq mi) across the English Channel failed to locate the crash site. Two subsequent private searches were launched, resulting in the discovery of the wreckage on 3 February 2019. Sala's body was recovered four days later. The aftermath of the incident led to widespread tributes from the football community, and regulatory scrutiny regarding unlicensed commercial flights.

== Early and personal life ==
Emiliano Raúl Sala Taffarel was born in the town of Cululú, Santa Fe Province. He was born prematurely, with concerns that the respiratory issues might prevent him from being able to run. He held an Italian passport.

His father worked as a truck driver, and the family later moved to Progreso, where Sala was raised. He was a fan of Independiente, and, growing up, studied footage of his favourite footballer, Argentine international Gabriel Batistuta. Sala's parents were separated at the time of his death, and his father died of a heart attack on 26 April 2019, three months later. Sala is survived by his mother and two younger siblings, sister Romina and brother Dario.

He is described as having been "far removed from the typical image of a star footballer." In France, he settled in Carquefou, a small town outside of Nantes, and would spend his free time with friends made there or walking his rescue dog, Nala. A local fan recalled that Sala went around town to personally say goodbye to everyone when he was set to transfer to Cardiff. Having had a close relationship with his family and Argentine friends, in his hometown of Progreso, he continues to be affectionately known as "el Emi"; matching murals of him were commissioned from the same artist in Progreso and Carquefou.

== Career ==
=== Early career ===
Sala began playing football for San Martín de Progreso, where he remained until he was 15 years old. He then moved to San Francisco, Córdoba to play at football school Proyecto Crecer after being spotted by a scout. The club was directly affiliated with Spanish club RCD Mallorca and French side FC Girondins de Bordeaux, scouting local players in the area. After joining the club, he moved into a boarding house with other players from the club's youth system. He played six Preferente matches for Spanish club CD Soledad B between October 2007 and February 2008.

In 2009, while living in Granada, Spain, he was recommended to Portuguese District side FC Crato by a fellow Argentinian footballer who played there and joined the Portuguese team. Sala played one official match for Crato, scoring twice, but suddenly decided to leave the club and return to Argentina, saying that his girlfriend was "in trouble" in his homeland.

=== Bordeaux ===
At the age of 20, during the 2010–11 season, Sala moved to Europe to sign for Bordeaux, the French partner club from Proyecto Crecer. After arriving in France, Sala briefly lived with the club's youth coach Marcelo Vada and his son, Sala's teammate, Valentín Vada, who were from the same region of Argentina.

Having progressed through the club's reserve team, Sala grew frustrated with his lack of first-team playing time, and his agent offered him to several Italian clubs, including Sorrento, but this was rejected in each case. On 8 February 2012, Sala made his Bordeaux senior competitive debut in the 2011–12 Coupe de France round of 16 3–1 away defeat against Olympique Lyonnais, coming on as a substitute in the 105th minute for Jussiê.

Unable to establish himself in the first team, Bordeaux hoped to loan Sala out in order to gain experience and he was expected to sign for a team in Spain before his agent rejected the move, wanting Sala to remain in France. He instead joined Championnat National side US Orléans on loan after being spotted by manager Oliver Frapolli a year previously. Frapolli described Sala as "the best player on the team, without question", as he went on to score nineteen goals for the club in 37 appearances. He helped the club to an eighth-place finish in the Championnat National.

On 2 July 2013, Sala agreed a deal to join Ligue 2 club Chamois Niortais on loan for the entire 2013–14 season. He enjoyed a steady return through the first half of the season before finding form in March, scoring eleven goals in his final twelve appearances including scoring his first career hat-trick in a 4–2 victory over Stade Lavallois. He finished the season with 20 goals in all competitions, with his total of 18 league goals setting a new club record for goals in a single season.

At the start of the 2014–15 season, Sala was brought into the first team squad with Bordeaux by manager Willy Sagnol and was rewarded with a two-year extension to his contract. He scored his first senior goal for the club after converting a penalty during a 4–1 defeat to Monaco. However, it proved to be his only goal in eleven appearances, and he was loaned to SM Caen, another Ligue 1 club, for the second half of the 2014–15 season as a replacement for Mathieu Duhamel. Caen had previously tried to sign Sala at the start of the season but had been rejected by Bordeaux. He made his debut for Caen on 1 February 2015 in a 1–0 victory over Saint-Étienne. He scored his first goal for the club in his third appearance, during a 2–2 draw with Paris Saint-Germain two weeks later, and scored a brace against RC Lens in his following match. He scored five goals for Caen during his loan spell before returning to Bordeaux.

=== Nantes ===
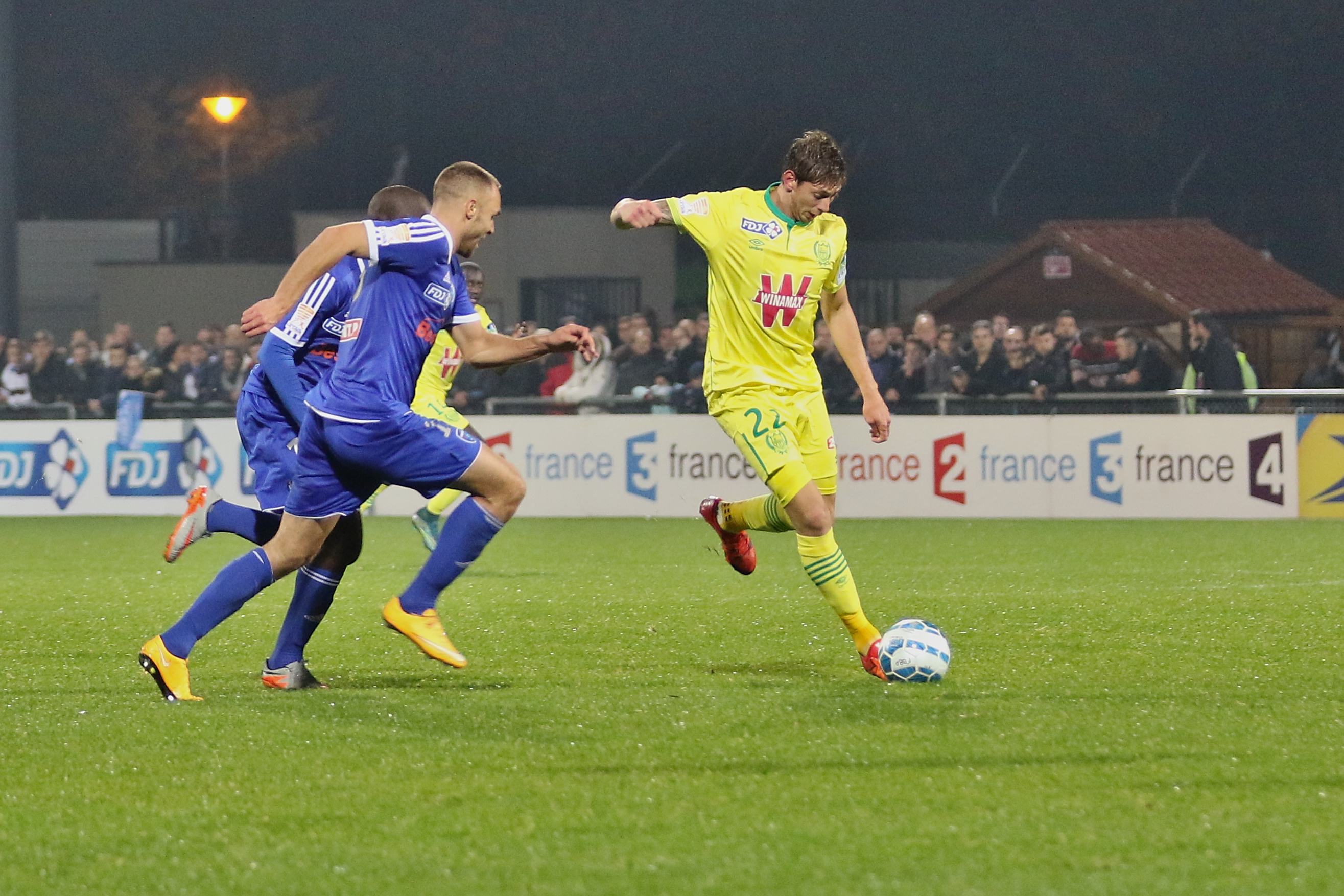
Sala (right) playing for Nantes in 2015

On 20 July 2015, Sala joined Ligue 1 club Nantes on a five-year contract with Nantes paying a reported transfer fee of €1 million to Bordeaux. He made his debut for Nantes on the opening day of the 2015–16 season, during a 1–0 victory over Guingamp, and scored his first goal for the club on 5 December 2015 in a 1–1 draw with Ajaccio. In January 2016, Nantes rejected a bid of £3 million from Wolverhampton Wanderers for Sala. In his first season, despite scoring only six times, he finished the year as the club's top goalscorer.

During his second season, Sala scored twelve league goals for Nantes, the highest scoring player in a single season for the club since Olivier Monterrubio in 2000–01. He equaled his tally again in the 2017–18 season, finishing as Nantes' top scorer for the third consecutive season since his arrival at the club.

At the start of the 2018–19 season, Sala fell out of favour under new manager Miguel Cardoso who preferred Kalifa Coulibaly as the club's first choice striker. Turkish side Galatasaray made a late bid to sign Sala on the last day of the summer transfer window but the move later collapsed. Sala twice made goalscoring appearances as a substitute and was restored to the starting line up under Cardoso before the manager was sacked in October 2018. Vahid Halilhodžić was appointed as the club's new manager and in his first match in charge, on 20 October 2018, Sala scored a hat-trick in a 4–0 Ligue 1 home win over Toulouse. He thus became the first FC Nantes player to score three goals in a Ligue 1 match since Mamadou Diallo did so against FC Sochaux-Montbéliard in February 2006. At the end of October, he was voted Ligue 1 Player of the Month having scored four goals in three matches during the month.

Sala's good form saw him as the joint-highest goalscorer in Ligue 1 at the start of December, his tally of twelve goals tied with Paris Saint-Germain's Kylian Mbappé. On 5 December, Sala scored his last goal for the club in a 3–2 Ligue 1 home victory over Olympique de Marseille. On 16 January 2019, he played his final match for the club in a 1–0 Ligue 1 away defeat against Nîmes Olympique.

In 2021, it was announced that a pre-season tournament would be held in July in Sala's honour, with Nantes, Bordeaux, Caen and Niort invited to play by former Orléans goalkeeper and ex-teammate of Sala, Thomas Renault.

=== Cardiff City ===
On 19 January 2019, Sala joined Premier League side Cardiff City on a three-and-a-half-year deal for a club record transfer fee, reported to be £15 million. The transfer beat the previous club record of £11 million paid for Gary Medel in 2013. As part of a sell-on clause, 50% of the transfer fee was due to his first professional club Bordeaux. Sala rejected a late bid from a club in the Chinese Super League to join Cardiff, despite being offered a higher salary, due to his desire to play in the Premier League. Following Sala's death, Nantes demanded the transfer fee from Cardiff. In September 2019, FIFA ruled in Nantes' favour and ordered Cardiff to pay a first instalment of €6 million (£5.3 million), and the remainder the following January. In August 2022 the Court of Arbitration for Sport ruled that the first instalment has to be paid. On 30 June 2023, Cardiff City were ordered by FIFA to pay Nantes the transfer balance for Sala. The sum was reportedly more than €11 million (£9.45 million), and was required to fulfil the €17 million agreed between the two clubs.

== Style of play ==
Sala stated that he modelled his style on his idol, former Argentine international forward Gabriel Batistuta. BBC Sport compared Sala to Jamie Vardy, describing him as "a player who likes wide spaces and being part of a team that has a strong counter-attacking style." A large and powerful striker, he was also recognised for his ability to hold the ball up and was described as possessing "reasonable" pace; he also drew praise in the media for his work-rate, tenacity, eye for goal, and finishing ability.

== Disappearance and death ==
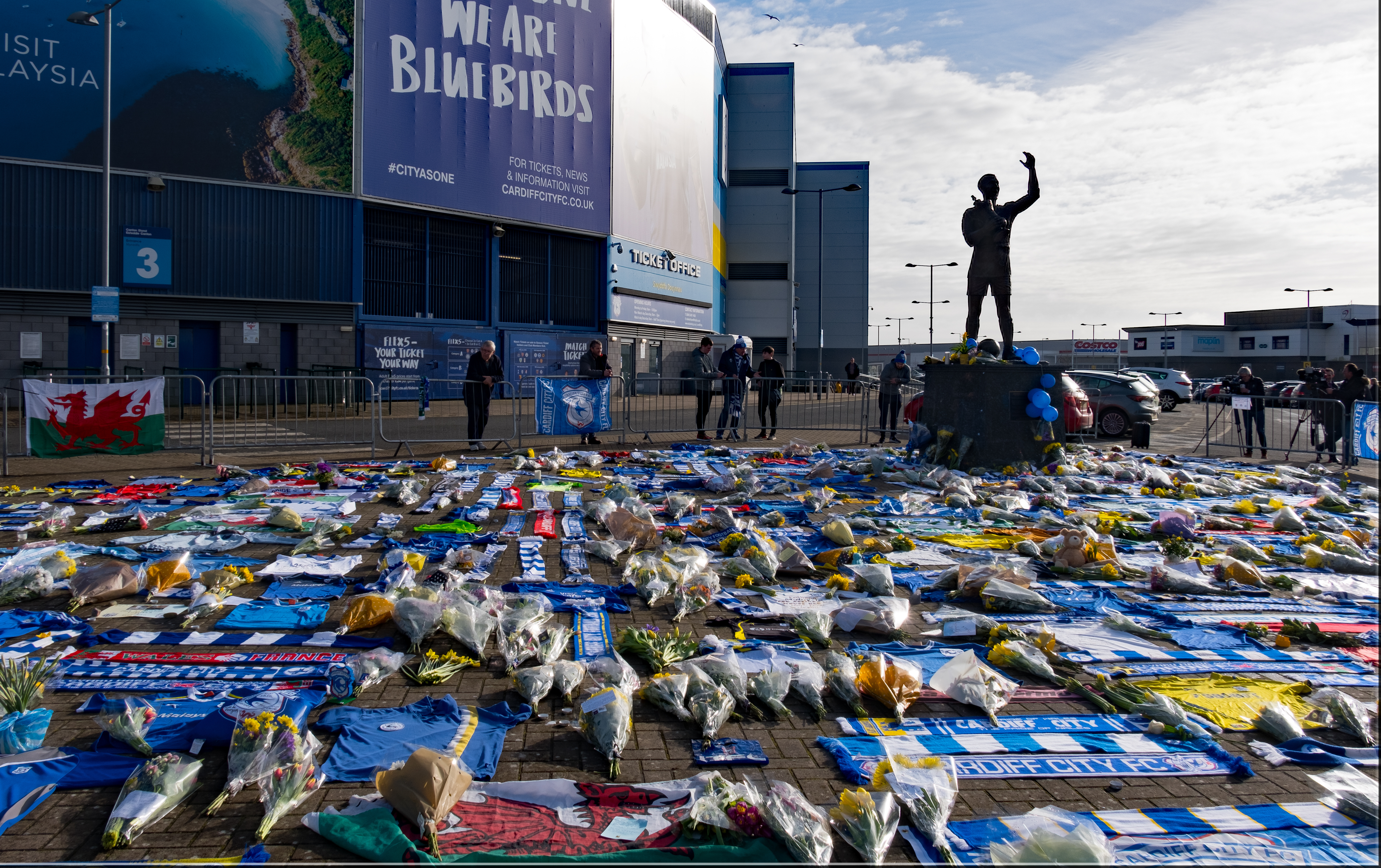
Tributes laid outside the Cardiff City Stadium following Sala's disappearance

After completing his medical at Cardiff, Sala returned to Nantes on Saturday 19 January, on a plane arranged by football agent Mark McKay. His intention was to return to Cardiff on Monday 21 January, in order to attend his first training session with his new club the following morning. Sala had been invited to attend Cardiff's match against Newcastle United by manager Neil Warnock, but he returned to France to say goodbye to his Nantes teammates and collect personal belongings.

On 21 January, the Piper Malibu aircraft, which was flying Sala from Nantes to Cardiff, disappeared off Alderney. The same aircraft and pilot had flown Sala to Nantes two days earlier. On 23 January, Channel Islands Air Search reported that there was "no hope" of finding any survivors in the water.

An audio message, allegedly sent from the plane by Sala to his friends via WhatsApp, was released by Argentine media outlet Olé. The audio message translates as follows:

Hello, my brothers, how are you? Boy, I’m tired. I was here in Nantes taking care of things, things, things, things, things, things, and it never stops, it never stops, it never stops. Anyway, guys, I’m up in this plane that feels like it's falling to pieces, and I’m going to Cardiff. [It's] crazy, we start tomorrow. Training in the afternoon, guys, in my new team... Let's see what happens. So, how's it going with you guys? All good? If in an hour and a half you have no news from me, I don't know if they are going to send someone to look for me because they cannot find me, but you will know... Man, I'm scared!

Guernsey Police initially searched for three days about 4,400 km^{2} (1,700 sq mi) across the English Channel. At 15:15 GMT on 24 January 2019, after a "very thorough and extensive search" including eighty hours of combined searching undertaken by three planes, five helicopters and two lifeboats, the police announced that they had called off the search. The decision led to calls worldwide for the search to continue, including numerous other footballers, among them fellow Argentine players Lionel Messi, Gonzalo Higuaín, Sergio Agüero and former player Diego Maradona. The president of Argentina, Mauricio Macri, stated his intention to request the British and French governments to resume the search. An online petition also attracted over 65,000 signatures and Sala's family later announced their decision to fund a private search. Over £280,000 was raised for this search on GoFundMe started by Sports Cover, a sports agency that represented Sala. The funds enabled the private search to commence on 26 January, with the launch of two boats, led by marine scientist David Mearns.

On 28 January, plans were announced for an underwater search using an unmanned remotely operated underwater vehicle (ROV) to search an area of seabed north of Hurd's Deep. On 29 January, Cardiff City included Sala on the team sheet for their game against Arsenal, with a daffodil next to his name in place of a squad number. On 30 January, the Air Accidents Investigation Branch (AAIB) reported finding two seat cushions washed up on a French beach, believed to be from the missing aircraft.

On 3 February, another underwater search for the aircraft began, using the AAIB's Geo Ocean III vessel and a privately funded vessel to conduct sonar surveys of the seabed covering 14 square kilometres (4 square nautical miles), about 44 km (24 nmi) north of Guernsey. At approximately 21:11 GMT, six hours after the new search began, wreckage from the aircraft was found at a depth of 63 metres (205 feet; 35 fathoms). On 4 February, investigators stated that there was one body visible inside the wreckage.

On 7 February, the body was recovered from the wreckage and taken to the Isle of Portland to be passed to the Dorset coroner. Later that day, Dorset Police identified the body as Sala's by means of fingerprint evidence. Nantes subsequently retired his former number 9 jersey. On 11 February, the results of a post mortem reported that Sala had died of "head and trunk injuries". Sala's body was taken back to Argentina on 15 February 2019 and his funeral was held, in his hometown of Progreso, the following day. On 25 February, a Special Bulletin was issued by the AAIB, giving a radar track of final section of flight including photographs of the wreckage on the sea-bed. It examined, in some detail, the regulatory framework for the accident flight.

On 28 February, ex-football agent Willie McKay, who had arranged the flight, said that Sala had been "abandoned" by Cardiff City and was left to arrange his own travel. McKay's son Mark was Nantes' acting agent in the deal for Sala. The football club said they "strongly reject" the claim they neglected to provide Sala with travel arrangements. On 29 April, two people were arrested after a photograph purporting to show the dead body of Emiliano Sala during a post-mortem was posted on Twitter.

On 19 June 2019, Dorset Police announced that they had arrested a man on suspicion of manslaughter by an unlawful act in respect of the death of Sala. His identity was not made public, but several newspapers identified the man as pilot David Henderson, who arranged the flight and had originally intended to fly the plane. On 14 August, it was reported that toxicology tests on Sala's body showed high levels of exposure to carbon monoxide, and the AAIB considered it was likely that the pilot would also have been exposed to the gas, potentially leading to drowsiness or unconsciousness.

On 13 March 2020, the AAIB determined that the pilot lost control of the aircraft while manoeuvring to avoid cloud at an excessive airspeed, causing an in-flight breakup, and that the carbon monoxide leaking into the cabin had likely rendered Sala unconscious and impaired the pilot's judgement. The AAIB found that the pilot and operator were not licensed to conduct commercial charter flights, and a contributing factor in the crash was the operator's failure to follow the higher operational standards required for commercial flying. On 11 March 2020, it was reported that no further action would be taken against Henderson. However, in October 2021, Henderson was prosecuted and found guilty of arranging a flight without permission or authorisation and of endangering the safety of an aircraft.

In September 2022, the BBC released recordings of the pilot, David Ibbotson, who also died in the crash, saying "I'll be wearing my life jacket" on the journey from France to Wales. He had also stated to friends that the 35-year-old airplane was "dodgy". The recordings further revealed what Ibbotson said about a previous flight in the same aircraft:

I'm flying along and then "boom". I thought, "what's wrong?" So I put everything forward and checked my parameters, everything was good and it was still flying, but it got your attention ... That Malibu, occasionally you've got like a mist every so often. You can feel it, very, very low throughout the airframe.

In 2021, a competition called the Challenge Emiliano Sala was created in honour of Sala. It was contested between four of Sala's former clubs in France, with Bordeaux winning the first title.

== Career statistics ==
Appearances and goals by club, season and competition
Club	Season	League			Coupe de France		Coupe de la Ligue		Total	
Club	Season	Division	Apps	Goals	Apps	Goals	Apps	Goals	Apps	Goals
Crato	2009–10	Portalegre First Division	1	2	—		—		1	2
Orléans (loan)	2012–13	Championnat National	37	19	0	0	0	0	37	19
Niort (loan)	2013–14	Ligue 2	37	18	2	2	1	0	40	20
Bordeaux	2014–15	Ligue 1	11	1	1	0	0	0	12	1
Caen (loan)	2014–15	Ligue 1	13	5	0	0	0	0	13	5
Nantes	2015–16	Ligue 1	31	6	3	0	1	0	35	6
Nantes	2016–17	Ligue 1	34	12	2	0	3	3	39	15
Nantes	2017–18	Ligue 1	36	12	2	2	0	0	38	14
Nantes	2018–19	Ligue 1	19	12	0	0	2	1	21	13
Nantes	Total		120	42	7	2	6	4	133	48
Career total			219	87	10	4	7	4	236	95

== Honours ==
Individual

- UNFP Ligue 1 Player of the Month: February 2015, October 2018
- Nantes Team of the Decade: 2010–2019

== See also ==
- Lists of solved missing person cases
