= San Agustín, Santa Fe =

Town in Santa Fe Province, Argentina

San Agustín
- Location in Argentina
- Coordinates: 31°40′55″S 60°56′24″W
- Country: Argentina
- Province: (Santa Fe Province) Santa Fe
- Department: Las Colonias
- Founded: 1870

Government
  - Communal president: Emiliano Monacá (PRO)
- Elevation: 33 m (108 ft)

Population (2010 census [INDEC])
  - Total: 1,017
- CPA Base: S 3017

San Agustín is a town in the Las Colonias Department of Santa Fe Province, Argentina. The town of San Agustín was founded between the years 1608 and 1612.

== History ==
San Agustín was founded in 1870 by Mariano Cabral.
