= Sa Pereira rail disaster =

Train wreck in Argentina in 1978

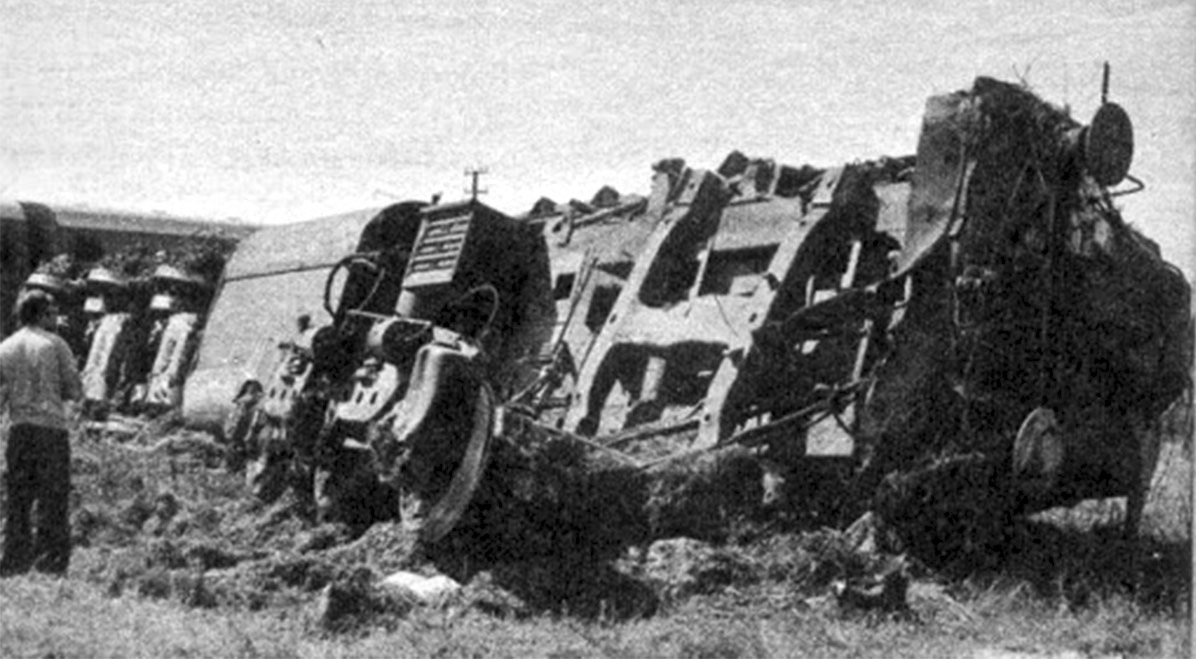
- The train after the impact

Details
- Date: 25 February 1978; 7:22 am
- Location: RN 19 level crossing, Sa Pereira; Santa Fe
- Country: Argentina
- Line: FC Mitre
- Operator: Ferrocarriles Argentinos
- Service: Tucumán–Retiro
- Incident type: Derailment
- Cause: Truck trespassing the level crossing

Statistics
- Trains: 1
- Vehicles: 1
- Passengers: 2,130
- Deaths: 55

The Sa Pereira accident was a train wreck in the city of Sa Pereira in Santa Fe Province which occurred on 25 February 1978, when a long-distance passenger train operated by Ferrocarriles Argentinos crashed into a truck at a level crossing between the General Mitre Railway and RN 19 highway in Sa Pereira.

Leaving 55 people dead, it was the worst rail tragedy in the province of Santa Fe, and the second-deadliest accident in the history of rail transport in Argentina, after the Benavídez rail disaster of 1970 which left 236 dead.

== Overview ==
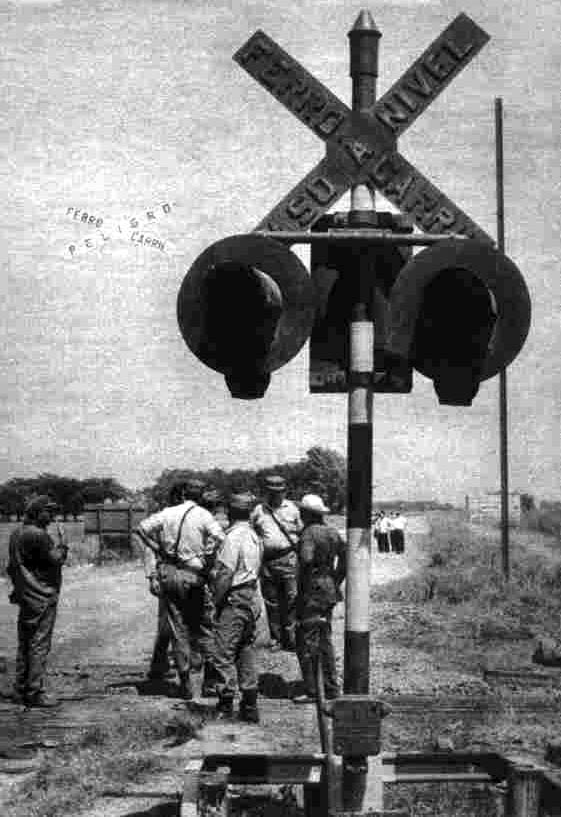
Flashing lights and bells were ignored by the truck driver, causing the accident

The incident happened at 7:22 am on Saturday February 25, 1978, when in the middle of the sound of the siren announcing an approaching train, a Ford F-600 truck carrying a load of 25,000 kg of edible fat and cans, drove through the level crossing despite the red flashing lights and the sound of the bell indicating the approaching train.

The truck, owned by meat packing industry "Santa Elena" and driven by 35-year-old Arnaldo Ruben Bianchini, was hit by the Estrella del Norte ("Northern Star", as the passenger service was called) that had departed from San Miguel de Tucumán towards Retiro Station (terminus of the line). At the moment of the impact, the train was carrying 2,130 passengers.

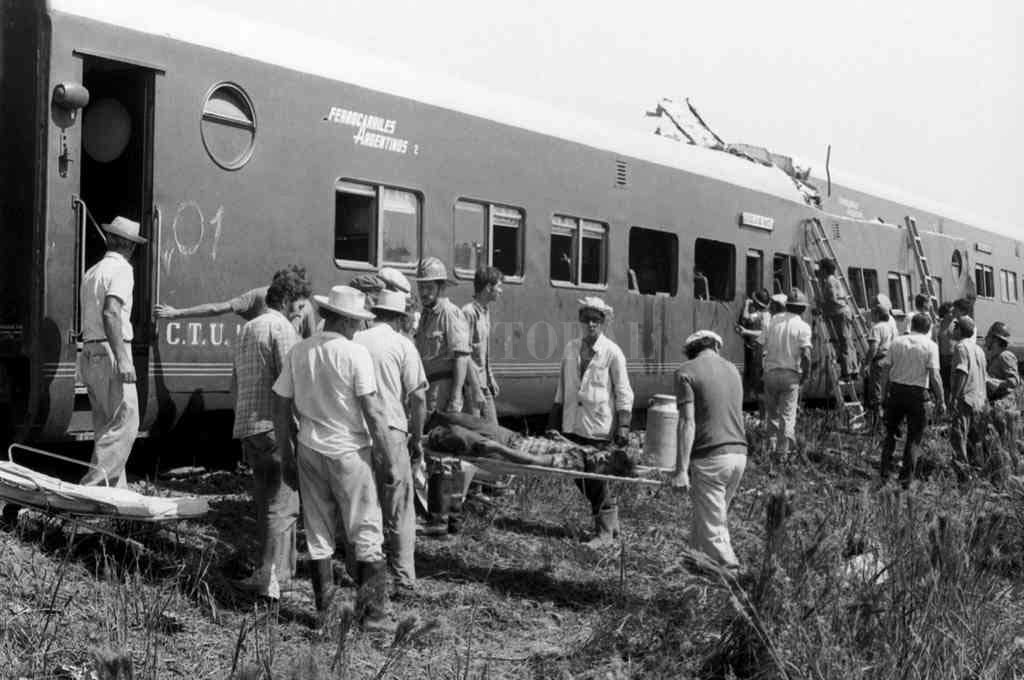
People helping with the rescue of victims

The train, driven by Antonio Gore, could not avoid the crash: the locomotive derailed and collapsed parallel to the tracks, following its route for hundreds of meters until two passenger cars in the center of the train embedded themselves into the ground. As a result, many passengers were struck in the cars. Those who suffered minor injuries could escape by jumping out of the windows, but many others could not be rescued until special machines and tools to cut the coaches open arrived from nearby cities.

Immediately, local residents and several of the passengers of the train began to assist with the rescue process. Police and firefighters arrived from neighbouring towns San Jerónimo, Esperanza, San Francisco, Rafaela, Gálvez, Rosario, Santa Fe, Paraná and others to aid the rescue.

Many bodies could not be identified and were buried in a common grave.
