= Felicia, Argentina =

Town in Santa Fe Province, Argentina

Felicia
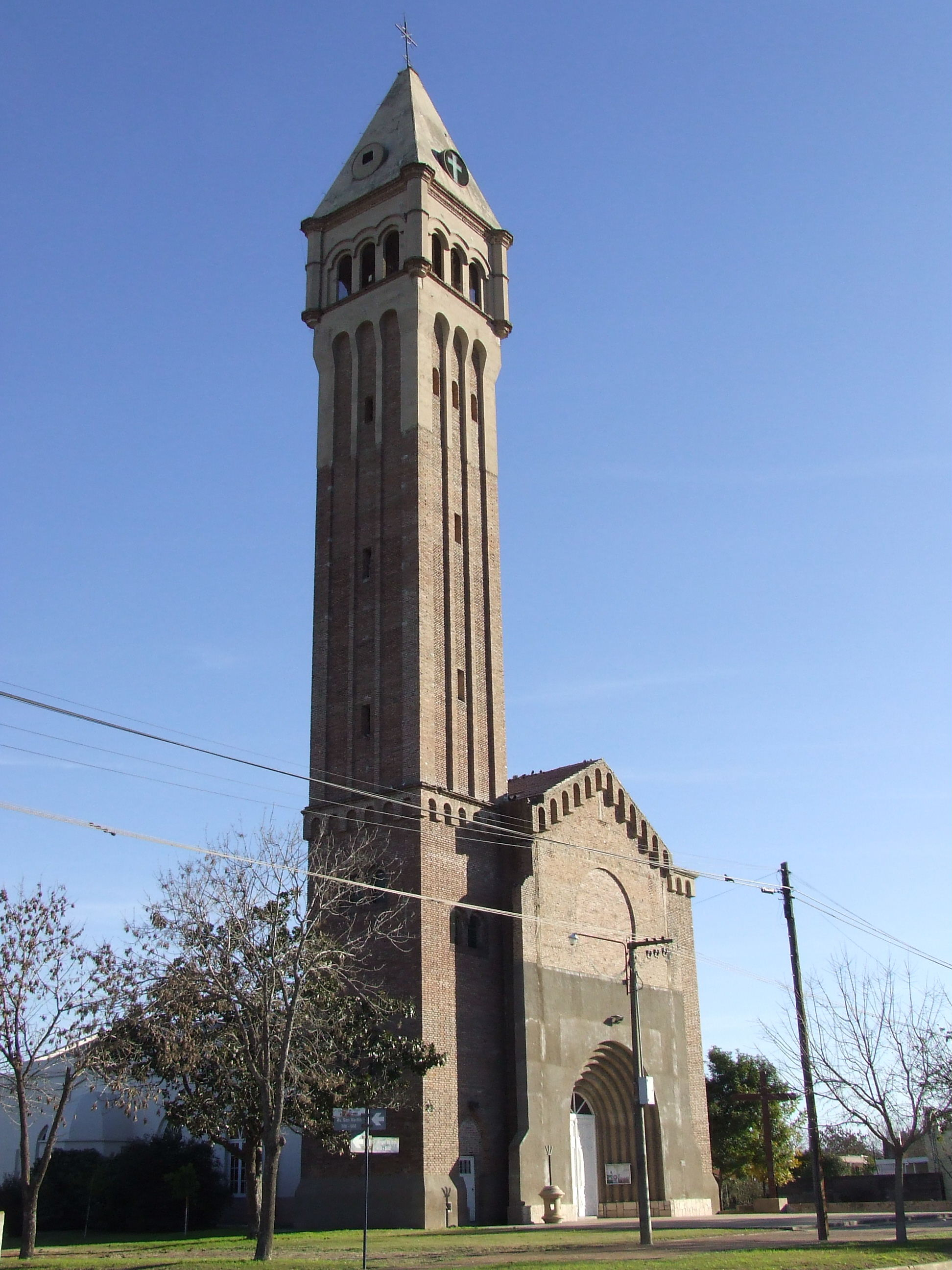
- A Catholic church in Felicia, pictured in 2011

- Location in Argentina
- Coordinates: 31°15′00″S 61°13′00″W
- Country: Argentina
- Province: (Santa Fe Province) Santa Fe
- Department: Las Colonias

Area
  - Total: 249 km^{2} (96 sq mi)
- Elevation: 52 m (171 ft)

Population (2010 census [INDEC])
  - Total: 2,294
- CPA Base: S 3087

Felicia is a town in the Las Colonias Department of Santa Fe Province, Argentina.

== Notable people ==
- Gloria de Bertero (1926–2010), writer, essayist, and biographer
- Alicia Barberis (born 1957), writer, oral narrator, and poet
