= Sa Pereira =

Town in Santa Fe Province, Argentina

- Location in Argentina
- Coordinates: 31°35′00″S 61°23′00″W
- Country: Argentina
- Province: (Santa Fe Province) Santa Fe
- Department: Las Colonias
- Founded: 1886

Government
  - Communal president: Jose Luis Manzoni (PJ)
- Elevation: 54 m (177 ft)

Population (2010 census [INDEC])
  - Total: 1,906
- CPA Base: S 3011
- Area code: 03404

Sa Pereira (alternatively spelled as Sa Pereyra) is a town in the Las Colonias Department of Santa Fe Province, Argentina.

== History ==
Sa Pereira was founded by Guillermo Lehmann in 1886.

In 1978, Sa Pereira was the site of a rail disaster that resulted in fifty-five deaths.
