= Santa María Norte =

Town in Santa Fe Province, Argentina

- Location in Argentina
- Coordinates: 31°30′07.1″S 61°08′13.7″W
- Country: Argentina
- Province: (Santa Fe Province) Santa Fe
- Department: Las Colonias
- Founded: 1869

Government
  - Communal president: Víctor Pablo Amherdt (UCR)
- Elevation: 44 m (144 ft)

Population (2010 census [INDEC])
  - Total: 231
- CPA Base: S3011
- Area code: 03404

Santa María Norte is a town in the Las Colonias Department of Santa Fe Province, Argentina.
