= San Carlos Sud =

Town in Santa Fe Province, Argentina

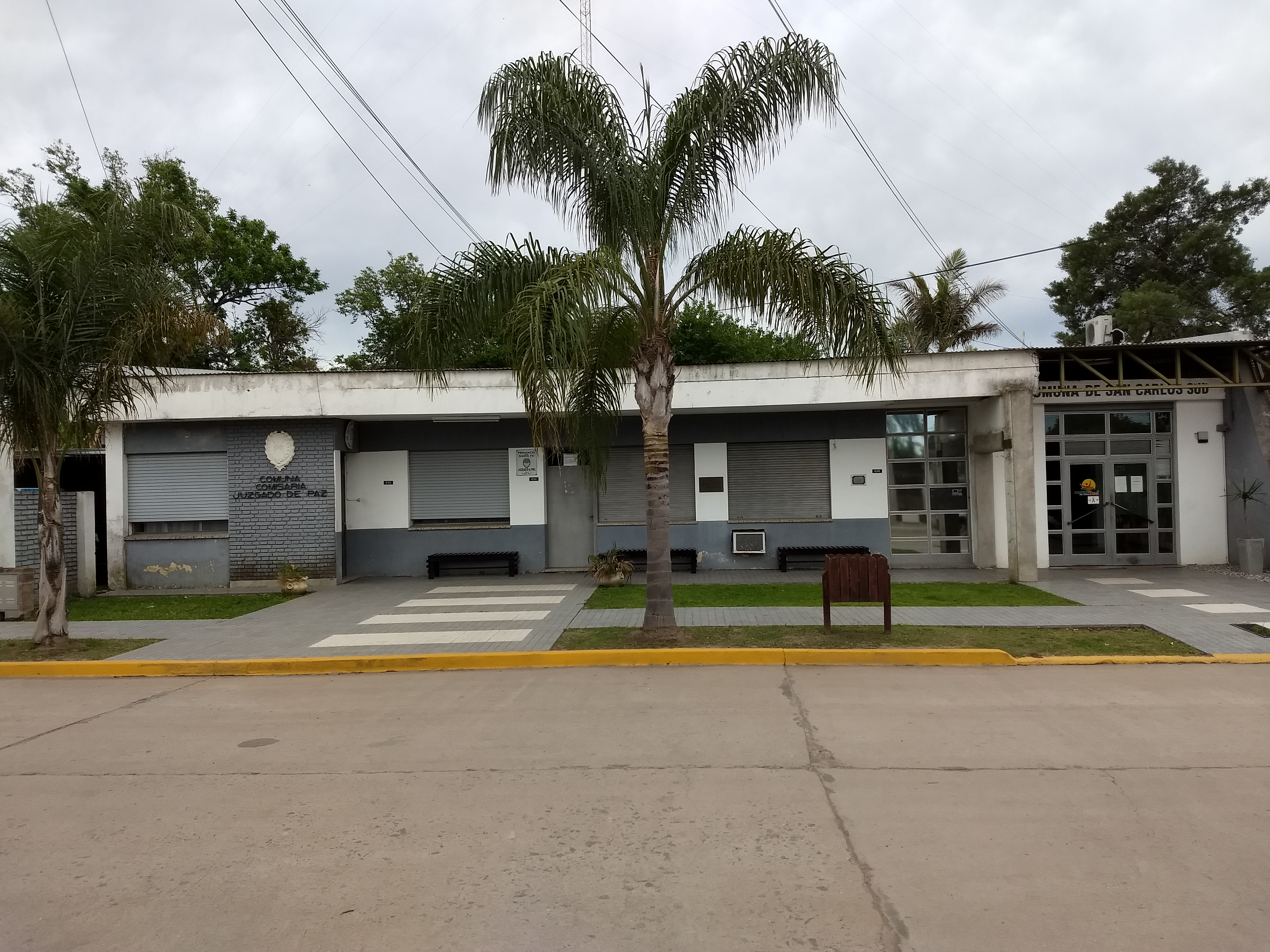

- Location in Argentina
- Coordinates: 31°45′26.1″S 61°06′01.6″W
- Country: Argentina
- Province: (Santa Fe Province) Santa Fe
- Department: Las Colonias
- Founded: 1858

Government
  - Communal president: Florencia Primo
- Elevation: 37 m (121 ft)

Population (2010 census [INDEC])
  - Total: 2,102
- CPA Base: S 3017
- Area code: 03404

San Carlos Sud (also known as San Carlos Sur) is a town in the Las Colonias Department of Santa Fe Province, Argentina.
