= Pujato Norte =

Town in Santa Fe Province, Argentina

- Location in Argentina
- Coordinates: 31°31′10.3″S 60°55′45.1″W
- Country: Argentina
- Province: (Santa Fe Province) Santa Fe
- Department: Las Colonias
- Founded: 1872

Government
  - Communal president: Cristian Pablo Auce (PJ)

Population (2010 census [INDEC])
  - Total: 149
- CPA Base: S 3080
- Area code: 03496

Pujato Norte, also known as Colonia Pujato, is a town in the Las Colonias Department of Santa Fe Province, Argentina.

== History ==
The town was founded in 1872 by José Pujato.
