= Santo Domingo, Santa Fe =

Town in Santa Fe Province, Argentina

Santo Domingo
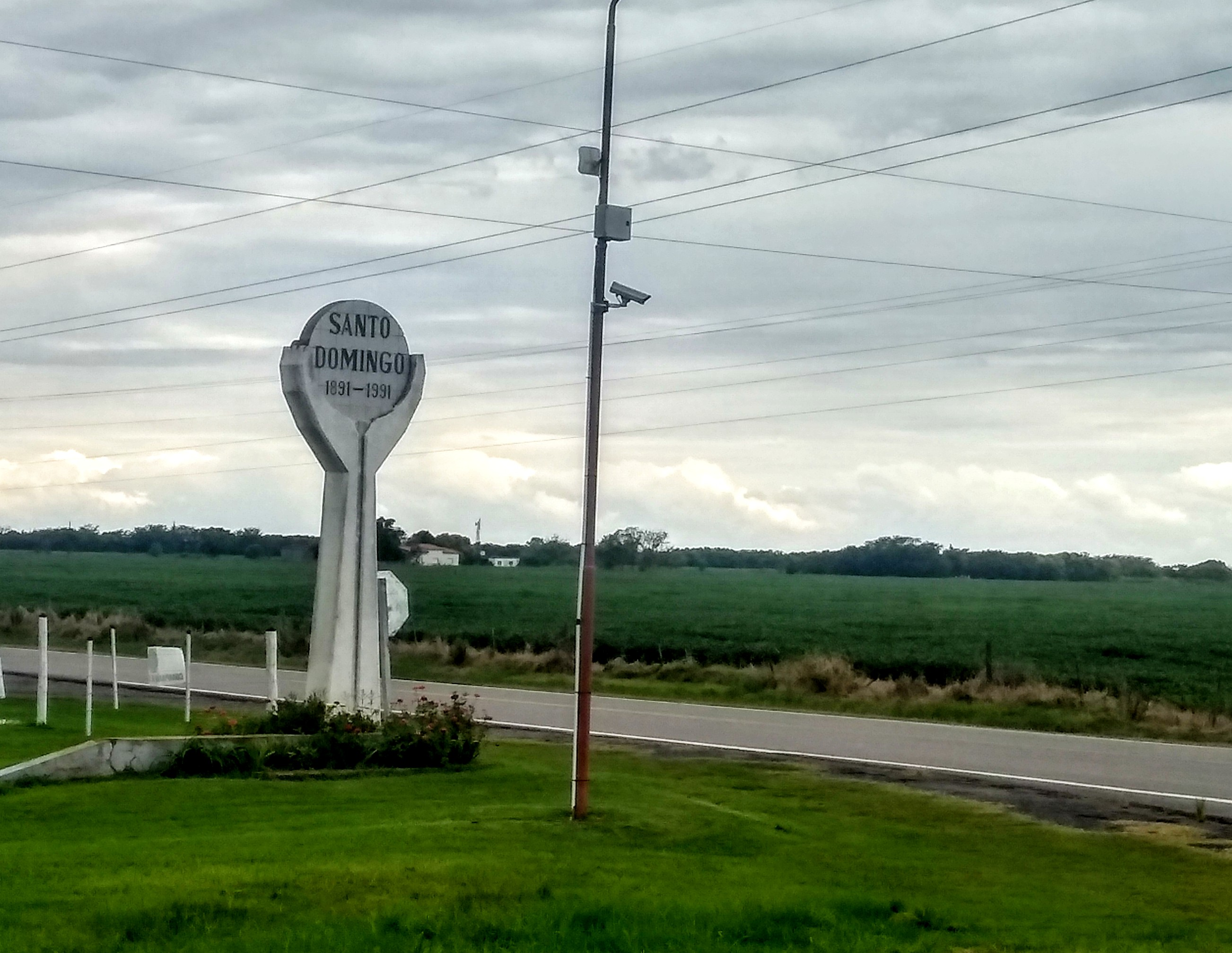

- Location in Argentina
- Coordinates: 31°07′00″S 60°53′00″W
- Country: Argentina
- Province: (Santa Fe Province) Santa Fe
- Department: Las Colonias
- Founded: 14 October 1891

Area
  - Total: 45 km^{2} (17 sq mi)
- Elevation: 45 m (148 ft)

Population (2010 census [INDEC])
  - Total: 1,742
- CPA Base: S3025
- Area code: 03497

Santo Domingo is a town in the Las Colonias Department of Santa Fe Province, Argentina.
