= Las Tunas, Argentina =

Town in Santa Fe Province, Argentina

Las Tunas
- Location in Argentina
- Coordinates: 31°34′16″S 60°59′42″W
- Country: Argentina
- Province: (Santa Fe Province) Santa Fe
- Department: Las Colonias
- Founded: 1868

Government
  - Communal president: Orlando Imhoff (PDP)
- Elevation: 31 m (102 ft)

Population (2010 census [INDEC])
  - Total: 558
- CPA Base: S 3009

Las Tunas is a town in the Las Colonias Department of Santa Fe Province, Argentina. Founded in 1868, it is one of the oldest in the department. It is located 35 kilometers from the provincial capital Santa Fe.
