= Souto Maior =

Souto Maior may refer to:

- Souto Maior (Sabrosa), a civil parish in Sabrosa Municipality, Portugal
- Souto Maior (Trancoso), a civil parish in Trancoso Municipality, Portugal

== See also ==
- Sotomayor
