= Las Colonias Department =

- Department
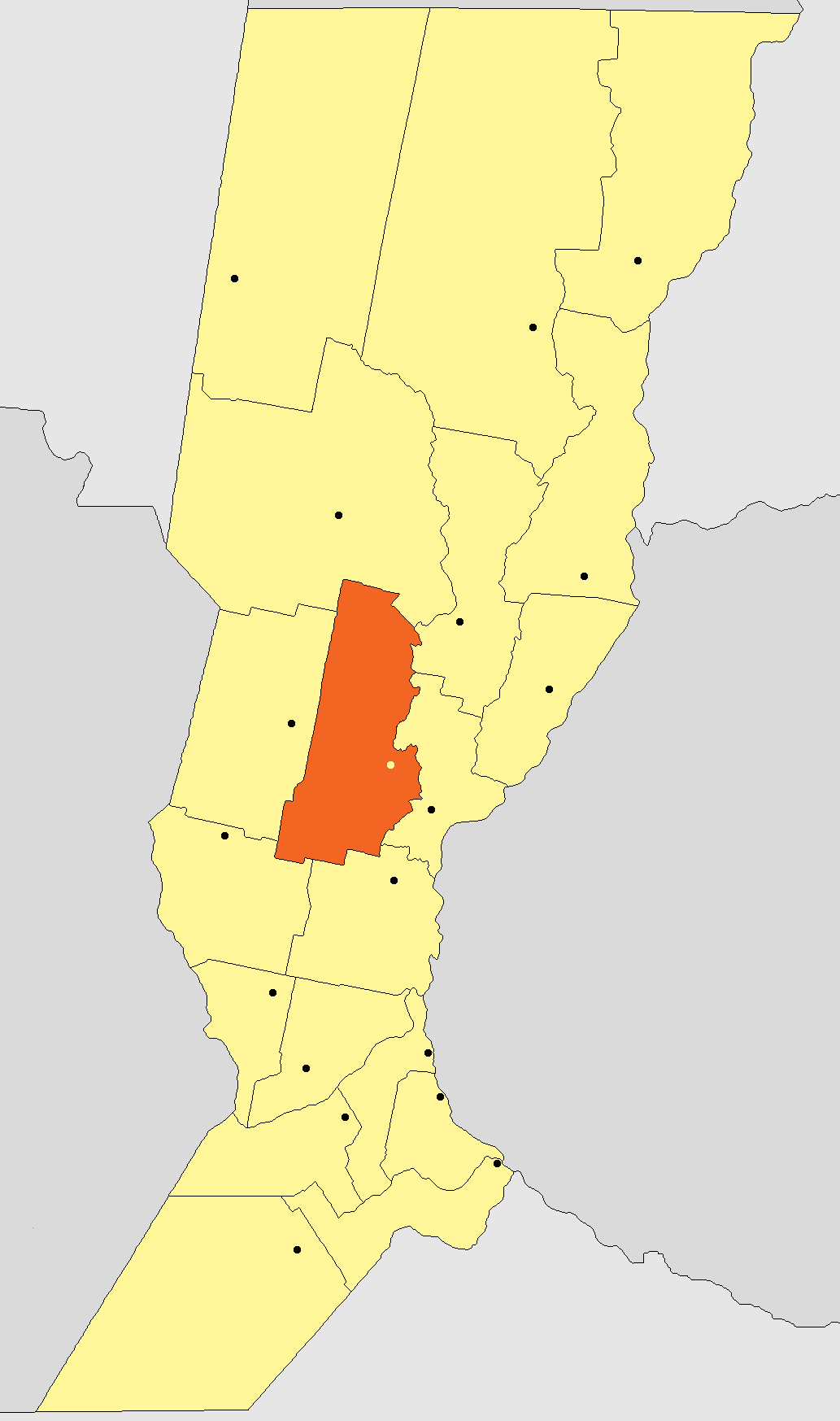
- Location of Las Colonias Department within Santa Fe Province
- Coordinates: 31°25′S 60°56′W
- Country: Argentina
- Province: Santa Fe
- Head town: Esperanza

Area
  - Total: 6,439 km^{2} (2,486 sq mi)

Population
  - Total: 95,202
  - Density: 14.79/km^{2} (38.29/sq mi)
- Time zone: UTC-3 (ART)

The Las Colonias Department (in Spanish, Departamento Las Colonias) is an administrative subdivision (departamento) of the province of Santa Fe, Argentina. It is located in the center of the province. Starting from the east and going clockwise, it limits with the departments of La Capital, San Jerónimo, San Martín, Castellanos, San Cristóbal, and San Justo. Las Colonias is thus one of only three provincial departments that do not share a border with another province.

The department has about 95,000 inhabitants, which are distributed in 37 districts (mostly small municipalities and communes). The head town is Esperanza (population 36,000). Other cities and towns are Colonia Cavour, Colonia San José, Cululú, Elisa, Empalme San Carlos, Felicia, Franck, Grutly, Hipatia, Humboldt, Ituzaingó, Jacinto L. Arauz, La Pelada, Las Tunas, María Luisa, Matilde, Nuevo Torino, Pilar, Progreso, Providencia, Pujato Norte, Rivadavia, Sa Pereira, San Agustín, San Carlos Centro, San Carlos Norte, San Carlos Sud, San Jerónimo del Sauce, San Jerónimo Norte, San Mariano, Santa Clara de Buena Vista, Santa María Centro, Santa María Norte, Santo Domingo, Sarmiento, and Soutomayor.

The name of this department (which means "The Colonies") derives from the fact that it was settled mostly by immigrant families under the system of agricultural colonies, of which Esperanza was the first formally organized in Argentina.
