= Colonia San José, Santa Fe =

Town in Santa Fe Province

Colonia San José
- Location in Argentina
- Coordinates: 31°39′18.3″S 60°51′25.2″W
- Country: Argentina
- Province: (Santa Fe Province) Santa Fe
- Department: Las Colonias
- Founded: 19 March 1871

Government
  - Communal president: Luis Ángel Chatelain (UCR–FPCyS)

Area
  - Total: 54.46 km^{2} (21.03 sq mi)

Population (2010 census [INDEC])
  - Total: 376
- CPA Base: S 3016

Colonia San José is a town in the Las Colonias Department of Santa Fe Province, Argentina.
