= San Carlos Centro =

- City
- Location of San Carlos Centro in Argentina
- Coordinates: 31°44′S 61°6′W
- Country: Argentina
- Province: Santa Fe
- Department: Las Colonias

Government
  - Intendant: Juan José Placenzotti (CLFDLH)

Area
  - Total: 66 km^{2} (25 sq mi)
- Elevation: 40 m (130 ft)

Population (2010)
  - Total: 11,055
  - Density: 170/km^{2} (430/sq mi)
- Time zone: UTC−3 (ART)
- CPA base: S3013
- Dialing code: +54 3404

San Carlos Centro is a city in the center of the province of Santa Fe, Argentina, located 46 kilometres (29 mi) from the provincial capital Santa Fe. It has 11,055 inhabitants as per the 2010 census [INDEC].

Like most other towns in the Las Colonias Department, San Carlos Centro was originally an agricultural colony, populated by European immigrants. It was founded in 1858 by Carlos Beck Bernard, of the Beck & Herzog Swiss Colonizing Society. The settlement received the category of comuna (village or commune) on 2 June 1886, and became a city (full-fledged municipality) on 9 October 1986. The city preserves its historical past at the Historical Museum of the San Carlos Colony.
