= Cululú =

- Village
- Location within Argentina Location within South America
- Coordinates: 31°12′00″S 60°56′00″W
- Country: Argentina
- Province: Santa Fe
- Department: Las Colonias
- Established: 1866
- Elevation: 38 m (125 ft)

Population (2010 Census)
  - Total: 368
- Time zone: ART
- CPA Base: S 3023
- Area code: +54 3497
- Climate: Cfa

Cululú is a village in Argentina, located in the Las Colonias Department of Santa Fe Province.

== People ==
Its most notable resident was Emiliano Sala, a professional footballer who played for Bordeaux and Nantes, and who died due to a plane crash in January 2019.
