= Sarmiento, Santa Fe =

Town in Santa Fe Province, Argentina

Sarmiento
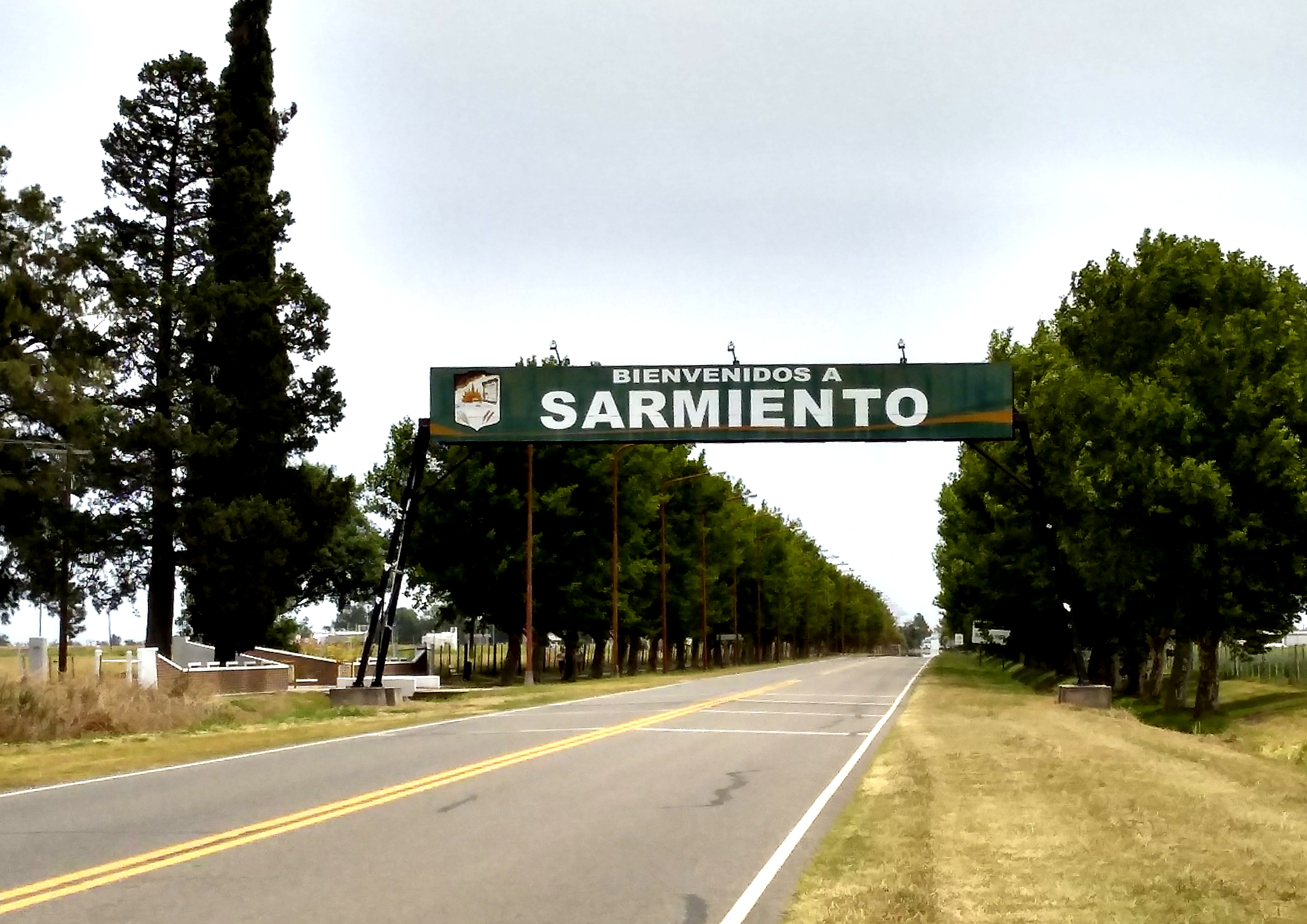

- Location in Argentina
- Coordinates: 31°04′00″S 61°10′00″W
- Country: Argentina
- Province: (Santa Fe Province) Santa Fe
- Department: Las Colonias
- Founded: 1881

Government
  - Communal president: Adolfo Cherry
- Elevation: 57 m (187 ft)

Population (2010 census [INDEC])
  - Total: 1,640
- CPA Base: S3024
- Area code: 03497

Sarmiento is a town in the Las Colonias Department of Santa Fe Province, Argentina.
