= San Jerónimo del Sauce =

Town in Santa Fe Province, Argentina

- Location in Argentina
- Coordinates: 31°36′39.1″S 61°08′32.5″W
- Country: Argentina
- Province: (Santa Fe Province) Santa Fe
- Department: Las Colonias
- Founded: 1825

Government
  - Communal president: Daniel Rios

Area
  - Total: 180 km^{2} (69 sq mi)

Population (2010 census [INDEC])
  - Total: 947
- CPA Base: S 3009
- Area code: 03404

San Jerónimo del Sauce is a town in the Las Colonias Department of Santa Fe Province, Argentina.
