= La Pelada =

Town in Santa Fe Province, Argentina

- Location in Argentina
- Coordinates: 30°51′57″S 60°58′04″W
- Country: Argentina
- Province: (Santa Fe Province) Santa Fe
- Department: Las Colonias
- Founded: 1892

Government
  - Communal president: Cesar Mathey (PJ)
- Elevation: 51 m (167 ft)

Population (2010 census [INDEC])
  - Total: 1,377
- CPA Base: S 3027

La Pelada is a town in the Las Colonias Department of Santa Fe Province, Argentina.

== History ==
La Pelada was founded by Juan Bernardo Iturraspe in 1892. A fort used to be located in the town to defend against the Malón offensives of the Mapuche.
