= Elisa, Argentina =

Town in Santa Fe Province, Argentina

Elisa
- Location in Argentina
- Coordinates: 30°41′00″S 61°03′00″W
- Country: Argentina
- Province: (Santa Fe Province) Santa Fe
- Department: Las Colonias
- Founded: 1891

Government
  - Communal president: Abel Saluzzo (PDP)

Area
  - Total: 256 km^{2} (99 sq mi)
- Elevation: 50 m (160 ft)

Population (2010 census [INDEC])
  - Total: 1,721
- CPA Base: S 3029

Elisa is a town in the Las Colonias Department of Santa Fe Province, Argentina.
