= Via Cavour =

Via Cavour may refer to several streets in Italy:

- Via Cavour, Florence
- Via Cavour, Palermo
- Via Cavour, Rome
- Via Cavour, Turin, see University of Turin

== See also ==
- Cavour (disambiguation)
