= Rivadavia, Santa Fe =

Town in Santa Fe Province, Argentina

Rivadavia
- Location in Argentina
- Coordinates: 31°19′27″S 61°03′04″W
- Country: Argentina
- Province: (Santa Fe Province) Santa Fe
- Department: Las Colonias
- Founded: 1876

Government
  - Communal president: Néstor Abel Reidel
- Elevation: 33 m (108 ft)

Population (2010 census [INDEC])
  - Total: 272
- CPA Base: S 3081
- Area code: 03496

Rivadavia is a town in the Las Colonias Department of Santa Fe Province, Argentina.
