= Jacinto L. Arauz =

Town in Santa Fe Province, Argentina

- Location in Argentina
- Coordinates: 30°43′09″S 60°58′30″W
- Country: Argentina
- Province: (Santa Fe Province) Santa Fe
- Department: Las Colonias

Government
  - Communal president: Leandro Flores (UCR–FPCyS)

Population (2010 census [INDEC])
  - Total: 212
- CPA Base: S 3029

Jacinto L. Arauz is a town in the Las Colonias Department of Santa Fe Province, Argentina.
