= San Carlos Norte =

Town in Santa Fe Province, Argentina

- Location in Argentina
- Coordinates: 31°40′24.6″S 61°04′29.3″W
- Country: Argentina
- Province: (Santa Fe Province) Santa Fe
- Department: Las Colonias
- Founded: 1858

Government
  - Communal president: Víctor Lionel Cavallero
- Elevation: 46 m (151 ft)

Population (2010 census [INDEC])
  - Total: 1,061
- CPA Base: S 3010
- Area code: 03404

San Carlos Norte is a town in the Las Colonias Department of Santa Fe Province, Argentina.
