= Franck, Argentina =

Town in Santa Fe Province, Argentina

Franck
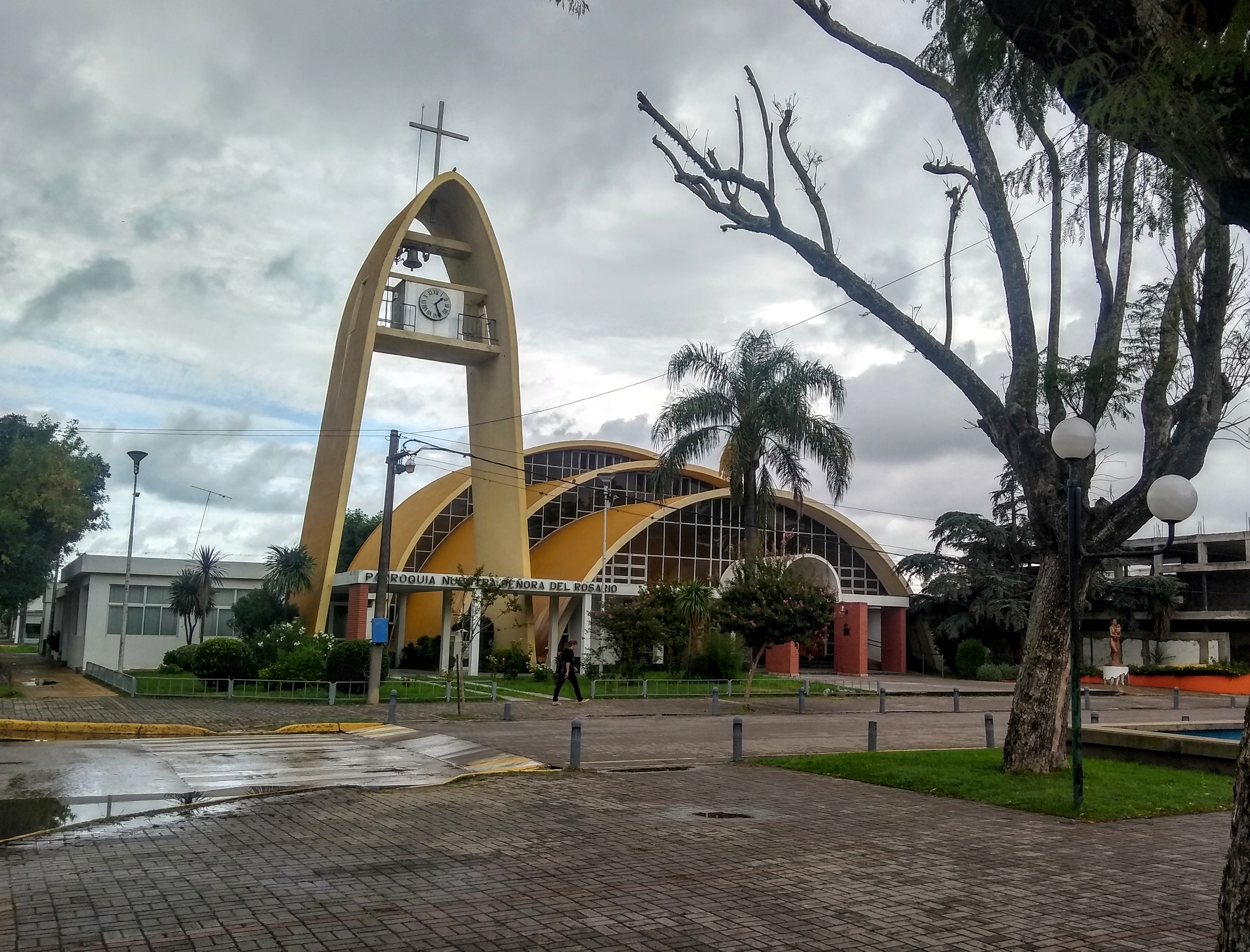
- Parroquia Nuestra Señora del Rosario, a church in Franck, pictured in 2019

- Location in Argentina
- Coordinates: 31°35′11″S 60°56′11″W
- Country: Argentina
- Province: (Santa Fe Province) Santa Fe
- Department: Las Colonias
- Founded: 1870

Government
  - Communal president: Javier Luis Enrico (PRO–JxC)

Area
  - Total: 63 km^{2} (24 sq mi)
- Elevation: 31 m (102 ft)

Population (2010 census [INDEC])
  - Total: 5,505
- CPA Base: S 3009

Franck is a town in the Las Colonias Department of Santa Fe Province, Argentina. It is located 25 kilometers from the provincial capital Santa Fe.

== History ==
The town was founded in 1870 by Mauricio Franck, a German colonizer who founded several towns in Santa Fe Province after having been in California during the Gold Rush.
