= Providencia, Argentina =

Town in Santa Fe Province, Argentina

Providencia
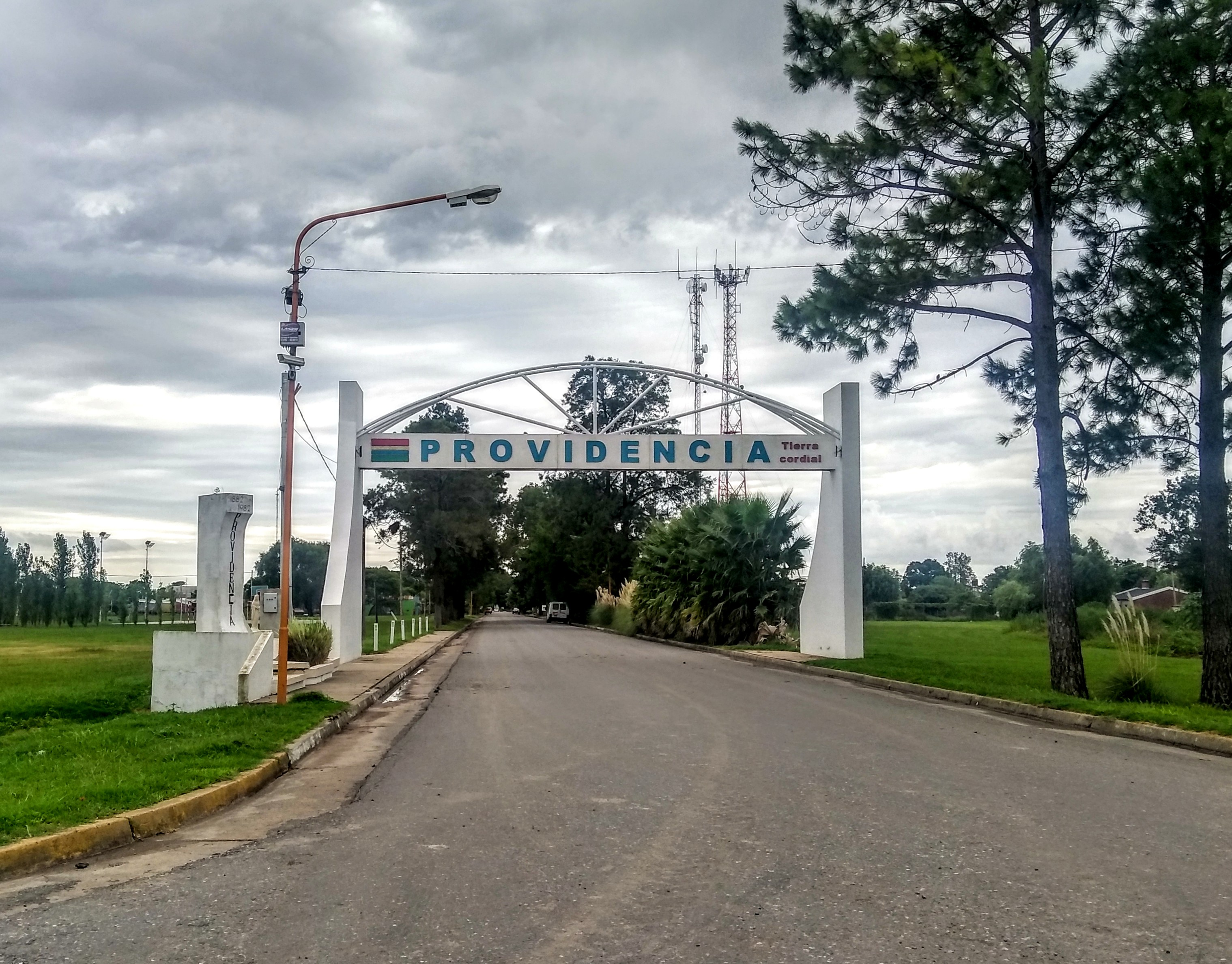
- Providencia in February 2019

- Location in Argentina
- Coordinates: 30°58′58.1″S 61°01′16.2″W
- Country: Argentina
- Province: (Santa Fe Province) Santa Fe
- Department: Las Colonias

Area
  - Total: 201 km^{2} (78 sq mi)
- Elevation: 46 m (151 ft)

Population (2010 census [INDEC])
  - Total: 899
- CPA Base: S 3025
- Area code: 03497

Providencia is a town in the Las Colonias Department of Santa Fe Province, Argentina.
