= Santa Clara de Buena Vista =

Town in Santa Fe Province, Argentina

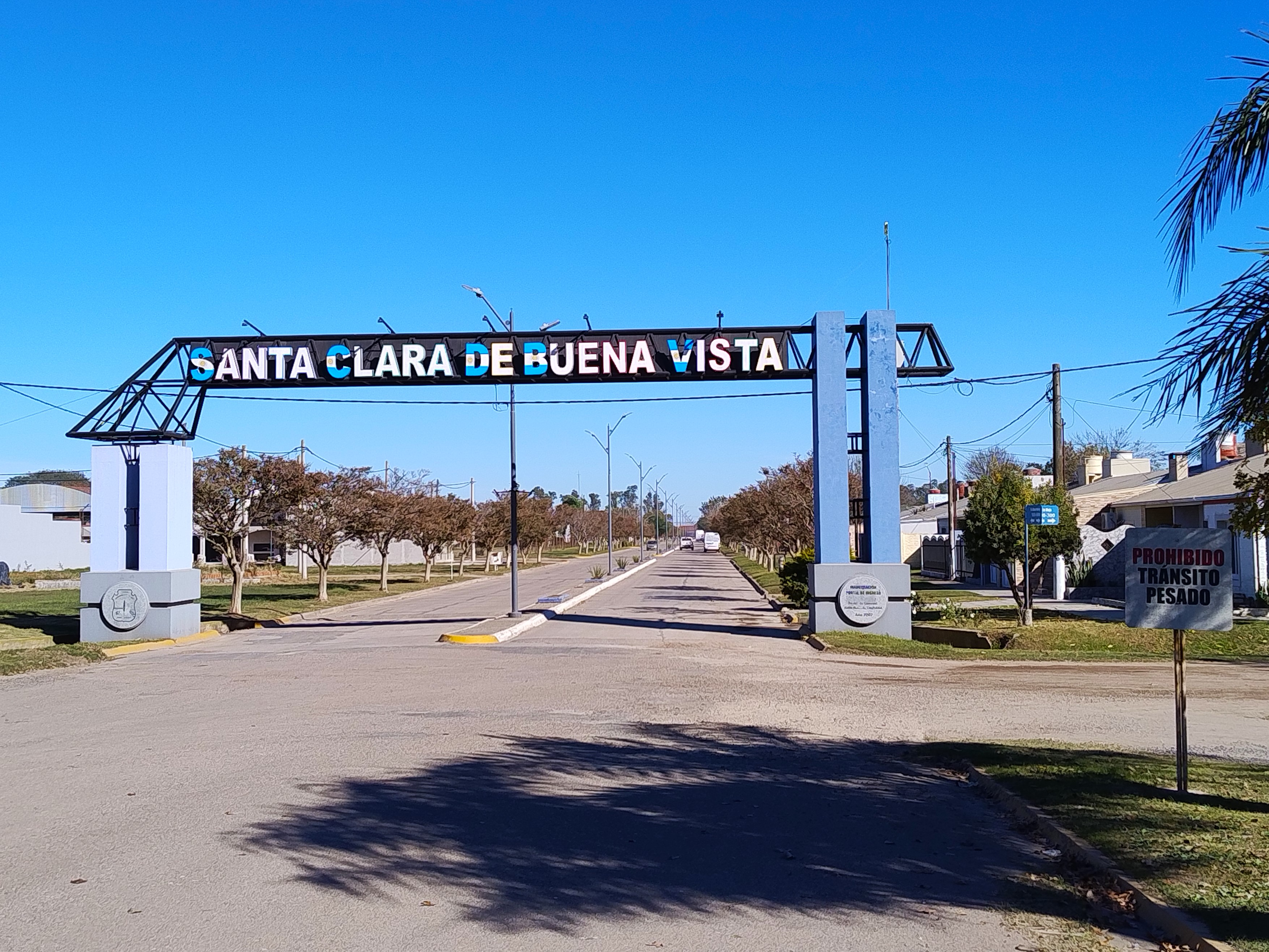

- Location in Argentina
- Coordinates: 31°45′44.5″S 61°18′56.8″W
- Country: Argentina
- Province: (Santa Fe Province) Santa Fe
- Department: Las Colonias
- Founded: 1886

Government
  - Communal president: Juan Manuel Caudana

Area
  - Total: 437 km^{2} (169 sq mi)
- Elevation: 40 m (130 ft)

Population (2010 census [INDEC])
  - Total: 3,104
- CPA Base: S2258
- Area code: 03404

Santa Clara de Buena Vista is a town in the Las Colonias Department of Santa Fe Province, Argentina.
