= Nuevo Torino =

Town in Santa Fe Province, Argentina

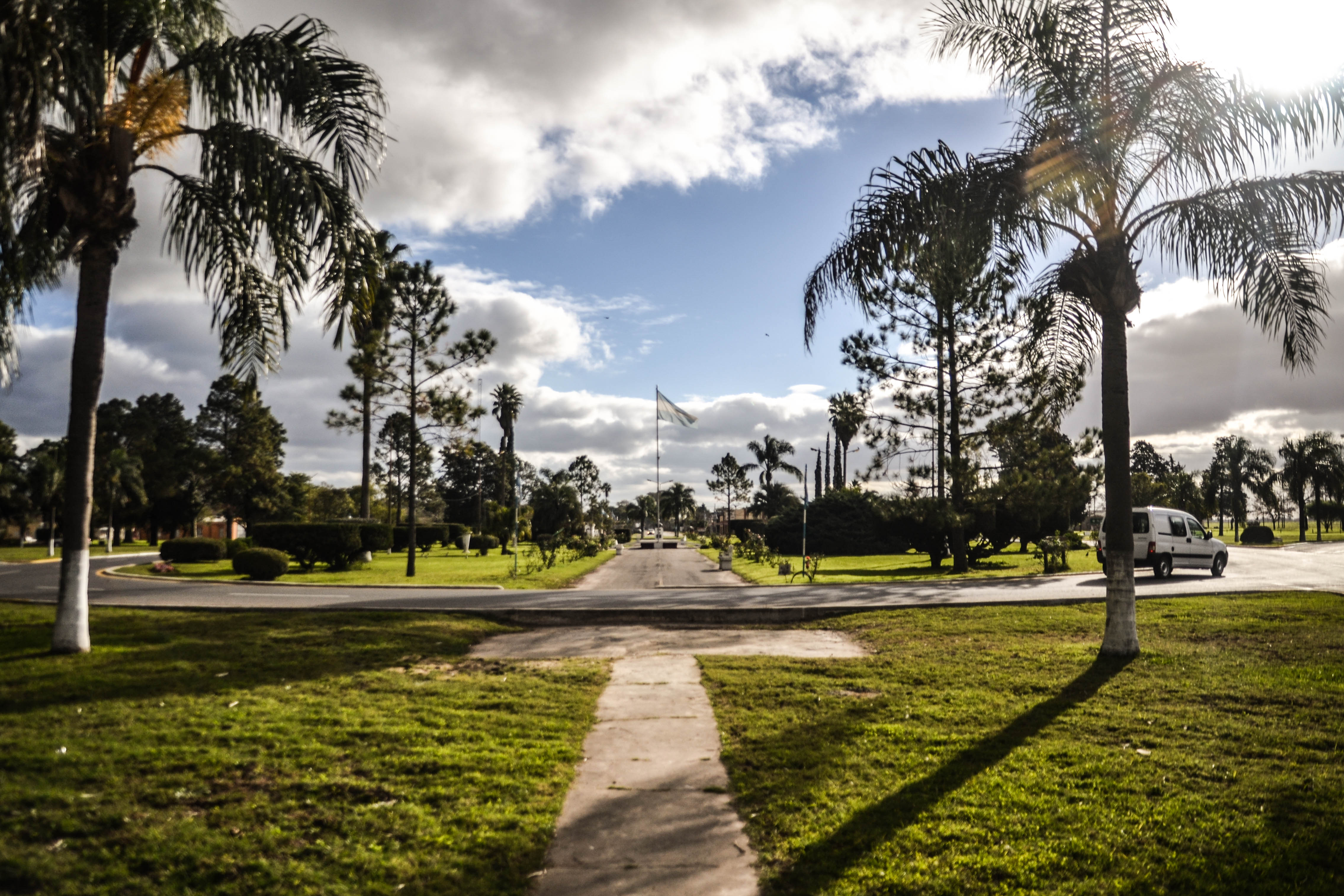
- Plaza San Martín in Nuevo Torino, pictured in 2017

- Location in Argentina
- Coordinates: 31°20′42″S 61°14′06″W
- Country: Argentina
- Province: (Santa Fe Province) Santa Fe
- Department: Las Colonias

Government
  - Communal president: Juan Carlos Imsteyf (PJ)

Population (2010 census [INDEC])
  - Total: 818
- CPA Base: S 3087
- Area code: 03496

Nuevo Torino is a town in the Las Colonias Department of Santa Fe Province, Argentina.

== History ==
The town was founded by Guillermo Lehmann and Christian Clauss in 1875, then it was populated by Piedmontese and Swiss settlers.
In 1886, a cholera epidemic killed almost all the inhabitants.
Until this moment, the town lived for subsistence economy, after the settlement of new inhabitants, Nuevo Torino started milk and cheese production, that continues nowadays.
