= Soutomayor =

Town in Santa Fe Province, Argentina

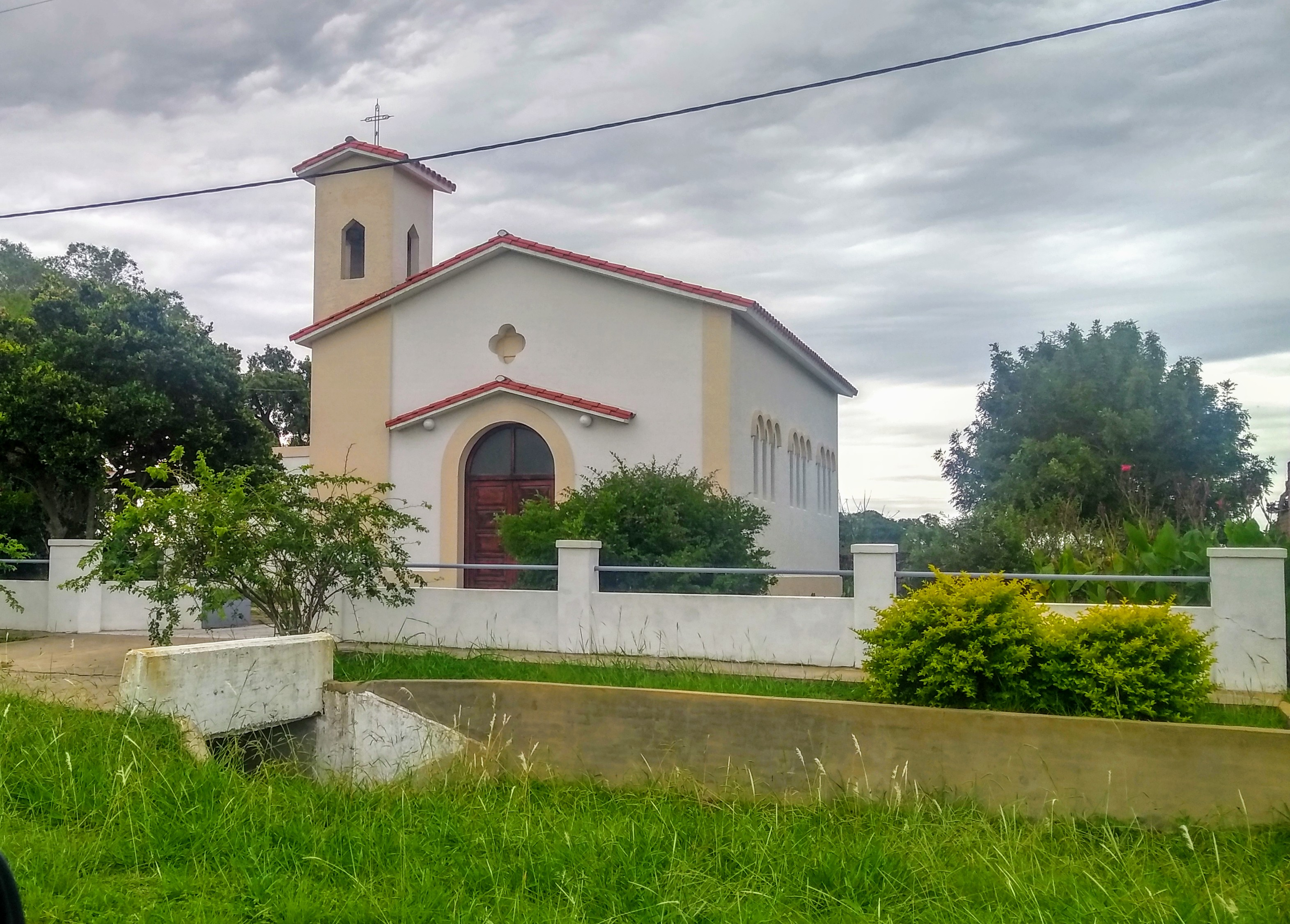
- A chapel in Soutomayor, pictured in 2019

- Location in Argentina
- Coordinates: 30°56′10″S 61°9′56″W
- Country: Argentina
- Province: (Santa Fe Province) Santa Fe
- Department: Las Colonias
- Founded: 1885 (as Colonia San Miguel); 1912 (as Soutomayor)

Government
  - Communal president: Hugo Bernardino Salera (UCR)

Population (2010 census [INDEC])
  - Total: 204
- CPA Base: S 3025

Soutomayor is a town in the Las Colonias Department of Santa Fe Province, Argentina.
