= Ituzaingó, Santa Fe =

Town in Santa Fe Province, Argentina

Ituzaingó
- Location in Argentina
- Coordinates: 30°46′51″S 61°10′30″W
- Country: Argentina
- Province: (Santa Fe Province) Santa Fe
- Department: Las Colonias

Government
  - Communal president: Clemar Alassia (FPCyS)
- Elevation: 51 m (167 ft)

Population (2010 census [INDEC])
  - Total: 81
- CPA Base: S 2311

Ituzaingó is a town in the Las Colonias Department of Santa Fe Province, Argentina.
