= San Mariano, Argentina =

Town in Santa Fe Province, Argentina

- Location in Argentina
- Coordinates: 31°40′06.3″S 61°20′50.9″W
- Country: Argentina
- Province: (Santa Fe Province) Santa Fe
- Department: Las Colonias
- Founded: 29 July 1907

Government
  - Communal president: Hugo Amicucci (UCR)
- Elevation: 44 m (144 ft)

Population (2010 census [INDEC])
  - Total: 403
- CPA Base: S 3011
- Area code: 03404

San Mariano is a town in the Las Colonias Department of Santa Fe Province, Argentina.
