= Humboldt, Argentina =

Town in Santa Fe Province, Argentina

Humboldt
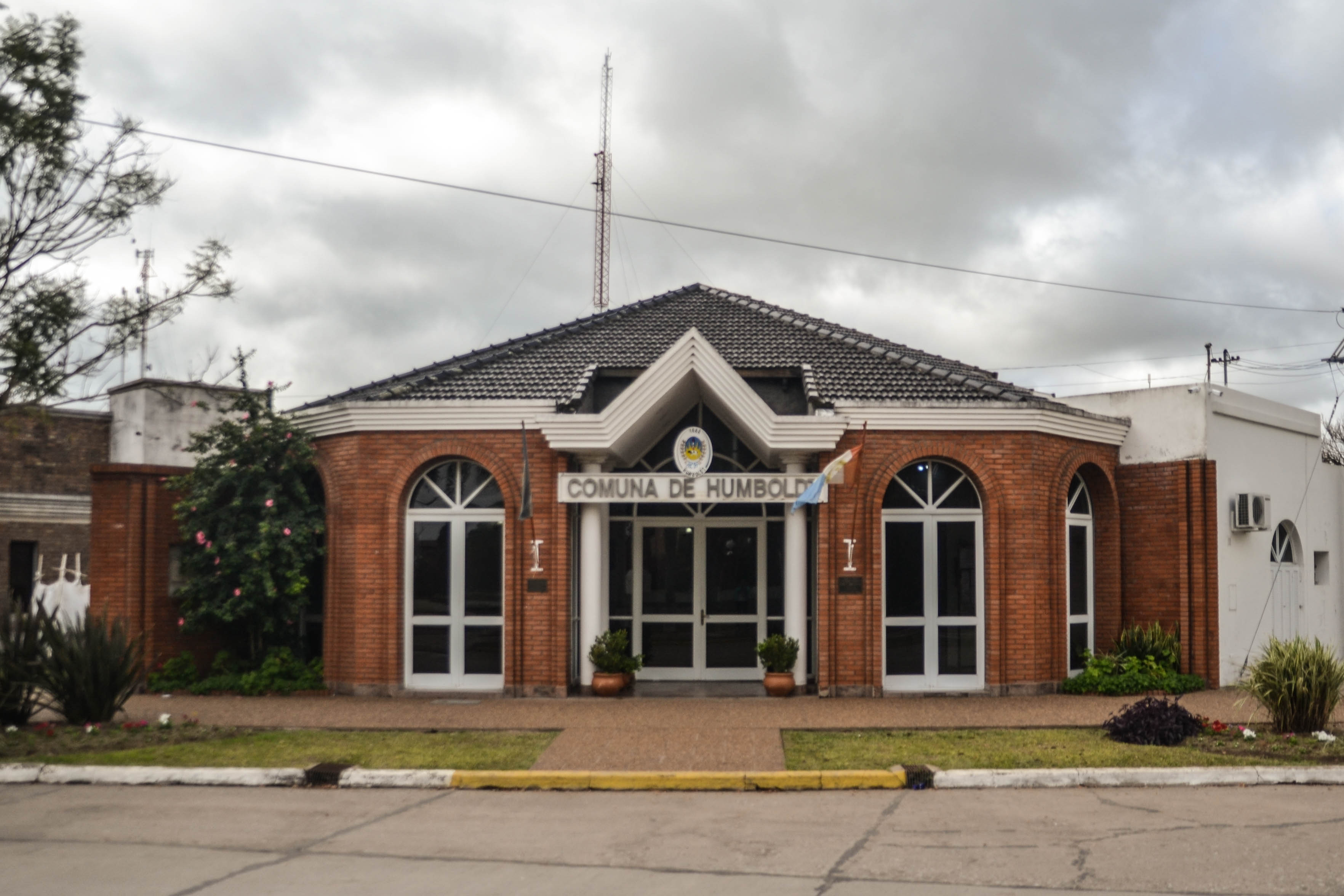
- Humboldt's town hall, pictured in 2017

- Location in Argentina Humboldt (Santa Fe Province)
- Coordinates: 31°22.00′S 61°03.00′W
- Country: Argentina
- Province: Santa Fe
- Department: Las Colonias
- Founded: 1868 (158 years ago)
- Founder: Beck and Herzog

Area
  - Total: 240 km^{2} (93 sq mi)
- Elevation: 50 m (160 ft)

Population (2022 census)
  - Total: 5,321
- Time zone: UTC−3 (ART)
- CPA Base: S3081

Humboldt is a town in the Las Colonias Department of Santa Fe Province, Argentina. It has 5,321 inhabitants according to the 2022 census [INDEC].
