= Progreso, Argentina =

Town in Santa Fe Province, Argentina

Progreso
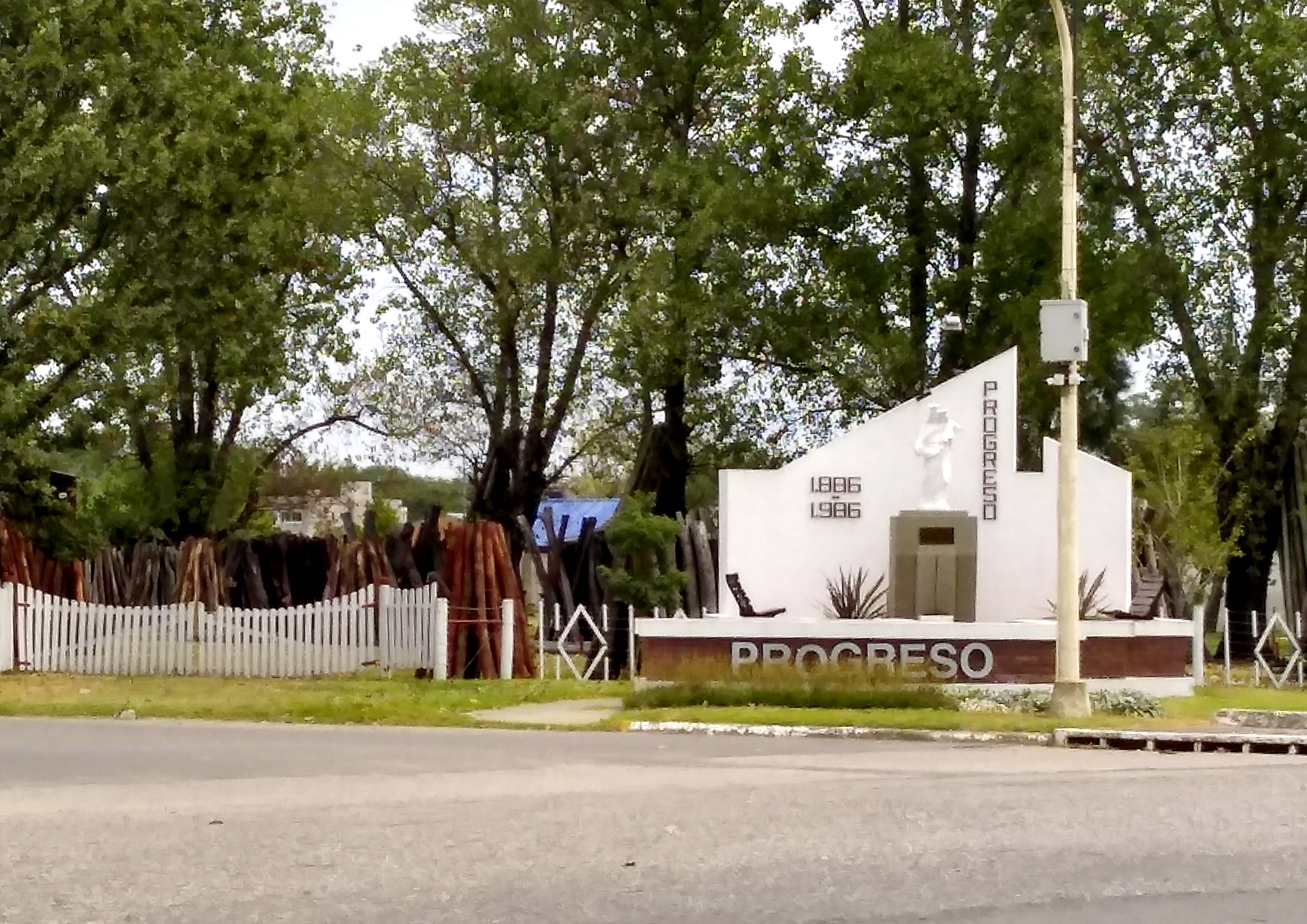
- Memorial al Centenario in Progreso, pictured in 2018

- Location in Argentina
- Coordinates: 31°08′S 60°59′W
- Country: Argentina
- Province: (Santa Fe Province) Santa Fe
- Department: Las Colonias
- Founded: 1881

Government
  - Communal president: Verá Giovani (UCR–FPCyS)

Area
  - Total: 131 km^{2} (51 sq mi)
- Elevation: 37 m (121 ft)

Population
  - Estimate (2021): 3,000

Progreso is a town in the Las Colonias Department of Santa Fe Province, Argentina. It is located in the center of the province, 75 kilometers northwest of the provincial capital Santa Fe.

== Notable people ==
- Emiliano Sala, footballer
