= Colonia Cavour =

Town in Santa Fe Province, Argentina

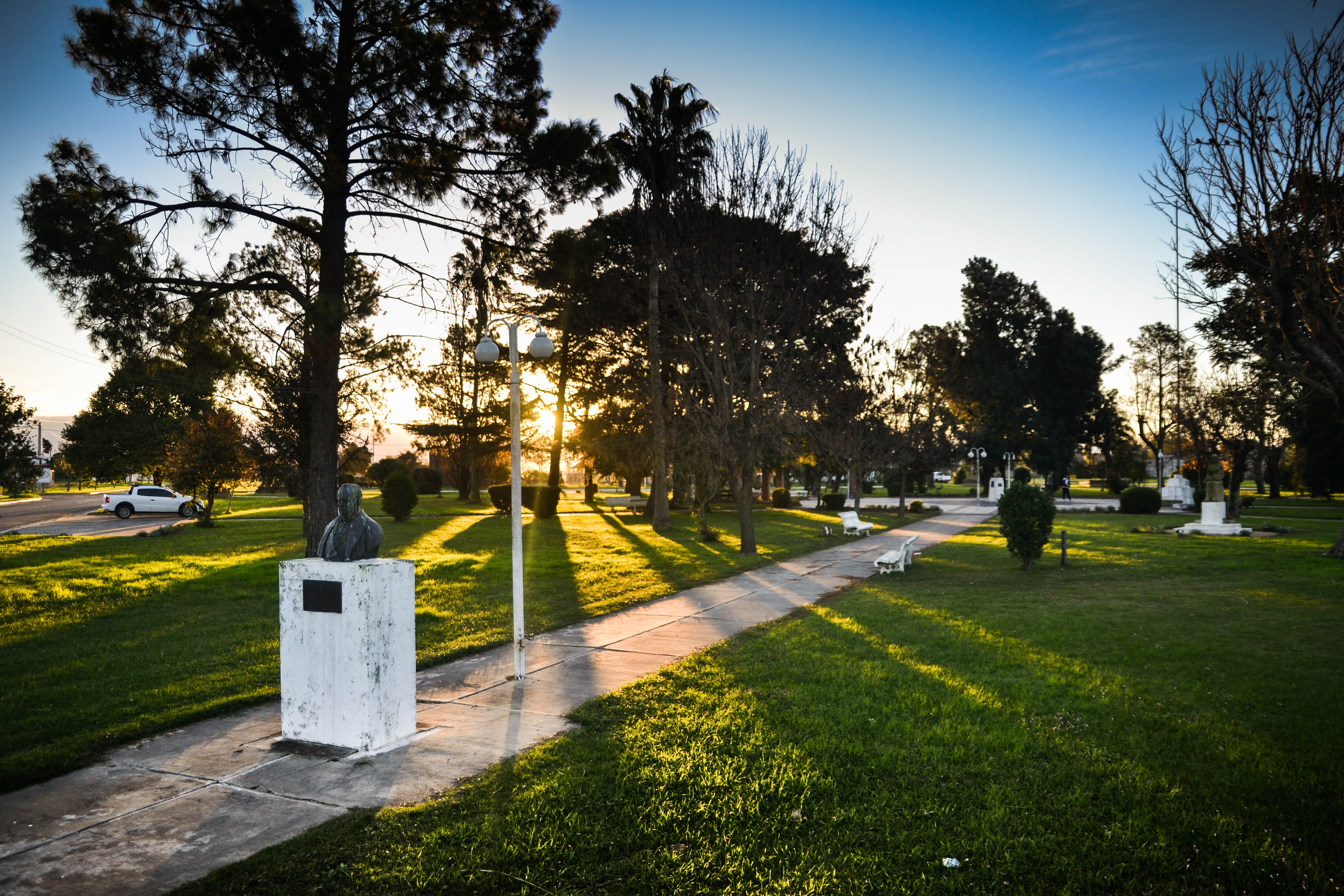
- Main square in Colonia Cavour, pictured in 2017

- Location in Argentina
- Coordinates: 31°21′50″S 61°00′58″W
- Country: Argentina
- Province: (Santa Fe Province) Santa Fe
- Department: Las Colonias
- Founded: 1869

Government
  - Communal president: Marcela Pérez (PRO–JxC)

Population (2010 census [INDEC])
  - Total: 329
- CPA Base: S 3081

Colonia Cavour, also known simply as Cavour, is a town in the Las Colonias Department of Santa Fe Province, Argentina.

== History ==
The town was founded in 1869 by Giuseppe Lambruschini.
