= San Mariano, Corciano =

San Mariano
- Frazione
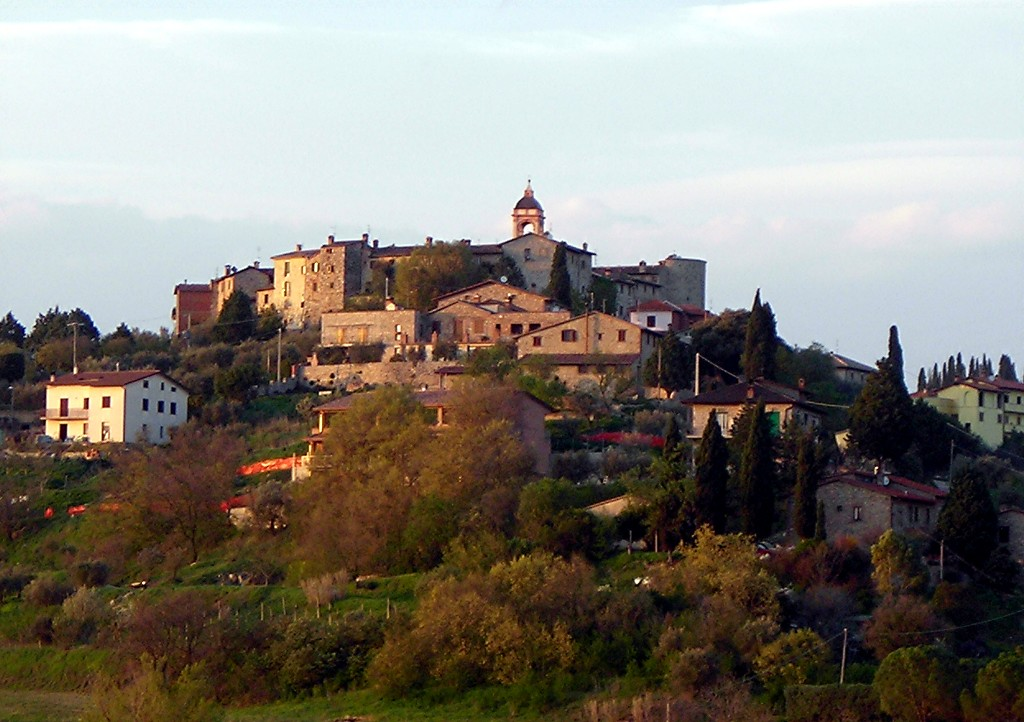

- Location of San Mariano in Italy
- Coordinates: 43°05′07″N 12°18′15″E
- Country: Italy
- Region: Umbria
- Province: Perugia
- Comune: Corciano
- Elevation: 315 m (1,033 ft)

Population (2001)
  - Total: 1,152
- Time zone: UTC+1 (CET)
  - Summer (DST): UTC+2 (CEST)
- Dialing code: 075

San Mariano is a village of the municipality of Corciano in the Province of Perugia, Umbria, central Italy. It stands at an elevation of 315 metres above sea level and was named for San Mariano. The village lies over three hills: the first with a castle, the second with a cemetery and the third near the place called "La Badia." From the top of the hills can be seen San Sisto and Lacugnana Hill eastwards, the plane of Castel del Piano to the south, Solomeo towards the west and the villages of Ellera and Olmo northwards. Notable monuments are the old castle (which, in July 1365 after a battle near the plane of Bagnaia, gave refuge to English troops), the medieval church and the monument dedicated to the soldiers of the 1st world war. Just next to the parish church is the Rachel Marro public gardens fitted with benches in the middle of some thriving olive trees. In a corner of the gardens there is a memorial stone with the carved names of those who gave their lives during the two world wars. At the time of the Istat census of 2001 it had 1152 inhabitants. San Mariano is connected by bus routes with the city of Perugia. During recent years it has developed many commercial activities such as malls and cinemas built in the plane near the village.
