= Norton (surname) =

- Language: English

Origin
- Meaning: North Town

Other names
- Variant forms: Nortown, Nortone, Nortun, Naughton, Naughten, O'Naughton, O'Naughten, Neachtain (Gaeilge)

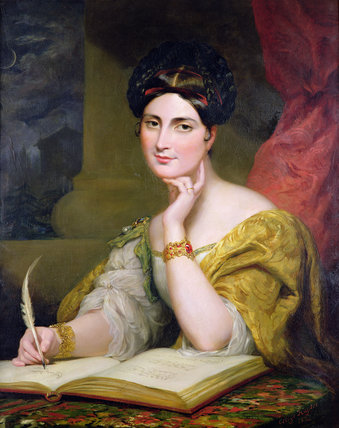
Caroline Norton

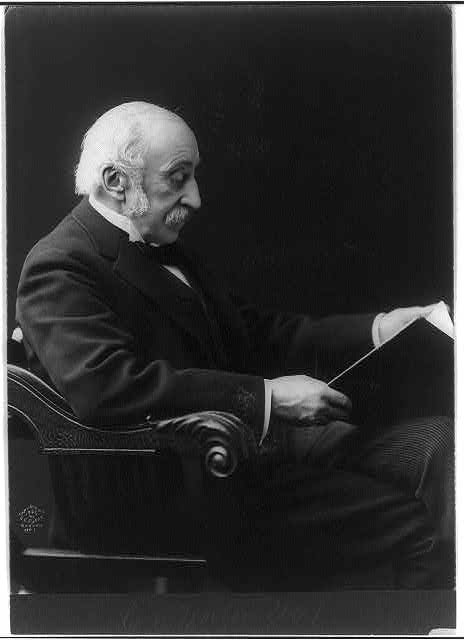
Charles Eliot Norton

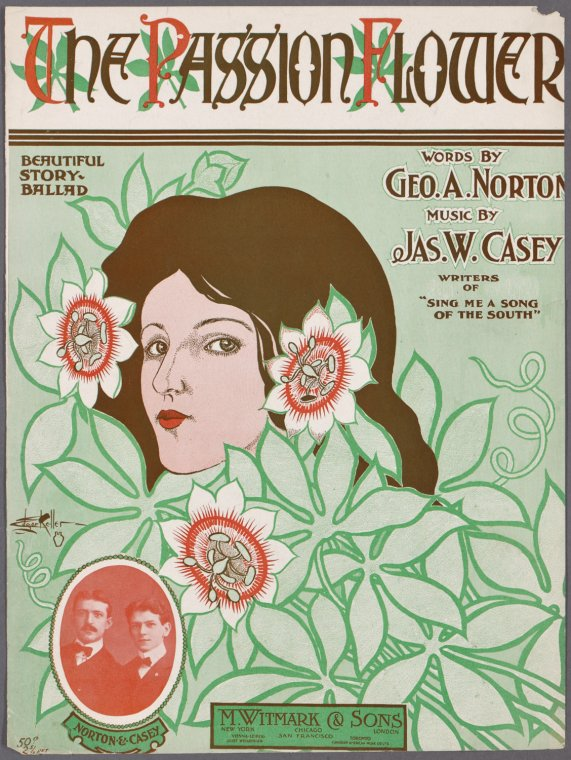
George A. Norton (shown bottom left)

Norton is a surname with origin from the Old English norþ + tun, meaning North settlement (cf., Weston, Sutton, and Easton for other surnames derived from points of the compass). There are many English villages called Norton or including Norton as part of the name, e.g. Midsomer Norton, Chipping Norton, Brize Norton etc. When surnames started to be used in England during the Middle Ages, a man from such a village might have had the name added e.g. Tom of Norton. Alternatively, a man from the north side of any village might be given the name Tom Norton to distinguish him from a Tom from the south side (Tom Sutton). A secondary source for the surname is from the anglicisation of Celtic (Irish and Scottish Gaelic) surnames (e.g. Naughtan). *It is also sometimes found as a Jewish surname (probably from the anglicisation of the German surname Norden). The famous Emperor Norton in San Francisco was of Jewish origin from a South African settler family.* The Jewish and German are only supposed because of Emperor Norton. As a people with the name, they moved around. Norton was found in many places even in Spain, but originated from Pictish tribes in what is now Scotland, which was once Celtic land.

== Distribution ==
As a surname, Norton is the 660th most common surname in Great Britain, with 14,856 bearers. It is most common in Lancashire, where it is the 389th most common surname, with 1,837 bearers. Other concentrations include North Lanarkshire, (28th, 1,773), Hereford and Worcester, (50th, 1,733), Gloucestershire, (145th, 1,827), Devon (159th, 1,791), West Yorkshire, (235th, 1,755), Cheshire, (235th, 1,731), and Essex, (377th, 1,719).

In Ireland, the surname could be of both Irish and English origin. The Nortons of Athlone are descended from Feradach Ó Neachtain who died in 1790.

== People ==
- Andre Norton (1912–2005), American science-fiction author
- Andrew Norton (born 1965), Australian writer
- Andrews Norton (1786–1853), American Unitarian
- Ann McBride Norton (1944–2020), American activist and business executive
- Anne Norton (born 1954), American political scientist
- Arthur Philip Norton (1876–1955), founder of Norton's Star Atlas
- Augustus Richard Norton (1946–2019), American educator and writer
- Barbara Norton (born 1946), American politician
- Bill Norton (born 2000), American football player
- Brad Norton (born 1975), American ice hockey player
- Brian Norton (engineer) (born 1955), British college president and solar energy technologist
- Caroline Norton (1808–1877), English feminist, social reformer, and author
- Charles Eliot Norton (1827–1908), American scholar
- Christopher Norton (born 1953), British composer, arranger, educationalist and record producer
- Christopher F. Norton (1821–1880), New York politician
- Daniel Sheldon Norton (1829–1870), American politician
- David L. Norton (1930–1995), American philosopher
- Doreen Norton (1922–2007), English nurse who developed a method for preventing bedsores
- Edgar Norton (1868–1953), English-American actor
- Edward Norton (born 1969), American actor
- Edward Felix Norton (1884–1954), British mountaineer
- Edward Lawry Norton (1898–1983), American electrical engineer
- Eleanor Holmes Norton (born 1937), American politician and delegate from Washington, D.C.
- Elijah Hise Norton (1821–1914), American politician
- Elizabeth Norton, British historian
- Elizabeth Norton (artist) (1887–1985), American artist
- Emma Norton, a British lawyer specialising in soldier's rights
- Ernest Norton (disambiguation), multiple people
- Eunice Norton (1908–2005), American pianist
- Fletcher Norton, 1st Baron Grantley (1716–1789), English politician
- Gale Norton (born 1954), American lawyer and politician
- George A. Norton (1880–1923), American popular songwriter, lyricist for "My Melancholy Baby"
- George P. Norton (1858–1939), British accountant
- Gerard Ross Norton (1915–2004), South African Army officer
- Gil Norton, British record producer
- Graeme Norton, New Zealand rugby league football coach
- Graham Norton (born 1963), Irish comedian (a stage name – real surname Walker)
- Greg Norton (born 1959), American bassist and restaurateur
- Greg Norton (baseball) (born 1972), American baseball player
- Sir Gregory Norton, 1st Baronet (1603–1652), English Member of Parliament
- Heather Norton (born 1966), British judge
- Hiram Norton (c. 1799 – 1875), merchant and historical figure in Upper Canada
- Homer Norton (1896–1965), American athlete and coach
- James Norton (South Carolina politician) (1843–1920), American politician
- James A. Norton (1843–1912), American politician
- James Lansdowne Norton (1869–1925), English inventor best known for founding the Norton Motorcycle Company
- Jeff Norton (born 1965), American ice hockey people
- Jenna Norton, American public health scientist
- Jim Norton (disambiguation), several people
- Joe Norton (footballer) (1888–1972), English footballer
- Joe Norton (politician) (1949–2020), Canadian politician
- John Norton (disambiguation), several people
- José Norton de Matos (1867-1955), Portuguese general and politician of English ancestry
- Emperor Norton (Joshua A. Norton) (1819-1880), self-proclaimed Emperor of the United States
- Judy Norton Taylor (born 1958), American actress
- Keith Norton (1941–2010), Canadian politician
- Ken Norton (1943–2013), American heavyweight boxer
- Ken Norton, Jr. (born 1966), American football player, son of the above boxer
- Kendrick Norton (born 1997), American football player
- Kerry Norton-Smyser (1927–2013), née Norton, Australian actress
- Kerry Norton (born 1973), English actress
- M. Norton, English cricketer
- Margaret Cross Norton (1891–1984), American archivist
- Mary Norton (disambiguation), several people
- Michael Norton (disambiguation), several people
- Minerva Brace Norton (1837–1894), American educator and author
- Morilla M. Norton (1865-1916), American author
- Norman Norton (1881–1968), South African cricketer
- Paul Norton (disambiguation), several people
- Peter Norton (born 1943), American software engineer and founder of Peter Norton Computing
- Peter Norton (GC) (born 1962), British Army officer
- Peter Norton (historian) (born 1963), American historian focusing on the history of car politics and motordom
- Phil Norton (born 1976), former professional baseball pitcher
- Philip Norton, Baron Norton of Louth (born 1951), British author and academic
- Ralph Hubbard Norton (1875–1953), American art collector
- Richard Norton (disambiguation), several people
- Rictor Norton (born 1945), American writer
- Rosaleen Norton (1917–1979), Australian occultist
- Rosanna Norton (1944–2025), American costume designer
- Sarah F. Norton, American feminist
- Sassona Norton, Israeli-American sculptor
- Scott Norton (born 1961), American professional wrestler
- Simon P. Norton (1952–2019), English mathematician
- Steve Norton, English rugby league footballer
- Storm Norton, NFL football player
- Susan Norton, English bridge player
- Tane Norton (1942–2023), New Zealand rugby union player
- Thomas Norton (1532–1584), English writer and politician
- Tim Norton (born 1958), Australian Catholic bishop
- Travis Norton (born 1976), Australian rugby league footballer
- Travis Norton (born 1980), Minneapolis musician, guitarist-vocalist in the punk rock band Semi Gods
- Wayne Norton (1942–2018), Canadian baseball player, coach and scout
- William Norton (disambiguation), several people
- Zach Norton (born 1981), American football player

== Fictional characters ==
- Ed and Trixie Norton, in the TV series The Honeymooners
- Isabelle Norton, in the Japanese light novel series Secrets of the Silent Witch
- Liz Norton, in the 2004 novel 2666
- Warden Samuel Norton, in the 1982 novella Rita Hayworth and Shawshank Redemption and 1994 film The Shawshank Redemption
- Susan Norton, in the 1975 novel 'Salem's Lot
- Mr. Norton, in the 1952 novel Invisible Man
- Dr. Dennett Norton, in the 2014 film RoboCop
- Dave Norton, an FIB agent in the 2013 game Grand Theft Auto 5
- Stephen Norton, in Curtain: Poirot's Last Case

== See also ==
- Justice Norton (disambiguation)
