= William Norton (disambiguation) =

William Norton (1900–1963) was the Irish Labour Party leader from 1932 through 1960.

Will, William or Bill Norton may also refer to:

== Literary figures ==
- William A. Norton (1810–1883), American engineer, educator and author
- William Warder Norton (1891–1945), American book publisher and founder of W. W. Norton
- William W. Norton (1925–2010), American Hollywood screenwriter

== Political figures ==
- William Norton (MP for Middlesex), English MP for Middlesex in 1391 and
- William Norton (MP for City of London)
- William Norton, 2nd Baron Grantley (1742–1822), British MP
- William Harrison Norton, American state senator from Missouri during 1950s

== Sports figures ==
- William Norton (cricketer) (1820–1873), English cricketer for Kent
- William Norton (rugby union) (1862–1898), Wales international three-quarter
- William G. Norton (before 1870–1895), American football coach
- William South Norton (1831–1916), English cricketer for Kent
- Billy Norton (footballer) (1901-1955), English footballer, see List of Bury F.C. players (1–24 appearances)
- Will Norton, English rugby player on List of 2020–21 RFU Championship transfers
- Bill Norton, American football player

== Other ==
- William R. Norton (1853–1938), American architect and founder of Sunnyslope, Arizona
