= Henry Hayman (cricketer) =

Henry Telford Hayman (20 November 1853 – 8 February 1941) was an English freemason, clergyman and amateur cricketer. He served in the Church of England in Nottinghamshire and Yorkshire between the 1870s and the late 1930s, was a particularly prominent freemason, acting as Provincial Grand Master of Nottinghamshire and played cricket in Kent and Nottinghamshire, where he also served on the committee of the county club.

== Early life and professional career ==
Hayman was born at West Malling in Kent and educated at Bradfield College in Reading before going up to Corpus Christi College, Cambridge in 1872. He graduated in 1876 and took up a post as a school teacher at Albert College in Framlingham. He was ordained as a Deacon in 1877 and became a priest in 1878, serving at St Andrew's Church in Nottingham from 1877 to 1879 before becoming Vicar of Ruddington in Nottinghamshire until 1884 when he moved to Edwinstowe where he remained until 1907. He was Rector at Thornhill in Yorkshire from 1909 to 1939 and was made a Canon of Wakefield Cathedral in 1933.

Alumni Cantabrigienses describes Haywood as "one of England's most prominent freemasons". He was Provincial Grand Master of Nottinghamshire from 1933 to 1941 and had been Grand Chaplain of Freemasons. He was also Chaplain of one of the battalions of the Nottinghamshire and Derbyshire Regiment for 28 years before having to retire having reached the maximum age limit for military service.

== Cricket ==
Hayman made two first-class cricket appearances for Kent County Cricket Club during the 1873 season, both against Sussex. He had played cricket at school and at University, although he did not make the Cambridge University team. He played in one minor match for the Gentlemen of Nottinghamshire in 1888 and was a member of the Committee of Nottinghamshire County Cricket Club from 1888 to 1904.

== Personal life ==
Hayman married Ellen Cobham Brewer, daughter of the scientist Ebenezer Cobham Brewer who lived with the family whilst they were at Edwinstowe. They had three children, Charles Telford, Percival and Phyllis. Charles attended St John's College, Cambridge and was headmaster at Winchester House Preparatory School in Brackley in Northamptonshire. His uncles Bradbury Norton, William South Norton and Selby Norton all played first-class cricket.

Hayman died in Cheltenham in 1941 aged 87.

== Bibliography ==
- Carlaw, Derek (2020). Kent County Cricketers, A to Z: Part One (1806–1914) (PDF). Cardiff: ACS.
