= E. H. Norton =

E. H. Norton may refer to:

- Edward Harrison Norton (born 1969), American actor
- Eleanor Holmes Norton (born 1937), American politician and delegate from Washington, D.C.
- Elijah Hise Norton (1821–1914), American politician
