= Senator Norton =

Senator Norton may refer to:

- Christopher F. Norton (1821–1880), New York State Senate
- Daniel M. Norton (1840s–1918), Virginia State Senate
- Daniel Sheldon Norton (1829–1870), Minnesota State Senate and U.S. Senator from Minnesota
- Eugene L. Norton (1825–1880), Massachusetts State Senate
- John N. Norton (1878–1960), Nebraska State Senate
- Michael Norton (politician) (1837–1889), New York State Senate
- Otis Norton (1809–1889), Wisconsin State Senate
- William Harrison Norton, Missouri State Senate
