= William Norton (cricketer) =

English cricketer

William Owens John Norton (c. 1820 – 25 April 1873) was an English cricketer who played in three first-class cricket matches for Kent County Cricket Club between 1853 and 1859. He played once for Kent against Surrey in 1853 and twice against Marylebone Cricket Club (MCC) in 1859, as well as playing regularly in other matches.

Norton was born at Aylesford in Kent in 1820 and was a nephew of Alfred Mynn, a significant figure in Kent cricket during the 1840s. Three cousins, Bradbury Norton, Selby Norton and William South Norton also played for Kent, the latter captaining the team between 1856 and 1870. He died in Lambeth in 1873 aged 53.

== Bibliography ==
- Carlaw, Derek (2020). Kent County Cricketers, A to Z: Part One (1806–1914) (PDF). Cardiff: ACS.
