= Justice Norton =

Justice Norton may refer to:

- Edward Norton (judge) (1808–1872), associate justice of the Supreme Court of California
- Elijah Hise Norton (1821–1914), associate justice of the Supreme Court of Missouri
- Milford Phillips Norton (1794–1860), associate justice of the Texas Supreme Court
- Heather Norton (b.1966), puisne judge of the High Court of England and Wales
