= Richard Norton (pilot) =

Richard D. Norton (c. 1939 – 1998) was an American pilot, scientist, and explorer. He was the pilot of the first single engine plane to fly around the world via the North and South Poles in 1987.

A graduate of Stanford University, he served in the US Air Force between 1961 and 1965. He was a pilot for TWA for 26 years. At TWA, he flew the Lockheed L-1011 Tristar. He was married to Lourdes Veras Norton.

He was the Director of the Institutes for the Achievement of Human Potential from 1982 to 1992.

On January 20, 1987, he started his record setting “Flight of the Arctic Tern” along with co-pilot, West German Calin Rosetti, from Paris’ famed Le Bourget airport, the site of Charles Lindberg's historic landing after his solo flight across the Atlantic. After a break due to the freezing of the wings of the aircraft, a Piper Malibu, just off the Arctic Circle, the pilots landed back at Le Bourget on June 15, 2017, during the Paris Air Show and successfully completed the first “round the world” flight in a single engine aircraft, via the poles.

He died of cancer at age 59.
