= 2019 English Channel Piper PA-46 crash =

2019 aviation accident in the English Channel

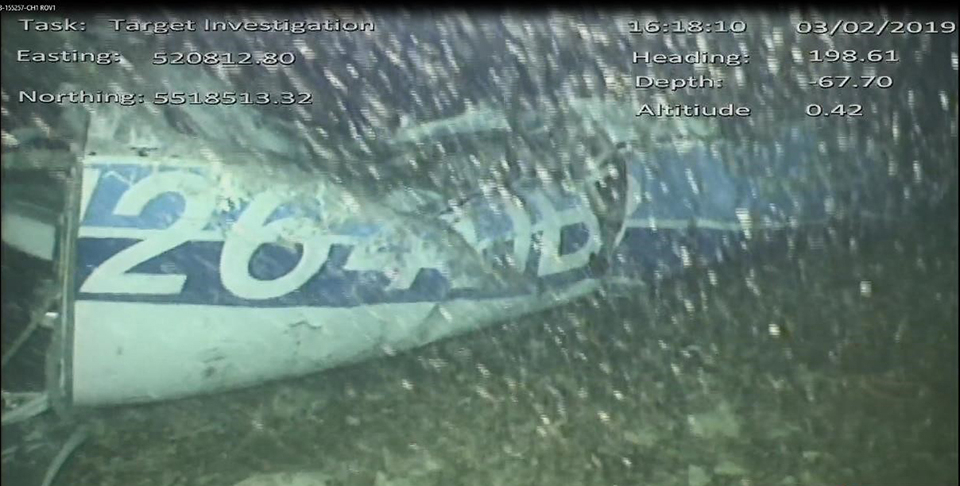
- Wreckage of the aircraft on the seabed

Accident
- Date: 21 January 2019
- Summary: Loss of control, mid-air breakup, crashed into the sea
- Site: English Channel, off Alderney, Channel Islands; 49.82°N 2.71°W

Aircraft
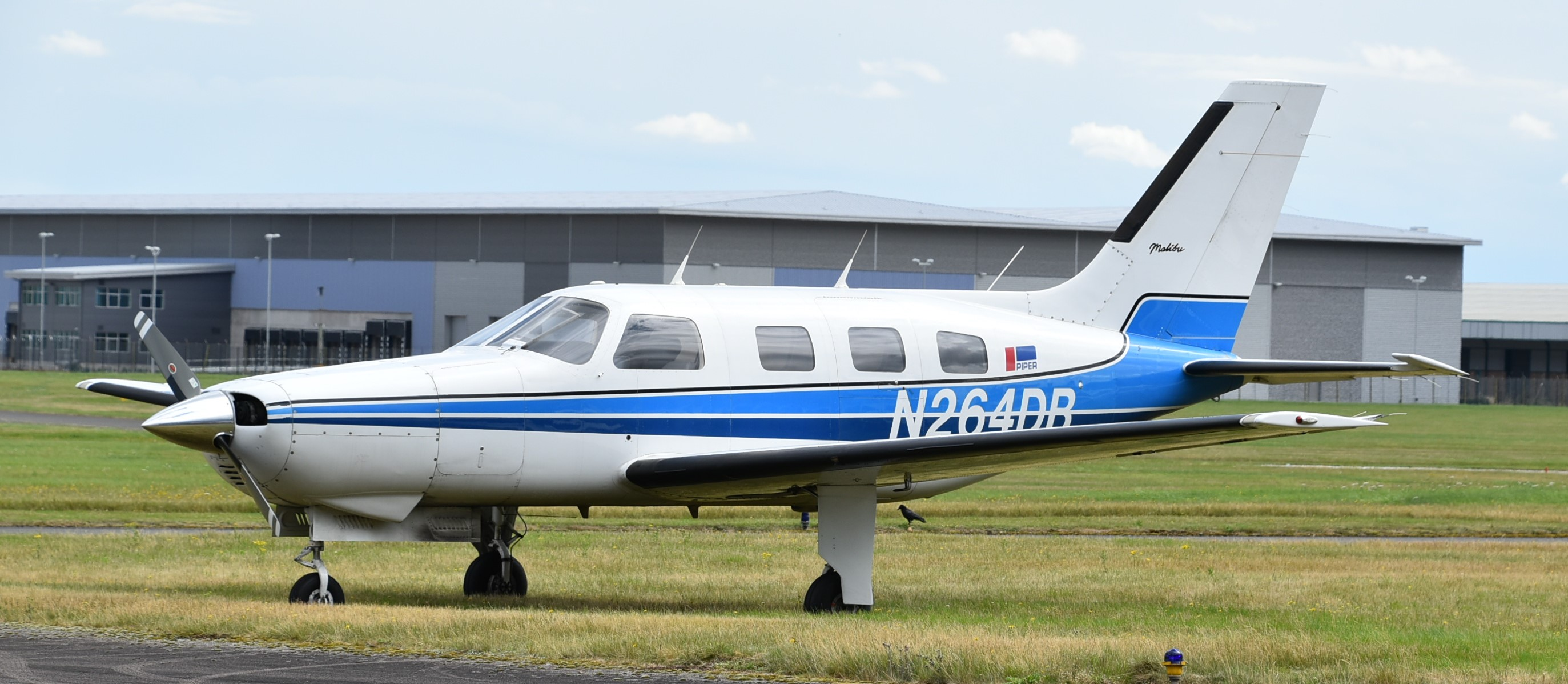
- N264DB, the aircraft involved in the accident, photographed in 2017
- Aircraft type: Piper PA-46 Malibu
- Registration: N264DB
- Flight origin: Nantes Atlantique Airport, Nantes, France
- Destination: Cardiff Airport, Cardiff, Wales
- Occupants: 2
- Passengers: 1
- Crew: 1
- Fatalities: 2
- Survivors: 0

On 21 January 2019, a Piper PA-46 Malibu light aircraft transporting Argentine football player Emiliano Sala crashed in the English Channel off Alderney in the Channel Islands. It had been travelling from Nantes, France, to Cardiff, Wales, where Sala was due to begin his career with Cardiff City.

Radar contact was lost when the aircraft was 13 nautical miles (24 km; 15 mi) north of Guernsey. After the search for survivors was abandoned on 24 January, a private search for wreckage was launched. Sala's body was recovered, but no trace of the pilot David Ibbotson was found.

The flight had taken place in cloudy conditions at night, and the Air Accidents Investigation Branch (AAIB) determined that Ibbotson lost control of the aircraft while manoeuvring to avoid cloud at an excessive airspeed, causing an in-flight breakup. Substantial amounts of carbon monoxide had leaked into the cabin, likely rendering Sala unconscious and impairing Ibbotson's judgement. Ibbotson's rating for flying the aircraft had expired in November 2018 which invalidated his licence, he was not qualified to fly at night, and he lacked recent practice flying in instrument meteorological conditions.

David Henderson organised the flight and was originally scheduled to be the pilot. He was found to have operated a commercial flight without holding the required licence or following regulations requiring higher operational standards that may have prevented the accident. He was charged with endangering the safety of an aircraft, was found guilty on 28 October 2021 after a trial at Cardiff Crown Court, and was jailed for 18 months.

== Disappearance ==
The aircraft departed from Nantes Atlantique Airport at 19:15 GMT (20:15 CET) bound for Cardiff Airport. Sala had been signed two days previously by Cardiff City Football Club from FC Nantes. The pilot was identified by Guernsey Police as David Ibbotson. Shortly before contact with air traffic control in Jersey was lost, a request was made by the pilot to descend from 5,000 to 2,500 feet (1,520 to 760 m), in order to maintain visual meteorological conditions (VMC). Radar contact was lost when the aircraft was at an altitude of 2,300 feet (700 m).

At 20:23 GMT, Guernsey Coastguard received an alert from Jersey air traffic control saying that a plane had gone off the radar around 13 nautical miles (24 km; 15 mi) north of Guernsey. The plane was then around 7 nautical miles (13 km; 8 mi) northwest of Alderney, Channel Islands, near Casquets lighthouse.

The flight was arranged by football agent Willie McKay, who said that he was not involved in selecting the plane or the pilot. David Henderson had originally intended to fly the plane himself, but the flight was given to David Ibbotson. The flight plan showed that the plane was scheduled to take off at 09:00 GMT (10:00 CET) on 21 January, but was delayed until the evening.

== Aircraft ==
The aircraft involved was a Piper PA-46 Malibu, a six-seat type equipped with a single piston engine, registered in the United States as N264DB, serial number 46-8408037. The aircraft was manufactured in 1984. The Certificate of Registration had been issued on 11 September 2015. The aircraft's last annual inspection had been conducted 11 flying hours before the accident. The aircraft did not carry and was not required to carry a carbon monoxide detector. It carried a valid registration and a valid airworthiness certificate, but was being operated under US Federal Aviation Regulations Part 91, which allowed only private flights and not air charter.

Ibbotson and Sala had expressed misgivings about the aircraft. In a telephone conversation after landing at Nantes, Ibbotson described it as "dodgy" and recounted how he had heard a bang while they were mid-channel. In a WhatsApp audio message sent just before takeoff on the return flight, Sala said "I am now on board a plane that seems like it is falling to pieces... If you do not have any more news in an hour and a half, I don't know if they need to send someone to find me. I am getting scared!" Cardiff City had offered Sala a commercial flight from Paris, but he said that he had made alternative arrangements and would be training with his new teammates on the morning after the flight.

N264DB was registered to a trustee, the Southern Aircraft Consultancy in Bungay, Suffolk, United Kingdom. Henderson managed operations of the aircraft on their behalf. Six months earlier, the owners had told Henderson not to let Ibbotson fly it because he committed airspace violations when he flew it previously.

== Search ==
A search and rescue operation was launched, but was suspended at 02:00 GMT on 22 January due to worsening weather conditions. Although the area was outside the United Kingdom's area of responsibility, Her Majesty's Coastguard sent two helicopters to assist in the search for the aircraft. A French helicopter was also sent to participate in the search, as were the Alderney and Guernsey lifeboats.

The search resumed at 08:00 GMT on 22 January. By 11:45 GMT, a total of 755 square nautical miles (2,590 km^{2}; 1,000 sq mi) had been covered by five aircraft and two lifeboats, but no trace of the aircraft had been found. A French Navy vessel also participated in the search. As of 15:30 GMT on 22 January, one aircraft and one lifeboat were still searching, bringing the total area covered to 872 square nautical miles (2,991 km^{2}; 1,155 sq mi). The search was again suspended in the evening of 22 January. Floating objects were found. The search resumed at 08:00 GMT on 23 January with two aircraft searching coastal areas around Alderney. As of 11:30 GMT, a helicopter and three aircraft were continuing the search and trying to review satellite imagery and mobile phone data; there was still no trace of the missing aircraft.

On 23 January, the Channel Islands Air Search said they had abandoned hope of finding any survivors in the water. The search then focused on the possibility that survivors were on a life raft in the English Channel. The official search was called off on 24 January because the chances of survival were said to be "extremely remote". The search had covered 1,284 square nautical miles (4,403 km^{2}; 1,700 sq mi) of land and sea, covering Burhou, Les Casquets, Alderney, the north coast of the Cherbourg Peninsula, and the north coast of Jersey and Sark.

== Salvage activity ==
Sala's family launched a fundraising appeal to find his body and a private search was launched on 26 January, funded by £259,000 raised in donations, via website GoFundMe. On 28 January, marine scientist David Mearns, who led the search, announced that a search vessel with an unmanned remotely operated underwater vehicle (ROV) was expected to be in place "by the end of the week". They planned to focus on some 25 square nautical miles (86 km^{2}; 33 sq mi) of the seabed; the last known position of the aircraft was north of Hurd's Deep. In the meantime, two fishing boats were being used to carry out a surface search of the area. Mearns engaged the FPV Morven for the search.

On 30 January 2019 the Air Accidents Investigation Branch (AAIB) reported that two seat cushions, found on a beach near Surtainville in France, were likely to be from the missing aircraft. AAIB identified a priority search area of approximately four square nautical miles (14 km^{2}; 5 sq mi) and commissioned a survey vessel from the British Ministry of Defence with sonar equipment to search the seabed for the aircraft. The AAIB search carried out by the vessel Geo Ocean III started on 3 February, together with the private search. The planned search was to cover an area of four square nautical miles (14 km^{2}; 5 sq mi) about 24 nautical miles (44 km; 28 mi) north of Guernsey. The search area was divided between the two teams.

On 3 February, wreckage of N264DB was found on the seabed at about 0.5 nautical miles (1 km; 0.6 mi) from the last known location. The wreckage was at a depth of 220 feet (67 m). Images from the AAIB search remote submersible had shown the registration mark and at least one body inside the wreckage. The vertical stabiliser, the horizontal stabiliser, and the outer panels of both wings were missing, and the damage to the cockpit was so severe that it was impossible to determine control positions or flight instrument readings with any confidence.

Sala's body was recovered from the wreckage on 7 February and taken to the Isle of Portland to be passed to the Dorset coroner. His body was identified by means of fingerprint evidence. Attempts to recover the aircraft wreckage were unsuccessful and poor weather conditions forced the salvage team to return the ROV to the ship. On 11 February, the results of a post-mortem reported that Sala had died of "head and trunk injuries".

The daughter of the pilot David Ibbotson launched a crowdfunding appeal to locate his body, which raised over £250,000, including a donation of £27,000 from French footballer Kylian Mbappé. The money raised was used to pay for a second dive to the wreck on 27 February and for a helicopter search of coastal areas in the Channel Islands, but no body was found.

== Investigation ==
The crash site lies in international waters. Under Annex 13 to the Convention on Civil Aviation, the National Transportation Safety Board (NTSB) had responsibility for investigating the accident because the aircraft was registered in the United States. The NTSB, in agreement with the Air Accidents Investigation Branch (AAIB) delegated responsibility for the investigation to the AAIB because the aircraft was based in the UK. On 23 January 2019, the AAIB opened an investigation into the accident. Assistance was given by France's Bureau d’Enquêtes et d’Analyses, the British Civil Aviation Authority (CAA), the European Union Aviation Safety Agency, Argentina's Junta de Investigación de Accidentes de Aviación Civil and the NTSB.

Part of the investigation covered the operational aspects related to the accident including licensing and flight plans. David Ibbotson had undergone training to become a commercial pilot between 2012 and 2014, but had dropped out before it was completed; his private pilot licence did not permit him to carry passengers for profit. Ibbotson's type rating for the Piper Malibu had expired months prior to the crash. While at Nantes Atlantique Airport, Ibbotson had posted on Facebook that he was "a bit rusty" with the instrument landing system on the Piper Malibu.

Post mortem tests on Sala's body showed exposure to carbon monoxide (CO) with a carboxyhemoglobin level of 58%, which could have led to symptoms including seizure, unconsciousness or a heart attack. The AAIB considered it likely that the pilot would also have been exposed to CO. The AAIB said that it had no plans to raise the wreckage of the plane from the seabed, saying "In this case, we consider that it will not add significantly to the investigation and we will identify the correct safety issues through other means."

The accident investigation prompted the CAA to publish a leaflet, Legal to Fly, to advise travellers how to identify and avoid unlicenced air charters.

=== AAIB final report ===
The AAIB published its final report into the accident on 13 March 2020. The AAIB attributed the accident to a loss of aircraft control (LOC) during a series of turns most likely initiated to "remain in or regain VMC" while flying "significantly in excess of [the Piper's] design manoeuvring speed". The direct cause of the crash was found to be an in-flight breakup following failure of the horizontal stabiliser. Additionally, Ibbotson was "probably affected by CO poisoning".

The Piper was equipped with an autopilot that had been placarded as inoperative (INOP) in 2017 for repeatedly disengaging without pilot input. A mechanic had recommended installing an updated computer, but the AAIB found no evidence indicating any repair had been performed, and investigators were given "conflicting information" whether the INOP placard was still in place during the preceding outbound flight. The AAIB concluded from radar data that the aircraft had most likely been flying on autopilot shortly before the final series of turns, but could not determine whether the system had disengaged unexpectedly or been switched off deliberately. The AAIB speculated that Ibbotson might have been distracted by the autopilot malfunctioning.

Shortly before the crash, Ibbotson initiated a series of turns to remain in VMC, culminating in a final high-speed descending turn to the right and a pull-up manoeuvre that exceeded the strength of the horizontal stabiliser. After it failed, the aircraft would have violently pitched down, causing aerodynamic forces to break away the outer wing panels and vertical stabiliser. This accident sequence and the damage to the aircraft wreckage were consistent with three past PA-46 LOC accidents analyzed by the AAIB.

The AAIB was unable to determine with certainty what caused CO to enter the cabin, but said it was most likely caused by a failed heater muff leaking exhaust gasses into the cabin heating system. The heater muff had been visually inspected during the aircraft's recent annual inspection but there was no evidence it had been pressure-tested; in a previous unrelated PA-46 accident analyzed by the AAIB, the heater muff had failed six flying hours after inspection. If the operator had followed commercial regulations, a pressure test would have been performed.

The AAIB concluded that Ibbotson was not licensed to fly the plane as his rating had expired in November 2018, that he was not qualified to fly at night, and that he lacked recent practice flying in instrument meteorological conditions. The AAIB stated that "loss of control was made more likely because the flight was not conducted in accordance with safety standards applicable to commercial operations." The investigation stated that "neither the plane nor the pilot had the required licences or permissions to operate commercially." The report concluded that Sala would have been "deeply unconscious" due to carbon monoxide poisoning at the time of the crash, but that Ibbotson was still conscious and in control of the plane up to the time of the crash. The AAIB recommended that aircraft be required to carry active CO detectors.

During the flight from Cardiff to Nantes, Ibbotson reported hearing a "bang" or "boom". The AAIB could not determine what caused this, or whether it was a factor in the accident.

== Legal proceedings ==
In September 2019, the director of the company responsible for security at the mortuary in Bournemouth was jailed for 14 months, for accessing CCTV footage of Sala's post-mortem and posting it on Twitter. One of her employees was jailed for 5 months on the same charge of computer misuse.

In June 2019, Dorset Police arrested David Henderson on suspicion of manslaughter by an unlawful act in respect of the death of Sala. Henderson had arranged the flight and had originally intended to fly the plane. Police decided not to proceed with the case for manslaughter, but on 26 October, Henderson appeared at Cardiff Crown Court, via video link, charged with endangering the safety of an aircraft and attempting to discharge a passenger without valid permission or authorisation. Henderson pleaded not guilty to both charges and was granted bail until 18 October 2021. On that date, he pleaded guilty to a charge of attempting to discharge a passenger without permission or authorisation. The court uncovered communications before the flight in which Henderson discussed Ibbotson's inadequate qualifications and asked others not to talk about the flight because "questions may be asked about his flying". On 28 October, Henderson was convicted on the charge of endangering the safety of an aircraft and jailed for 18 months. In his sentencing remarks, Mr Justice Foxton said that Henderson had been aware that David Ibbotson was not qualified to fly at night, but had allowed the flight to go ahead because delaying it would have led to increased handling and landing fees. In February 2022, Henderson was refused leave to appeal against the sentence.

Cardiff City FC sought €115 million compensation from FC Nantes after Sala's death, alleging negligence on FC Nantes' part. In March 2026 the Tribunal de Commerce de Nantes ruled that FC Nantes was not liable.

== Inquest ==
Following Henderson's conviction in October 2021, the inquest into the two deaths opened on 15 February 2022 in Bournemouth. It concluded on 17 March with the verdict that Sala and Ibbotson had been affected by carbon monoxide poisoning from the plane's engine before the crash. The jury said that Ibbotson may have "felt under pressure" to fly due to the importance of the customer, while the coroner called for tighter regulation of unlicenced commercial flights.

== See also ==
- 2017 Sydney Seaplanes DHC-2 crash - another light aircraft crash caused by carbon monoxide poisoning in the cockpit.
