= Selby Norton =

English cricketer and doctor

Selby Norton (13 September 1836 – 11 November 1906) was an English medical doctor who played one first-class cricket match for Kent County Cricket Club. He was born at West Malling in Kent and died in Brixton.

Norton made an appearance in 1860 for the Gentlemen of Kent, but his only first-class appearance came three years later against Nottinghamshire. A medical doctor by trade, Norton was called up to play in an emergency by his brother South Norton, who was the county captain at the time.

Another brother, Bradbury Norton, and a nephew, Henry Hayman, also played first-class cricket.

== Bibliography ==
- Carlaw, Derek (2020). Kent County Cricketers, A to Z: Part One (1806–1914) (PDF). Cardiff: ACS.
