= Bradbury Norton =

English cricketer and lawyer

Bradbury Norton (23 August 1834 – 21 February 1917) was an English lawyer and amateur cricketer.

Norton was born at Town Malling in Kent. He played in ten first-class cricket matches for Kent between his debut in 1858, and his final match in 1866. Norton's brother, William South Norton, was captain of the Kent team at the time and honorary secretary of the county club formed at Maidstone in 1859. As well as playing for Kent, Norton also made appearances for the Gentlemen of Kent between 1860 and 1869. Another brother, Selby Norton, made a single first-class appearance for Kent as an emergency replacement in 1863 and a cousin, William Norton, played for them three times.

Professionally Norton was a lawyer working in Kent. He died in 1917 at Taltal in Chile aged 82.

== Bibliography ==
- Carlaw, Derek (2020). Kent County Cricketers, A to Z: Part One (1806–1914) (PDF). Cardiff: ACS.
