= Piper PA-46 =

Single engine general aviation aircraft family

PA-46 / M-Class
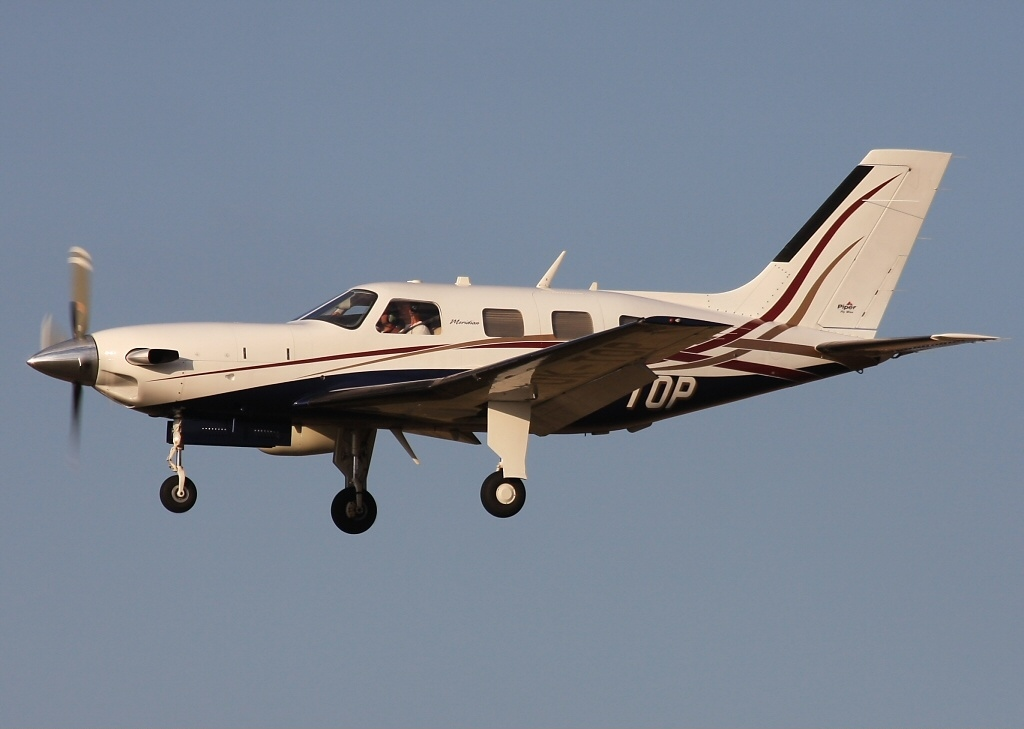
- PA-46-500TP Malibu Meridian

General information
- Type: Light aircraft
- National origin: United States
- Manufacturer: Piper Aircraft
- Status: In production
- Number built: 1,000 (as of early 2024)

History
- Manufactured: 1979—present
- First flight: 30 November 1979

The Piper M-Class (PA-46; formerly called the Malibu, Malibu Mirage, Malibu Meridian, and Matrix) is a family of American light aircraft manufactured by Piper Aircraft of Vero Beach, Florida. The aircraft is powered by a single engine, it can seat six. Twentieth-century production of the class was all piston engined (now M350; formerly Malibu, Malibu Mirage), but turboprop versions called the M500 (formerly Malibu Meridian), M600 and M700 (Fury) are now also available.

The M350 is the only pressurized piston-engined airplane in current production, as of 2026, giving a range of 1,343 nmi (2,487 km; 1,545 mi) in addition to a more comfortable cabin. It is recognized as one of the safest single-engine airplanes to fly by the airplane insurance industry.

FAA certification of the PA-46 Malibu was in 1983, the aircraft family has seen continuous production for more than four decades. An updated version of the Malibu called the Malibu Mirage (now M350) replaced its Continental engine with a more reliable (and powerful) Lycoming in 1988. Certification of a turboprop version called the Malibu Meridian (now M500) came in 2000. An unpressurized PA-46, the Matrix, was produced from 2008 to 2015. An extended-range version of the M500, called the M600, began production in 2016. A high-performance version of the M600, the M700 Fury, was announced in February 2024.

== Development ==
Work on the PA-46 began in the late 1970s, with a prototype (the PA-46-300T) first flying on November 30, 1979. The type was announced in November 1982, apparently to compete with Cessna's newest creation of the era, the P210 Centurion. Like the Centurion, the Malibu was to feature cabin pressurization 5.5 psi (380 hPa), a feature not included on the prototype.

== Variants ==
=== PA-46-310P Malibu ===
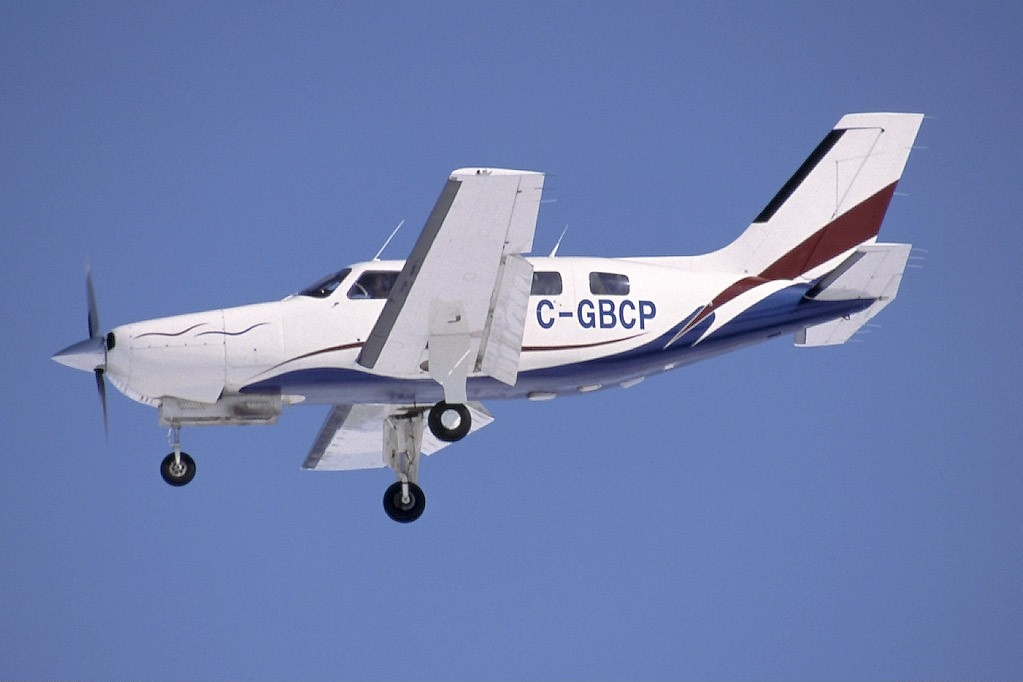
PA-46-310P Malibu

The original Malibu was the third pressurized single-engine piston civil airplane in existence, after the Mooney M22 (1965–1970) and Cessna P210N/R Pressurized Centurion (1978–1986), but has remained in production far longer. The first example of the initial production version flew in August 1982, and FAA certification obtained in September 1983. Deliveries started two months later. 404 aircraft with Continental TSIO-520 engines were built before this model was replaced in production by the PA-46-350P Malibu Mirage.

The PA-46-310P is powered by a Continental TSIO-520BE engine rated at 310 hp (230 kW). The PA-46-310P has lower fuel consumption, greater range, and the ability to cruise at "lean-of-peak." The PA-46-310P has a cruising range of 1,550 nmi (1,780 mi; 2,870 km) (with reserves), while the PA-46-350P initially had a maximum range of only 1,055 nautical miles (1,214 mi; 1,954 km), although this increased to 1,345 nautical miles (1,548 mi; 2,491 km).

The PA-46-310P Malibu set several world speed records: Seattle to New York November 23, 1987 averaging 259.27 mph (417.25 km/h); Detroit to Washington, DC January 4, 1989 averaging 395.96 mph (637.24 km/h); and Chicago to Toronto on January 8, 1989, aaveraging 439.13 mph (706.71 km/h). All three records were set by Steve Stout in his 1986 Malibu N9114B.

The Continental TSIO-520-BE powered Malibu was discontinued in 1988 following a series of incidents and accidents attributed to engine failures. One accident resulted in a settlement in which Teledyne Continental Motors paid $32,125,000 to a pilot injured in the crash of a Malibu.

=== PA-46-350P Malibu Mirage ===
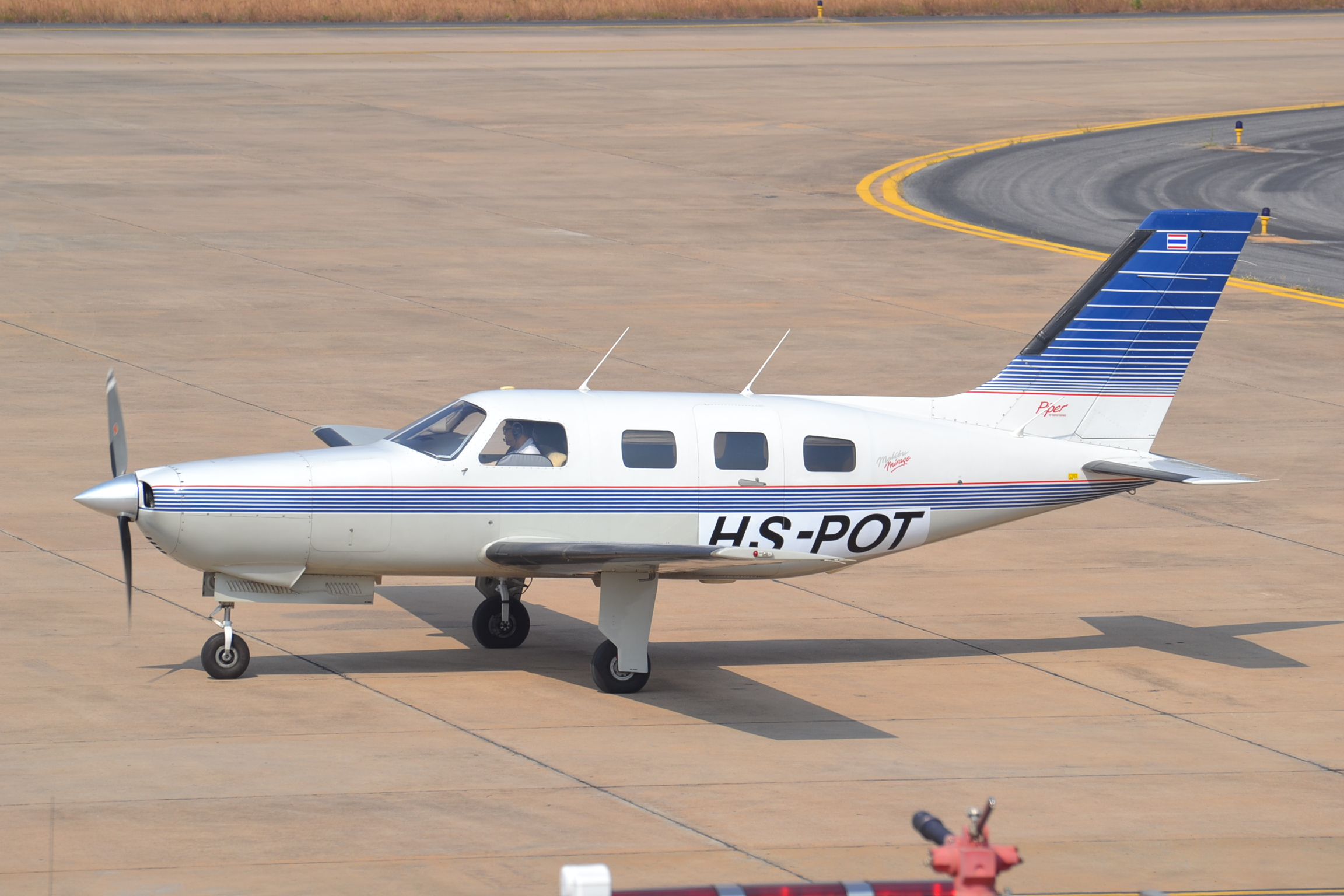
PA-46-350P Malibu Mirage

Production of the Malibu Mirage commenced in October 1988 for the 1989 model year. New features included a more powerful Lycoming TIO-540-AE2A 350 hp (260 kW) engine and a new wing. Various changes have occurred over the model years. Earlier models had an all-King panel and later this became largely Garmin, the Garmin G1000 glass cockpit is now standard.

In 1995, the pilot's windshield became a glass assembly (earlier it had been acrylic glass with a heat strip overlay). In 1996, numerous switches were moved to an overhead console. In 1999, the Mirage gained the strengthened wing designed for the turboprop Meridian.

=== PA-46-500TP Malibu Meridian ===
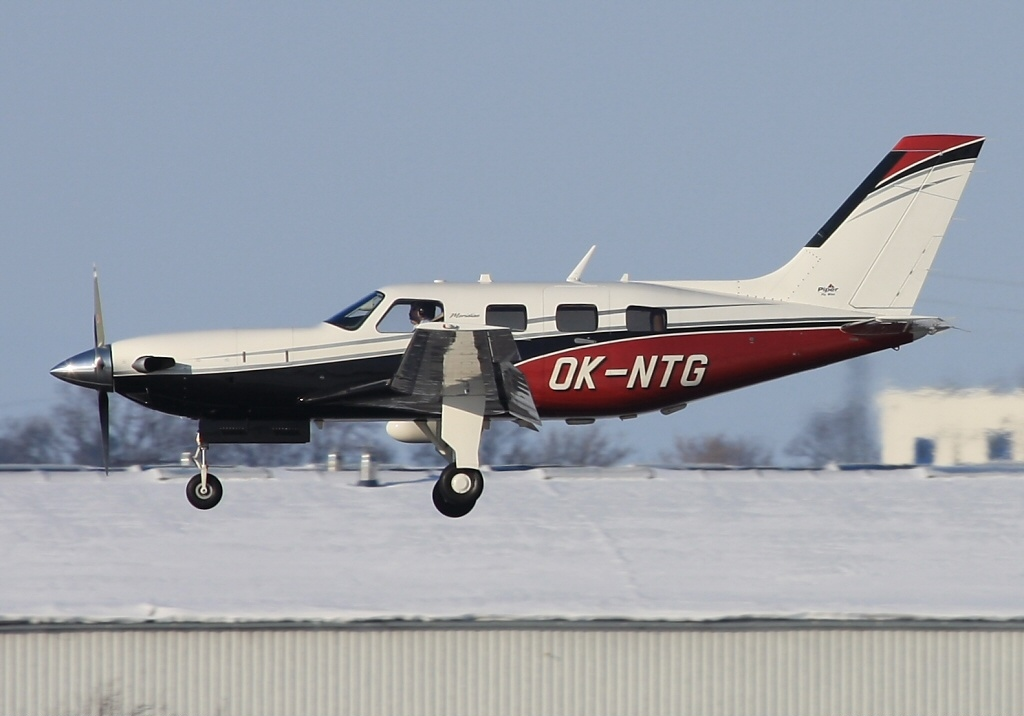
Piper PA-46-500TP Malibu Meridian

In 1997, Piper announced its intention to market a turboprop-powered version of the Malibu, and flew a prototype the following year powered by a Pratt & Whitney Canada PT6A-42A of 500 shp (370 kW). Certification was in September 2000, deliveries began in November that year. Changes were made to allow for the higher power of a turbine engine including larger wing and tail surfaces. In 2009, Piper offered the Meridian with a three-screen version of the Garmin G1000 including the Garmin GFC 700 autopilot as a replacement for the Avidyne Entegra system.

Piper added wing root filets to increase wing area and add 342 lb (155 kg) of fuel, a larger tailplane and a reinforced wing spar and landing gear, to allow a MTOW of 4,850 lb (2,200 kg) then 5,092 lb (2,310 kg) For a 1,000 nmi (1,200 mi; 1,900 km) trip, block fuel is 985 lb (447 kg) at 233 kn (268 mph; 432 km/h) block speed, maximum cruise speed is 260 kn (300 mph; 480 km/h).

=== Piper M-Class ===
Piper Aircraft no longer refers to their top-of-the-line aircraft with the names Malibu, Malibu Mirage or Malibu Meridian. The PA-46 line of aircraft, as of 2024, is now referred to as the Piper M-Class. The M350, M500, M600 and the newest M700 make up the M-Class line.

==== M350 ====
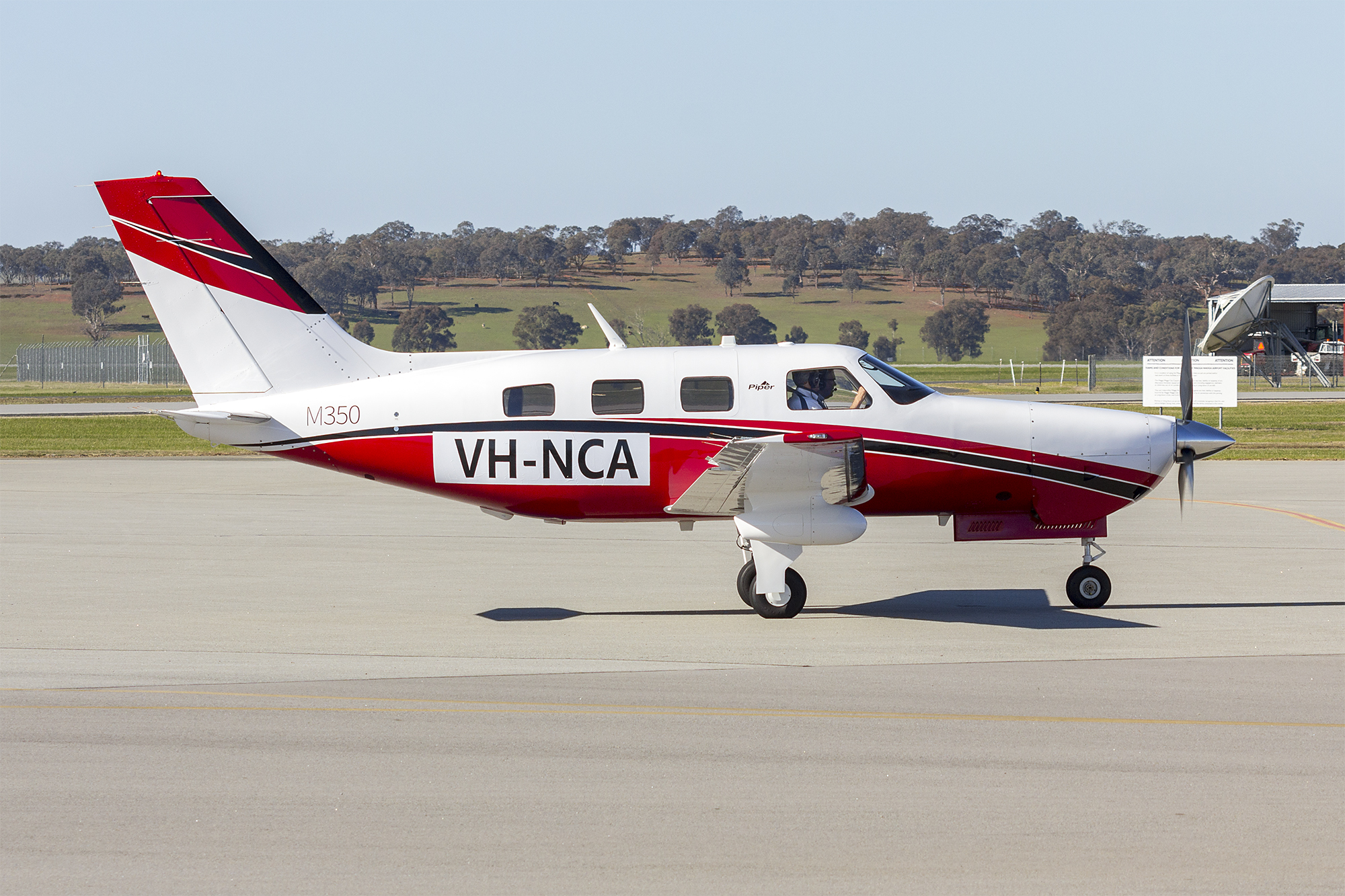
M350

The M350 is an updated version of the Mirage and is recognized as one of the safest single-engines by the airplane insurance industry.

The M350 is fitted with the same 350 hp (261 kW) turbocharged Lycoming TIO-540-AE2A engine and Hartzell three-bladed propeller as the Mirage. Improvements over the Mirage are an Ametek digital fuel quantity system and an improved Garmin G1000 NXi flight system. The new Garmin system has envelope-protection and anti-hypoxia tools. It will initiate an emergency descent in the case that the pilot becomes incapacitated as a result of hypoxia. The M350 is capable of cruising at 213 kn (245 mph; 394 km/h) with a range of 1,343 nmi (1,545 mi; 2,487 km). The plane has a service ceiling of 25,000 ft (7,620 m). No wind, standard day gross weight takeoff is achieved in 1,087 ft (331 m) and landing in 1,020 ft (311 m).

==== M500 ====
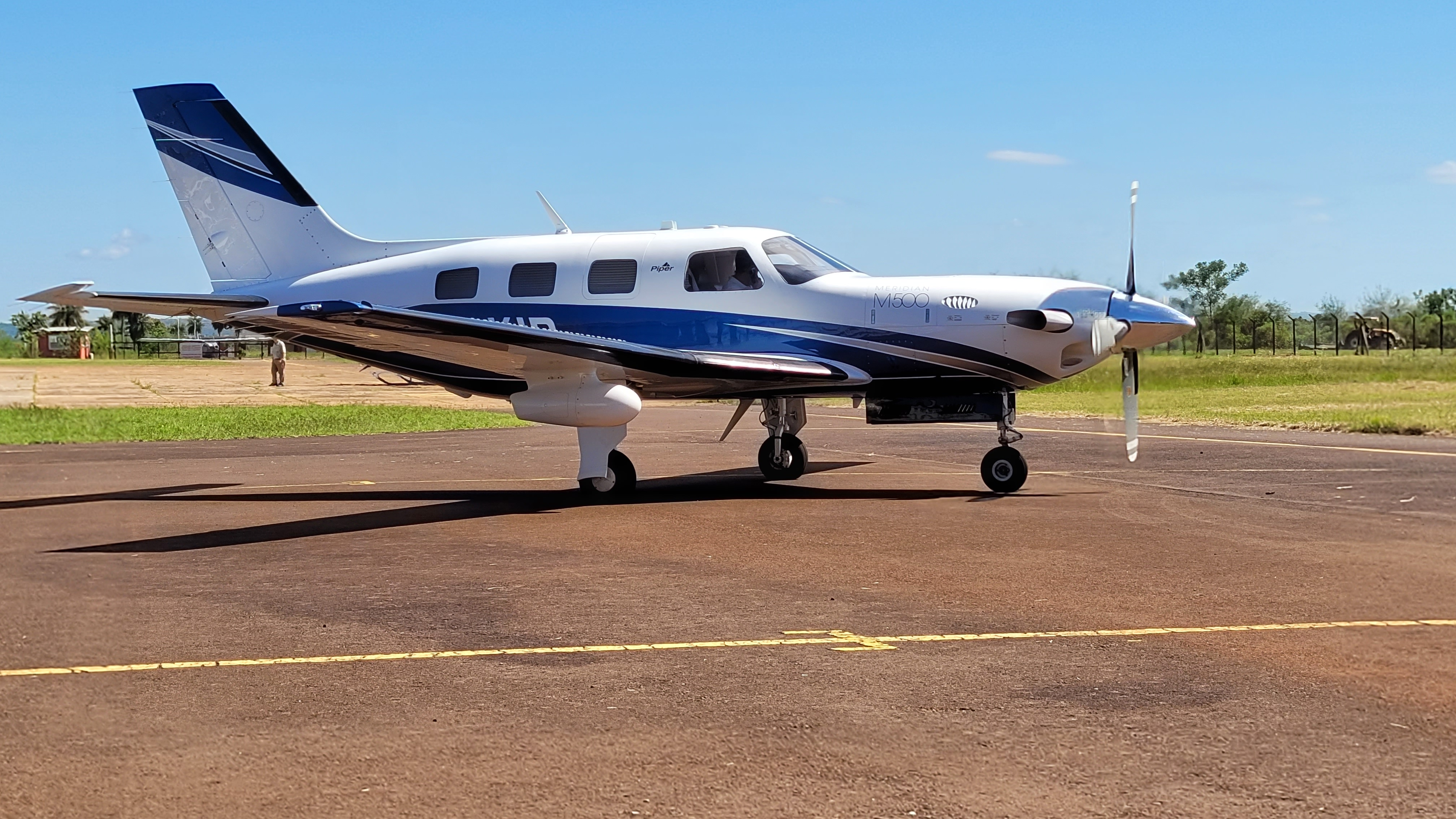
M500

The M500 is an updated version of the Meridian. It also has the updated Garmin G1000 NXi flight system, like the M350. The G1000 NXi system includes an automatic wings-level function and control override to prevent exceeding the plane's flight envelope. Its purpose is to maintain a safe, stable flight condition in the case of pilot disorientation or incapacitation. The safety feature is called Electronic Stability and Protection (ESP). The M500 also has ADS-B, but no FADEC. The M500's fuel tanks can carry 170 US gal (644 L) and its Pratt & Whitney PT6A-42A engine burns 37 US gal/h (140 L/h). It is a light plane with a maximum ramp weight of 5,135 lb (2,329 kg) and 5,092 lb (2,310 kg) MTOW. It cruises at 260 kn (299 mph; 482 km/h) at an altitude of 30,000 ft (9,144 m).

==== M600 ====
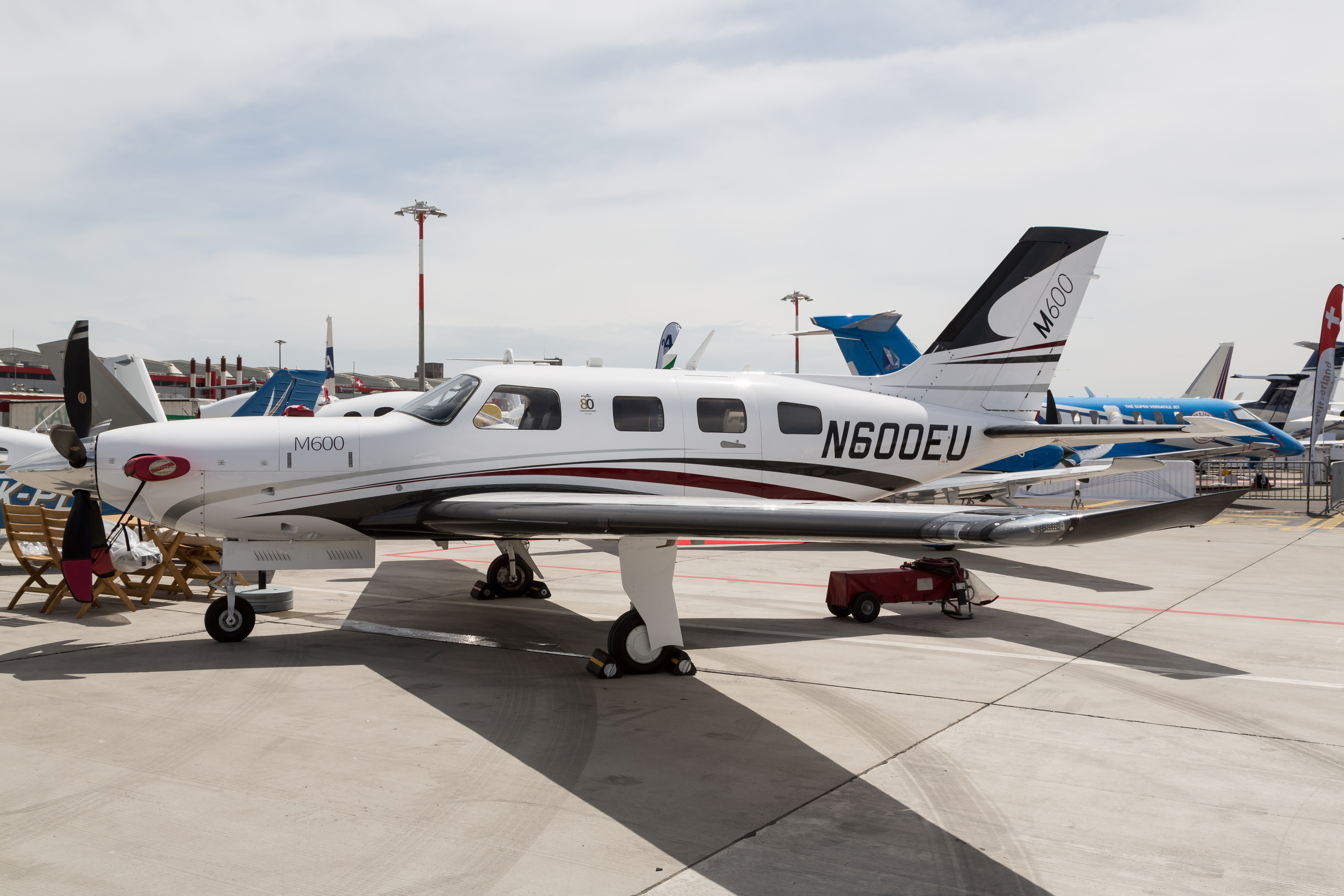
Piper M600

In 2015, Piper introduced the M600 (company designation PA-46-600TP), as an upgrade to the M500. The M600 is powered by a 600 hp (447 kW) PT6A-42A engine. The new M600 is equipped with the Garmin G3000, a new wing and more fuel capacity. The aircraft is more capable than the M500, as the M600 has greater range and a slightly higher top speed. It has anti-hypoxia tools like in the M350.

It received its FAA certification on June 18, 2016. Its NBAA Instrument Flight Rules (IFR) range is 1,484 nmi (1,708 mi; 2,748 km), up from 1,000 nmi (1,151 mi; 1,852 km) for the M500, and maximum cruise speed is 274 kn (507 km/h; 315 mph), up from the M500's 260 kn (480 km/h; 300 mph). The M600's MTOW is 6,000 lb (2,700 kg), up from the M500's 5,092 lb (2,310 kg), with a 260 US gal (980 L) fuel capacity, greater than the M500's 170 US gal (140 imp gal; 640 L). The M600's standard equipped weight is 200 lb (91 kg) higher than the M500's. Full-fuel payload for the M600 is 645 lb (293 kg) compared to 550 lb (250 kg) for the M500.

Between June 2016 and March 2018, 50 have been delivered, mostly in the U.S. and mostly are owner-flown. It offers nearly the range of the TBM 900 for much less cost, and can operate from shorter runways than very light jets like the Eclipse 500 or the Citation Mustang. It burns 350 lb (160 kg) (56.3 US gal [213 L; 46.9 imp gal]/hr) in the first hour, 300 lb (140 kg) (50 US gal [190 L; 42 imp gal]/hr) the second hour and 200 lb (91 kg) thereafter, averaging 270 lb/hr (45 US gal [170 L; 37 imp gal]) per hour.

Starting in 2020, Piper offered an emergency autoland system by Garmin, which initiates at the push of a button. Built into the G3000 integrated avionics for the new SLS model, the system will be a first in general aviation, along with the Cirrus Vision Jet. Piper calls the technology "HALO". Offered for $170,000 including extra equipment, it provides access to more than 9,000 runways over 4,500 ft (1,400 m). Transport Canada granted approval for the HALO system on August 3, 2023.

==== M700 Fury ====
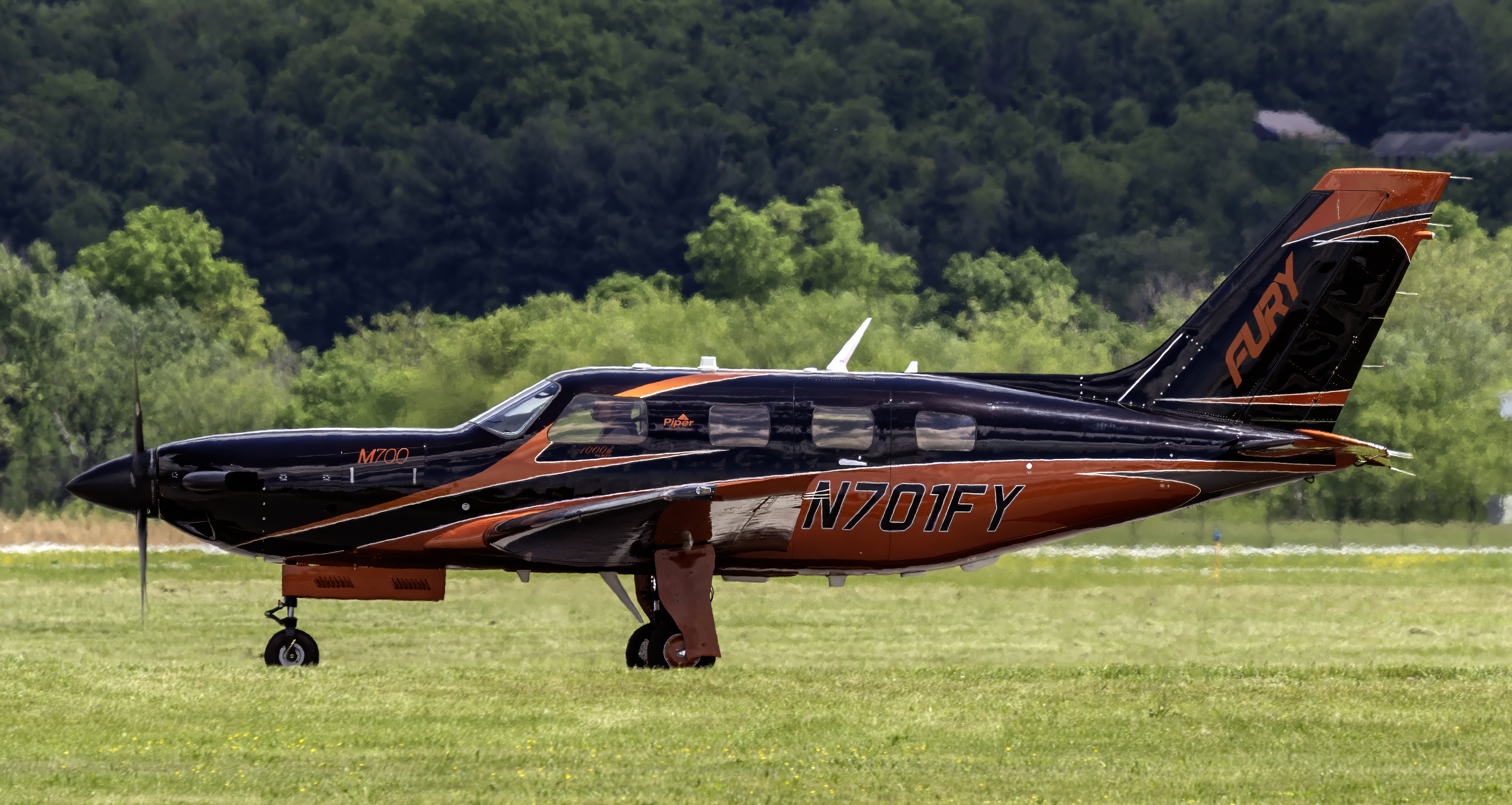
M700 Fury

In 2024, Piper unveiled the M700 Fury (company designation PA-46-701TP) to replace the M600. The M700 is powered by a 700 hp (522 kW) PT6A-52 engine and retains the Garmin G3000 avionics and HALO system of its predecessor. The first production M700 was the 1,000th PA-46 produced. The M700 received FAA certification on February 29, 2024, with Piper announcing that deliveries would begin immediately thereafter. In August 2024, Piper Aircraft announced that its M700 FURY received FAA certification for unpaved field operations. This approval marks a significant expansion in the aircraft's operational capabilities, allowing it to operate in more diverse and challenging environments, including remote and undeveloped airstrips.

=== PA-46R-350T Matrix ===
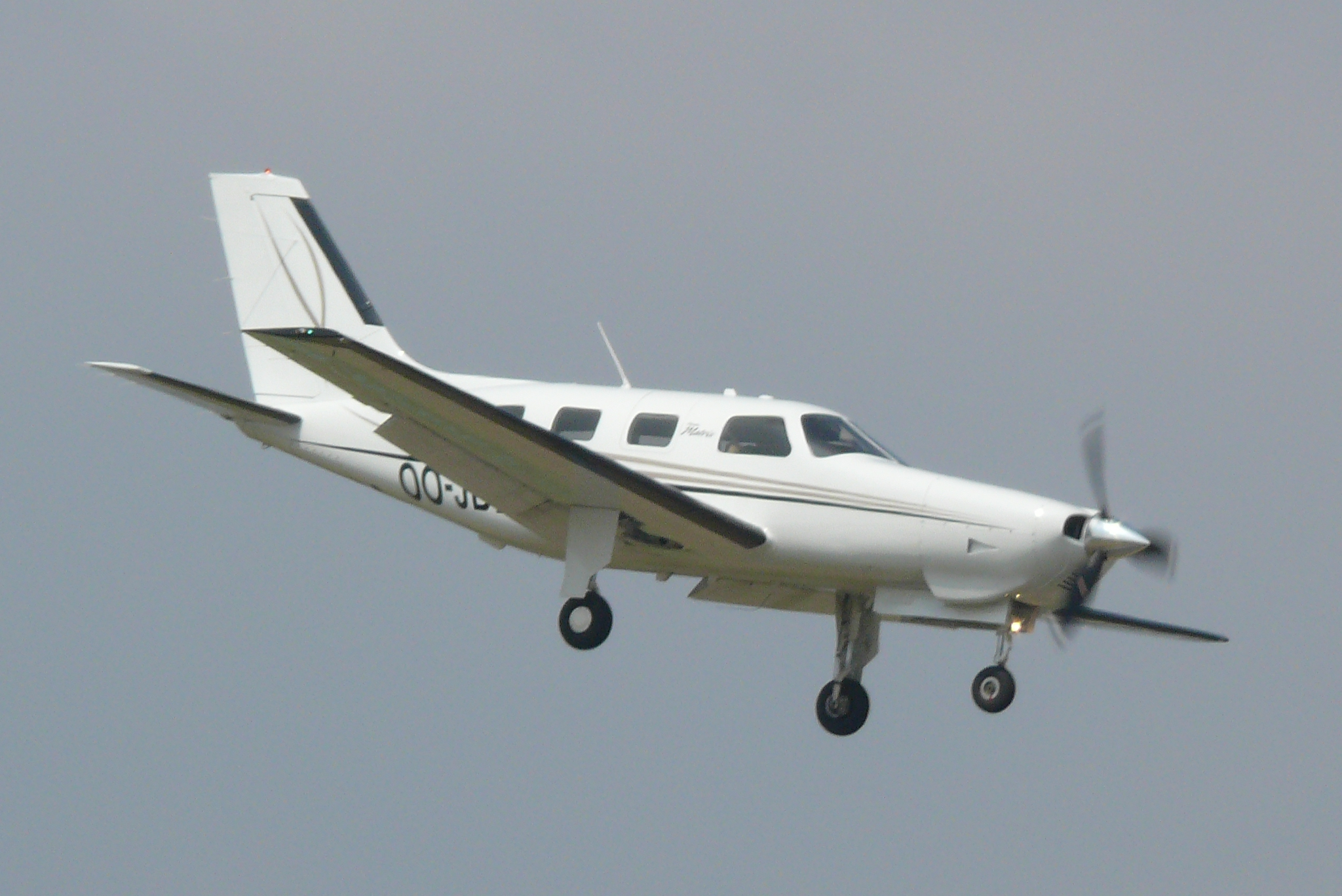
PA-46R-350T Matrix

In October 2007 Piper announced the Matrix, an unpressurized version of the Mirage. The new model was designated as the PA-46R-350T, indicating retractable landing gear, 350 horsepower (260 kW), and turbocharging.

Piper Aircraft marketed the Matrix as a cabin-class aircraft for Cirrus SR-22 and Cessna 400 owners to step up to. Standard equipment on the Matrix includes a built-in oxygen system, Avidyne Entegra glass cockpit, S-Tec 55X autopilot and air conditioning.

Major options on the Matrix included a de-ice system, an "Enhanced Situational Awareness Package", speed brakes, an avionics package featuring the Avidyne TAS610 dual antenna traffic advisory system, GWX-68 Weather Radar, and, beginning in 2010, the Garmin G1000 avionics system with twin 10" PFD's and a 15" MFD.

As with the Malibu Mirage, Matrix's powerplant is a turbocharged Lycoming TI0-540-AE2A producing 350 hp (260 kW). The aircraft's performance includes a cruise speed of 215 knots (247 mph; 398 km/h) at 25,000 feet (7,600 m), 215 knots (247 mph; 398 km/h) at 17,500 feet (5,300 m) and 188 knots (216 mph; 348 km/h) at 12,000 feet (3,700 m). Maximum takeoff weight is 4,340 lb (1,969 kg) and an empty weight of 2,937 lb (1,332 kg) giving a standard useful load of 1,421 lb (645 kg)).

Matrix deliveries began in early 2008. Production ended in 2015.

=== JetPROP ===
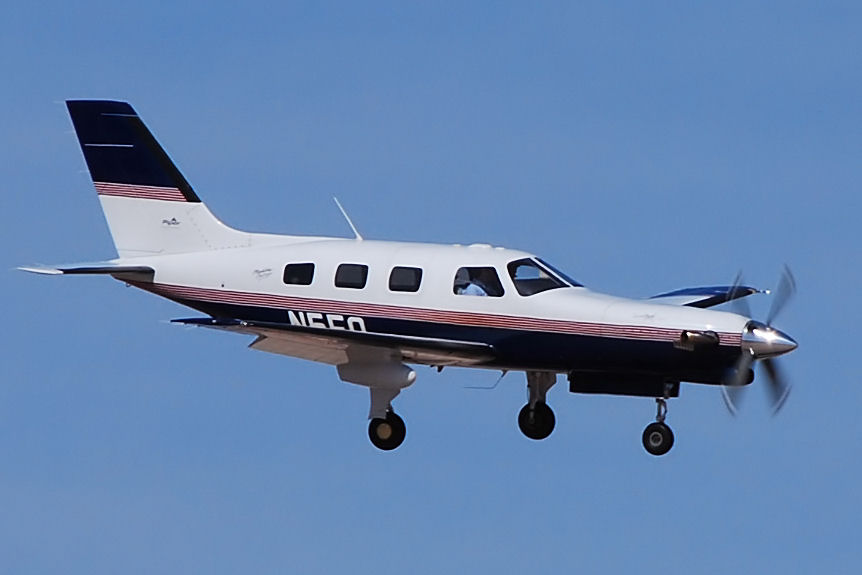
PA-46-350P JetPROP DLX turbine conversion

The JetPROP is an aftermarket turbine engine conversion for the PA-46-310P Malibu and PA-46-350P Malibu Mirage offered by Rocket Engineering of Spokane, WA. Originally certified in 1998 as the JetPROP DLX with a Pratt & Whitney PT6A-34 engine, conversions 90 and above used the P&W PT6A-35, after the -34 was discontinued. A lower cost JetPROP DL version became available in October 2003 utilizing the P&W PT6A-21. As of September 2008, 233 JetPROP conversions had been delivered. Twenty percent of the entire PA-46 fleet have been converted.

=== ZeroAvia HyFlyer ===
ZeroAvia, a Cranfield University partner, is a U.S./UK startup developing a Hydrogen fuel cell power train targeting to halve a turbine operating costs. It flight-tests a pair of 130 kW (170 hp) electric motors replacing the piston engine of a Piper Malibu Mirage in California. In September 2019, the UK government granted £2.7 million ($3.3 million) for its HyFlyer demonstrator, culminating in a 250–300 nmi (290–350 mi; 460–560 km) flight using hydrogen fuel cells. Other partners, including the Orkney Isles-based EMEC, Cranfield Aerospace Solutions, and fuel-cell developer Intelligent Energy should match this funding. The prototype made its maiden hydrogen-powered flight at Cranfield Airport on September 24, 2020.

== Production ==
PA-46 Shipments since 2000
| Model / Year | 2000 | 2001 | 2002 | 2003 | 2004 | 2005 | 2006 | 2007 | 2008 | 2009 | 2010 | 2011 | 2012 | 2013 | 2014 | 2015 | 2016 | 2017 | 2018 | 2019 | 2020 | 2021 | 2022 | Totals |
|---|---|---|---|---|---|---|---|---|---|---|---|---|---|---|---|---|---|---|---|---|---|---|---|---|
| M600 | – | – | – | – | – | – | – | – | – | – | – | – | – | – | – | – | 22 | 35 | 38 | 24 | 36 | 39 | 41 | 235 |
| M500 (Malibu Meridian) | 18 | 98 | 25 | 24 | 26 | 40 | 49 | 53 | 52 | 29 | 25 | 32 | 32 | 34 | 36 | 27 | 12 | 12 | 18 | 20 | 7 | 7 | 9 | 695 |
| M350 (Malibu Mirage) | 63 | 10 | 19 | 7 | 15 | 11 | 31 | 30 | 21 | 7 | 26 | 33 | 49 | 42 | 37 | 34 | 26 | 9 | 20 | 21 | 15 | 19 | 19 | 564 |
| Matrix | – | – | – | – | – | – | – | – | 101 | 33 | 23 | 17 | 12 | 16 | 11 | 2 | 0 | 0 | – | – | – | – | – | 215 |
| All | 81 | 108 | 44 | 31 | 41 | 51 | 80 | 83 | 174 | 69 | 74 | 82 | 93 | 92 | 84 | 63 | 60 | 56 | 76 | 65 | 58 | 65 | 69 | 1699 |

== Accidents and incidents ==
As of January 2019, 225 accidents had been reported in the Aviation Safety Network wiki database, including 106 hull losses, causing 219 fatalities.

- On 28 June 2007, a 2006 PA-46-500TP Malibu Meridian, tail number N477MN suffered an in-flight breakup near Wellsville, MO. The plane was carrying three executives of McC Inc. and Environmental Control Systems Inc.; grain handling companies involved in the ethonol industry, who were returning from the Fuel Ethanol Workshop in St. Louis, MO. Killed were Dave Kammerer, 41; Environmental Control Systems Inc., co-owner Waylon Karsten, 36; and founder/president of McC Inc., Dave McCormick 44. https://www.baaa-acro.com/sites/default/files/2019-05/N477MD.pdf
- On 21 January 2019, a 1984 PA-46-310P travelling from Nantes Atlantique Airport, France, to Cardiff Airport, Wales, crashed into the water off Alderney in the English Channel. Britain's Air Accidents Investigation Branch found the flight had operated under Visual Flight Rules (VFR) at night, in poor weather conditions, despite the pilot having no training in night flying and a lack of recent practice in instrument flying; as well as possible carbon monoxide poisoning of the pilot with no working sensor on board. The plane was carrying Argentine footballer Emiliano Sala, who had been signed by Cardiff City from FC Nantes two days earlier. The plane's wreckage was discovered on the seabed of the English Channel on 3 February, and Sala was confirmed to be dead on 7 February.
- On 30 June 2024, a Piper Malibu, registration N85PG, en route from Oneonta, New York to Charleston, West Virginia crashed in the hamlet of Trout Creek, New York, killing the pilot and his four passengers. The cause of the accident is under investigation.
- On 29 July 2024 a Piper Malibu, registration D-EOSE, en route from Goose Bay, Canada, to Narsarsuaq, Greenland, ditched in the sea near Qaqortoq, about 30 nm short of Narsarsuaq. The German pilots made a Mayday call and deployed their life raft; the Danish Arctic Command despatched an aircraft which quickly located the life raft and guided the Danish Navy ship Triton to pick up the pilots.
- On 10 October 2026, an aircraft reported to be a Piper PA-46 crashed approx 5 mi (4.3 nmi) west of the resort town of Wisconsin Dells, WI. All 6 people on board died in the accident. The plane had been cruising at 24,000 ft, when the pilot reported icing and began a descent which apparently ended with ground impact. An NTSB investigation is underway.

== Specifications ==
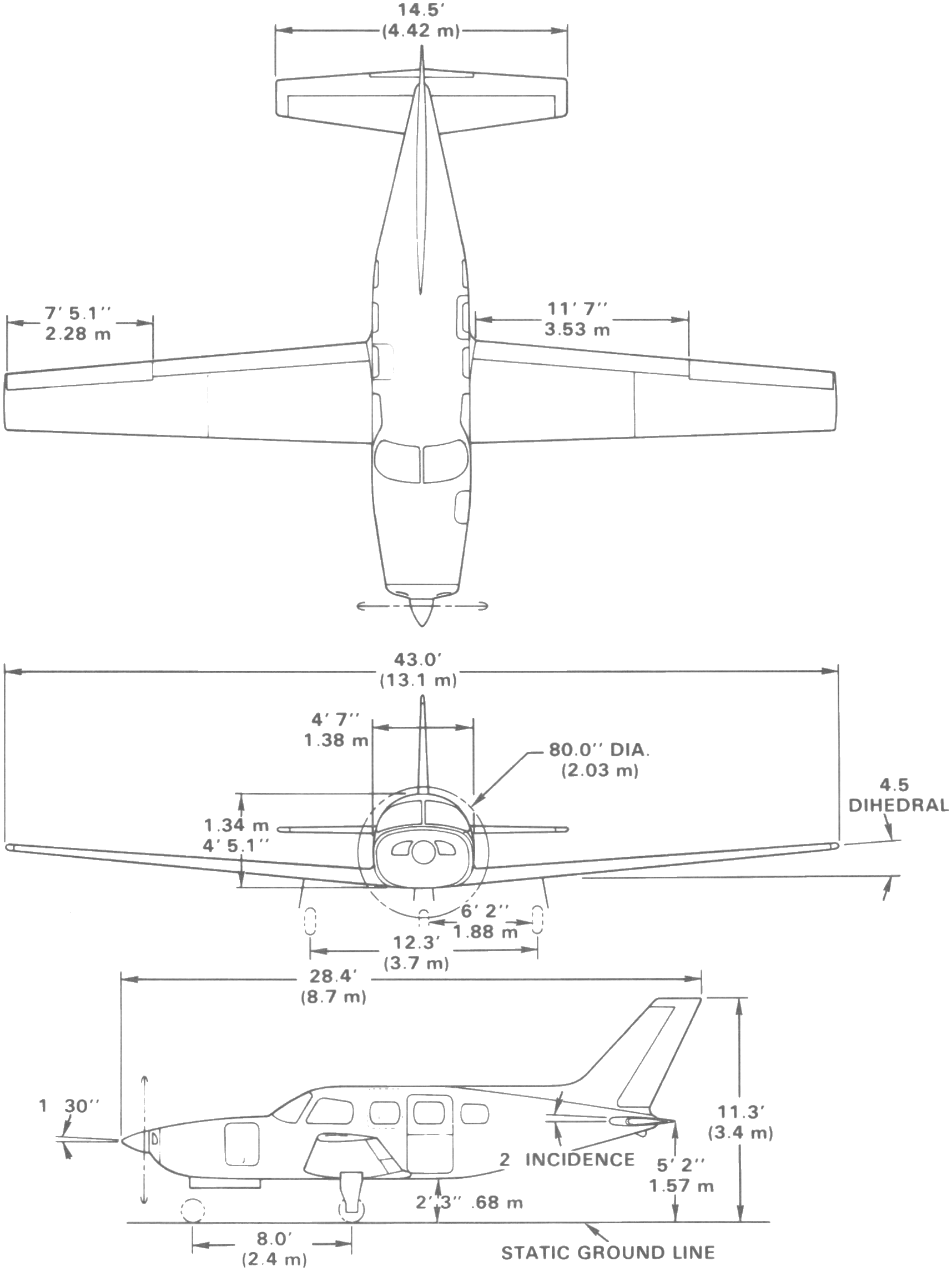
3-view line drawing of the Piper PA-46-310P Malibu

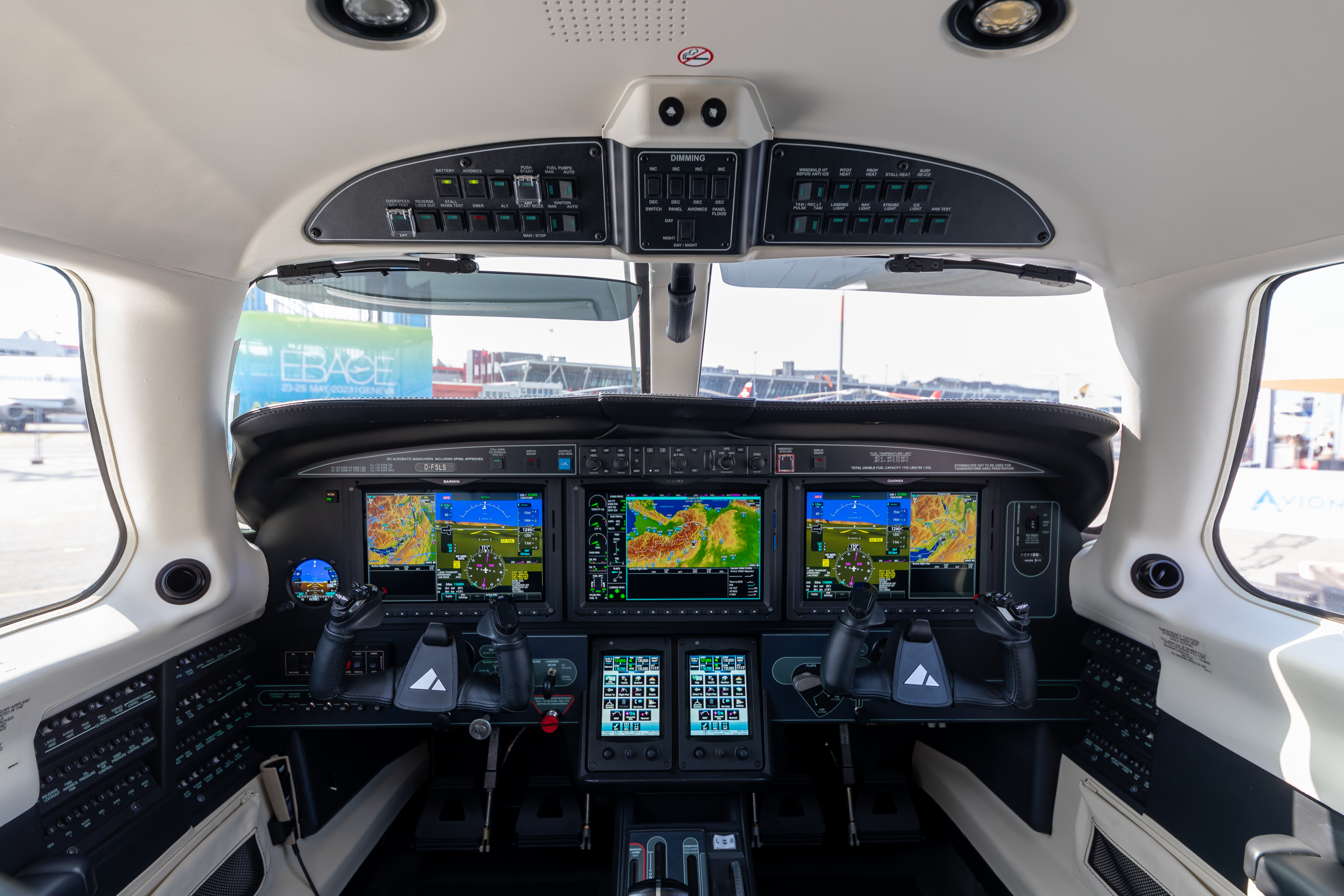
Cockpit of an M600/SLS, equipped with Autoland button above the right Primary flight display

| Model | Matrix | M350 | M500 | M600 | M700 |
|---|---|---|---|---|---|
| Seating | 6 | | | | |
| Cabin Volume | 201 ft^{3} (5.7 m^{3}) | | | | |
| Pressurization | None | 5.5 psi (0.38 bar) | | 5.6 psi (0.39 bar) | 5.5 psi (0.38 bar) |
| Wingspan | 43.0 ft / 13.11 m | | | 43.2 ft / 13.2 m | |
| Length | 28.11 ft / 8.6 m | | 29.6 ft / 9.02 m | 29.7 ft / 9.1 m | |
| Height | 11.3 ft / 3.44 m | | | | 11.5 ft / 3.5 m |
| MTOW | 4,340 lb / 1,969 kg | | 5,092 lb / 2,310 kg | 6,000 lb / 2,721 kg | |
| OEW | 3,003 lb / 1,362 kg | 3,050 lb / 1,383 kg | 3,436 lb / 1,559 kg | 3,650 lb / 1,656 kg | 3,730 lb / 1,692 kg |
| Fuel Capacity | 120 USgal / 454 L / 100 impgal | | 170 USgal / 644 L / 141 impgal | 260 USgal / 984 L / 216 impgal | |
| Constant-speed propeller | 3 blade | | 4 blade feathering, reversible | | 5 blade, reversible |
| Engine | Lycoming TIO-540-AE2A | | Pratt & Whitney PT6A-42A | | PT6A-52 |
| Power | 350 hp (260 kW) | | 500 hp (370 kW) | 600 hp (450 kW) | 700 hp (520 kW) |
| Maximum cruise | 213 kt / 395 km/h / 243 mph | | 260 kt / 482 km/h / 299 mph | 274 kt / 507 km/h / 315 mph | 301 kt / 557 km/h / 346 mph |
| Ceiling | 25,000 ft / 7,620 m | | 30,000 ft / 9,144 m | | |
| Range (45 minute reserve) | 1,343 nmi / 2,487 km / 1,545 mi | | 1,000 nmi / 1,852 km / 1,150 mi | 1,484 nmi / 2,748 km / 1,707 mi | 1,424 nmi (2,637 km; 1,639 mi) |
| Takeoff (50 ft obstacle) | 2,090 ft / 637 m | | 2,438 ft / 743 m | 2,635 ft / 803 m | 1,994 ft / 607 m |
| Landing (50 ft obstacle) | 1968 ft / 600 m | | 2,110 ft / 643 m | 2,659 ft / 810 m | 1,950 ft / 594 m |

== See also ==
Aircraft of comparable role, configuration, and era

- Cessna 210
- Extra EA-400
- Extra EA-500
- SOCATA TBM
