= Richard Norton =

Richard Norton may refer to:

== Politicians ==
- Richard Norton (fl.1414), British MP for Worcester 1414
- Richard Norton (died 1592) (1530–1592), English MP for Hampshire 1571, 1572
- Richard Norton (died 1732) (c. 1666-1732), English MP for Hampshire 1693-1700, 1702-1705
- Richard Norton (MP for Petersfield) (c. 1552–1611), MP for Petersfield 1572
- Richard Norton of Southwick Park (1615–1691), British Parliamentary colonel in English Civil War; MP and Governor of Portsmouth
- Richard Henry Norton (1849–1918), American politician from Missouri
- Richard Norton, 8th Baron Grantley (born 1956), British politician and financier
- Sir Richard Norton, 1st Baronet (1582–1646), English politician

== Others ==
- Richard Norton (justice) (died 1420), English justice
- Richard Norton (rebel) (1488–1588), English rebel descended from the justice, participated in the Rising of the North in 1569
- Richard Norton (professor) (1872–1918), American archaeologist, head of the American Volunteer Motor Ambulance Corps during World War I
- Richard Norton (actor) (1950–2025), Australian martial artist, action film star, and stuntman
- Richard Norton (actor, born 1970), Australian actor, who appeared in Neighbours and Home and Away
- Richard Norton (priest) (died 1523), British archdeacon of Barnstaple
- Richard Norton (pilot) (1939–1998), American pilot, scientist, and explorer
