= Paul Norton =

Paul Norton may refer to:

- Paul Norton (artist) (1909–1984), American artist
- Paul Norton (musician) (born 1961), Australian singer-songwriter best known for "Stuck on You"
- Paul Norton (rugby league), British rugby league player in the 1970s and 1980s
- Paul Norton (rugby league, Lancashire), rugby league prop in the 1990s and 2000s for Lancashire, Lancashire Lynx, and Oldham
