= Transfer of Emiliano Sala from FC Nantes to Cardiff City F.C. =

Footballer transfer in 2019

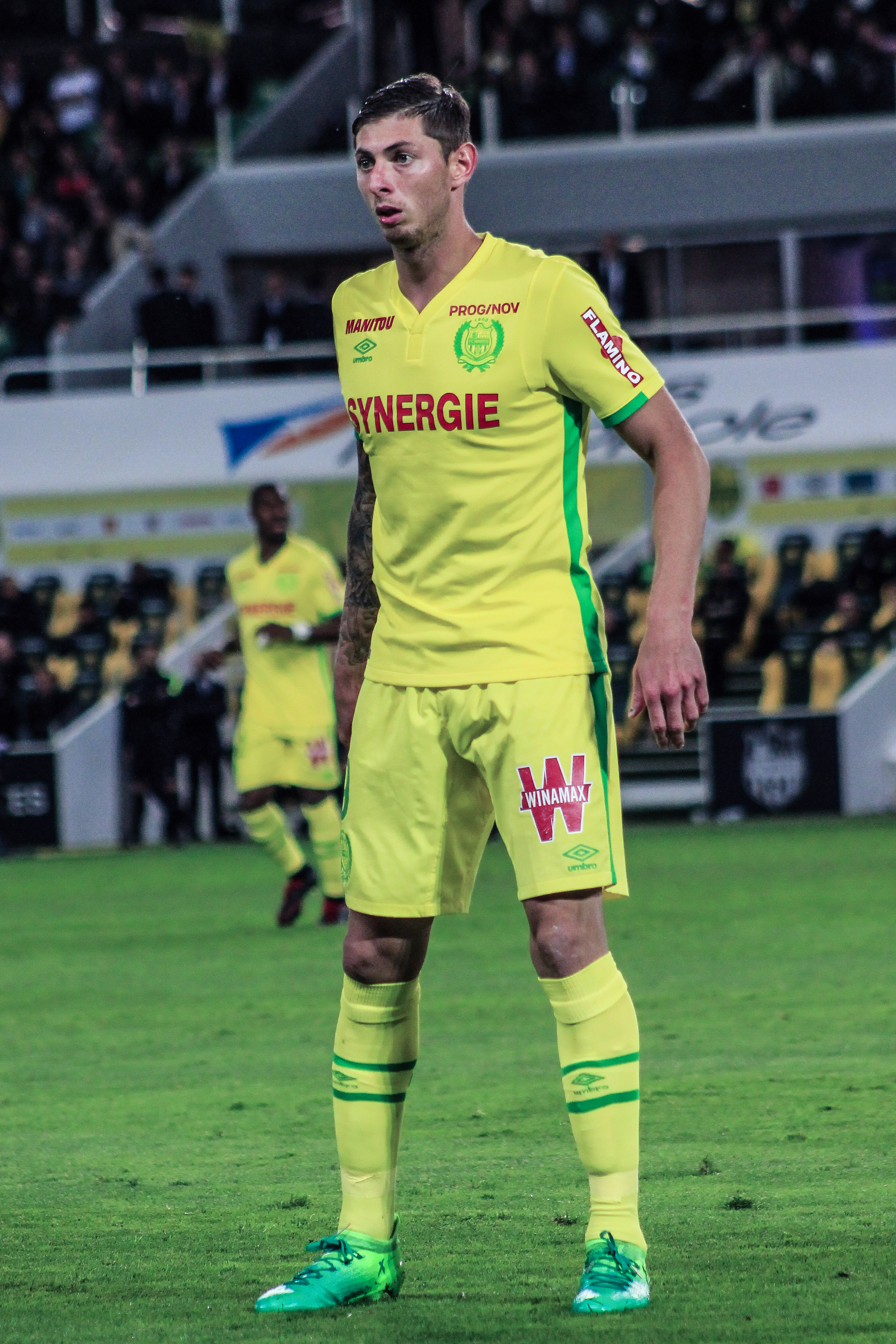
Emiliano Sala during his time with FC Nantes.

The association football transfer of Emiliano Sala from FC Nantes to Cardiff City F.C. occurred on 19 January 2019. After month-long negotiations between the two clubs, Welsh-based Premier League club Cardiff City agreed to pay French Ligue 1 club Nantes a club record £15 million transfer fee for Emiliano Sala, a 28-year-old Argentine striker. Sala was Cardiff manager Neil Warnock's prime target in the club's attempt to stave off relegation during the 2018–19 season.

However, two days after the transfer was completed, Sala and 59-year-old pilot David Ibbotson travelled via a private plane that disappeared over the English Channel, and an official search operation for the pair and the aircraft began immediately. The search was quickly called off, as the chances of Sala or Ibbotson surviving were deemed to be extremely remote. On 7 February, after a new search had begun, Sala's body was recovered from the wreckage of the plane, but Ibbotson's body was never recovered. It later emerged that Ibbotson was unlicensed, as well as unqualified to fly at night, and that both had been exposed to high levels of carbon monoxide during the flight.

A bitter legal dispute involving the two clubs began before Sala's body had been recovered, with Nantes demanding the first of three payments for the player. Cardiff refused to make the payment, claiming Sala was not legally their player. Nantes reported Cardiff to Fédération Internationale de Football Association (FIFA), who ruled in favour of Nantes after an investigation, leading Cardiff to begin a protracted legal process with the Court of Arbitration for Sport (CAS). Cardiff received a ban from buying any new players for three transfer windows, also subject to an ongoing legal appeal. The CAS hearing took place in March 2022, and in August, CAS found Cardiff liable for payment as the transfer had been completed at the time of Sala's death.

In 2020, Cardiff filed papers citing wrongdoing by Nantes, an unnamed individual believed to be Nantes chairman Waldemar Kita, and agents Willie McKay and his son Mark McKay, and in 2021 accused the club of forging an antedated cheque. Though no longer a licensed agent, the elder McKay had played a central role in the transfer, including arranging meetings between the involved parties and generating fake interest in the player, and was responsible for arranging the fatal flight. He was given an official police warning for his conduct towards Cardiff members of staff in the aftermath of the transfer.

== Background ==
Emiliano Sala, an Argentine striker, signed for French Ligue 1 side Nantes from Derby de l'Atlantique rivals Girondins de Bordeaux on 20 July 2015, signing a five-year contract for a fee of £600k (€1m). At the time of his move to Welsh-based Premier League club Cardiff City, he was 28 years old and was the top goalscorer for Nantes during his final season at the club, having scored 13 goals in 21 appearances, and was fifth top goalscorer in Ligue 1 that season. Sala had nearly been loaned out to Turkish Süper Lig club Galatasaray in the summer, as he was not deemed to be in the plans of manager Miguel Cardoso. Earlier in 2018, English team Brighton & Hove Albion had a bid accepted by Nantes in excess of €10m, before Sala rejected the opportunity, and he also turned down a move to Chinese Super League club Beijing Renhe the following month.

At the time Cardiff established their interest in buying Sala in December 2018, they had recently been promoted from the EFL Championship, but were struggling to score goals in the Premier League, with their top goalscorer of the season to that point being makeshift centre forward Callum Paterson with four goals; the situation led Cardiff manager Neil Warnock to attend a Nantes game against Marseille in December to personally scout Sala, who would score his final ever goal in the game. Sala's contract with Nantes ran a further 18 months to June 2020, and it was believed that the club's initial asking price of £25m could be reduced to £15m, with Warnock's personal visit to France making Cardiff the most likely destination amid interest from other Premier League clubs.

== Transfer ==
Avatar of Emiliano Sala

Emiliano Sala
(@emilianosala1)
tweeted:

La ultima ❤️ ciao @FCNantes 👋🏻💛💚

21 January 2019

In December 2018, Cardiff agreed a club-record transfer fee of £15 million (€20 million) with Nantes for Sala, but later in the month Warnock announced there was doubt as to whether the deal would commence, as Nantes had changed their asking price, saying he and Cardiff would not be "held to ransom", while Cardiff chairman Mehmet Dalman admitted that their pursuit for Sala was "not going well". On 27 December, Nantes officially rejected Cardiff's offer, and it appeared increasingly unlikely the transfer would proceed as Sala reportedly favoured a move to a team participating in European competition, rather than a team battling relegation. Nantes manager Vahid Halilhodžić repeatedly express his desire for Sala to remain at the club. French newspaper L'Equipe reported that negotiations to sell Sala were being secretly undertaken with Cardiff by Nantes chairman Waldemar Kita, against the wishes of Halilhodžić, and without Sala's knowledge or involvement.

Sala remained a target for Cardiff, and Warnock again travelled to France to watch Sala in action, while on 12 January Dalman revealed the deal was "not dead", asking for fans to be patient. In 2021, Dalman would claim that Warnock had gone against the wishes of the board, who had refused to sanction the cost of the transfer, and gained direct permission from Cardiff owner Vincent Tan. At the behest of Kita, Sala travelled to Cardiff on 14 January with his agent Meissa N'Diaye for a meeting with Warnock and chief executive Ken Choo, described as "constructive" by Mark McKay, Nantes' acting representative in the transfer talks. With the deal close to being completed, Sala was reported to have withdrawn from the Nantes squad scheduled to play Nîmes Olympique on 16 January, but later that evening Sala was named by Nantes as a substitute.

On the morning of 18 January, Sala flew back to Cardiff to conduct a medical ahead of the transfer. which was announced to have been completed later that day. Sala rejected a "huge" offer from an undisclosed Chinese club, and the signing was completed the next day, with Sala signing a three-and-a-half-year contract, but was finalised too late for him to be able to appear in a Premier League fixture against Newcastle United the following day. Sala remained in Cardiff to complete press duties, and was officially unveiled as a Cardiff player at 7pm on 19 January following a 3–0 defeat to Newcastle, with the announcement rushed through to mitigate against fan reaction due to the loss. Cardiff promoted the transfer via social media and released a statement via the club's website titled "Sala is a Bluebird"; Sports website The Athletic reported in August 2019 that this unveiling was premature, as the Premier League had rejected the payment schedule proposed by the two clubs, with a deadline for a renewed contract set for 22 January.

With the public announcement of the transfer made, Sala's first game was now believed to be scheduled to be against Arsenal on 22 January, before flying back to Nantes to collect his personal belongings and say goodbye to his Nantes teammates. Speaking to Cardiff City's website, Sala described being the club's new record signing as "special". At an inquest into his death in 2022, Sala's mother Mercedes Taffarel said that he had felt pressure from both clubs to complete the transfer, describing the duration of the negotiations as "very intense" in a written statement.

=== Involvement of Willie McKay ===
Former football agent Willie McKay played a central role in the transfer, despite not being a licensed intermediary since being declared bankrupt in 2015, and was one of five agents and intermediaries who were due to receive payment as part of the transfer; in addition to Willie and son Mark McKay, as well as Sala's agent N'Diaye, Matthew Syed of British newspaper The Times reported that French agents Baba Dramé and Bakari Sanogo were also to gain financially from the transfer, with Willie saying the cut was 10% of the transfer fee. In an e-mail leaked to the media soon after the transfer, it was shown that McKay had written to Sala for the first time on 6 January to inform him of his role in the transfer and the arrangements he could make, while also informing Sala that he had generated fake interest from Premier League clubs West Ham United and Everton in order to raise the asking price, and therefore generate more money for all of the involved parties. As a result of these revelations, Cardiff would write letters to the clubs mentioned, as well as Crystal Palace, seeking to clarify if they had ever been interested in transferring Sala. The Daily Telegraph reported that McKay was most likely the source of a November newspaper story additionally linking Sala to Leicester City and Fulham.

British broadcaster Sky Sports revealed that the extent of McKay's involvement dated back to Warnock's original scouting trip to France, with McKay arranging all subsequent trips involving Cardiff and Nantes representatives, while McKay himself confirmed to the media he had also arranged and paid for the flight which led to Sala and Ibbotson's deaths, claiming Sala had been "abandoned in a hotel" and left to arrange his own travel, but denied choosing the pilot or the plane, as did his son Mark. Cardiff chairman Mehmet Dalman said that Sala had turned down Cardiff's travel arrangements, choosing instead to make his own arrangements to arrive in Cardiff quicker, with text messages released showing that Sala had liaised with Willie's son Jack McKay regarding the travel arrangements. The BBC reported that McKay and his sons had organised all the flights pertaining to the transfer, including those for Warnock and his assistant Kevin Blackwell during initial scouting trips, as well as for flights regarding transfer negotiations which involved Sala, N'Diaye and the McKays flying to and from Nantes. McKay admitted he was "overjoyed" to help arrange flights for Sala.

McKay also accused Cardiff first of trying to throw him under the bus after Sala's death, and later of trying to make him a scapegoat. Dalman criticised McKay for his role in the transfer, describing his behaviour as "shoddy", and saying there was a wild west mentality amongst agents, while manager Neil Warnock denied claims he had signed Sala because of an alleged friendship with McKay, saying similar arrangements were needed with agents to sign players from France. During a 2021 trial, plane operator David Henderson, who helped to arrange the fatal flight, told Cardiff Crown Court that McKay was "very insistent" on the flight going ahead at the earliest opportunity, and during a 2022 inquest, McKay denied any knowledge pertaining to illegalities of Henderson's operations, but confirmed he had used Henderson's services for 14 years and had only contacted him upon learning Cardiff had not arranged the flight.

South Wales Police received a complaint from Cardiff in early March, alleging McKay had threatened to "burn Cardiff" and "kill everybody" at the club, as well as confronting members of staff both in person and via telephone, and threatening violence against Choo and player-liaison officer Callum Davies; McKay confirmed to French sports newspaper L'Equipe that he had had an altercation with the pair. Lawyers acting on behalf of the club sent a letter to McKay's lawyers requesting he desist, and additionally banned him from the Cardiff City Stadium. On 21 March, Metropolitan Police were also investigating McKay over similar offences. At the conclusion of the investigation, McKay was issued with a first instance harassment warning, though police confirmed he had not been arrested as part of the investigation.

== Aftermath: legal disputes and court cases ==
=== Nantes ask Cardiff for payment ===
On 26 January, Cardiff announced that they had frozen all transfer payments pending investigation, and soon after, Sala's former club Bordeaux issued a statement denying reports from French newspaper Presse-Océan that they had demanded payment which they were due as part of a sell-on clause. On 6 February, it was reported that Nantes had sent letters to Cardiff threatening legal action if the first payment, believed to be £5.27m (€6m), was not made within 10 working days. Cardiff told the media that the timing was "wrong", and would only make any payment once a full investigation into the crash had been completed. Questions which Cardiff wanted answers to included the reasoning behind Sala travelling in a private plane when the club had offered a commercial flight, and the involvement of agent Willie McKay. Writing for British newspaper The Guardian, journalist Daniel Taylor was critical of the behaviour of both clubs in the immediate aftermath, describing the row over money as a "lack of sensitivity", while Daniel Ribero, president of Sala's former club San Martin, described the dispute as "cold" and "distasteful".

On 12 February, Cardiff chairman Mehmet Dalman said the club were still gathering information as to whether a payment would be made and if they were "contractually obliged" to do so. With the payment still not made by 19 February, Nantes were preparing to take the issue to Fédération Internationale de Football Association (FIFA), the international governing body of the sport, but the following day the two clubs agreed an extension of a week for the first payment. Cardiff were looking into whether an insurance claim of £16m would still be paid out, as any wrongdoing on their part with regards to Sala's flight would annul any policy; Cardiff had insured Sala for £16m with Lloyd's of London, with the policy led by China Re and brokered by Miller Insurance Services. Manager Neil Warnock said that he was confident Cardiff were doing things "in the right way", and acknowledged that attempts to buy further players had been set back after Sala's disappearance, but admitted he had considered retirement from the sport. Warnock and Cardiff's squad were described as feeling "absolutely terrible", and a mid-season trip to Tenerife was cancelled.

"It is really complicated and I feel very strongly about it. 'Why don't we just pay the money?' The answer to that is it's £15m. If we don't have to pay, why should we? There is a lot more to this than perhaps people sometimes realise, things that still need to come out. As chairman, I'm the guardian of this football club and I have to do what's right for us. Do you know, even if we had £15m to spare, were willing to throw money away, my decision would not be any different. There are certain principles we have to act upon."

— Cardiff City chairman Mehmet Dalman on the reason for the dispute.

With the extended deadline for the payment passed, Nantes officially reported Cardiff to FIFA regarding the non-payment on 27 February, a claim which FIFA confirmed they were investigating in a statement to ESPN. Cardiff maintained their stance that all facts regarding the event should be determined before progressing, and the following month Cardiff told FIFA the agreement to sign Sala was not legally binding, contending they had not agreed personal terms with Sala as the Premier League had ruled Sala's demand for his signing-on fee to be paid 100% up front was invalid, and at the time of his death no renegotiations had taken place to make the payments over the course of his contract. Cardiff had also reportedly agreed to a proposal by Nantes to include a clause in the transfer agreement, which stipulated that both the Football Association of Wales (FAW) and France's Ligue de Football Professionnel had to confirm to both clubs that Sala was registered with his new club, and that the player's International Transfer Certificate has been released, which Nantes said had been confirmed on 21 January at 5.30pm. The Times reported that this error could cause a failure to pay Sala's family a £600k "death-in-service" payment. According to The Daily Telegraph, Cardiff also accused Nantes of failing to report Mark McKay's involvement to the FIFA Transfer Matching System.

At the beginning of April, FIFA extended the deadline a further two weeks, after Cardiff had written to Nantes to request a meeting to settle the matter directly, but had received no response. On the new deadline of 15 April, Cardiff submitted their evidence of the case to FIFA, which left Nantes until the end of May to decide whether to take the case forward. The files of evidence received the nickname of "The Onion" by Cardiff's lawyers, a "toxic" detail which Barney Ronay of The Guardian explained was due to there being "so much information here, so many interested parties, so many layers... the more you peel it, the more it stinks". Consequently, the transfer was not included in a full list of transactions involving agents published by The Football Association.

=== FIFA judgment and Cardiff fight back ===
The parties returned to court on 25 September, and on 30 September FIFA ruled in favour of Nantes and demanded that Cardiff must pay the first instalment, with both clubs given 10 days to lodge an appeal. The granting of the International Transfer Certificate by FAW was the key reason FIFA had ruled in Nantes favour. Cardiff quickly announced their intent to appeal to Court of Arbitration for Sport (CAS), stating that there was "clear evidence that the transfer agreement was never completed". Speaking to British sports radio station Talksport, Dalman explained the decision behind the intent to appeal, saying that there needed to be a verdict "which considers all of the relevant contractual information and provides clarity on the full legal situation between our two clubs", adding that "there is a lot more evidence and a lot more facts that need to be brought out to make an informed decision".

FIFA's involvement was concluded on 4 November, when they ordered Cardiff to pay Nantes the first instalment within 45 days or face a transfer ban of three consecutive windows. Cardiff appealed the decision to CAS, saying that FIFA had reached their decision based only on a "narrow aspect of the overall dispute". CAS confirmed the appeals process had begun a month later, announcing it would take place in spring 2020, but was delayed first in May 2020 and again in August, with no fixed hearing date set.

On 28 January 2020, it was revealed that Cardiff, through French law firm Dupond-Moretti Vey, had sent files to French prosecutors as part of a lawsuit against Nantes, and an unnamed individual believed to be chairman Waldemar Kita, saying that "sufficient evidence of wrongdoing" had been found, reiterating their commitment to establishing the full facts of the situation before paying any part of the transfer fee. In the lawsuit, lawyer Antoine Vey alleged "the existence of hidden commissions and sub-commissions". Nantes released a statement in response to the allegations, accusing Cardiff of exploiting Sala's death.

In July, the McKays were accused of having an illegal double mandate in the transfer; firstly from Nantes to sell Sala, and secondly from West Ham United to purchase the player. In February 2021, Vey filed a secondary case on behalf of Cardiff against Nantes, regarding an alleged backdated cheque; a cheque dated the same day of Sala and Ibbotson's disappearance was sent to Sala's mother Mercedes Taffarel, with Cardiff believing this amounted to "falsification of a cheque" and "attempted fraud", as it was inconceivable the cheque would have been sent to his mother before his disappearance and ultimate death had even occurred. In August 2021, agent Baba Dramé disclosed to L'Equipe that he had been questioned by police for one hour regarding his role in the transfer, but ultimately faced no charges for "illegal acts as a sporting agent" and "illegal use of aerial transport".

=== CAS hearing ===
Due in part to the COVID-19 pandemic and undisclosed "technical reasons", both clubs agreed on multiple occasions to extend deadlines for filing their submissions ahead of a hearing with CAS. In October 2021, L'Equipe reported that CAS hearing in litigation between the two clubs had finally been set for March 2022. The hearing was closed from all third-party access, and CAS confirmed to news agency PA Media that the arbitration panel would only issue their decision "at a later date". The three-man panel was headed by Ulrich Haas, a German professor of law, and the hearing lasted two days. According to the newspaper South Wales Echo, Cardiff's case rested on two key components; whether the transfer fee was due, and were Nantes liable for Sala's death. In April, Cardiff "wholly dismissed as false" reports of the club making a compensation claim of £80m against Nantes for loss of revenue concerning television rights, advertising and sponsorships deals following the club's relegation from the Premier League in 2019, the claim was alleged to have been made by Cardiff during the hearings.

In August 2022, CAS announced that they had dismissed Cardiff's appeal, stating that the transfer had been completed at the time of Sala's death, and that Nantes' request for payment was upheld. Cardiff responded with a statement which said no payments would be made until further appeals had been completed, and that if the appeals failed the club would take legal action against "those responsible for the crash" to recuperate the money. Appearing on the BBC's Transfer podcast released following the conclusion of the CAS hearing, journalist David Conn described the row between the two clubs as "a stain on football's image, reputation and honour".

Having failed to pay the first scheduled instalment of £5.3 million after receiving the invoice from Nantes, Cardiff were automatically placed under a transfer embargo by the English Football League (EFL), though club chairman Mehmet Dalman told BBC Radio that the club were in talks with the EFL and FIFA to overturn the ban, and reiterated that the club had no intention of paying any instalment. During a meeting with Dalman, supporters' groups of the club were supportive of the continued course of action Cardiff were taking, accepting the arguments put forth by club executives. However, on 10 January 2023, almost four years after the transfer took place, Cardiff made a payment of £7m to Nantes, which amounted to the first instalment plus interest. which resulted in the EFL transfer embargo being lifted, though only allowed the club to sign players on free transfers or loan them from another club, preventions which would be in place until May 2024. Accounts posted at Companies House in March 2023 showed Cardiff had still set aside more than £20m as part of the transfer.

On 30 June, Cardiff were ordered by FIFA to pay Nantes the second and third instalments for the transfer fee, a reported sum of £9.45m; the two instalments were announced as being paid on 18 July.

=== Cardiff sue insurance broker ===
In December 2022, Cardiff sued insurance brokers Miller Insurance Services for more than £10m for the "failure to act with the reasonable skill and care expected of an insurance broker". Papers filed in the High Court in January 2023 showed that Cardiff tried to insure Sala for £20m the day following his disappearance, which lawyers for Miller Insurance counteracted by saying that Cardiff were aware of the lack of cover for Sala, and that it was not the responsibility of the firm to chase the club to ensure players were covered immediately. Cardiff denied this in a statement released to the media afterwards, saying that the club were of the belief that "all players were insured from the moment they were signed, and the case arises from learning they were not".
