= Michael Norton =

Michael Norton may refer to:

- Michael Norton (politician) (1837–1889), American politician from New York
- Michael Norton (professor) (born 1975), professor of business administration at Harvard Business School
- Michael Norton (skier) (1964–1996), Australian Paralympic alpine skier
- Michael J. Norton, American attorney
- Mike Norton, American comic book artist and writer
