= Mary Norton =

Mary Norton may refer to:

- Andre Norton (1912–2005), American author; born Alice Mary Norton
- Mary Beth Norton (born 1943), American historian
- Mary D. Herter Norton (1894–1985), American publisher, violinist, and translator; co-founder of W. W. Norton & Company
- Mary E. Norton (1833-1916), American Congregational minister
- Mary Norton (writer) (1903–1992), English author of the series The Borrowers
- Mary Teresa Norton (1875–1959), American congresswoman
