= Ernest Norton =

Ernest Norton may refer to:

- Ernest Norton (cricketer) (1889–1972), English cricketer
- Ernest Norton (RAF officer) (1893–1966), British World War I flying ace
