= William Harrison Norton =

American lawyer and politician

William Harrison Norton (1920 – 2000) was a well-known Missouri lawyer and state representative of Missouri during the 1950s. He was the great-grandson of United States Congressman and Missouri Supreme Court Judge Elijah Hise Norton.

In 1948, Norton was president of the Boone County Young Democratic Club.

He was involved in local political issues in the early 1950s.

Elected in 1954, Norton served as a member of the Missouri State House of Representatives from Clay County for two years.

He proposed a repeal of non-partisan judicial appointments, but his bill was defeated in the House.

== See also ==
- 1954 United States elections
