= Bill Norton =

American football player (born 2000)

No. 93 – Los Angeles Rams
- Position: Defensive end
- Roster status: Practice squad

Personal information
- Born: July 7, 2000 (age 26); Memphis, Tennessee, U.S.
- Listed height: 6 ft 6 in (1.98 m)
- Listed weight: 336 lb (152 kg)

Career information
- High school: Christian Brothers (Memphis)
- College: Georgia (2019–2022); Arizona (2023); Texas (2024)
- NFL draft: 2025: undrafted

Career history
- Los Angeles Rams (2025–present)*
- * Offseason or practice squad member only

Awards and highlights
- 2× CFP national champion (2021, 2022)
- Stats at Pro Football Reference

Bill Norton (born July 7, 2000) is an American professional football defensive end for the Los Angeles Rams of the National Football League (NFL). He played college football for the Georgia Bulldogs, Arizona Wildcats, and Texas Longhorns.

== Early life ==
Norton attended Christian Brothers High School in Memphis, Tennessee. As a junior, he recorded 45 tackles with 16 being for a loss, and seven sacks. As a senior, Norton notched 65 tackles with 12 being for a loss, and six sacks, and was named the DII-AAA Mr. Football award winner. Coming out of high school, he was rated as a four-star recruit and committed to play college football for the Georgia Bulldogs over offers from schools such as Alabama, LSU, Mississippi State, Ohio State, Notre Dame, Penn State, Oklahoma, Ole Miss, and Tennessee.

== College career ==
=== Georgia ===
During his time with the Bulldogs from 2019 through 2022, Norton recorded 12 tackles, while utilizing a redshirt season, and helping the team to two national championships. After the 2022 season, he entered his name into the NCAA transfer portal.

=== Arizona ===
Norton transferred to play for the Arizona Wildcats. In 2023, he recorded 32 tackles with two and a half going for a loss, three pass deflections, and two forced fumbles in 13 games. After the season, Norton once again entered his name into the NCAA transfer portal.

=== Texas ===
Norton transferred to play for the Texas Longhorns. In 2024, he recorded 14 tackles with two being for a loss, a sack, and a forced fumble in 15 games. After the season, Norton declared for the 2025 NFL draft.

=== College statistics ===
Year	Team	GP	Tackles					Interceptions					Fumbles			
Year	Team	GP	Solo	Ast	Cmb	TfL	Sck	Int	Yds	Avg	TD	PD	FR	Yds	TD	FF
2019	Georgia	3	2	2	4	1	0.0	0	0	0.0	0	0	0	0	0	0
2020	Georgia	4	0	1	1	1	0.0	0	0	0.0	0	0	0	0	0	0
2021	Georgia	7	0	5	5	1	0.0	0	0	0.0	0	0	0	0	0	0
2022	Georgia	13	3	0	3	1	0.0	0	0	0.0	0	0	0	0	0	0
2023	Arizona	13	14	18	32	3	0.0	0	0	0.0	0	3	0	0	0	2
2024	Texas	15	6	8	14	2	1.0	0	0	0.0	0	0	0	0	0	1
Career		55	25	34	59	9	1.0	0	0	0.0	0	3	0	0	0	3

== Professional career ==
Pre-draft measurables
Height	Weight	Arm length	Hand span	Wingspan	40-yard dash	10-yard split	20-yard split	20-yard shuttle	Three-cone drill	Vertical jump	Broad jump	Bench press
6 ft 5 in (1.96 m)	325 lb (147 kg)	32 1/4 in (0.82 m)	9 5/8 in (0.24 m)	6 ft 3 5/8 in (1.92 m)	5.39 s	1.95 s	3.08 s	5.13 s	8.10 s	22.0 in (0.56 m)	7 ft 9 in (2.36 m)	25 reps
All values from Pro Day

After not being selected in the 2025 NFL draft, Norton signed with the Los Angeles Rams as an undrafted free agent. He was waived on August 26. The next day, Norton was re-signed to the practice squad. On January 27, 2026, he signed a reserve/futures contract with Los Angeles.

On August 30, 2026, Norton was waived by the Rams as a part of final roster cuts; he was re-signed to the team's practice squad the following day.

== Personal life ==
On August 25, 2019, Norton was arrested on a DUI charge under the age of 21.
