= Heather Norton =

British judge

The Honourable Ms Justice Norton
- Royal coat of arms of the United Kingdom

Justice of the High Court
- Incumbent
- Assumed office 6 October 2025
- Appointed by: Charles III

Personal details
- Born: 24 November 1966 (age 59)

Dame Heather Sophia Norton (born 24 November 1966) is a British judge who is a justice of the High Court.

== Biography ==
Norton grew up in Southern England and attended local state schools until she won a music scholarship to an independent school for sixth form. She was the first in her family to attend university. She was called to the Bar in 1988. She practised at 23ES Chambers and QEB Hollis Whiteman for 23 years. She served as a Circuit Judge at the Crown Court at Canterbury, and later at Reading, becoming its Resident (lead) judge. Norton was a Chair of the Competition Appeals Tribunal. In 2024, she announced the refurbishment of Reading Crown Court. As a judge she dealt with high profile trials including the murder of Olly Stephens, the murder of Charlotte Huggins, and the murder of Cameron Bailey. She was appointed to the High Court in 2025.

Norton will take up the role of Presiding Judge for the South Eastern Circuit effective 1 January 2027.

== See also ==
- List of High Court judges of England and Wales
- List of dames commander of the Order of the British Empire
