= Elijah Hise Norton =

American judge

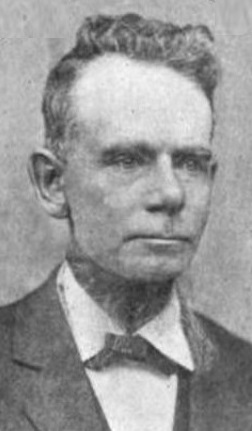
- From the April 1891 issue of The Green Bag magazine

Member of the U.S. House of Representatives from Missouri's 4th district
- In office March 4, 1861 – March 3, 1863
- Preceded by: James Craig
- Succeeded by: Sempronius H. Boyd

Personal details
- Born: November 21, 1821 Russellville, Kentucky
- Died: August 6, 1914 (aged 92) Platte City, Missouri
- Party: Democratic
- Profession: lawyer

Elijah Hise Norton (November 21, 1821 – August 6, 1914) was a U.S. congressman from Missouri during the United States Civil War.

== Biography ==
He was born in Russellville, Logan County, Kentucky, November 21, 1821 and attended the public schools and Centre College, Danville, Kentucky He graduated from the law department of Transylvania University, Lexington, Kentucky, in 1842 and was admitted to the bar and commenced practice in Platte City, Missouri, in 1845. He served as county attorney in 1850 and judge of the circuit court of Missouri 1852–1860.

Prior to the United States Civil War, Elijah served as an outspoken voice against Missouri's secession from the Union. He was a member of the Missouri Constitutional Convention of 1861, where he voted against secession. He was elected as a Democrat to the Thirty-seventh Congress (March 4, 1861 – March 3, 1863), where, despite his opposition to his state's secession, he opposed waging war against the Confederacy to preserve the Union, believing that "it would be better for all concerned to let the seceding states depart in peace" He was an unsuccessful candidate for reelection in 1862 to the Thirty-eighth Congress.

He was a delegate to the state constitutional convention in 1875, and was one of the primary authors of the Missouri Constitution of 1875. The Missouri Constitution of 1875 sometimes was informally called "Norton's Constitution" due to his major influence over its content and his knowledge of constitutional law. Elijah was subsequently appointed and then elected as judge of the Supreme Court of Missouri, serving from 1877 to 1888.

After his judicial term was over, he was urged to run for Missouri governor and for United States Senator from Missouri, but he declined. He then resumed the private practice of law and the care of his estate and died in Platte City, August 6, 1914. His interment was in Platte City Cemetery. He was a devout Baptist, and at the time of his death was the oldest living Freemason in the United States.

William Harrison Norton was his great-grandson. His great-great-great-grandson Elijah Norton is the Republican nominee for State Treasurer of Arizona in 2026.

U.S. House of Representatives
Preceded by James Craig	Member of the U.S. House of Representatives from Missouri's 4th congressional district 1861–1863	Succeeded by Sempronius H. Boyd
Political offices
Preceded by David Wagner	Justice of the Missouri Supreme Court; 1877–1888	Succeeded by Shepard Barclay
