= William South Norton =

English cricketer

William South Norton (8 June 1831 – 19 March 1916) was an English cricketer active from 1849 to 1870 who played for Kent and was the club captain for many years. He was born in Town Malling and died in London Charterhouse. He appeared in 87 first-class matches as a righthanded batsman who bowled right arm medium pace with a roundarm action. He scored 2,010 runs with a highest score of 120* and held 63 catches. He took 84 wickets with a best analysis of seven for 57.

== Bibliography ==
- Carlaw, Derek (2020). Kent County Cricketers, A to Z: Part One (1806–1914) (PDF). Cardiff: ACS.
