= 2014 IFK Göteborg season =

IFK Göteborg
2014 season
- Chairman: Karl Jartun
- Head coach: Mikael Stahre
- Stadium: Gamla Ullevi
- Allsvenskan: 2nd
- 2013–14 Svenska Cupen: Quarter-finals
- 2014–15 UEFA Europa League: Third qualifying round
- Top goalscorer: League: Lasse Vibe (23); All: Lasse Vibe (29)
- Highest home attendance: 17,073 vs. Malmö FF (7 April 2014, Allsvenskan)
- Lowest home attendance: 2,614 vs. IFK Värnamo (1 March 2014, Svenska Cupen); Allsvenskan: 6,382 vs. IF Brommapojkarna (17 August 2014)
- Average home league attendance: 10,739
Home colours	Away colours

The 2014 season was IFK Göteborg's 109th in existence, their 82nd season in Allsvenskan and their 38th consecutive season in the league. They competed in Allsvenskan where they finished second, Svenska Cupen where they were knocked out in the quarter-finals and the UEFA Europa League where they were knocked out in the third qualifying round. IFK Göteborg also participated in one competition in which the club continued playing in for the 2015 season, 2014–15 Svenska Cupen. The season began with the group stage of Svenska Cupen on 1 March, league play started on 30 March and lasted until 1 November. A new captain was announced since former captain Tobias Hysén left the squad. Vice captain Mattias Bjärsmyr took over the captaincy.

== Summary ==
=== Svenska Cupen ===
IFK Göteborg qualified for the group stage of the 2013–14 Svenska Cupen in the 2013 season by beating Lunds BK 4–0 on 22 August 2013. The club was seeded second in the group stage draw after finishing second in the 2013 Allsvenskan. The groups were drawn on 13 November 2013 and IFK Göteborg were drawn against Superettan teams GIF Sundsvall and IFK Värnamo and Division 2 team Hudiksvalls FF. The group stage is being played between 1 and 15 March 2014 before the start of the league season.

The first match was a home fixture against IFK Värnamo at Valhalla IP on 1 March 2014, IFK Göteborg won the match 2–0. The second match was an away fixture against Hudiksvalls FF on 8 March 2014, IFK Göteborg won the match 10–0 after five goals by Robin Söder. The win is together with the club's 10–0 victory against Karlskrona BK in 1941 and 11–1 victory against Åsebro IF in 1997 the biggest victory in Svenska Cupen for IFK Göteborg.

The third and final match was a home fixture against GIF Sundsvall on 15 March 2014 at Ullevi which IFK Göteborg won 4–2. IFK Göteborg won the group and advanced to the quarter-finals where they faced Superettan club IK Sirius. The quarter-finals were drawn on 17 March 2014, the club was seeded in the draw after finishing as one of the four best group winners. The quarter-final was played at home on 23 March 2014, IFK Göteborg lost the match 1–0 and was knocked out.

The draw for the second round of the 2014–15 Svenska Cupen was made on 7 August. IFK Göteborg faced Division 3 side Assyriska Turabdin IK. The match was played away in Jönköping on 20 August and IFK Göteborg won 5–0 and progressed to the group stage to be held in March 2015.

=== UEFA Europa League ===
IFK Göteborg qualified for the 2014–15 UEFA Europa League by merit of finishing third in the 2013 Allsvenskan. The club entered the competition in the first round of qualification. The draw for the first and second qualifying rounds was held on 23 June, IFK Göteborg was seeded in both rounds in the draw. The club was drawn against the 2013–14 Luxembourgian runners-up Fola Esch in the first qualifying round. This was the fifth time that IFK Göteborg faced Luxembourgian opposition in European competition, and the first time since 2005. The first leg of the fixture was played at home on 3 July and ended in a 0–0 draw after a game of few chances from either side. The away fixture at Stade Josy Barthel in Luxembourg City was played on 10 July and ended with a 2–0 win for IFK Göteborg, thus taking them through to the second qualifying round with 2–0 on aggregate.

IFK Göteborg faced 2013–14 Hungarian runners-up Győri in the second qualifying round. The first leg was played at the ETO Park in Győr on 17 July and ended in a 3–0 victory for IFK Göteborg. The second leg was played on 24 July at home and ended with a 1–0 defeat for IFK Göteborg. The tie ended in a 3–1 win with IFK Göteborg advancing to the third qualifying round. This was the third time IFK Göteborg face a club from the Hungary in European competition and the first time since 2005.

IFK Göteborg faced 2013–14 Portuguese cup runners-up Rio Ave in the third qualifying round, IFK Göteborg were unseeded in the draw held on 18 July. The first leg was played at home on 31 July and ended in a 1–0 defeat for IFK Göteborg. The second leg was played on 7 August at Estádio do Rio Ave in Vila do Conde and ended with a 0–0 draw, which confirmed the aggregate score to 1–0 in favour of Rio Ave. This was the second time IFK Göteborg face a club from the Portugal in European competition and the first time since 1996.

== Key events ==
- 21 October 2013: Forward Hannes Stiller leaves the club. On 28 November he joined Superettan club Ljungskile SK.
- 28 October 2013: Defender Kjetil Wæhler signs a new one-year contract, keeping him at the club until the end of the season.
- 31 October 2013: Midfielder Martin Smedberg-Dalence joins the club on a four-year contract, transferring from IFK Norrköping.
- 8 November 2013: Midfielder Pontus Farnerud leaves the club and retires.
- 12 November 2013: Forward Sebastian Ohlsson leaves the club. On 12 December he joined Division 1 club and rival Örgryte IS.
- 14 November 2013: Chairman Bertil Rignäs announces his resignation from the club.
- 15 November 2013: Defender Logi Valgarðsson leaves the club, transferring to Sogndal IL.
- 27 November 2013: Defender Erik Lund signs a new three-months contract, keeping him at the club until 31 March.
- 4 December 2013: Midfielder Hampus Zackrisson is promoted to the first-team squad, signing a half-year contract to keep him at the club until 30 June.
- 26 December 2013: Forward Pär Ericsson leaves the club, transferring to Mons.
- 31 December 2013: Defender Mikael Dyrestam leaves the club. On 25 March he joined Aalesunds FK.
- 3 January 2014: Forward and captain Tobias Hysén leaves the club, transferring to Shanghai Dongya.
- 13 January 2014: Defender Mattias Bjärsmyr is chosen as the club's new captain.
- 16 February 2014: Forward Hannes Stiller is selected as 2013 Archangel of the Year, an annual price given by the Supporterklubben Änglarna to a player who has shown a great loyalty to IFK Göteborg.
- 17 February 2014: Director of sports Håkan Mild announces his resignation from the club.
- 25 February 2014: Forward Gustav Engvall is promoted to the first-team squad, signing a four-year contract to keep him at the club until the end of the 2017 season.
- 4 March 2014: Midfielder May Mahlangu joins the club on a one-year contract, transferring from Helsingborgs IF.
- 6 March 2014: Karl Jartun is selected as new chairman at the annual meeting.
- 8 March 2014: IFK Göteborg beats Division 2 team Hudiksvalls FF with 10–0 in Svenska Cupen which tangent the biggest win in Svenska Cupen for the club.
- 12 March 2014: Forward Malick Mané joins the club on a four-year contract, transferring from Sogndal IL.
- 13 March 2014: Head coach Mikael Stahre and assistant coach Magnus Edlund signs a new one-year contract, keeping them at the club until the end of the 2015 season.
- 23 March 2014: Midfielder Gustav Svensson joins the club on a four-year contract, transferring from Tavriya Simferopol.
- 24 March 2014: Defender Erik Lund leaves the club, transferring to Varbergs BoIS.
- 26 March 2014: The club announces the appointment of Mats Gren as the new director of sports.
- 27 March 2014: Midfielder Nordin Gerzić leaves the club on loan to Örebro SK until 1 August 2014.
- 28 March 2014: Defender Jonathan Azulay leaves the club on loan to Östersunds FK until 15 July 2014.
- 6 June 2014: Midfielder Hampus Zackrisson signs a new half-year contract, keeping him at the club until the end of the season.
- 30 June 2014: Defender Patrick Dyrestam is promoted to the first-team squad, signing a three-and-a-half-year contract to keep him at the club until the end of the 2017 season.
- 2 July 2014: Defender Jonathan Azulay extends his loan agreement with Östersunds FK so it covers the rest of the season.
- 7 July 2014: Midfielder Nordin Gerzić extends his loan agreement with Örebro SK so it covers the rest of the season.
- 15 July 2014: Midfielder Darijan Bojanić leaves the club, transferring to Helsingborgs IF.
- 23 July 2014: Forward Malick Mané leaves the club on loan to Central Coast Mariners for the duration of the 2014–15 season.
- 6 August 2014: Goalkeeper Mattias Hugosson joins the club on a half-year contract.
- 9 August 2014: Midfielder Søren Rieks joins the club on a three-and-a-half-year contract, transferring from NEC.
- 11 August 2014: Forward Kenneth Zohore joins the club on a loan contract for the rest of the season, transferring from Fiorentina. Midfielder Daniel Sobralense leaves the club on loan to Örebro SK for the duration of the season. Midfielder Diego Calvo joins the club on a loan contract for the rest of the season, transferring from Vålerenga.
- 13 August 2014: Forward Sam Larsson leaves the club, transferring to Heerenveen.
- 22 August 2014: Forward Robin Söder leaves the club, transferring to Esbjerg fB.
- 30 September 2014: Defender Emil Salomonsson signs a new four-year contract, keeping him at the club until the end of the 2018 season.
- 6 November 2014: Forward Gustav Engvall is selected as Allsvenskan newcomer of the year.

== Players ==
=== Squad ===
Note: Flags indicate national team as defined under FIFA eligibility rules; some limited exceptions apply. Players may hold more than one non-FIFA nationality.

No.	Pos.	Nation	Player
1	GK	SWE	John Alvbåge
2	DF	SWE	Emil Salomonsson
3	MF	SWE	Hampus Zackrisson
4	DF	NOR	Kjetil Wæhler (vice captain)
5	MF	SWE	Philip Haglund
6	DF	SWE	Ludwig Augustinsson
8	MF	SWE	Nordin Gerzić
8	MF	DEN	Søren Rieks
9	MF	BOL	Martin Smedberg-Dalence
10	MF	BRA	Daniel Sobralense
11	FW	SWE	Robin Söder
12	GK	SWE	Marcus Sandberg
13	MF	SWE	Gustav Svensson
14	DF	ISL	Hjálmar Jónsson

No.	Pos.	Nation	Player
15	MF	SWE	Jakob Johansson
16	FW	DEN	Kenneth Zohore (on loan from Fiorentina)
17	FW	SWE	Sam Larsson
18	MF	SWE	Darijan Bojanić
19	FW	SWE	Gustav Engvall
21	FW	SEN	Malick Mané
22	DF	SWE	Adam Johansson
24	MF	CRC	Diego Calvo (on loan from Vålerenga)
25	GK	SWE	Mattias Hugosson
26	MF	RSA	May Mahlangu
27	MF	SWE	Joel Allansson
29	FW	DEN	Lasse Vibe
30	DF	SWE	Mattias Bjärsmyr (captain)
31	DF	SWE	Patrick Dyrestam

==== Youth players with first-team appearances ====
Youth players who played a competitive match for the club in 2014.

Note: Flags indicate national team as defined under FIFA eligibility rules; some limited exceptions apply. Players may hold more than one non-FIFA nationality.

No. / Pos. / Nation / Player; 32 / MF / SWE / Karl Bohm	No. / Pos. / Nation / Player; 33 / DF / SWE / Billy Nordström

=== Players in/out ===
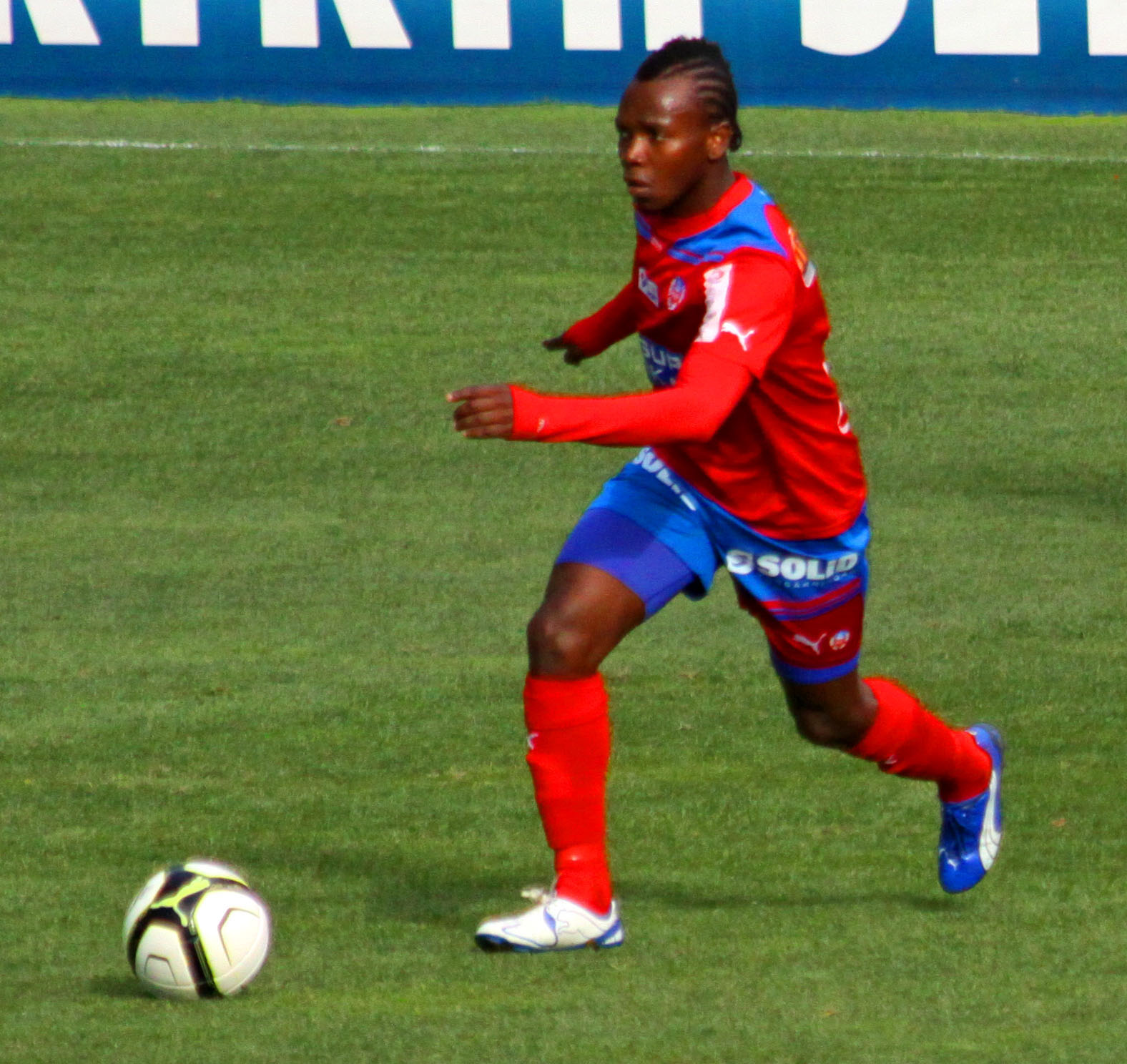
Midfielder May Mahlangu joined IFK Göteborg from Helsingborgs IF. He was selected as Allsvenskan player of the year in 2011.

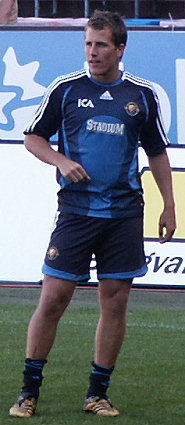
Forward and captain Tobias Hysén left the club for Chinese side Shanghai Dongya after six and a half seasons.

==== In ====
No.	Pos.	Nat.	Name	Age	Moving from	Type	Transfer window	Ends	Transfer fee	Source
9	MF	(Sweden)	Martin Smedberg-Dalence	29	IFK Norrköping	Bosman	Winter	2017	Free	ifkgoteborg.se
3	MF	(Sweden)	Hampus Zackrisson	19	Youth system	Promoted	Winter	2014 (June)	—	ifkgoteborg.se
18	FW	(Sweden)	Pär Ericsson	25	Mjällby AIF	Loan return	Winter	2013	Free	ifkgoteborg.se
13	FW	(Sweden)	Sebastian Ohlsson	20	Örgryte IS	Loan return	Winter	2013	Free	ifkgoteborg.se
20	DF	(Sweden)	Jonathan Azulay	20	Örgryte IS	Loan return	Winter	2014	—	ifkgoteborg.se
8	MF	(Sweden)	Nordin Gerzić	30	Örebro SK	Loan return	Winter	2015	—	ifkgoteborg.se
19	FW	(Sweden)	Gustav Engvall	17	Youth system	Promoted	Winter	2017	—	ifkgoteborg.se
26	MF	(South Africa)	May Mahlangu	24	Helsingborgs IF	Bosman	Winter	2014	Free	ifkgoteborg.se
21	FW	(Senegal)	Malick Mané	25	Sogndal	Transfer	Winter	2017	(~ 5.3M SEK)	ifkgoteborg.se
13	MF	(Sweden)	Gustav Svensson	27	Tavriya Simferopol	Bosman	Winter	2017	Free	ifkgoteborg.se
31	DF	(Sweden)	Patrick Dyrestam	18	Youth system	Promoted	Summer	2017	—	ifkgoteborg.se
25	GK	(Sweden)	Mattias Hugosson	40	Retirement	Bosman	Summer	2014	Free	ifkgoteborg.se
8	MF	(Denmark)	Søren Rieks	27	NEC	Transfer	Summer	2017	(~ 3.7M SEK)	ifkgoteborg.se
16	FW	(Denmark)	Kenneth Zohore	20	Fiorentina	Loan	Summer	2014	—	ifkgoteborg.se
24	MF	(Costa Rica)	Diego Calvo	23	Vålerenga	Loan	Summer	2014	—	ifkgoteborg.se

==== Out ====
No.	Pos.	Nat.	Name	Age	Moving to	Type	Transfer window	Transfer fee	Source
19	FW	(Sweden)	Hannes Stiller	35	Ljungskile SK	End of contract	Winter	Free	ifkgoteborg.se
21	MF	(Sweden)	Pontus Farnerud	33	Retirement	End of contract	Winter	—	ifkgoteborg.se
13	FW	(Sweden)	Sebastian Ohlsson	20	Örgryte IS	End of contract	Winter	Free	fotbolltransfers.com
3	DF	(Iceland)	Logi Valgarðsson	25	Sogndal	Transfer	Winter	Undisclosed	ifkgoteborg.se
18	FW	(Sweden)	Pär Ericsson	25	Mons	End of contract	Winter	Free	fotbolltransfers.com
24	DF	(Sweden)	Mikael Dyrestam	22	Aalesund	End of contract	Winter	Free	ifkgoteborg.se
7	FW	(Sweden)	Tobias Hysén	31	Shanghai Dongya	Transfer	Winter	(~ 9.5M SEK)	ifkgoteborg.se
16	DF	(Sweden)	Erik Lund	25	Varbergs BoIS	End of contract	Winter	Free	ifkgoteborg.se
8	MF	(Sweden)	Nordin Gerzić	30	Örebro SK	Loan	Winter	—	ifkgoteborg.se
20	DF	(Sweden)	Jonathan Azulay	20	Östersunds FK	Loan	Winter	—	ifkgoteborg.se
18	MF	(Sweden)	Darijan Bojanić	19	Helsingborgs IF	Transfer	Summer	(~ 0.75M SEK)	ifkgoteborg.se
21	FW	(Senegal)	Malick Mané	25	Central Coast Mariners	Loan	Summer	—	ifkgoteborg.se
10	MF	(Brazil)	Daniel Sobralense	31	Örebro SK	Loan	Summer	—	ifkgoteborg.se
17	FW	(Sweden)	Sam Larsson	21	Heerenveen	Transfer	Summer	(~ 13.0M SEK)	ifkgoteborg.se
11	FW	(Sweden)	Robin Söder	23	Esbjerg fB	Transfer	Summer	(~ 2.5M SEK)	ifkgoteborg.se

== Squad statistics ==
=== Appearances and goals ===
Number	Position	Name	2014 Allsvenskan		2013–14 Svenska Cupen 2014–15 Svenska Cupen		2014–15 UEFA Europa League		Total	
Number	Position	Name	Appearances	Goals	Appearances	Goals	Appearances	Goals	Appearances	Goals
1	GK	John Alvbåge	19	0	4	0	2	0	25	0
2	DF	Emil Salomonsson	24	3	2	0	3	0	29	3
3	MF	Hampus Zackrisson	2	0	1	0	0	0	3	0
4	DF	Kjetil Wæhler	19	1	4	2	2	0	25	3
5	MF	Philip Haglund	7	0	3	1	0	0	10	1
6	DF	Ludwig Augustinsson	28	1	5	0	5	0	38	1
8	MF	Søren Rieks	12	2	0	0	0	0	12	2
9	MF	Martin Smedberg-Dalence	22	2	4	0	4	0	30	2
12	GK	Marcus Sandberg	11	0	1	0	4	0	16	0
13	MF	Gustav Svensson	24	0	0	0	5	0	29	0
14	DF	Hjálmar Jónsson	9	0	2	0	5	0	16	0
15	MF	Jakob Johansson	27	4	5	1	6	1	38	6
16	FW	Kenneth Zohore	5	2	1	1	0	0	6	3
19	FW	Gustav Engvall	20	8	2	0	2	0	24	8
22	DF	Adam Johansson	16	0	3	0	6	0	25	0
24	MF	Diego Calvo	3	0	1	2	0	0	4	2
25	GK	Mattias Hugosson	0	0	0	0	0	0	0	0
26	MF	May Mahlangu	24	5	0	0	6	2	30	7
27	MF	Joel Allansson	21	0	1	1	4	0	26	1
29	FW	Lasse Vibe	26	23	4	4	6	2	36	29
30	DF	Mattias Bjärsmyr	30	0	4	0	6	0	40	0
31	DF	Patrick Dyrestam	0	0	1	0	0	0	1	0
32	MF	Karl Bohm	1	0	1	0	0	0	2	0
33	DF	Billy Nordström	0	0	1	0	0	0	1	0
Players that left the club during the season
8	MF	Nordin Gerzić	0	0	2	0	0	0	2	0
10	MF	Daniel Sobralense	8	0	1	1	4	0	13	1
11	FW	Robin Söder	19	2	5	6	5	0	29	8
17	FW	Sam Larsson	18	2	4	1	6	0	28	3
18	MF	Darijan Bojanić	3	1	3	1	0	0	6	2
21	FW	Malick Mané	11	1	1	0	1	0	13	1

=== Disciplinary record ===
N	P	Nat.	Name	Allsvenskan			Svenska Cupen			UEFA Europa League			Total			Notes
N	P	Nat.	Name	Yellow card	Second yellow card	Red card	Yellow card	Second yellow card	Red card	Yellow card	Second yellow card	Red card	Yellow card	Second yellow card	Red card	Notes
1	GK	(Sweden)	John Alvbåge	1									1			
4	DF	(Norway)	Kjetil Wæhler	2		2	1			1			4		2	
5	MF	(Sweden)	Philip Haglund	1									1			
6	DF	(Sweden)	Ludwig Augustinsson	3			1			3			7			
9	MF	(Sweden)	Martin Smedberg-Dalence	3						1			4			
11	FW	(Sweden)	Robin Söder	2									2			
12	GK	(Sweden)	Marcus Sandberg	1									1			
13	MF	(Sweden)	Gustav Svensson	3		1							3		1	
15	MF	(Sweden)	Jakob Johansson	3									3			
17	FW	(Sweden)	Sam Larsson	2									2			
21	FW	(Senegal)	Malick Mané	1									1			
22	DF	(Sweden)	Adam Johansson	3			1						4			
26	MF	(South Africa)	May Mahlangu	1						1			2			
29	FW	(Denmark)	Lasse Vibe	2									2			
30	DF	(Sweden)	Mattias Bjärsmyr	2									2			
32	MF	(Sweden)	Karl Bohm				1						1			

Source: ifkgoteborg.se
Only competitive matches
(yellow card) = Number of bookings; (second yellow card) = Number of sending offs after a second yellow card; (red card) = Number of sending offs by a direct red card.

== Club ==
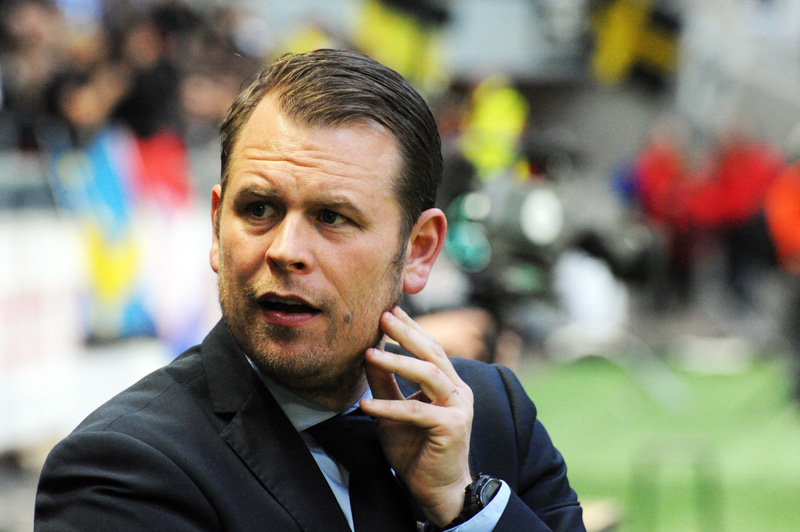
The 2014 season was Mikael Stahre's third and last season with IFK Göteborg.

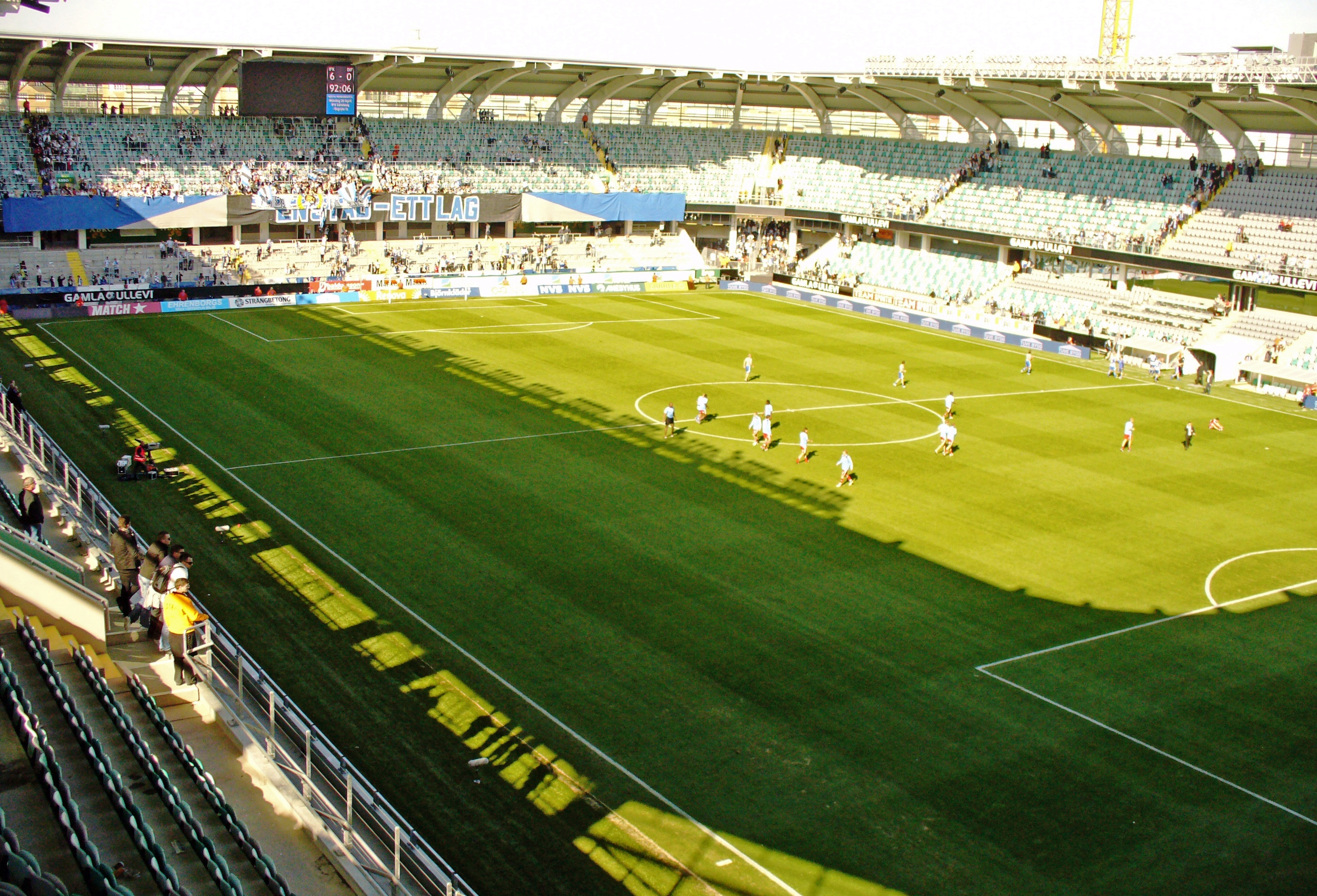
Gamla Ullevi was the fourth largest stadium in Allsvenskan in 2014.

=== Coaching staff ===
Name	Role
(Sweden) Mikael Stahre	Head coach
(Sweden) Magnus Edlund	Assistant coach / U21 head coach
(Sweden) Johan Kristoffersson	Fitness coach
(Sweden) Stefan Remnér	Goalkeeping coach
(Sweden) Fredrik Larsson	Physiotherapist
(Sweden) Tim Rahmquist	Physiotherapist
(Sweden) Jon Karlsson	Club doctor
(Sweden) Leif Swärd	Club doctor
(Sweden) Lennart Sugiardjo	Club doctor
(Sweden) Johan Örtendahl	Mental coach
(Sweden) Bertil Lundqvist	Equipment manager
(Sweden) Rolf Gustavsson	Equipment manager
(Sweden) Alf Westerberg	U21 assistant coach / U19 head coach
(Sweden) Thomas Olsson	U19 assistant coach
(Sweden) Roger Gustafsson	Head coach youth academy
(Sweden) Olle Sultan	Head scout

=== Other information ===
Chairman	(Sweden) Karl Jartun
Club director	(Sweden) Martin Kurzwelly
Director of sports	(Sweden) Mats Gren
Ground (capacity and dimensions)	Gamla Ullevi (18,900 / 105x68 m)

Source: IFK Göteborg and Gamla Ullevi

== Competitions ==
=== Overall ===
Competition	Started round	Final position / round	First match	Last match
Allsvenskan	N/A	2nd	31 March 2013	3 November 2013
Svenska Cupen	Round 2	Quarter-finals	22 August 2013	23 March 2014
UEFA Europa League	First qualifying round	Third qualifying round	3 July 2014	7 August 2014

Source: Competitions

=== Allsvenskan ===
==== League table ====
Pos	Team	Pld	W	D	L	GF	GA	GD	Pts	Qualification or relegation
1	Malmö FF (C)	30	18	8	4	59	31	+28	62	Qualification to Champions League second qualifying round
2	IFK Göteborg	30	15	11	4	58	34	+24	56	Qualification to Europa League second qualifying round (Note: IFK Göteborg qualified for the UEFA Europa League second qualifying round by winning 2014–15 Svenska Cupen.)
3	AIK	30	15	7	8	59	42	+17	52	Qualification to Europa League first qualifying round (Note: IF Elfsborg qualified for the UEFA Europa League first qualifying round as the fourth-placed team since IFK Göteborg, winners of the 2014–15 Svenska Cupen, already qualified based on league position.)
4	IF Elfsborg	30	15	7	8	40	31	+9	52	Qualification to Europa League first qualifying round
5	BK Häcken	30	13	7	10	58	45	+13	46	

Source: svenskfotboll.se (in Swedish)
Rules for classification: 1) points; 2) goal difference; 3) number of goals scored; 4) head-to-head points; 5) head-to-head goal difference; 6) head-to-head away goals scored
(C) Champions

==== Results summary ====
Overall								Home						Away					
Pld	W	D	L	GF	GA	GD	Pts	W	D	L	GF	GA	GD	W	D	L	GF	GA	GD
30	15	11	4	58	34	+24	56	11	2	2	38	15	+23	4	9	2	20	19	+1

Source: svenskfotboll.se (in Swedish)

==== Results by round ====
Round	1	2	3	4	5	6	7	8	9	10	11	12	13	14	15	16	17	18	19	20	21	22	23	24	25	26	27	28	29	30
Ground	A	H	A	H	A	H	H	A	H	A	H	A	H	A	H	A	H	A	A	H	A	H	A	H	A	H	A	H	A	H
Result	W	L	D	W	D	W	D	D	W	D	D	D	W	D	W	L	L	D	D	W	W	W	D	W	W	W	L	W	W	W
Position	3	9	9	4	6	5	6	6	5	6	6	6	5	6	5	6	6	6	6	5	5	4	4	4	3	2	2	2	2	2

Source: see below
A = Away; H = Home; W = Win; D = Draw; L = Loss

==== Matches ====
Kickoff times are in UTC+2 unless stated otherwise.

31 March 2014 Round 1	AIK	0–2	IFK Göteborg	Solna
19:05		Report	Vibe 14'; Mané 86'	Stadium: Friends Arena; Attendance: 30,650; Referee: Stefan Johannesson (Täby)

7 April 2014 Round 2	IFK Göteborg	0–3	Malmö FF	Gothenburg
19:05		Report	Molins 8', 28'; Rosenberg 82'	Stadium: Gamla Ullevi; Attendance: 17,073; Referee: Michael Lerjéus (Skövde)

14 April 2014 Round 3	IF Brommapojkarna	1–1	IFK Göteborg	Stockholm
19:00	Segerström 78'	Report	Söder 13'	Stadium: Grimsta IP; Attendance: 2,065; Referee: Mohammed Al-Hakim (Köping)

17 April 2014 Round 4	IFK Göteborg	5–0	Åtvidabergs FF	Gothenburg
19:00	Vibe 22', 66', 85'; Larsson 79'; Bojanić 90+1'	Report		Stadium: Gamla Ullevi; Attendance: 8,282; Referee: Bojan Pandžić (Gothenburg)

20 April 2014 Round 5	Kalmar FF	1–1	IFK Göteborg	Kalmar
15:00	Hallberg 54'	Report	Smedberg-Dalence 60'	Stadium: Guldfågeln Arena; Attendance: 9,485; Referee: Andreas Ekberg (Lund)

25 April 2014 Round 6	IFK Göteborg	1–0	Falkenbergs FF	Gothenburg
19:00	Larsson 84' (pen.)	Report		Stadium: Gamla Ullevi; Attendance: 11,400; Referee: Glenn Nyberg (Borlänge)

4 May 2014 Round 7	IFK Göteborg	0–0	IF Elfsborg	Gothenburg
17:30		Report		Stadium: Gamla Ullevi; Attendance: 14,833; Referee: Jonas Eriksson (Sigtuna)

8 May 2014 Round 8	Gefle IF	1–1	IFK Göteborg	Gävle
19:00	Lundevall 1'	Report	J. Johansson 61'	Stadium: Strömvallen; Attendance: 3,091; Referee: Mohammed Al-Hakim (Köping)

11 May 2014 Round 9	IFK Göteborg	2–1	Örebro SK	Gothenburg
17:30	Mahlangu 8'; J. Johansson 79'	Report	Moberg 19'	Stadium: Gamla Ullevi; Attendance: 7,537; Referee: Martin Hansson (Holmsjö)

21 May 2014 Round 10	Djurgårdens IF	0–0	IFK Göteborg	Stockholm
19:05		Report		Stadium: Tele2 Arena; Attendance: 18,044; Referee: Jonas Eriksson (Sigtuna)

25 May 2014 Round 11	IFK Göteborg	2–2	IFK Norrköping	Gothenburg
17:30	Vibe 16'; J. Johansson 31'	Report	Meneses 41'; Kamara 52'	Stadium: Gamla Ullevi; Attendance: 9,119; Referee: Markus Strömbergsson (Gävle)

2 June 2014 Round 12	BK Häcken	1–1	IFK Göteborg	Gothenburg
19:05	Simon Gustafson 47'	Report	Zuta 16' (o.g.)	Stadium: Gamla Ullevi; Attendance: 10,579; Referee: Andreas Ekberg (Lund)

6 July 2014 Round 13	IFK Göteborg	6–2	Helsingborgs IF	Gothenburg
17:30	Vibe 16', 28'; J. Johansson 22'; Salomonsson 33'; Söder 58'; Mahlangu 90+4' (pen.)	Report	Lindström 13'; Nordmark 76'	Stadium: Gamla Ullevi; Attendance: 10,202; Referee: Stefan Johannesson (Täby)

13 July 2014 Round 14	Halmstads BK	2–2	IFK Göteborg	Halmstad
17:30	Boman 48'; Baldvinsson 56'	Report	Vibe 73', 83'	Stadium: Örjans Vall; Attendance: 4,723; Referee: Glenn Nyberg (Borlänge)

20 July 2014 Round 15	IFK Göteborg	3–1	Mjällby AIF	Gothenburg
15:00	Vibe 45+2', 51', 61'	Report	Haynes 50' (pen.)	Stadium: Gamla Ullevi; Attendance: 7,298; Referee: Martin Strömbergsson (Gävle)

27 July 2014 Round 16	Mjällby AIF	3–0	IFK Göteborg	Hällevik
15:00	Sandberg 12' (o.g.); Strömberg 52'; Blomqvist 66'	Report		Stadium: Strandvallen; Attendance: 5,906; Referee: Johan Hamlin (Bro)

4 August 2014 Round 17	IFK Göteborg	0–2	AIK	Gothenburg
19:05		Report	Igboananike 34'; Bahoui 60'	Stadium: Gamla Ullevi; Attendance: 14,547; Referee: Martin Hansson (Holmsjö)

10 August 2014 Round 18	Malmö FF	2–2	IFK Göteborg	Malmö
17:30	Rosenberg 27'; Forsberg 83'	Report	Vibe 70'; Engvall 85'	Stadium: Swedbank Stadion; Attendance: 18,838; Referee: Markus Strömbergsson (Gävle)

13 August 2014 Round 19	Åtvidabergs FF	1–1	IFK Göteborg	Åtvidaberg
19:00	Santos 39'	Report	Engvall 59'	Stadium: Kopparvallen; Attendance: 4,497; Referee: Johan Hamlin (Bro)

17 August 2014 Round 20	IFK Göteborg	3–0	IF Brommapojkarna	Gothenburg
17:30	Engvall 4'; Vibe 49'; Zohore 85'	Report		Stadium: Gamla Ullevi; Attendance: 6,382; Referee: Martin Strömbergsson (Gävle)

24 August 2014 Round 21	Falkenbergs FF	1–2	IFK Göteborg	Falkenberg
15:00	A. Wede 77' (pen.)	Report	Rieks 35'; Mahlangu 69'	Stadium: Falkenbergs IP; Attendance: 4,218; Referee: Kristoffer Karlsson (Helsingborg)

31 August 2014 Round 22	IFK Göteborg	2–0	Kalmar FF	Gothenburg
15:00	Engvall 15'; Mahlangu 61' (pen.)	Report		Stadium: Gamla Ullevi; Attendance: 9,102; Referee: Michael Lerjéus (Skövde)

14 September 2014 Round 23	IF Elfsborg	0–0	IFK Göteborg	Borås
17:30		Report		Stadium: Borås Arena; Attendance: 12,657; Referee: Stefan Johannesson (Täby)

19 September 2014 Round 24	IFK Göteborg	4–0	Gefle IF	Gothenburg
19:00	Wæhler 15'; Vibe 17', 41'; Salomonsson 54'	Report		Stadium: Gamla Ullevi; Attendance: 9,382; Referee: Kristoffer Karlsson (Helsingborg)

24 September 2014 Round 25	Örebro SK	3–4	IFK Göteborg	Örebro
19:00	Moberg 28'; Pode 41'; Kamara 67' (pen.)	Report	Vibe 22', 65', 81'; Augustinsson 45+1'	Stadium: Behrn Arena; Attendance: 7,682; Referee: Martin Strömbergsson (Gävle)

29 September 2014 Round 26	IFK Göteborg	2–1	Djurgårdens IF	Gothenburg
19:05	Vibe 7'; Smedberg-Dalence 60'	Report	Andersson 77'	Stadium: Gamla Ullevi; Attendance: 11,159; Referee: Martin Strömbergsson (Gävle)

5 October 2014 Round 27	IFK Norrköping	3–0	IFK Göteborg	Norrköping
15:00	Krogh Gerson 3'; Fransson 40'; Kujović 60'	Report		Stadium: Nya Parken; Attendance: 6,410; Referee: Andreas Ekberg (Lund)

19 October 2014 Round 28	IFK Göteborg	3–2	BK Häcken	Gothenburg
15:00	Vibe 52'; Engvall 70'; Zohore 83'	Report	Jeremejeff 22'; Arkivuo 90+2'	Stadium: Gamla Ullevi; Attendance: 13,089; Referee: Johan Hamlin (Bro)

27 October 2014 Round 29	Helsingborgs IF	0–3	IFK Göteborg	Helsingborg
19:05 UTC+1		Report	Mahlangu 7'; Vibe 20'; Rieks 52'	Stadium: Olympia; Attendance: 8,134; Referee: Martin Strömbergsson (Gävle)

1 November 2014 Round 30	IFK Göteborg	5–1	Halmstads BK	Gothenburg
13:00 UTC+1	Engvall 42', 86', 90+1'; Vibe 48'; Salomonsson 70'	Report	Blomberg 49'	Stadium: Gamla Ullevi; Attendance: 11,673; Referee: Glenn Nyberg (Borlänge)

=== Svenska Cupen ===
==== 2013–14 ====
The tournament continued from the 2013 season.

Kickoff times are in UTC+1.

===== Group stage =====
Pos	Team	Pld	W	D	L	GF	GA	GD	Pts	Qualification	IFKG	IFKG	HFF	IFKV
1	IFK Göteborg	3	3	0	0	16	2	+14	9	Advance to Knockout stage	—	4–2	—	2–0
2	GIF Sundsvall	3	1	1	1	4	4	0	4		—	—	—	0–0
3	Hudiksvalls FF	3	1	0	2	2	12	−10	3		0–10	0–2	—	—
4	IFK Värnamo	3	0	1	2	0	4	−4	1		—	—	0–2	—

1 March 2014 Matchday 1	IFK Göteborg	2–0	IFK Värnamo	Gothenburg
16:00	Wæhler 61'; Söder 74'	Report		Stadium: Valhalla IP; Attendance: 2,614; Referee: Jim Petersson (Motala)

8 March 2014 Matchday 2	Hudiksvalls FF	0–10	IFK Göteborg	Hudiksvall
14:00		Report	Söder 23', 33', 45', 49', 60'; Haglund 27' (pen.); Vibe 50', 51'; Sobralense 81'; Bojanić 88'	Stadium: Glysisvallen; Attendance: 1,463; Referee: Lars Olsson (Umeå)

15 March 2014 Matchday 3	IFK Göteborg	4–2	GIF Sundsvall	Gothenburg
12:00	Vibe 2', 66'; Wæhler 26'; Larsson 77'	Report	Bjärsmyr 15' (o.g.); Dibba 29'	Stadium: Ullevi; Attendance: 4,850; Referee: Bojan Pandžić (Gothenburg)

===== Knockout stage =====
23 March 2014 Quarter-finals	IFK Göteborg	0–1	IK Sirius	Gothenburg
15:00		Report	Ogbu 29'	Stadium: Ullevi; Attendance: 4,689; Referee: Bojan Pandžić (Gothenburg)

==== 2014–15 ====
The tournament continued into the 2015 season.

===== Qualification stage =====
20 August 2014 Round 2	Assyriska Turabdin IK	0–5	IFK Göteborg	Jönköping
19:00 UTC+2		Report	J. Johansson 17'; Allansson 39'; Zohore 53'; Calvo 59', 89'	Stadium: Stadsparksvallen; Attendance: 1,300; Referee: Mikael Eriksson (Jönköping)

=== UEFA Europa League ===
Kickoff times are in UTC+2 unless stated otherwise.

==== Qualifying phase and play-off round ====
===== First qualifying round =====
3 July 2014 First leg	IFK Göteborg (Sweden)	0–0	(Luxembourg) Fola Esch	Gothenburg, Sweden
19:00		Report		Stadium: Gamla Ullevi; Attendance: 5,919; Referee: Nikola Dabanović (Montenegro)

10 July 2014 Second leg	Fola Esch (Luxembourg)	0–2 (0–2 agg.)	(Sweden) IFK Göteborg	Luxembourg City, Luxembourg
19:00		Report	Vibe 76'; Mahlangu 81'	Stadium: Stade Josy Barthel; Attendance: 1,516; Referee: Jakob Kehlet (Denmark)

===== Second qualifying round =====
17 July 2014 First leg	Győr (Hungary)	0–3	(Sweden) IFK Göteborg	Győr, Hungary
20:00		Report	Vibe 8'; J. Johansson 56'; Mahlangu 83'	Stadium: ETO Park; Attendance: 2,948; Referee: Anatoliy Abdula (Ukraine)

24 July 2014 Second leg	IFK Göteborg (Sweden)	0–1 (3–1 agg.)	(Hungary) Győr	Gothenburg, Sweden
19:00		Report	Andrić 68'	Stadium: Gamla Ullevi; Attendance: 6,112; Referee: Bartosz Frankowski (Poland)

===== Third qualifying round =====
31 July 2014 First leg	IFK Göteborg (Sweden)	0–1	(Portugal) Rio Ave	Gothenburg, Sweden
19:00		Report	Koka 22'	Stadium: Gamla Ullevi; Attendance: 7,137; Referee: Fernando Teixeira Vitienes (Spain)

7 August 2014 Second leg	Rio Ave (Portugal)	0–0 (1–0 agg.)	(Sweden) IFK Göteborg	Vila do Conde, Portugal
20:00 UTC+1		Report		Stadium: Estádio do Rio Ave; Attendance: 6,735; Referee: Paolo Valeri (Italy)

== Non-competitive ==
=== Pre-season ===
Kickoff times are in UTC+1.

30 January 2014 Friendly	Steaua București (Romania)	0–0	(Sweden) IFK Göteborg	Marbella, Spain
18:30		Report		Stadium: Estadio Municipal; Attendance: 100; Referee: Juan Miguel Fort (Spain)

3 February 2014 Marbella Cup; Semi-finals	IFK Göteborg (Sweden)	4–0	(Bulgaria) Lokomotiv Plovdiv	Marbella, Spain
18:00	Bojanić 29' (pen.); Vibe 31'; Engvall 74'; Augustinsson 81'	Report		Stadium: Estadio Municipal; Attendance: 100

6 February 2014 Marbella Cup; Final	Dinamo București (Romania)	2–0	(Sweden) IFK Göteborg	Marbella, Spain
18:00	Thicot 34'; Biliński 81'	Report		Stadium: Estadio Municipal; Attendance: 50

15 February 2014 Friendly	IFK Göteborg (Sweden)	1–3	(Denmark) AaB	Gothenburg, Sweden
13:00	Augustinsson 61'	Report	Kusk 36'; Spalvis 44', 47'	Stadium: Valhalla IP; Attendance: 2,402; Referee: Bojan Pandžić (Gothenburg)

21 February 2014 Friendly	Östers IF	1–0	IFK Göteborg	Växjö, Sweden
18:30	Birgersson 35'	Report		Stadium: Växjö Tipshall; Attendance: 923; Referee: Kristoffer Karlsson (Helsingborg)

=== Mid-season ===
Kickoff times are in UTC+2.

19 June 2014 Friendly	IFK Göteborg (Sweden)	5–1	(Norway) Strømsgodset IF	Grebbestad, Sweden
19:00	Bojanić 47'; Engvall 53'; Mahlangu 65', 77' (pen.); Vibe 74'	Report	Kovács 44'	Stadium: Siljevi IP; Attendance: 500; Referee: Antti Kanerva (Olofstorp)

25 June 2014 Friendly	OB (Denmark)	0–1	(Sweden) IFK Göteborg	Odense, Denmark
19:00		Report	Kryger 16' (o.g.)	Stadium: TRE-FOR Park; Attendance: 1,000
