= 2017–18 FC Nantes season =

Nantes
2017–18 season
- Chairman: Waldemar Kita
- Manager: Claudio Ranieri
- Stadium: La Beaujoire-Louis Fonteneau
- Ligue 1: 9th
- Coupe de France: Round of 32 (eliminated by Auxerre)
- Coupe de la Ligue: Third round (eliminated by Tours)
- Top goalscorer: League: Emiliano Sala (12); All: Emiliano Sala (14)
- Highest home attendance: 34,486 vs. Paris Saint-Germain (14 January 2018)
- Lowest home attendance: 13,618 vs. Auxerre (23 January 2018)
Home colours	Away colours	Third colours

The 2017–18 FC Nantes season was the 74th professional season of the club since its creation in 1943, and the club's 5th consecutive season in the top flight of French football. It covers a period from 1 July 2017 to 30 June 2018. They participated in the Ligue 1, the Coupe de France and Coupe de la Ligue.

== Players ==
Note: Flags indicate national team as defined under FIFA eligibility rules; some limited exceptions apply. Players may hold more than one non-FIFA nationality.

No.	Pos.	Nation	Player
1	GK	FRA	Maxime Dupé
2	DF	FRA	David Alcibiade
3	DF	BRA	Diego Carlos
4	DF	FRA	Nicolas Pallois
5	DF	CIV	Koffi Djidji
6	DF	BRA	Lucas Lima
7	MF	FRA	Jules Iloki
8	MF	FRA	Adrien Thomasson
9	FW	ARG	Emiliano Sala
10	FW	MAR	Yacine Bammou
11	MF	SWE	Alexander Kačaniklić
12	DF	NGR	Chidozie Awaziem (on loan from Porto)
13	DF	FRA	Wilfried Moimbé
14	FW	BEL	Yassine El Ghanassy
15	DF	FRA	Léo Dubois (captain)
16	GK	FRA	Alexandre Olliero

No.	Pos.	Nation	Player
17	DF	COD	Anthony Walongwa
18	MF	FRA	Samuel Moutoussamy
19	MF	FRA	Abdoulaye Touré
20	MF	BRA	Andrei Girotto
21	MF	SLO	Rene Krhin (on loan from Granada)
22	FW	BFA	Préjuce Nakoulma
23	FW	BEL	Joris Kayembe
24	MF	CMR	Alexis Alégué
25	DF	FRA	Enock Kwateng
26	FW	MLI	Kalifa Coulibaly
28	MF	FRA	Valentin Rongier
29	MF	FRA	Najib Gandi
30	GK	ROU	Ciprian Tătărușanu
31	FW	ISL	Kolbeinn Sigþórsson
33	FW	FRA	Santy Ngom
40	GK	FRA	Quentin Braat

=== Out on loan ===
Note: Flags indicate national team as defined under FIFA eligibility rules; some limited exceptions apply. Players may hold more than one non-FIFA nationality.

No.	Pos.	Nation	Player
—	MF	NED	Queensy Menig (at Oldham Athletic until 30 June 2018)
—	FW	POL	Mariusz Stępiński (at Chievo Verona until 30 June 2018)

== Competitions ==
=== Ligue 1 ===
==== League table ====
Pos	Team	Pld	W	D	L	GF	GA	GD	Pts
7	Saint-Étienne	38	15	10	13	47	50	−3	55
8	Nice	38	15	9	14	53	52	+1	54
9	Nantes	38	14	10	14	36	41	−5	52
10	Montpellier	38	11	18	9	36	33	+3	51
11	Dijon	38	13	9	16	55	73	−18	48

Source: Ligue 1 and Soccerway
Rules for classification: 1) Points; 2) Goal difference; 3) Head-to-head points; 4) Head-to-head goal difference; 5) Head-to-head goals scored; 6) Head-to-head away goals; 7) Goals scored; 8) Away goals scored; 9) Most goals scored in one league match; 10) Fair-play points

==== Results summary ====
Overall								Home						Away					
Pld	W	D	L	GF	GA	GD	Pts	W	D	L	GF	GA	GD	W	D	L	GF	GA	GD
38	14	10	14	36	41	−5	52	8	4	7	15	17	−2	6	6	7	21	24	−3

Last updated: 19 May 2018.
Source: Results

==== Results by round ====
Round	1	2	3	4	5	6	7	8	9	10	11	12	13	14	15	16	17	18	19	20	21	22	23	24	25	26	27	28	29	30	31	32	33	34	35	36	37	38
Ground	A	H	A	H	A	H	A	H	A	H	A	H	A	A	H	A	H	H	A	H	A	H	A	A	H	A	H	A	H	A	H	A	H	H	A	H	A	H
Result	L	L	W	D	W	W	W	W	D	W	L	W	L	L	W	D	L	W	W	L	D	L	W	L	D	D	L	D	W	D	L	L	D	D	L	L	W	W
Position	19	19	15	15	8	7	6	4	5	3	5	5	5	5	5	5	5	5	5	5	5	5	5	5	5	5	6	7	5	6	8	8	9	9	10	10	10	9

A = Away; H = Home; W = Win; D = Draw; L = Loss

==== Matches ====
6 August 2017 1	Lille	3–0	Nantes	Villeneuve-d'Ascq
15:00	Alonso 48'; Benzia (yellow card) 61'; De Préville 67' (pen.); El Ghazi 70', (yellow card) 71'	Report	Pallois (yellow card) 40'; Nakoulma (yellow card) 58'; Gillet (yellow card) 75'	Stadium: Stade Pierre-Mauroy; Attendance: 30,683; Referee: Benoît Millot

12 August 2017 2	Nantes	0–1	Marseille	Nantes
17:00	Lucas Lima (yellow card) 15'	Report	Sanson (yellow card) 60'; Ocampos 87'; Rolando (yellow card) 90+3'; Luiz Gustavo (yellow card) 90+4'	Stadium: Stade de la Beaujoire; Attendance: 33,654; Referee: Frank Schneider

19 August 2017 3	Troyes	0–1	Nantes	Troyes
20:00	Darbion (yellow card) 79'	Report	Awaziem (red card) 34'; Sala 81'	Stadium: Stade de l'Aube; Attendance: 11,035; Referee: Sébastien Desiage

26 August 2017 4	Nantes	0–0	Lyon	Nantes
17:15	Girotto (yellow card) 31'	Report	Tete (yellow card) 68'	Stadium: Stade de la Beaujoire; Attendance: 30,718; Referee: Antony Gautier

9 September 2017 5	Montpellier	0–1	Nantes	Montpellier
20:00	Mukiele (yellow card) 33'; Sio (red card) 84'	Report	Sala (yellow card) 42'; Gandi (yellow card) 69'; Diego Carlos 76'	Stadium: Stade de la Mosson; Attendance: 10,298; Referee: Jérôme Miguelgorry

16 September 2017 6	Nantes	1–0	Caen	Nantes
20:00	Girotto 73'	Report	Repas (yellow card) 26'; Aït Bennasser (yellow card) 87'	Stadium: Stade de la Beaujoire; Attendance: 20,245; Referee: Olivier Thual

24 September 2017 7	Strasbourg	1–2	Nantes	Strasbourg
17:00	Da Costa 10'; Seka (yellow card) 47'	Report	Thomasson 13'; Dubois 24'; Girotto (yellow card) 40'	Stadium: Stade de la Meinau; Attendance: 23,408; Referee: Sébastien Desiage

30 September 2017 8	Nantes	1–0	Metz	Nantes
20:00	Sala 3'; Lucas Lima (yellow card) 90'; Girotto (yellow card) 90+3'	Report	Assou-Ekotto (yellow card) 47' (yellow-red card) 52'; Cohade (yellow card) 65'; Balliu (yellow card) 90+6'	Stadium: Stade de la Beaujoire; Attendance: 22,104; Referee: Johan Hamel

15 October 2017 9	Bordeaux	1–1	Nantes	Bordeaux
15:00	Pellenard (yellow card) 24'; De Préville (yellow card) 26'; Malcom 47'; Lewczuk (yellow card) 84'	Report	Krhin (yellow card) 19'; Nakoulma 45+2'; Thomasson (yellow card) 71'	Stadium: Nouveau Stade de Bordeaux; Attendance: 31,046; Referee: Karim Abed

21 October 2017 10	Nantes	2–1	Guingamp	Nantes
20:00	Awaziem 9'; Nakoulma (yellow card) 43'; Touré (yellow card) 49', (goal) 86'; Diego Carlos (yellow card) 71'	Report	Kerbrat (yellow card) 26'; Camara 70'	Stadium: Stade de la Beaujoire; Attendance: 27,711; Referee: Amaury Delerue

28 October 2017 11	Dijon	1–0	Nantes	Dijon
20:00	Tavares 21'; Amalfitano (yellow card) 60'; Yambéré (yellow card) 65'; Haddadi (yellow card) 90'	Report	Touré (yellow card) 71'; Sala (yellow card) 86'; Dubois (yellow card) 90'	Stadium: Stade Gaston Gérard; Attendance: 11,764; Referee: Hakim Ben El Hadj

4 November 2017 12	Nantes	2–1	Toulouse	Nantes
20:00	Thomasson 16'; Krhin (yellow card) 40'; Iloki (yellow card) 57'; Sala 67'	Report	Yago (yellow card) 4'; Imbula (yellow card) 31'; Sanogo (yellow card) 55'; Diop (yellow card) 58'; Blin 60'	Stadium: Stade de la Beaujoire; Attendance: 21,390; Referee: Antony Gautier

18 November 2017 13	Paris Saint-Germain	4–1	Nantes	Paris
17:00 CET (UTC+1)	Cavani 38', 79'; Di María 42'; Berchiche (yellow card) 49'; Pastore 65'; Verratti (yellow card) 74'	Report	Pallois (yellow card) 49'; Nakoulma 60'; Awaziem (yellow card) 63'; Djidji (yellow card) 65'	Stadium: Parc des Princes; Attendance: 47,680; Referee: Nicolas Rainville

25 November 2017 14	Rennes	2–1	Nantes	Rennes
17:00	Traoré (yellow card) 3'; Khazri 51', 88', (yellow card) 90+4'; Lea Siliki (yellow card) 67'	Report	Nakoulma (yellow card) 31'; Dubois (yellow card) 40'; Pallois (yellow card) 51' (yellow-red card) 57'; Sala 73' (pen.); Thomasson (yellow card) 82'	Stadium: Roazhon Park; Attendance: 26,151; Referee: Ruddy Buquet

29 November 2017 15	Nantes	1–0	Monaco	Nantes
19:00 CET (UTC+01:00)	Lucas Lima 90+2'	Report		Stadium: Stade de la Beaujoire; Attendance: 24,800; Referee: Benoît Millot

3 December 2017 16	Saint-Étienne	1–1	Nantes	Saint-Étienne
15:00 CET (UTC+01:00)	Pajot 38'; Janko (yellow card) 51'; Lacroix (yellow card) 58'; Selnæs (yellow card) 80'; Dabo (yellow card) 88'	Report	Sala 61'; Awaziem (yellow card) 72'	Stadium: Stade Geoffroy-Guichard; Attendance: 24,085; Referee: François Letexier

10 December 2017 17	Nantes	1–2	Nice	Nantes
17:00 CET (UTC+01:00)	Bammou 12'; Diego Carlos (yellow card) 67'	Report	Lees-Melou (yellow card) 21'; Tameze (yellow card) 37'; Balotelli (yellow card) 40', (goal) 75'; Pléa 42'; Souquet (yellow card) 85'	Stadium: Stade de la Beaujoire; Attendance: 19,723; Referee: Jerome Miguelgorry

17 December 2017 18	Nantes	1–0	Angers	Nantes
15:00	Girotto (yellow card) 13'; Sala 24' (pen.); Bammou (yellow card) 45+1' (yellow-red card) 65'	Report	Thomas (yellow card) 9'; Tait (yellow card) 24'; Crivelli (yellow card) 63'	Stadium: Stade de la Beaujoire; Attendance: 24,285; Referee: Karim Abed

20 December 2017 19	Amiens	0–1	Nantes	Amiens
20:50	Gouano (yellow card) 13'; Manzala (yellow card) 79'; El Hajjam (yellow card) 86'	Report	Lucas Lima (yellow card) 40'; Dubois (yellow card) 89'; Sala 90+2'	Stadium: Stade de la Licorne; Attendance: 8,865; Referee: Jérôme Brisard

14 January 2018 20	Nantes	0–1	Paris Saint-Germain	Nantes
21:00 CET (UTC+1)	Diego Carlos (yellow card) 30' (yellow-red card) 90+1'; Pallois (yellow card) 41'	Report	Di María 12'; Verratti (yellow card) 15'; Dani Alves (yellow card) 60'	Stadium: Stade de la Beaujoire; Attendance: 34,486; Referee: Tony Chapron

17 January 2018 21	Toulouse	1–1	Nantes	Toulouse
17:00	Diop (yellow card) 5'; Sangaré (yellow card) 40'; Sylla (yellow card) 60'; Gradel 90+5' (pen.)	Report	Krhin (yellow card) 14', (goal) 19'; Touré (yellow card) 39'; Diego Carlos (yellow card) 54'; Girotto (yellow card) 90'	Stadium: Stadium Municipal; Attendance: 13,742; Referee: Thomas Léonard

20 January 2018 22	Nantes	0–1	Bordeaux	Nantes
17:00	Pallois (yellow card) 88'	Report	De Préville 26'; Laborde (yellow card) 36'; Lerager (yellow card) 80'	Stadium: Stade de la Beaujoire; Attendance: 26,076; Referee: Johan Hamel

27 January 2018 23	Guingamp	0–3	Nantes	Guingamp
20:00	Diallo (yellow card) 50'; Ikoko (yellow card) 64'	Report	Diego Carlos (yellow card) 17'; Krhin (yellow card) 30'; Pallois (yellow card) 40'; Thomasson 61'; Sala 86' (pen.); Ngom 90+3'	Stadium: Stade de Roudourou; Attendance: 13,761; Referee: Benoît Millot

4 February 2018 24	Caen	3–2	Nantes	Caen
17:00	Djiku (yellow card) 22'; Santini 35' (pen.); Da Silva 52', 80'	Report	Bammou 31', 58'; Dubois (yellow card) 33'; Diego Carlos (yellow card) 48'	Stadium: Stade Michel d'Ornano; Attendance: 16,121; Referee: Karim Abed

11 February 2018 25	Nantes	2–2	Lille	Nantes
17:00	Sala 16', 71'	Report	Benzia (yellow card) 43'; Mothiba 67'; Pépé 81'	Stadium: Stade de la Beaujoire; Attendance: 22,655; Referee: Mikael Lesage

18 February 2018 26	Nice	1–1	Nantes	Nice
15:00	Dante 6'; Pléa (yellow card) 63'; Lees-Melou (yellow card) 77'	Report	Sala 26' (pen.)	Stadium: Allianz Riviera; Attendance: 20,966; Referee: Clément Turpin

24 February 2018 27	Nantes	0–1	Amiens	Nantes
20:00	Girotto (yellow card) 11'; Pallois (yellow card) 61'	Report	Monconduit (yellow card) 38'; Kakuta 45+1', (yellow card) 67'	Stadium: Stade de la Beaujoire; Attendance: 18,830; Referee: Stéphane Jochem

4 March 2018 28	Marseille	1–1	Nantes	Marseille
21:00	Gustavo (yellow card) 4'; Rami (yellow card) 55'; Amavi (yellow card) 69'; Thauvin 90+5'	Report	Dubois 11', (yellow card) 35'; Pallois (yellow card) 39' (yellow-red card) 90+5'; Girotto (yellow card) 87'	Stadium: Stade Vélodrome; Attendance: 35,232; Referee: Antony Gautier

10 March 2018 29	Nantes	1–0	Troyes	Nantes
20:00	Sala 86'	Report	Walter (yellow card) 7'	Stadium: Stade de la Beaujoire; Attendance: 17,776; Referee: Jérôme Brisard

18 March 2018 30	Metz	1–1	Nantes	Metz
15:00	Roux 12'; Rivierez (yellow card) 13'; Diagne (yellow card) 54'	Report	Rongier 23'	Stadium: Stade Saint-Symphorien; Attendance: 13,058; Referee: Benoît Millot

1 April 2018 31	Nantes	0–3	Saint-Étienne	Nantes
17:00	Thomasson (yellow card) 56'; Rongier (yellow card) 61'; Bammou (yellow card) 67'	Report	Debuchy 17'; Cabella 54', 63'	Stadium: Stade de la Beaujoire; Attendance: 31,043; Referee: Pierre Gaillouste

7 April 2018 32	Monaco	2–1	Nantes	Monaco
17:00 CEST (UTC+02:00)	Jorge (yellow card) 38'; Falcao 42'; Lopes 45'; Glik (yellow card) 59'; Jemerson (yellow card) 73'; Subašić (yellow card) 90+4'	Report	Thomasson 32'; Krhin (yellow card) 48'; Dubois (yellow card) 87'; Sala (yellow card) 90+4'	Stadium: Stade Louis II; Attendance: 8,557; Referee: François Letexier

14 April 2018 33	Nantes	1–1	Dijon	Nantes
20:00	Nakoulma 33'	Report	Kwon 61'	Stadium: Stade de la Beaujoire; Attendance: 19,209; Referee: Olivier Thual

20 April 2018 34	Nantes	1–1	Rennes	Nantes
19:30	Nakoulma (yellow card) 29'; Sala (yellow card) 40' (yellow-red card) 46'; Thomasson 42', (yellow card) 43'; Girotto (yellow card) 44'; Ngom (yellow card) 90+1'	Report	Sakho (yellow card) 68'; Prcic (yellow card) 71'; Pallois 81' (o.g.)	Stadium: Stade de la Beaujoire; Attendance: 32,431; Referee: Benoît Bastien

28 April 2018 35	Lyon	2–0	Nantes	Décines-Charpieu
17:00	Depay 40'; Morel (yellow card) 59'; Traoré 69'	Report	El Ghanassy (yellow card) 77'	Stadium: Parc Olympique Lyonnais; Attendance: 50,443; Referee: Antony Gautier

6 May 2018 36	Nantes	0–2	Montpellier	Nantes
17:00		Report	Cozza (yellow card) 41'; Dolly 51'; Mbenza 63'; Mendes (yellow card) 82'; Poaty (yellow card) 86'	Stadium: Stade de la Beaujoire; Attendance: 19,895; Referee: Frank Schneider

12 May 2018 37	Angers	0–2	Nantes	Angers
21:00		Report	Djidji (yellow card) 4'; Lucas Lima 50'; Coulibaly 62'	Stadium: Stade Raymond Kopa; Attendance: 15,550; Referee: Benoît Millot

19 May 2018 38	Nantes	1–0	Strasbourg	Nantes
21:00	Dubois 32'	Report		Stadium: Stade de la Beaujoire; Attendance: 19,595; Referee: Ruddy Buquet

=== Coupe de France ===
7 January 2018 Round of 64	US Municipale Senlis	0–4	Nantes	Beauvais
17:30 CET		Report	Bammou 28'; Rongier 36'; Sala 81', 90'	Stadium: Stade Pierre Brisson; Attendance: 5,000; Referee: Bastien Dechepy

23 January 2018 Round of 32	Nantes	3–4	Auxerre	Nantes
18:30 CET	Thomasson 38', 65'; Dubois 51'; Lucas Lima (red card) 70'	Report	Touré (yellow card) 3'; Konaté 6'; Pallois 32' (o.g.); Westberg (yellow card) 32'; Ayé 34'; Sangaré 76'	Stadium: Stade de la Beaujoire; Attendance: 13,618; Referee: Amaury Delerue

=== Coupe de la Ligue ===
25 October 2017 Third Round	Tours	3–1	Nantes	Tours
21:05 CEST	Miguel 4'; Mancini 6'; Raveloson (yellow card) 17'; Bouazza 19'	Report	Lucas Lima 35' (pen.); Walongwa (yellow card) 50' (yellow-red card) 57'; Alcibiade (yellow card) 77'	Stadium: Stade de la Vallée du Cher; Attendance: 9,477; Referee: Thomas Léonard
