= List of Inter Milan honours =

This is a list of Inter Milan honours. Inter Milan is an Italian football club. This article contains historical and current trophies pertaining to the club.

== National titles (39) ==
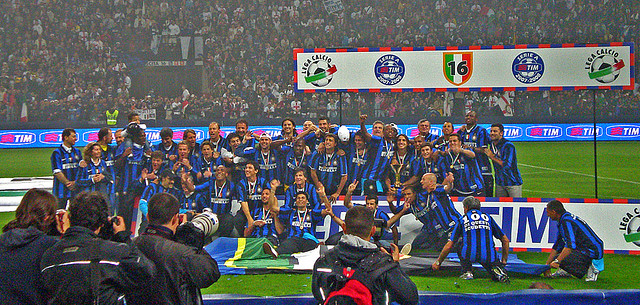
Inter Milan players celebrating the club's sixteenth Scudetto.

- Italian Football Championship/Serie A:

- Winners (21): 1909–10, 1919–20, 1929–30, 1937–38, 1939–40, 1952–53, 1953–54, 1962–63, 1964–65, 1965–66, 1970–71, 1979–80, 1988–89, 2005–06, (Note: Title was awarded retroactively following the Calciopoli scandal.) 2006–07, 2007–08, 2008–09, 2009–10, 2020–21, 2023–24, 2025–26
- Runners-up (17): 1932–33, 1933–34, 1934–35, 1940–41, 1948–49, 1950–51, 1961–62, 1963–64, 1966–67, 1969–70, 1992–93, 1997–98, 2002–03, 2010–11, 2019–20, 2021–22, 2024–25

- Coppa Italia:

- Winners (10): 1938–39, 1977–78, 1981–82, 2004–05, 2005–06, 2009–10, 2010–11, 2021–22, 2022–23, 2025–26
- Runners-up (6): 1958–59, 1964–65, 1976–77, 1999–2000, 2006–07, 2007–08

- Supercoppa Italiana:

- Winners (8): 1989, 2005, 2006, 2008, 2010, 2021, 2022, 2023
- Runners-up (5): 2000, 2007, 2009, 2011, 2024–25

== European titles (6) ==
- European Cup/UEFA Champions League:

- Winners (3): 1963–64, 1964–65, 2009–10
- Runners-up (4): 1966–67, 1971–72, 2022–23, 2024–25

- UEFA Cup/UEFA Europa League:

- Winners (3): 1990–91, 1993–94, 1997–98
- Runners-up (2): 1996–97, 2019–20

- UEFA Super Cup:

- Runners-up (1): 2010

- Mitropa Cup:

- Runners-up (1): 1933

== Worldwide titles (3) ==
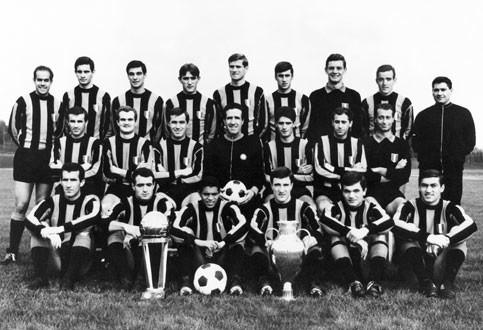
The Inter team which won the Intercontinental Cup in 1965

- Intercontinental Cup: (Note: Up until 2004, the main tournament to determine football clubs world champions was the Intercontinental Cup (also known as European/South American Cup and Toyota Cup); since then, it has been the FIFA Club World Cup.)

- Winners (2): 1964, 1965

- FIFA Club World Cup:

- Winners (1): 2010

- Intercontinental Supercup:

- Runners-up (1): 1968

== Friendly competitions (41) ==
Mundialito de Clubs
- Winners (1): 1981

Santiago Bernabéu Trophy
- Winners (2): 1993, 2001

Memorial Armando Picchi
- Winners (1): 1995
- Runners-up (1): 1971

Pirelli Cup
- Winners (11): 1996, 1997, 2000, 2001, 2002, 2003, 2006, 2007, 2008, 2009, 2010
- Runners-up (4): 1998, 1999, 2004, 2005

Valle d'Aosta Trophy
- Winners (1): 1998
- Runners-up (1): 2000

Birra Moretti Trophy
- Winners (3): 2001, 2002, 2007
- Runners-up (3): 1997, 1999, 2000

TIM Trophy
- Winners (8): 2002, 2003, 2004, 2005, 2007, 2010, 2011, 2012
- Runners-up (1): 2009

Ciudat de Palma Trophy
- Winners (1) : 2006

Bahrain Cup
- Winners (1) : 2007

Franz Beckenbauer-Cup
- Winners (1): 2008

Eusébio Cup
- Winners (1): 2008

Luigi Berlusconi Trophy
- Winners (1): 2015
- Runners-up (1): 1992

Marbella Cup
- Winners (1): 2017

International Champions Cup
- Winners (1): Singapore 2017

110 Summer Cup
- Winners (1): 2018

Casinò Lugano Cup
- Winners (1): 2019

International Super Cup
- Winners (1): 2019

Orange Trophy
- Winners (1): 2019

Lugano Region Cup
- Winners (1): 2021

Lugano Supercup
- Winners (1): 2022

Asahi Super Dry Trophy
- Winners (1): 2026
