= 2004 Marbella Football Cup =

2004 football (soccer) tournament

Tournament details
- Teams: 4

Final positions
- Champions: Borussia Mönchengladbach
- Runner-up: Borussia Dortmund

Tournament statistics
- Matches played: 4
- Goals scored: 9 (2.25 per match)

The 2004 Marbella Football Cup was held in January 2004 in Marbella, Spain. Four teams participated in tournament: two from Germany and one each from China and The Netherlands. This tournament was a predecessor to the Marbella Cup tournament.

== Teams ==
- (Germany) Borussia Dortmund
- (Germany) Borussia Mönchengladbach
- (Netherlands) FC Volendam
- (China) Shanghai Shenhua F.C.

== Match ==
Semi-finals
9 January 2004, 16:00
(Germany) Borussia Dortmund	5
(China) Shanghai Shenhua F.C.	1
9 January 2004, 20:00
(Germany) Borussia Mönchengladbach	3
(Netherlands) FC Volendam	0

Final
10 January 2004, 20:00
(Germany) Borussia Mönchengladbach (p)	0 (3)
(Germany) Borussia Dortmund	0 (2)
Third place
10 January 2004, 16:00
(Netherlands) FC Volendam (p)	0
(China) Shanghai Shenhua F.C.	0

== Winner ==
Winner of the 2004 Marbella Cup
Borussia Mönchengladbach
