= 2017 Marbella Cup =

2017 edition of association football tournament

The 2017 Marbella Cup was held on 3 January 2017 in Marbella, Spain.

Marbella and Internazionale finished the triangular tournament tied with four points, but Inter claimed the trophy on goal difference.

== Teams ==
- (Spain) Marbella
- (Spain) Linense
- (Italy) Internazionale

== Standings ==
- 3 points for a win, 0 points for a defeat
- 2 points for a penalty shoot-out win, 1 point for a penalty shoot-out defeat
- Internazionale won the trophy for the first time in history

Rank	Team	GP	W	PK-W	L	PK-L	GF	GA	Pts
1	(Italy) Internazionale	2	1	0	0	1	4	3	4
2	(Spain) Marbella	2	0	2	0	0	1	1	4
3	(Spain) Linense	2	0	0	1	1	2	3	1

== Matches ==
3 January 2017
18:00 CET

Marbella (Spain)	0–0	(Spain) Linense
Penalties
	9–8

Estadio Municipal de La Línea de la Concepción, La Línea de la Concepción
Referee: Francisco Saez Vidal

3 January 2017
19:00 CET

Linense (Spain)	2–3	(Italy) Internazionale
Chico 2'; Rubio 30' (pen.); Rulo (yellow card) 38'	Report	Murillo 16', 36'; Andreolli (yellow card) 29'; Gabriel 44'

Estadio Municipal de La Línea de la Concepción, La Línea de la Concepción
Referee: Francisco Saez Vidal

3 January 2017
20:00 CET

Marbella (Spain)	1–1	(Italy) Internazionale
Okoye 16'	Report	Perišić (yellow card) 19' (goal) 43'
Penalties
Alcibiade (penalty scored); Delmonte (penalty scored); Beitia (penalty missed); Sánchez (penalty scored); Márquez (penalty missed); Okoye (penalty scored); Diana (penalty scored)	5–4	Banega (penalty scored); Ansaldi (penalty scored); João Mário (penalty missed); Perišić (penalty scored); Icardi (penalty missed); Biabiany (penalty scored); Ranocchia (penalty missed)

Estadio Municipal de La Línea de la Concepción, La Línea de la Concepción
Referee: Francisco Saez Vidal

== Scorers ==
Rank	Name	Team	Goals
1	(Colombia) Jeison Murillo	(Italy) Internazionale	2
2	(Spain) Chico	(Spain) Linense	1
2	(Spain) Álex Rubio	(Spain) Linense	1
2	(Brazil) Gabriel Barbosa	(Italy) Internazionale	1
2	(Nigeria) Emmanuel Okoye	(Spain) Marbella	1
2	(Croatia) Ivan Perišić	(Italy) Internazionale	1
