= FC Dnipro =

Ukrainian football club

Dnipro
- Full name: Футбо́льний Клуб «Дніпро́» Football Club Dnipro
- Nickname: кораблі (The ships)
- Founded: 1918; 108 years ago
- Dissolved: 2019
- Ground: Dnipro-Arena, Dnipro
- Capacity: 33,993
- Owner: Ihor Kolomoyskyi
- President: Ihor Kolomoyskyi
- Latest manager: Oleksandr Poklonskyi
- League: Ukrainian Amateur League
- 2018–19: 8th, Group 3
- Website: www.fcdnipro.ua

Football Club Dnipro (Ukrainian: Футбо́льний Клуб «Дніпро́», romanized: [fʊdˈbɔlʲnɪj ˈklub d⁽ʲ⁾n⁽ʲ⁾iˈprɔ]) was a Ukrainian and Soviet football club based in Dnipro. The club played its last season in the 2018–19 Ukrainian Amateur League. The club was owned by Ukrainian businessman Ihor Kolomoyskyi.

In 2018, FC Dnipro was forced into bankruptcy by FIFA due to multiple legal claims for failing to pay the promised monetary compensation to players and managers. SC Dnipro-1 formerly existed as an unofficial successor.

The club was founded in 1918. During the Soviet era, the club was a member of the Soviet Volunteer Sports Society "Metallurg" (therefore it carried names Metallurg/Metalurh and Stal) and until 1961 was under sponsorship of the Petrovsky Dnipropetrovsk Metallurgical Plant. After that, the club was sponsored by the Southern Machine-building Plant Yuzhmash and carried both names, Russian Dnepr and Ukrainian Dnipro, while Dnepr was also used for international competitions. During the Soviet era, the club was the second most successful club, based in Ukraine, that participated in the Soviet Top League, winning in 1983 and 1988. After the fall of the Soviet Union, the club was privatized.

== History ==
=== BRIT ===
The club was formed in 1918 by the Petrovsky factory and was called BRIT (Brianskyi Robitnychyi Industrialnyi Tekhnikum). The team participated in the regional competition, the Katerynoslav championship. BRIT played its games in the "Sokil" stadium, a small venue located at the corner of Pushkin and Yuriy Savchenko streets, which it shared with four other clubs.

=== Petrovets – Stal – Metalurh ===
With the outbreak of World War I, BRIT was disbanded until 9 May 1925, when a new team was formed in Dnipropetrovsk. The team participated during the first season under the name Petrovsky factory, which was changed in 1926 to "Petrovets." The team entered the first Soviet competition under the name of Stal (steel) in 1936, participating in three championships before World War II. In 1947, the team re-entered the Soviet competition after merging with another club from Dnipropetrovsk, Dynamo Dnipropetrovsk. From 1949 until 1961, the team was called Metalurh ("metal worker"). From 1950 to 1952, it was relegated to amateur status due to poor results. In 1954, Metalurh Dnipropetrovsk reached the semi-finals of the USSR Cup, where it lost to Spartak Yerevan.

=== Dnepr or Dnipro ===
In 1961, the team was handed over to its new sponsor, the Yugmash (the Southern machine-producing factory), which at that time was one of the most powerful factories in the entire Soviet Union and was funded by the Ministry of Defense. It was part of the Zenit volunteer sports society. The new sponsor changed the team's name to Dnepr/Dnipro after the Dnieper River. For the All-Union competitions such as Soviet Cup and the Soviet Top League as well as the international competitions there was used Russian version of the name as the Russian was the accepted language of the Soviet Union and the Soviet government, while at republican level (within the Ukrainian SSR) Ukrainian version of the name was used. The team's performance did not change much until after 1968, when Dnepr obtained Andriy Biba and the new coach – Valery Lobanovsky. After that, it took the team three years to get promoted to the Soviet Top League and eventually finished in sixth place in 1972.

=== Golden generation ===
In 1973 and 1976, Dnepr reached the semi-finals of the USSR Cup. In 1978, the team was relegated to the lower league for two years. Their next return to the top flight was not as inviting as their first one and the team languished at the bottom of the table for several years. In the following years, the governing body of the team hired new promising coaches – Volodymyr Yemets and Hennadiy Zhizdik. After those changes, Dnepr became a strong contender for the Soviet championship winning it twice: once with Yemets and Zhizdik in 1983, and another one with Yevhen Kucherevsky in 1988. Also, in 1989 Dnepr became the first professional football club in the Soviet Union. During those years, the team featured many notable players such as Oleg Protasov, Hennadiy Lytovchenko, Oleksiy Cherednyk and Oleh Taran.

=== Ukrainian independence ===
Just before the collapse of the Soviet Union, in 1989 the club was transformed into a professional football club instead of the Soviet "team of masters", a process through which all Soviet teams of masters went through. The club joined the football federation of the native country and remained one of the top contenders in the newly formed Ukrainian Premier League. The team received a silver medal in 1993, as well as the bronze in 1992, 1995, 1996, 2001 and 2004. The team also reached the Ukrainian Cup finals in 1995, 1997 and 2004, losing all three to Shakhtar Donetsk. In the beginning of the 1990s the control of the club took over a native of Rivne Ihor Bakai with his "Respublika" corporation who earlier in the 1980s was governor of the SKA Karpaty Lviv training center, part of the Carpathian Military District. Bakai who invited Bernd Stange to Dnipro became first who hired foreign manager to head the former Soviet club. At that time Bakai was a member of the Verkhovna Rada (Ukrainian parliament) and a chairman of the Intergaz corporation which had exclusive rights of importing gas to Ukraine from Turkmenistan and in Ukraine was unofficially referred to as the "Gaz King". The experience of the former manager of East Germany national football team Bernd Stange in Dnipro was described in the biographic book that was published in Germany in 2004 "Trainer zwischen den Welten. Bernd Stange" (Coach between the Worlds. Bernd Stange).

During the summer of 1996 Dnipro initiated "repositioning" of its best players along with Bernd Stange to CSKA-Borysfen which in the previous season placed 4th just behind Dnipro. Among those players were Oleksandr Yevtushok, Viktor Skrypnyk, Serhiy Kovalets, Serhiy Mizin, Andriy Polunin, Serhiy Nahornyak, Volodymyr Sharan, Oleksandr Palyanytsya. However, just few day before the start of the 1996–97 season in Ukrainian Vyshcha Liha (Higher League), on the joint session of the Professional Football League (PFL) and the Football Federation of Ukraine (FFU), CSKA-Borysfen was taken away from its original owners and handed over to Mikhail Grinshpon ("Kiev-Donbass") connected with Semion Mogilevich. With the transfer of Dnipro players falling completely through, players ended up in danger of missing a season.

=== Success and downfall ===
On 14 May 2015, Dnipro qualified for the 2015 UEFA Europa League Final by defeating Napoli 1–0 in Ukraine after having drawn 1–1 in Italy, the first time in the club's history that it reached the final in a European competition. Despite going up 1–0 in the sixth minute against Spanish side Sevilla, Dnipro eventually lost 3–2. Despite the defeat, the match crowned one of the club's greatest seasons, during which Dnipro had to play all of their home matches some 400 kilometres away in Kyiv due to the conflict in eastern Ukraine. On 31 March 2016, the club was excluded by UEFA from participating in the next UEFA club competition for which it would otherwise qualify in the next three seasons (2016–17, 2017–18 and 2018–19) for violating the Financial Fair Play regulations.

In late June 2016, there were rumours that club owner Ihor Kolomoyskyi had stopped funding the club. Kolomoyskyi immediately denied this but did state, "The club will not exist in the same form as before;" and that it was "not normal to spend crazy amounts of money" to keep the current squad intact.

The 2016–17 season was disastrous for Dnipro. Due to outstanding debts owed to coach Juande Ramos and his staff, the FFU prevented Dnipro from signing new players other than free agents. On 26 October 2016, Dnipro was assessed a penalty of 6 points for the same reason. In April 2017, 3 additional points were deducted. At the conclusion of the 2016–2017 season, Dnipro were relegated directly to the Ukrainian Second League (third level) for the first time in club history.

In the 2017–18 season, the club with a new squad started well in the Group B of the Second League, for 13 matches in row going on high positions (second-fourth places). But the points have been deducted once more with their number reaching up to 18 until the end of the season, which resulted in club finishing on 8th place.

On 7 June 2018, FIFA decided to once more relegate the club and for the 2018–19 season the club was to play in the Amateur League. In the 2019–20 Amateur League the club did not participate. In 2019, some players, coaching, and managing staff joined SC Dnipro-1, particularly the whole coaching staff of Dnipro in full composition was appointed to the Dnipro-1's under-21 team.

On 22 February 2021, FIFA dismissed the claim of Jaba Kankava who appealed with a request to recognize SC Dnipro-1 a sports successor of FC Dnipro in order to recover his unpaid salary from FC Dnipro.

== Infrastructure ==
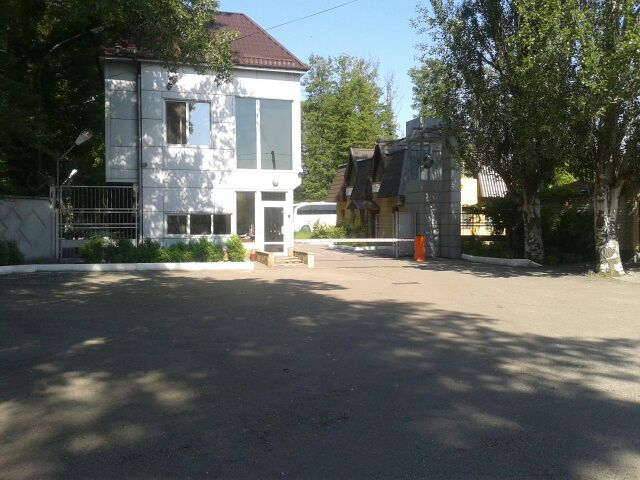
Admin buildings of the FC Dnipro training grounds

=== Reserves and the Academy ===
Soon after being promoted to the Pervaya Liga (Soviet First League), in 1971 FC Dnipro built its own training grounds in a remote neighborhood of Dnipro, Prydniprovsk. Until 1971, the senior team's reserves were based at the Yuzhmash resort "Dubrava".

=== Stadiums ===
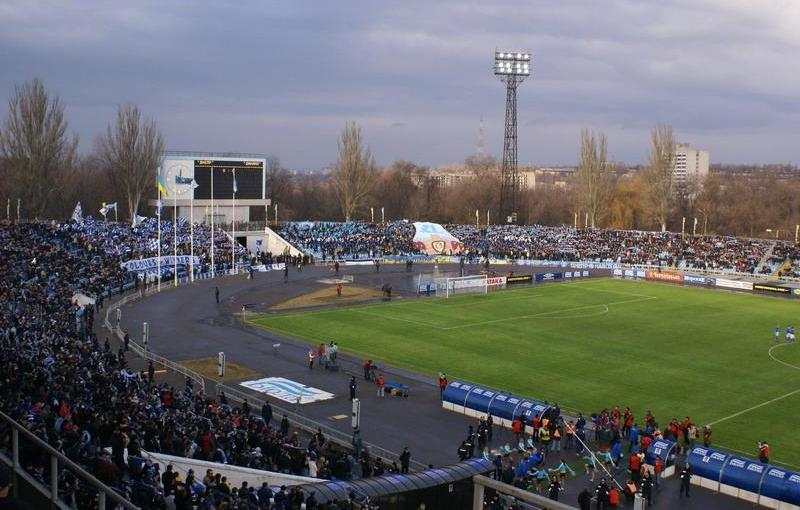
Old Meteor Stadium

Since 1966, Dnipro's home was Meteor Stadium in Dnipropetrovsk. Prior to that, the club played at the Metalurh Stadium (formerly Stal Stadium). Meteor Stadium was built by the Soviet rocket company Yuzhmash on the original site and has undergone several renovations since, the last one being in 2001. In 2002, however, after several spells in European competitions, it became clear that the club needed a new modern venue. Thus, in 2005, Pryvat Group started construction of Dnipro Arena in the centre of the city. The club played its last game at Meteor on 2 September 2008, against Metalist Kharkiv.

In April 2005, the club's new arena broke ground. It was constructed by Germany's largest construction company Hochtief. The construction itself took three years and four months, but a nine-month delay occurred due to a land dispute over a site where the stadium's car park was planned. The stadium's final capacity is 31,003 people and the initial estimated cost of the construction was set at €40 million.

The stadium was opened on 15 September 2008. The opening ceremony featured a speech by Ukrainian president Viktor Yushchenko, a concert performance by a number of famous Ukrainian musicians and two football matches: Veterans of Dynamo Kyiv vs. Spartak Moscow veterans, and Dnipro against Dynamo Kyiv. As a gift to the club from the city, the street that the stadium is situated on was renamed into Kucherevskyi Boulevard, in honour of Dnipro's late coach Yevhen Kucherevskyi. Dnipro played their first official game on 29 September 2008 against their local rivals Metalurh Zaporizhya, but Dnipro lost 1–2. They set a new attendance record for the Ukrainian Premier League 2008–09 season at 31,000 spectators.

Since the beginning of the Russo-Ukrainian War, Dnipro have played their European matches at the Olympic Stadium in Kyiv at the behest of UEFA, although there has been comparatively less conflict in Dnipropetrovsk than other areas.

== Supporters and rivalries ==
The first fan club in Dnipropetrovsk (today Dnipro) was officially registered by the city executive committee (ispolkom) on 25 July 1968. Before registration, the initiative group brought its draft of the fan's club statute and program to the regional committee of the Communist Party of the Soviet Union, department in control of development and propaganda of physical culture and sport in the region which imposed a resolution of approval with a signature, seal and date. Later the group met with the Dnipro head coach Leonid Rodos and his assistant.

The formation of the fan movement in Dnipropetrovsk began in the early 1980s, which saw the appearance of the first representatives of Dnipro ultras at the stadium. Later was established one of the largest fans unions – the Braty po Zbroyi (English: Brothers in Arms) – involving Dnipro, Dynamo Kyiv and Karpaty Lviv.

Most of the fans hold right-wing ideological views (Ukrainian nationalism). Dnipro is considered the third most popular club in Ukraine, and home and away matches are attended by large crowds. The largest Dnipro ultras groups are the Voice of the North Stand (Ukrainian: Рупор Північної Трибуни) and Ultras'83 (Ukrainian: Ультрас'83).

The most famous derby in eastern Ukraine is the Skhidne Derby (English: Eastern Derby) between Dnipro and Metalist Kharkiv. The game at the stadium is very hard and almost every game ends in a fight between football fans from Dnipropetrovsk and Kharkiv. There was also a city derby in Dnipropetrovsk between Dnipro and Kryvbas Kryvyi Rih. In May 2016, Metalist Kharkiv was removed from Ukraine's professional football leagues. Kryvbas Kryvyi Rih is, after its 2013 bankruptcy, an amateur club.

== Sponsors ==
=== Football kits and sponsors ===
Years	Football kit	Shirt sponsor
1998–2001	Adidas	TM Biola
2001–2005	Adidas	TM Biola
2005–2008	Umbro	TM Biola
2008–2019	Nike	TM Biola

- No information is known for the 2000–01 season.

== Home colours ==
1983	1988	1991	1992	1992	1993	2000	2000	2011	2013	2014

== Honours ==
=== Domestic ===
- Soviet Top League
  - (gold) Winners (2): 1983, 1988
  - (silver) Runners-up (2): 1987, 1989
  - (bronze) Third place (2) 1984, 1985
- Ukrainian Premier League
  - (silver) Runners-up (2): 1992–93, 2013–14
  - (bronze) Third place (7) 1992, 1994–95, 1995–96, 2000–01, 2003–04, 2014–15, 2015–16
- Soviet Cup
  - Winners (1): 1988–89
- Ukrainian Cup
  - Runners-up (3): 1994–95, 1996–97, 2003–04
- Soviet League Cup
  - Winners (2): 1986, 1989
  - Runners-up (1): 1990
- USSR Super Cup
  - Winners (1): 1989
  - Runners-up (1): 1984
- Football Championship of the Ukrainian SSR
  - Runners-up (1): 1936

=== European ===
- UEFA Europa League
  - Runners-up: 2014–15

=== Friendly ===
- Marbella Cup
  - 2011
- Costa del Sol Trophy
  - 2013
- Casino Marbella Cup
  - 2014
- AdF Diamonds Cup
  - 2014
- Sait Nagjee Trophy
  - 2016

=== Individual player awards ===
Several players have won individual awards during or for their time with Dnipro

Soviet Footballer of the Year

- (Soviet Union) Hennadiy Litovchenko (1984)
- (Soviet Union) Oleh Protasov (1987)

Ukrainian Footballer of the Year

- (Ukraine) Oleh Taran (1983)
- (Ukraine) Hennadiy Litovchenko (1984)
- (Ukraine) Oleh Venhlynskyi (2003)
- (Ukraine) Yevhen Konoplyanka (2010, 2012)
- (Ukraine) Ruslan Rotan (2016)

Ukrainian Premier League Footballer of the Year

- (Ukraine) Oleh Protasov (1987)
- (Ukraine) Mykola Kudrytsky (1989)
- (Ukraine) Yevhen Konoplyanka (2013)

== Latest squad ==
As of 30 October 2018

Note: Flags indicate national team as defined under FIFA eligibility rules; some limited exceptions apply. Players may hold more than one non-FIFA nationality.

No.	Pos.	Nation	Player
1	GK	UKR	Myroslav Znovenko
3	DF	UKR	Taras Horilyi
4	DF	UKR	Oleksandr Kulinich
5	DF	UKR	Serhiy Palyukh (captain)
6	DF	UKR	Oleksandr Andrushko
7	MF	UKR	Dmytro Verhun
8	MF	UKR	Ivan Budnyak
10	MF	UKR	Mykhaylo Mukhin
11	MF	UKR	Oleksiy Bandurin
12	GK	UKR	Maksym Luhovskyi
13	DF	UKR	Bohdan Hlebin
14	DF	UKR	Volodymyr Kirychuk
15	MF	UKR	Stanislav Batsman

No.	Pos.	Nation	Player
16	GK	UKR	Hlib Makarovskyi
16	DF	UKR	Mykyta Nechystenko
17	MF	UKR	Denys Soroka
19	FW	UKR	Vladyslav Shynkarenko
20	DF	UKR	Artem Dzhumyga
22	DF	UKR	Nazar Sydorenko
23	MF	UKR	Anton Rykun
24	MF	UKR	Oleksiy Karpovskyi
25	DF	UKR	Serhiy Zayets
26	MF	UKR	Daniil Shelayev
27	DF	UKR	Oleksiy Khyzhnyak
28	MF	UKR	Serhiy Nazarenko
32	MF	UKR	Danylo Krylov

== Notable players ==
National team players

Croatia

- (Croatia) Ivan Strinić
- (Croatia) Nikola Kalinić

Ukraine

- (Ukraine) Yevhen Konoplyanka
- (Ukraine) Dmytro Chyhrynskyi

Brazil

- (Brazil) Giuliano

Mexico

- (Mexico) Nery Castillo

== Coaches and administration (2018) ==
Administration	Coaching
President – Ihor Kolomoysky; General director – Andriy Stetsenko; Executive director – vacant	Head coach – Oleksandr Poklonskyi; Assistant coach – Volodymyr Bahmut; Assistant coach – Volodymyr Herashchenko; Assistant coach – Serhiy Nazarenko; Goalies coach – Mykola Medin

== Seasons scope ==
Tier	Years	Last	Promotions	Relegations
Top League (tier 1)	19	1991	6 times to Europe	▼1 (1978)
First League (tier 2)	26	1980	▲2 (1980)	▼1 (1949)
Gruppa G (tier 4)	1	1937	—	—
Ukraine (republican) (tier 3)	1	1950	—	—
45 years of professional football in Soviet Union since 1936

Tier	Years	Last	Promotions	Relegations
Premier League (tier 1)	26	2016–17	14 times to Europe	▼1 (2016–17)
Second League (tier 3)	1	2017–18	none	▼1 (2017–18)
Amateur League (tier 4)	1	2018–19	—	—
27 years of professional national football in Ukraine since 1992

== European history ==
FC Dnipro participates in European competitions since 1984 after playing its first against Trabzonspor. Since 2001, however, the club participates almost on annual basis with variable successes. This was interrupted in 2016, when, despite finishing third place, Dnipro was forbidden to play in the European competitions by UEFA.

Season	Stage	Notes
European Cup or UEFA Champions League
1984–85	Quarter-Finalist	eliminated by (France) Bordeaux 1–1 in Bordeaux, 1–1 in Dnipropetrovsk
1989–90	Quarter-Finalist	eliminated by (Portugal) Benfica 0–1 in Lisbon, 0–3 in Dnipropetrovsk
UEFA Cup or UEFA Europa League
2014–15	Finalist	defeated by (Spain) Sevilla 2–3 in Warsaw

== Presidents and owners ==
- 1992–1994 Debut-Fidav
- 1994–1997 Ihor Bakay (Intergaz)
- 1997–1998 Serhiy Tihipko (Privat Group)
- 1998–2019 Ihor Kolomoiskyi (Privat Group)

== Managers ==
- (France) Jules Limbeck (1936)
- (Russian Soviet Federative Socialist Republic) Nikolai Morozov (1956)
- (Ukrainian Soviet Socialist Republic) Valeriy Lobanovskyi (1969–73)
- (Ukrainian Soviet Socialist Republic) Viktor Kanevskyi (1973–77)
- (Ukrainian Soviet Socialist Republic) Yozhef Sabo (1978–79)
- (Ukrainian Soviet Socialist Republic) Volodymyr Yemets (1 July 1981 – 31 December 1986)
- (Ukraine) Yevhen Kucherevskyi (1 January 1987 – 22 March 1992)
- (Ukraine) Mykola Pavlov (19 March 1992 – 31 December 1994)
- (Germany) Bernd Stange (20 April 1995 – 30 June 1996)
- (Ukraine) Vyacheslav Hroznyi (1 July 1996 – 31 December 1997)
- (Ukraine) Vadym Tyshchenko (1 January 1998 – 5 October 1998)
- (Ukraine) Mykola Fedorenko (13 July 1999 – 11 October 2001)
- (Ukraine) Yevhen Kucherevskyi (1 January 2002 – 18 October 2005)
- (Ukraine) Vadym Tyshchenko (interim) (18 October 2005 – 19 December 2005)
- (Ukraine) Oleh Protasov (19 December 2005 – 29 August 2008)
- (Ukraine) Volodymyr Bezsonov (29 August 2008 – 18 September 2010)
- (Ukraine) Vadym Tyshchenko (interim) (18 September 2010 – 1 October 2010)
- (Spain) Juande Ramos (3 October 2010 – 22 May 2014)
- (Ukraine) Myron Markevych (26 May 2014 – 30 June 2016)
- (Ukraine) Dmytro Mykhaylenko (caretaker) (30 June 2016 – 30 June 2017)
- (Ukraine) Oleksandr Poklonskyi (30 June 2017 – End of season 2018/2019)
