= 2013 Marbella Cup =

3rd edition of the tournament

The 2013 Marbella Cup is the third edition of the tournament in Marbella Cup tournament is held in the Spanish resort of Costa del Sol.

== Participants ==
- (Brazil) Atlético Paranaense
- (Romania) Dinamo București
- (Ukraine) Dynamo Kyiv
- (Poland) Lech Poznań
- (Bulgaria) Ludogorets Razgrad
- (Romania) Oțelul Galați
- (Romania) Rapid București
- (Georgia (country)) Torpedo Kutaisi

== Match ==
Quarterfinals
(Romania) Dinamo București	3
(Poland) Lech Poznań	1
(Romania) Rapid București	1 (3)
(Georgia (country)) Torpedo Kutaisi	1 (4)
(Ukraine) Dynamo Kyiv	1
(Romania) Oțelul Galați	0
(Brazil) Atlético Paranaense	6
(Bulgaria) Ludogorets Razgrad	2

Semifinals
(Romania) Dinamo București	2
(Georgia (country)) Torpedo Kutaisi	1
(Ukraine) Dynamo Kyiv	0
(Brazil) Atlético Paranaense	1

Finals
(Romania) Dinamo București	0
(Brazil) Atlético Paranaense	1
Third place
(Georgia (country)) Torpedo Kutaisi	2
(Ukraine) Dynamo Kyiv	4

== Winner's ==
- (1) (Brazil) Atlético Paranaense
- (2) (Romania) Dinamo București
- (3) (Ukraine) Dynamo Kyiv

Winners of the 2013 Marbella Cup
Clube Atlético Paranaense
