= 2015 Marbella Cup =

Association football competition

The 2015 Marbella Cup was held in February 2015 in Marbella, Spain.

== Teams ==
- (Brazil) Clube Atlético Paranaense
- (Romania) FC Dinamo București
- (Sweden) IF Elfsborg
- (Russia) FC Lokomotiv Moscow

== Standings ==
Rank	Team	Match	Win	Draw	Loss	GF	GA	GD	Points
1	(Russia) FC Lokomotiv Moscow	3	2	1	0	3	0	+3	7
2	(Brazil) Clube Atlético Paranaense	3	2	1	0	4	2	+2	7
3	(Romania) FC Dinamo București	3	1	0	2	5	5	0	3
4	(Sweden) IF Elfsborg	3	0	0	3	1	5	0	0

== Matches ==
3 February 2015
18:00 CET

(Russia) FC Lokomotiv Moscow	1–0	(Romania) FC Dinamo București

Stadium San Pedro
3 February 2015
16:00 CET

(Brazil) Clube Atlético Paranaense	1–0	(Sweden) IF Elfsborg

Estadio Municipal de Marbella, Marbella
7 February 2015
15:00 CET

(Brazil) Clube Atlético Paranaense	0–0	(Russia) FC Lokomotiv Moscow

La Cala Golf
7 February 2015
19:00 CET

(Sweden) IF Elfsborg	1–3	(Romania) FC Dinamo București

Stadium San Pedro
9 February 2015
17:00 CET

(Romania) FC Dinamo București	2–3	(Brazil) Clube Atlético Paranaense

Estadio Municipal de Marbella, Marbella
10 February 2015
16:00 CET

(Russia) FC Lokomotiv Moscow	2–0	(Sweden) IF Elfsborg

Stadium San Pedro
