= 2011 Marbella Cup =

2011 Marbella Football Cup
Tournament details
- Dates: 2 February - 8 February 2011
- Teams: 8

Final positions
- Champions: FC Dnipro Dnipropetrovsk
- Runners-up: Polonia Warszawa
- Third place: Sparta Prague
- Fourth place: FC Zenit Saint Petersburg

Tournament statistics
- Matches played: 8
- Goals scored: 25 (3.13 per match)

Marbella Cup 2011 is a friendly football tournament held in Spain during the winter football break. The tournament takes place in Costa Del Sol. It mainly involves football teams from the Nordic and Eastern European countries. In tournament play 8-ht team's. The tournament is held in the period 2 to 8 February 2011.

== Teams ==
- (Poland) Polonia Warszawa
- (Russia) FC Kuban
- (Bulgaria) PFC Lokomotiv Plovdiv
- (Czech Republic) Sparta Prague
- (Russia) FC Zenit Saint Petersburg
- (Georgia (country)) FC Zestaponi
- (Romania) FC Timișoara
- (Ukraine) FC Dnipro Dnipropetrovsk

== Match ==
Quarterfinals
(Poland) Polonia Warszawa	4
(Russia) FC Kuban	0
(Russia) FC Zenit Saint Petersburg	2
(Bulgaria) PFC Lokomotiv Plovdiv	1
(Czech Republic) Sparta Prague	5
(Georgia (country)) FC Zestaponi	0
(Romania) FC Timișoara	1
(Ukraine) FC Dnipro Dnipropetrovsk	3

Semifinals
(Poland) Polonia Warszawa	1
(Russia) FC Zenit Saint Petersburg	0
(Czech Republic) Sparta Prague	2
(Ukraine) FC Dnipro Dnipropetrovsk	3

Finals
(Poland) Polonia Warszawa	0 (5)
(Ukraine) FC Dnipro Dnipropetrovsk	0 (6)
Third place
(Czech Republic) Sparta Prague	2
(Russia) FC Zenit Saint Petersburg	1

== Winners ==
- (1) (Ukraine) FC Dnipro Dnipropetrovsk
- (2) (Poland) Polonia Warszawa
- (3) (Czech Republic) Sparta Prague

Winners of the 2011 Marbella Cup
FC Dnipro Dnipropetrovsk
