= 2012 Marbella Cup =

2012 Marbella Football Cup
Tournament details
- Dates: 3 February - 9 February 2012
- Teams: 8

Final positions
- Champions: FC Rubin Kazan
- Runners-up: FC Dynamo Kyiv
- Third place: Guangzhou FC
- Fourth place: Lech Poznań

Tournament statistics
- Matches played: 8
- Goals scored: 25 (3.13 per match)

Marbella Cup 2012 is the second edition of the Marbella Cup tournament, the tournament is implement in the Spanish resort of Costa del Sol. The tournament is held in the period 3 to 9 February 2012 year.

== Participants ==
- (Russia) FC Krylya Sovetov
- (Russia) FC CSKA Moscow
- (China) Guangzhou FC
- (Russia) FC Rubin Kazan
- (Poland) Lech Poznań
- (Georgia (country)) FC Zestaponi
- (Romania) FC Timișoara
- (Ukraine) FC Dynamo Kyiv

== Match ==
Quarterfinals
1	(Russia) FC Rubin Kazan	5
2	(Georgia (country)) FC Zestaponi	1
3	(Poland) Lech Poznań	5
4	(Romania) FC Timișoara	0
5	(China) Guangzhou FC	1
6	(Russia) FC CSKA Moscow	0
7	(Russia) FC Krylya Sovetov	0
8	(Ukraine) FC Dynamo Kyiv	2

Semifinals
1	(Russia) FC Rubin Kazan	3
3	(Poland) Lech Poznań	1
5	(China) Guangzhou FC	0
8	(Ukraine) FC Dynamo Kyiv	4

Finals
8	(Ukraine) FC Dynamo Kyiv	1
1	(Russia) FC Rubin Kazan	2
Third place
5	(China) Guangzhou FC	0 (3)
3	(Poland) Lech Poznań	0 (5)

== Winners ==
- (1) (Russia) FC Rubin Kazan
- (2) (Ukraine) FC Dynamo Kyiv
- (3) (Poland) Lech Poznań

Winners of the 2012 Marbella Cup
FC Rubin Kazan
