= Léo Dubois =

French footballer (born 1994)

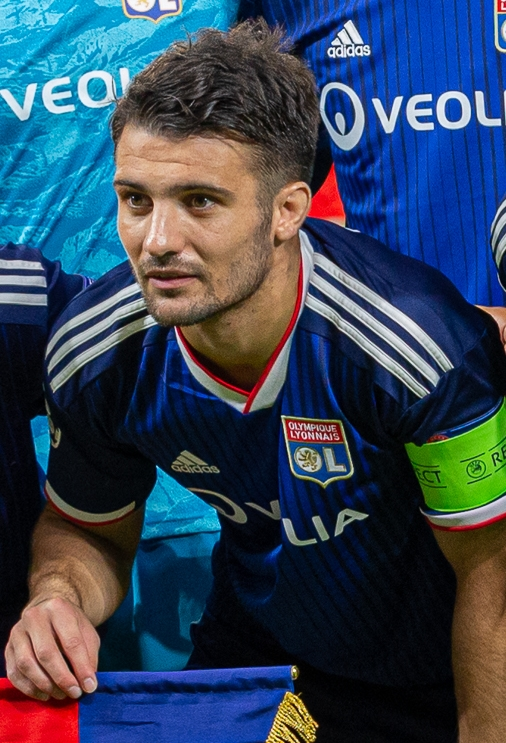
- Dubois with Lyon in 2019

Personal information
- Full name: Léo Michel Joseph Claude Dubois
- Date of birth: 14 September 1994 (age 32)
- Place of birth: Segré, France
- Height: 1.78 m (5 ft 10 in)
- Position: Right-back

Youth career
- 2000–2003: Saint-Gemmes d'Andigne
- 2003–2008: Ent. S. Segré
- 2008–2012: Nantes

Senior career*
Years	Team	Apps	(Gls)
2012–2016	Nantes II	40	(2)
2014–2018	Nantes	96	(3)
2018–2022	Lyon	101	(3)
2022–2024	Galatasaray	24	(1)
2023–2024	→ İstanbul Başakşehir (loan)	30	(1)
2024–2025	Eyüpspor	10	(0)
Total		301	(10)

International career
2016	France U21	2	(0)
2019–2021	France	13	(0)
Medal record
Men's football
Representing France
UEFA Nations League
Winner	2021 Italy
- * Club domestic league appearances and goals

Léo Michel Joseph Claude Dubois (French pronunciation: [leo miʃɛl ʒozɛf klod dybwa]; born 14 September 1994) is a French former professional footballer who played as a right-back.

== Club career ==
=== Early career ===
As a youth, Dubois trained with amateur sides Gemmois and ES Segré.

=== Nantes ===
Dubois eventually made the books of top division club Nantes and made his league debut on 9 May 2015 against Bordeaux in a 2–1 away defeat; replacing Kian Hansen after 83 minutes.

=== Lyon ===
Dubois joined fellow Ligue 1 club Lyon on 1 July 2018. Dubois signed a four-year contract with the club. On 27 September 2020, Dubois scored only his fifth ever Ligue 1 goal, in over 140 appearances, in a 1–1 draw with Lorient at the Stade du Moustoir. Dubois was named club captain by manager Peter Bosz in 2021 following the sale of Memphis Depay to Barcelona.

=== Galatasaray ===
On 21 July 2022, Dubois signed with Süper Lig club Galatasaray for a reported €3M. Dubois became the champion in the Süper Lig in the 2022–23 season with the Galatasaray team. Defeating Ankaragücü 4-1 away in the match played in the 36th week on 30 May 2023, Galatasaray secured the lead with 2 weeks before the end and won the 23rd championship in its history.

On 31 August 2024, it was announced that the contract between Galatasaray and Dubois was mutually terminated.

==== Loan to İstanbul Başakşehir ====
On 15 September 2023, he signed a one-year loan deal with fellow Süper Lig club İstanbul Başakşehir. He made his debut on 24 September against former club Galatasaray, scoring in a 2–1 defeat.

=== Eyüpspor ===
On 6 September 2024, Dubois signed with Süper Lig club Eyüpspor. On 7 November 2025, Dubois announced his retirement from professional football.

== International career ==
Dubois was called up to the France senior team for the first time in May 2019. He made his debut on 2 June 2019 in a 2–0 friendly win against Bolivia, coming on for Benjamin Pavard in the 46th minute of the game. 9 days later, Dubois made his first start for the France senior team and played every minute of the match, in the UEFA Euro 2020 qualifying 4–0 away win over Andorra.

On 10 October 2021, Dubois came on as a substitute in the 79th minute of the UEFA Nations League Final, a match France would go on to win 2–1 over Spain.

== Personal life ==
Dubois' father, Jean-Pierre, was born in Lebanon and was adopted at 13-months old by a French family. Following the 2020 Beirut explosion, Dubois launched a fundraising campaign to help rebuild the city.

== Career statistics ==
=== Club ===
As of match played 26 May 2024

Appearances and goals by club, season and competition
Club	Season	League			National cup (Note: Includes Coupe de France, Turkish Cup)		League cup (Note: Includes Coupe de la Ligue)		Continental		Total	
Club	Season	Division	Apps	Goals	Apps	Goals	Apps	Goals	Apps	Goals	Apps	Goals
Nantes	2014–15	Ligue 1	2	0	0	0	0	0	—		2	0
Nantes	2015–16	Ligue 1	24	0	2	0	1	0	—		27	0
Nantes	2016–17	Ligue 1	36	0	2	0	3	0	—		41	0
Nantes	2017–18	Ligue 1	34	3	1	0	0	0	—		35	3
Nantes	Total		96	3	5	0	4	0	—		105	3
Lyon	2018–19	Ligue 1	25	1	3	1	1	0	5 (Note: Appearances in UEFA Champions League)	1	34	3
Lyon	2019–20	Ligue 1	16	0	1	0	1	0	9	0	27	0
Lyon	2020–21	Ligue 1	37	2	3	0	—		—		40	2
Lyon	2021–22	Ligue 1	23	0	0	0	—		5 (Note: Appearances in UEFA Europa League)	0	28	0
Lyon	Total		101	3	7	1	2	0	19	1	129	5
Galatasaray	2022–23	Süper Lig	21	1	4	0	—		—		25	1
Galatasaray	2023–24	Süper Lig	0	0	0	0	—		2	0	2	0
Galatasaray	Total		21	1	4	0	—		2	0	27	1
İstanbul Başakşehir (loan)	2023–24	Süper Lig	30	1	1	0	—		—		31	1
Career total			248	8	17	1	6	0	21	1	292	10

=== International ===
As of match played 16 November 2021

Appearances and goals by national team and year
National team	Year	Apps	Goals
France	2019	4	0
France	2020	2	0
France	2021	7	0
Total		13	0

== Honours ==
Galatasaray

- Süper Lig: 2022–23

France

- UEFA Nations League: 2020–21
