= Mattias Hugosson =

Swedish footballer (born 1974)

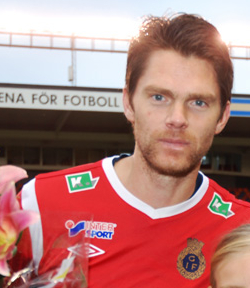

Personal information
- Full name: Erik Mattias Hugosson
- Date of birth: 24 January 1974 (age 52)
- Place of birth: Valbo, Sweden
- Height: 1.90 m (6 ft 3 in)
- Position: Goalkeeper

Youth career
- Valbo FF

Senior career*
Years	Team	Apps	(Gls)
1994–1995	Gävle GIK		
1996–1997	Forsbacka IK		
1998–2013	Gefle IF	438	(0)
2014	IFK Göteborg	0	(0)
2016	Gefle IF	0	(0)
2018	Gefle IF	1	(0)
- * Club domestic league appearances and goals as of 26 July 2023

Mattias Hugosson (born 24 January 1974) is a Swedish former footballer who played as a goalkeeper.

== Career ==
He came to Gefle IF in 1998 from Forsbacka IK. In 2004, he had the highest save percentage in Superettan as his team were promoted to Allsvenskan. During the 2011 Allsvenskan he kept a clean sheet for 699 minutes straight, the fourth longest time in league history. Hugosson played every single minute of the club's first 228 games in Allsvenskan after Gefle IF was promoted. He finally missed out on playing in the first round of 2013 due to fever. On 6 August 2014, he made a comeback as third-choice goalkeeper in IFK Göteborg. Signed in May 2016 by his longtime former team, Gefle IF as an emergency back-up when first choice Andreas Andersson suffered a serious knee injury.
