= Santy Ngom =

Footballer (born 1993)

Personal information
- Date of birth: 7 March 1993 (age 33)
- Place of birth: Le Mans, France
- Height: 1.82 m (6 ft 0 in)
- Position: Forward

Team information
- Current team: Beaumont SA

Youth career
- Le Mans

Senior career*
Years	Team	Apps	(Gls)
2010–2013	Le Mans B	23	(7)
2013–2014	Guingamp B	15	(4)
2014–2015	Paris Saint-Germain B	9	(1)
2015–2016	Levski Sofia	0	(0)
2016–2017	La Suze FC	36	(26)
2017–2019	Nantes B	16	(9)
2017–2019	Nantes	13	(1)
2019	→ Nancy (loan)	15	(2)
2019–2021	Caen	3	(0)
2019	Caen B	2	(1)
2022	Sète	16	(6)
2022–2023	Villefranche	1	(0)
2023	Stade Beaucairois		
2023–2024	Union Saint-Estève Éspoir Perpignan	10	(4)
2024	Prix-lès-Mézières	4	(0)
2024–	Beaumont SA		

International career
2018–2019	Senegal	3	(0)
- * Club domestic league appearances and goals

Santy Ngom (born 7 March 1993) is a footballer who plays as a forward for Régional 3 club Beaumont SA. Born in France, he played for the Senegal national team from 2018 to 2019.

== Club career ==
Ngom is a youth product of Le Mans. In December 2015, he joined Bulgarian club Levski Sofia, where he would go on to make zero league appearances. He then transferred to La Suze FC in the Championnat de France Amateur 2, and after a successful season, moved to the reserve side of Nantes. Ngom made his professional debut for Nantes in a 2–1 Ligue 1 win over Toulouse on 4 November 2017.

In January 2019, Ngom joined Nancy on loan. In August 2019, he signed for Caen on a three-year contract. He left the club in April 2021 after having made a total of three Ligue 2 appearances.

In January 2022, Ngom joined Championnat National side Sète. Seven months later, he signed for Villefranche.

On 11 July 2024, Ngom signed for eighth-tier club Beaumont SA.

== International career ==
Ngom was born in France, and is of Senegalese and Algerian descent. He made his international debut for the Senegal national team in a friendly 1–1 tie with Uzbekistan on 23 March 2018.
