= Marbella Cup =

Annual friendly football tournament in Spain

Marbella Cup Trofeo Casino Marbella
- Founded: 2004; 22 years ago
- Region: Andalusia
- Teams: 3 (2017)
- Related competitions: Costa del Sol Trophy
- Current champions: (Italy) Inter Milan (2017)
- Most championships: (Germany) Borussia MG (Ukraine) FC Dnipro (Russia) Rubin Kazan (Brazil) Atlético Paranaense (Romania) Dinamo București (Italy) Internazionale (1 title each)
- Website: marbellafootballcenter.com

The Marbella Cup (Spanish: Trofeo Casino Marbella) is an annual friendly football tournament held in Spain during the winter football break. The tournament takes place in Marbella, Andalusia. It mainly involves football teams from Brazil, Germany, Romania, Russia, Sweden, Ukraine, and Italy

== Prize money ==
In 2012 the winning team's prize money was 12,000 euros. Other prizes of 6,000, 3,500 and 2,500 euros were payable for earlier rounds.

== Winners ==
Season	Winner	Score	Runner-up	Dates
2004	(Germany) Borussia MG	0–0 (3–2 p)	(Germany) Borussia Dortmund	9–10 January 2004
2011	(Ukraine) Dnipro Dnipropetrovsk	0–0 (6–5 p)	(Poland) Polonia Warszawa	2–8 February 2011
2012	(Russia) Rubin Kazan	2–1	(Ukraine) FC Dynamo Kyiv	3–9 February 2012
2013	(Brazil) Atlético Paranaense	1–0	(Romania) Dinamo București	4–10 February 2013
2014	(Romania) Dinamo București	2–0	(Sweden) IFK Göteborg	3–6 February 2014
2015	(Russia) Lokomotiv Moscow	Group stage	(Brazil) Atlético Paranaense	3–10 February 2015
2017	(Italy) Inter Milan	Group stage	(Spain) Marbella	3 January 2017
