= 2014 Marbella Cup =

2014 Marbella Football Cup
Tournament details
- Teams: 4

Final positions
- Champions: (Romania) Dinamo București
- Runners-up: (Sweden) IFK Göteborg
- Third place: (China) Guangzhou Evergrande
- Fourth place: (Bulgaria) Lokomotiv Plovdiv

Tournament statistics
- Matches played: 4
- Goals scored: 14 (3.5 per match)

The 2014 Marbella Football Cup was held in February 2014 in Marbella, Spain. Four teams participated in the tournament, one from Bulgaria, one from Sweden, one from China and one from Romania. This tournaments was a predecessor of the current Marbella Cup tournament.

== Teams ==
- (Bulgaria) PFC Lokomotiv Plovdiv
- (Romania) FC Dinamo București
- (Sweden) IFK Göteborg
- (China) Guangzhou Evergrande FC

== Tournament Tree ==
Semi-finals
3 February 2014
(Romania) FC Dinamo București	2
(China) Guangzhou Evergrande FC	0
3 February 2014
(Sweden) IFK Göteborg	4
(Bulgaria) PFC Lokomotiv Plovdiv	0

Final
6 February 2014
(Romania) FC Dinamo București	2
(Sweden) IFK Göteborg	0
Third place
6 February 2014
(China) Guangzhou Evergrande FC	4
(Bulgaria) PFC Lokomotiv Plovdiv	2

=== Semi finals ===
3 February 2014	Dinamo București (Romania)	2–0	(China) Guangzhou Evergrande	Marbella, Spain
	Țucudean 1', 16'

3 February 2014	IFK Göteborg (Sweden)	4–0	(Bulgaria) Lokomotiv Plovdiv	Marbella, Spain
	Bojanić 29' (pen.); Vibe 31'; Engvall 74'; Augustinsson 81'

=== Third place match ===
6 February 2014	Guangzhou Evergrande (China)	4–2	(Bulgaria) Lokomotiv Plovdiv	Marbella, Spain
	Rong Hao 15', 86'; Elkeson 30'; Gao Lin 76'		Belaïd 53'; Mendes 70'

=== Final ===
6 February 2014	Dinamo București (Romania)	2–0	(Sweden) IFK Göteborg	Marbella, Spain
	Thicot 34'; Biliński 81'

== Goalscorers ==
2 goals

- (Romania) George Țucudean (Dinamo București)
- (China) Rong Hao (Guangzhou Evergrande)

1 goal

- (Poland) Kamil Biliński (Dinamo București)
- (France) Steven Thicot (Dinamo București)
- (Sweden) Ludwig Augustinsson (Göteborg)
- (Sweden) Darijan Bojanić (Göteborg)
- (Sweden) Gustav Engvall (Göteborg)
- (Denmark) Lasse Vibe (Göteborg)
- (Brazil) Elkeson (Guangzhou Evergrande)
- (China) Gao Lin (Guangzhou Evergrande)
- (Tunisia) Tijani Belaïd (Lokomotiv Plovdiv)
- (France) Joseph Mendes (Lokomotiv Plovdiv)
