= Estadio Municipal de Marbella =

Stadium in Marbella, Spain

Estadio Municipal Antonio Lorenzo Cuevas
- Interactive map of Estadio Municipal Antonio Lorenzo Cuevas
- Former names: Estadio Municipal Utrera Molina; Estadio Municipal de Marbella
- Location: Marbella, Spain
- Coordinates: 36°30′42″N 4°52′44″W
- Capacity: 7,300

Construction
- Opened: 1975
- Renovated: 2013

Tenant
- Marbella FC

Estadio Municipal Antonio Lorenzo Cuevas is a stadium in Marbella, Spain. It is primarily used for football. Spanish football team Marbella FC holding home matches at this stadium. The capacity of the stadium is 7,300 people. It is a venue for the Marbella Cup and Football Impact Cup, an annual friendly football tournaments.

Queen performed here on 5 August 1986 during their Magic Tour. This was their penultimate live show with Freddie Mercury. Exactly two years later, Michael Jackson performed in front of 28,000 during his Bad World Tour. In July 1990, Prince performed here on his Nude Tour.
