= Najib Gandi =

French footballer (born 1994)

Personal information
- Full name: Najib Gandi
- Date of birth: 23 June 1994 (age 32)
- Place of birth: Marseille, France
- Height: 1.88 m (6 ft 2 in)
- Position: Midfielder

Team information
- Current team: Hyères

Youth career
- 2002–2006: Saint-Marcel
- 2006–2008: SC Air Bel
- 2008–2010: Toulouse
- 2010–2017: Nantes

Senior career*
Years	Team	Apps	(Gls)
2012–2018	Nantes B	91	(11)
2017–2018	Nantes	5	(0)
2019–2020	Lyon-Duchère B	3	(0)
2019–2020	Lyon-Duchère	7	(0)
2020–2022	Aubagne	9	(2)
2022–	Hyères	6	(0)

International career
2012	France U18	2	(0)
- * Club domestic league appearances and goals as of 23:53, 20 April 2022 (UTC)

Najib Gandi (born 23 June 1994) is a French professional footballer who plays as a midfielder for Championnat National 1 club Hyères.

== Career ==
Gandi came through the youth system at FC Nantes. He signed his first professional contract with the club in December 2012. He went on to make five Ligue 1 appearances for the club in the 2017–18 season.

He quit football for a year after the death of his father and grandfather, leaving Nantes at the end of the 2017–18 season.

In June 2019 he signed a one-year contract, with the option of an additional year, with Lyon-Duchère.

In the summer of 2020, he gave up his professional status, took up a job in fashion and, once COVID-19 lockdown was over, signed for Championnat National 2 side Aubagne.
