= David Alcibiade =

French footballer (born 1991)

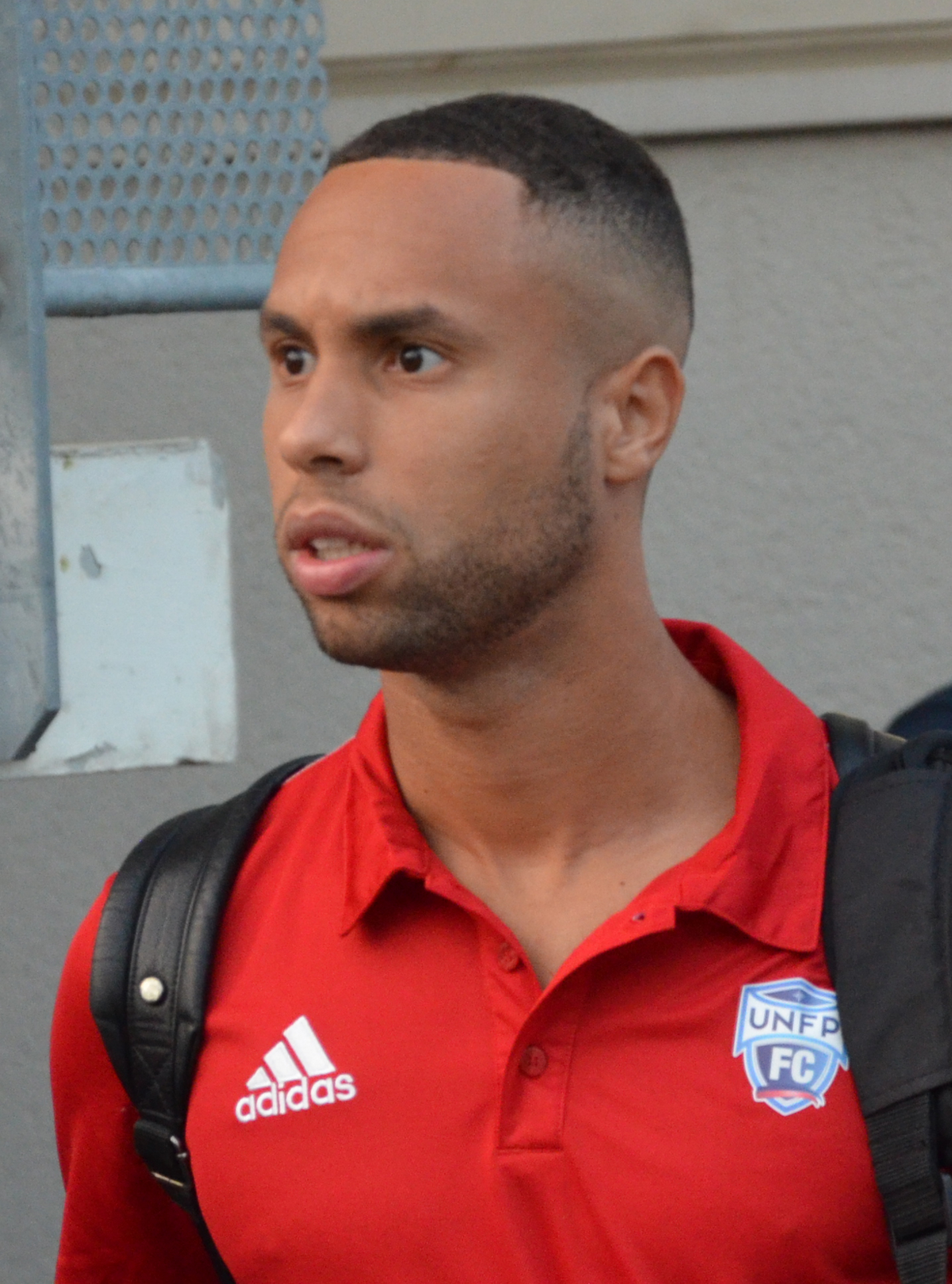

Personal information
- Full name: David Charles Alcibiade
- Date of birth: 26 September 1991 (age 35)
- Place of birth: Créteil, France
- Height: 1.85 m (6 ft 1 in)
- Position: Right back

Team information
- Current team: Saint-Malo

Youth career
- Créteil
- Clairefontaine
- Lille

Senior career*
Years	Team	Apps	(Gls)
2013–2014	Lille B	56	(0)
2011–2016	Nantes B	80	(2)
2012	Nantes	1	(0)
2016–2017	Marbella	3	(0)
2017–2018	Nantes B	6	(0)
2017–2018	Nantes	3	(0)
2019	Croix	0	(0)
2019–	Saint-Malo	4	(0)
- * Club domestic league appearances and goals as of 23:59, 19 October 2019 (UTC)

David Charles Alcibiade (born 26 September 1991) is a French footballer who plays as a right back for US Saint-Malo.

after Lille OSC in young, in professional he went through FC Nantes and Marbella FC then he signed with IC Croix in January 2019.
