= Water on Mars =

Study of past and present water on Mars

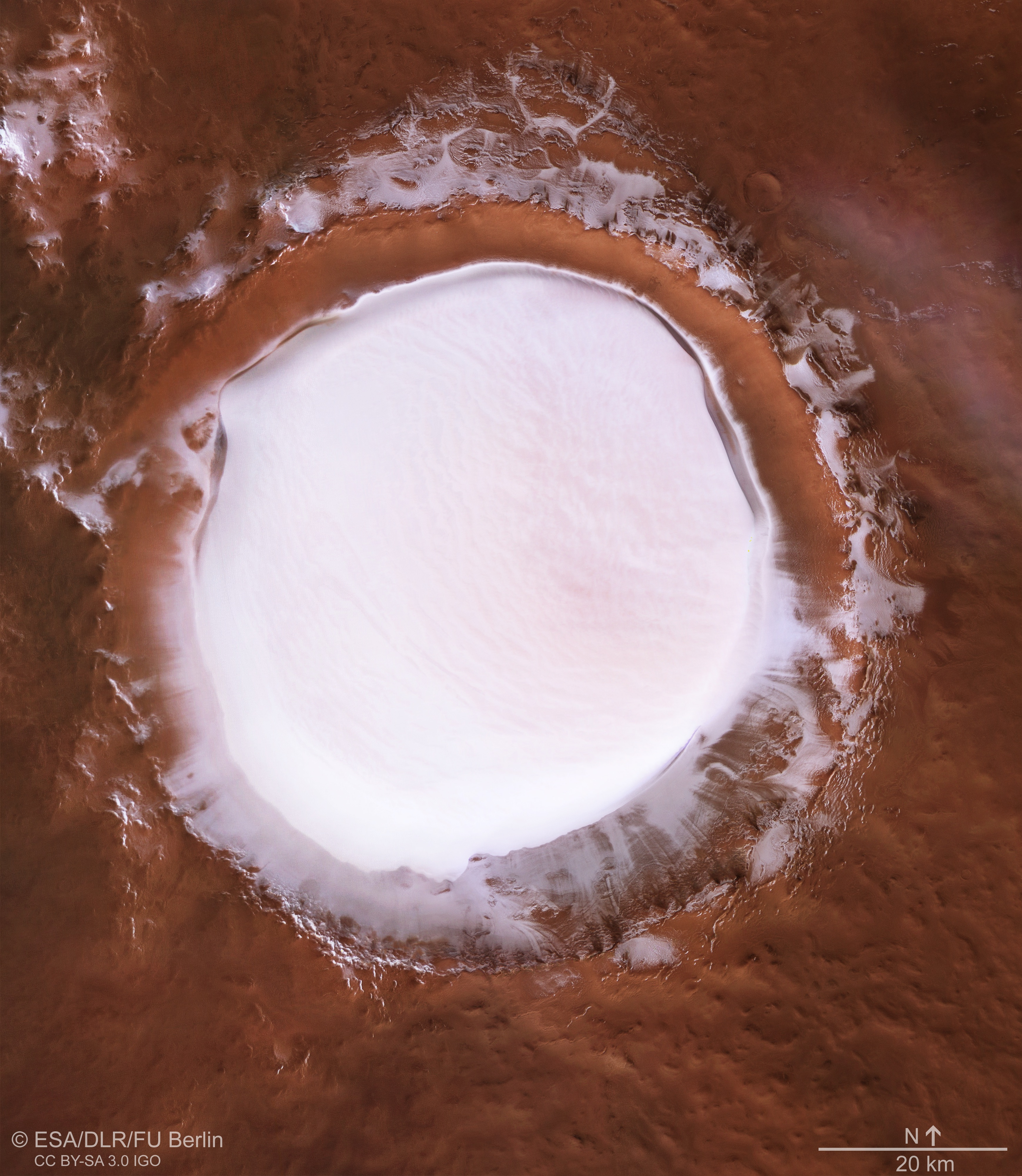
Mars contains water, though mostly as subsurface permafrost. Surface water is readily visible at some places, such as the ice-filled Korolev Crater, near the north polar ice cap.

Although very small amounts of liquid water may occur transiently on the surface of Mars, limited to traces of dissolved moisture from the atmosphere and thin films, large quantities of ice are present on and under the surface. Small amounts of water vapor are present in the atmosphere, and liquid water may be present under the surface. In addition, a large quantity of liquid water was likely present on the surface in the distant past. Currently, ice is mostly present in polar permafrost. More than 5 million km^{3} of ice have been detected at or near the surface of Mars, enough to cover the planet to a depth of 35 meters (115 ft). Even more ice might be locked away in the deep subsurface. The chemical signature of water vapor on Mars was first unequivocally demonstrated in 1963 by spectroscopy using an Earth-based telescope. In 2008 and 2013, ice was detected in soil samples taken by the Phoenix lander and Curiosity rover. In 2018, radar findings suggested the presence of liquid water in subglacial lakes and in 2024, seismometer data suggested the presence of liquid water deep under the surface.

Most of the ice on Mars is buried. However, ice is present at the surface at several locations. In the mid-latitudes, surface ice is present in impact craters, steep scarps and gullies. At latitudes near the poles, ice is present in glaciers. Ice is visible at the surface at the north polar ice cap, and abundant ice is present beneath the permanent carbon dioxide ice cap at the Martian south pole.

The present-day inventory of water on Mars can be estimated from spacecraft images, remote sensing techniques (spectroscopic measurements, ground-penetrating radar, etc.), and surface investigations from landers and rovers including x-ray spectroscopy, neutron spectroscopy and seismography.

Before about 3.8 billion years ago, Mars may have had a denser atmosphere and higher surface temperatures, potentially allowing greater amounts of liquid water on the surface, possibly including a large ocean that may have covered one-third of the planet. Water has also apparently flowed across the surface for short periods at various intervals more recently in Mars's history. Aeolis Palus in Gale Crater, explored by the Curiosity rover, is the geological remains of an ancient freshwater lake that could have been a hospitable environment for microbial life.

Geologic evidence of past water includes enormous outflow channels carved by floods, ancient river valley networks, deltas, and lakebeds; and the detection of rocks and minerals on the surface that could only have formed in liquid water. Numerous geomorphic features suggest the presence of ground ice (permafrost) and the movement of ice in glaciers, both in the recent past and present. Gullies and slope lineae along cliffs and crater walls suggest that flowing water may continue to shape the surface of Mars, although what was thought to be low-volume liquid brines in shallow Martian soil, also called recurrent slope lineae, may be grains of flowing sand and dust slipping downhill to make dark streaks.

Although the surface of Mars was periodically wet and could have been hospitable to microbial life billions of years ago, no definite evidence of life, past or present, has been found on Mars. The best potential locations for discovering life on Mars may be in subsurface environments. A large amount of underground ice, equivalent to the volume of water in Lake Superior, has been found under Utopia Planitia. In 2018, based on radar data, scientists reported the discovery of a possible subglacial lake on Mars, 1.5 km (0.93 mi) below the southern polar ice cap, with a horizontal extent of about 20 km (12 mi), findings that were strengthened by additional radar findings in September 2020, although subsequent work has questioned this detection.

Understanding the extent and situation of water on Mars is important to assess the planet's potential for harboring life and for providing usable resources for future human exploration. For this reason, "Follow the Water" was the science theme of NASA's Mars Exploration Program (MEP) in the first decade of the 21st century. NASA and ESA missions including 2001 Mars Odyssey, Mars Express, Mars Exploration Rovers (MERs), Mars Reconnaissance Orbiter (MRO), and Mars Phoenix lander have provided information about water's abundance and distribution on Mars. Mars Odyssey, Mars Express, MRO, and Mars Science Lander Curiosity rover are still operating, and discoveries continue to be made.

In August 2024, researchers reported that analysis of seismic data from NASA's InSight Mars Lander suggested the presence of a reservoir of liquid water at depths of 10–20 kilometres (6.2–12.4 mi) under the Martian crust.

== Historical background ==
The notion of water on Mars preceded the space age by hundreds of years. Early telescopic observers correctly assumed that the white polar caps and clouds were indications of water's presence. These observations, coupled with the fact that Mars has a 24-hour day, led astronomer William Herschel to declare in 1784 that Mars probably offered its inhabitants "a situation in many respects similar to ours."

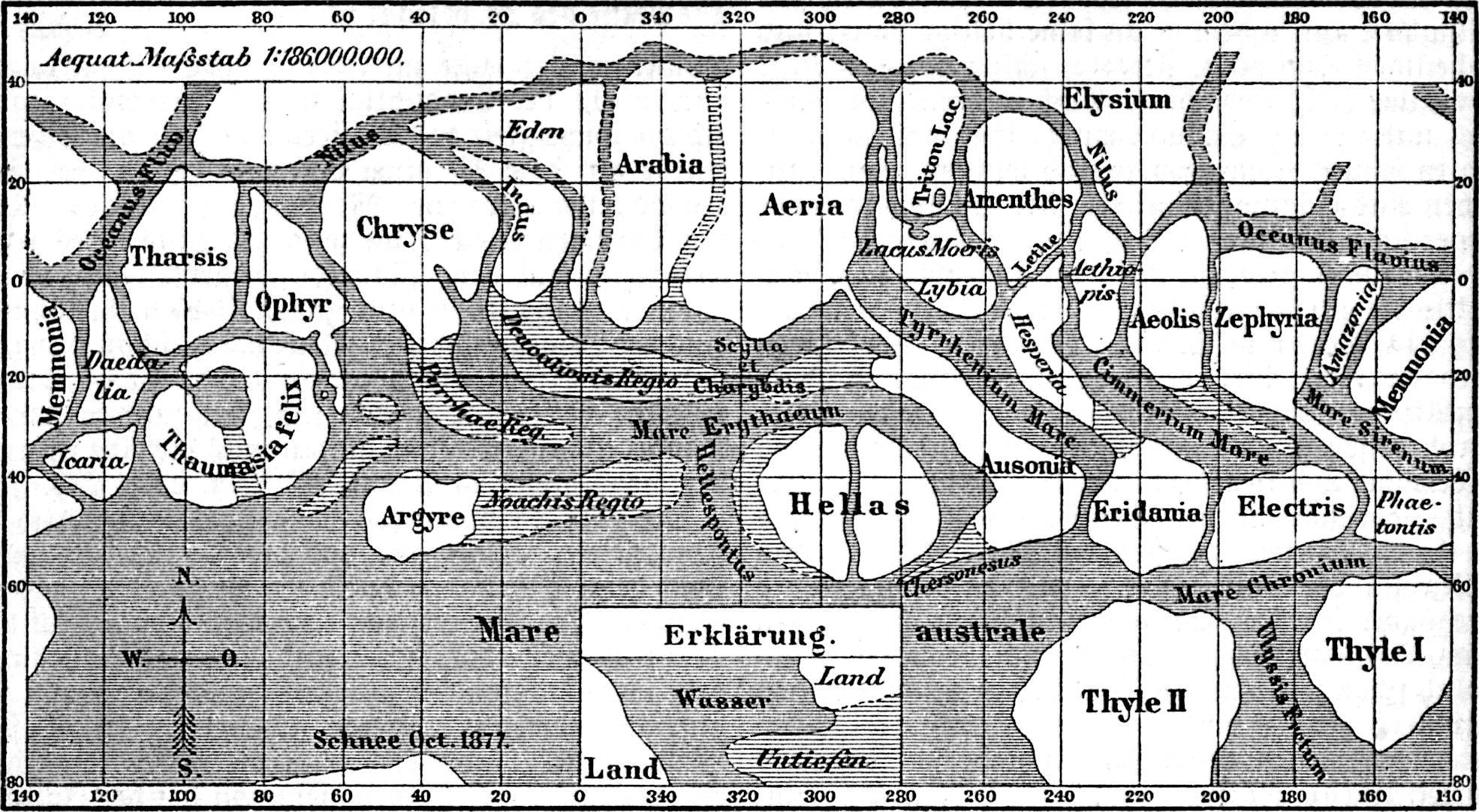
Historical map of Mars drawn by Giovanni Schiaparelli during the planet's "Great Opposition" of 1877.

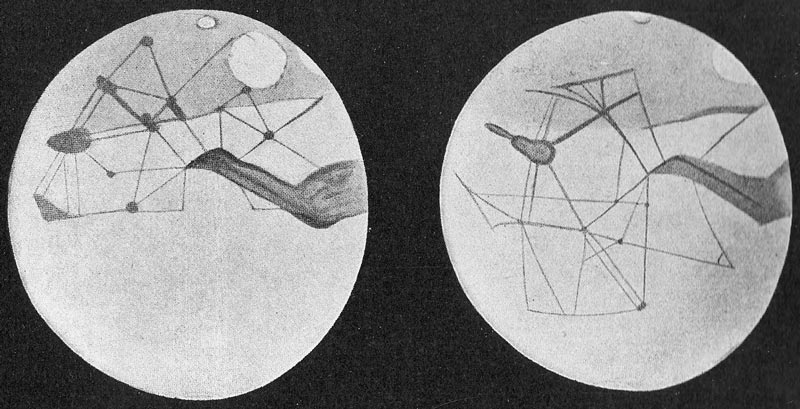
Mars canals illustrated by astronomer Percival Lowell, 1898.

By the start of the 20th century, most astronomers recognized that Mars was far colder and drier than Earth. The presence of oceans was no longer accepted, so the paradigm changed to an image of Mars as a "dying" planet with only a meager amount of water. The dark areas, which could be seen to change seasonally, were then thought to be tracts of vegetation. The person most responsible for popularizing this view of Mars was Percival Lowell (1855–1916), who imagined a race of Martians constructing a network of canals to bring water from the poles to the inhabitants at the equator. Although generating tremendous public enthusiasm, Lowell's ideas were rejected by most astronomers. The majority view of the scientific establishment at the time is probably best summarized by English astronomer Edward Walter Maunder (1851–1928) who compared the climate of Mars to conditions atop a twenty-thousand-foot (6,100 m) peak on an arctic island where only lichen might be expected to survive.

In the meantime, many astronomers were refining the tool of planetary spectroscopy in hope of determining the composition of the Martian atmosphere. Between 1925 and 1943, Walter Adams and Theodore Dunham at the Mount Wilson Observatory tried to identify oxygen and water vapor in the Martian atmosphere, with generally negative results. The only component of the Martian atmosphere known for certain was carbon dioxide (CO_{2}) identified spectroscopically by Gerard Kuiper in 1947. Water vapor was not unequivocally detected on Mars until 1963, at the Mount Wilson Observatory.

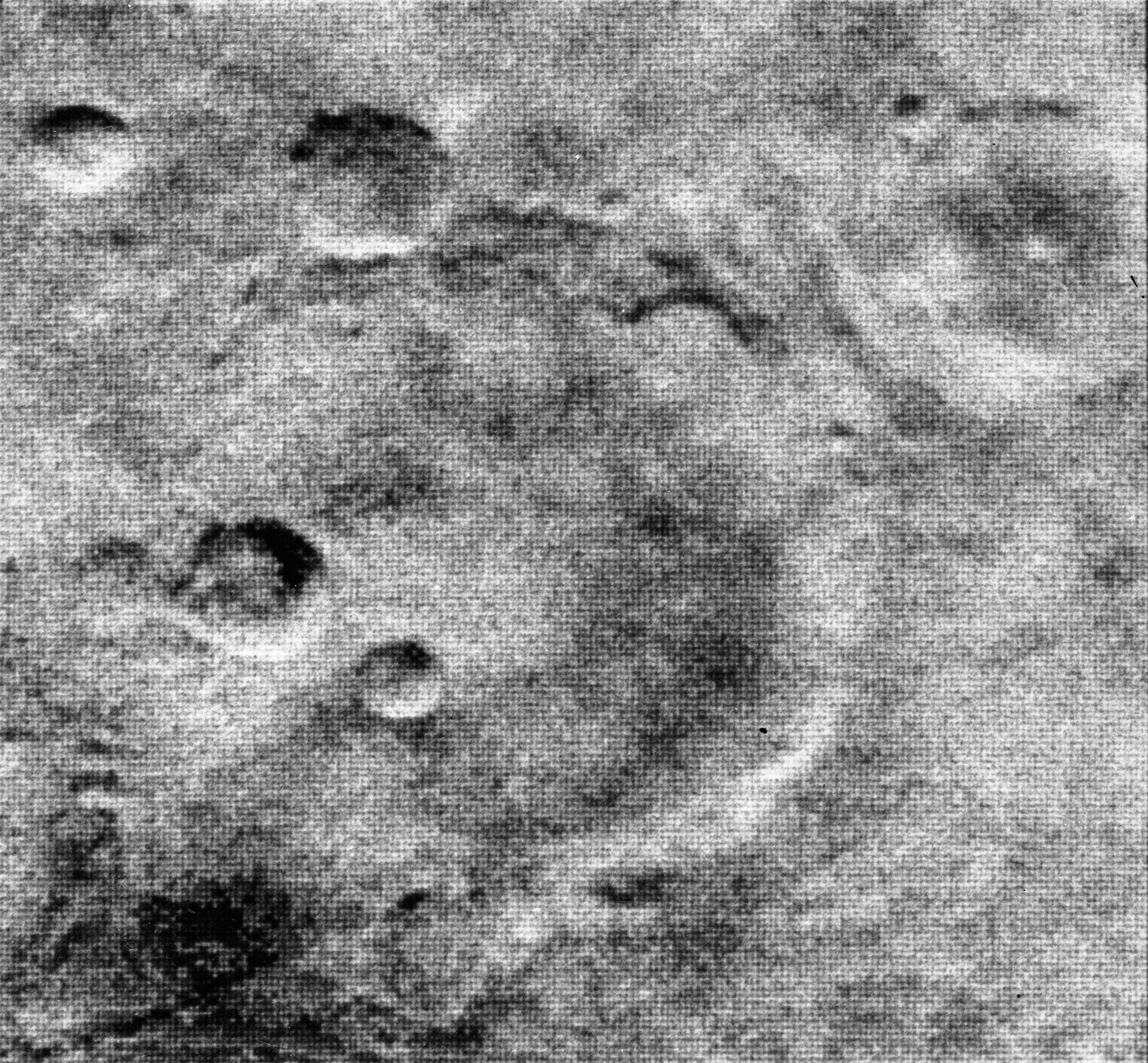
Mariner 4 acquired this image showing a barren planet (1965).

The composition of the polar caps, assumed to be water ice since the time of Cassini (1666), was questioned by a few scientists in the late 1800s who favored CO_{2} ice, because of the planet's overall low temperature and apparent lack of appreciable water. This hypothesis was confirmed theoretically by Robert Leighton and Bruce Murray in 1966. Today it is known that the winter caps at both poles are primarily composed of CO_{2} ice, but that a permanent (or perennial) cap of water ice remains during the summer at the northern pole. At the southern pole, a small cap of CO_{2} ice remains during summer, but this cap too is underlain by perennial water ice as shown by spectroscopic data from 2004 from the Mars Express orbiter.

The final piece of the Martian climate puzzle was provided by Mariner 4 in 1965. Grainy television pictures from the spacecraft showed a surface dominated by impact craters, which implied that the surface was very old and had not experienced the level of erosion and tectonic activity seen on Earth. Little erosion meant that liquid water had probably not played a large role in the planet's geomorphology for billions of years. Furthermore, the variations in the radio signal from the spacecraft as it passed behind the planet allowed scientists to calculate the density of the atmosphere. The results showed an atmospheric pressure less than 1% of Earth's at sea level, effectively precluding the existence of liquid water, which would rapidly boil or freeze at such low pressures. Thus, a vision of Mars was born of a world much like the Moon, but with just a wisp of an atmosphere to blow the dust around. This view of Mars would last nearly another decade until Mariner 9 showed a much more dynamic Mars with hints that the planet's past environment was more clement than the present one.

For many years it was thought that the observed remains of floods were caused by the release of water from a global water table, but research published in 2015 reveals regional deposits of sediment and ice emplaced 450 million years earlier to be the source. "Deposition of sediment from rivers and glacial melt filled giant canyons beneath primordial ocean contained within the planet's northern lowlands. It was the water preserved in these canyon sediments that was later released as great floods, the effects of which can be seen today."

== Aqueous and hydrated minerals ==
It is widely accepted that Mars had abundant water very early in its history. Minerals that incorporate water or form in the presence of water are generally termed "aqueous minerals". Hydrated minerals are minerals which have undergone a chemical reaction which adds water to their crystal structure.

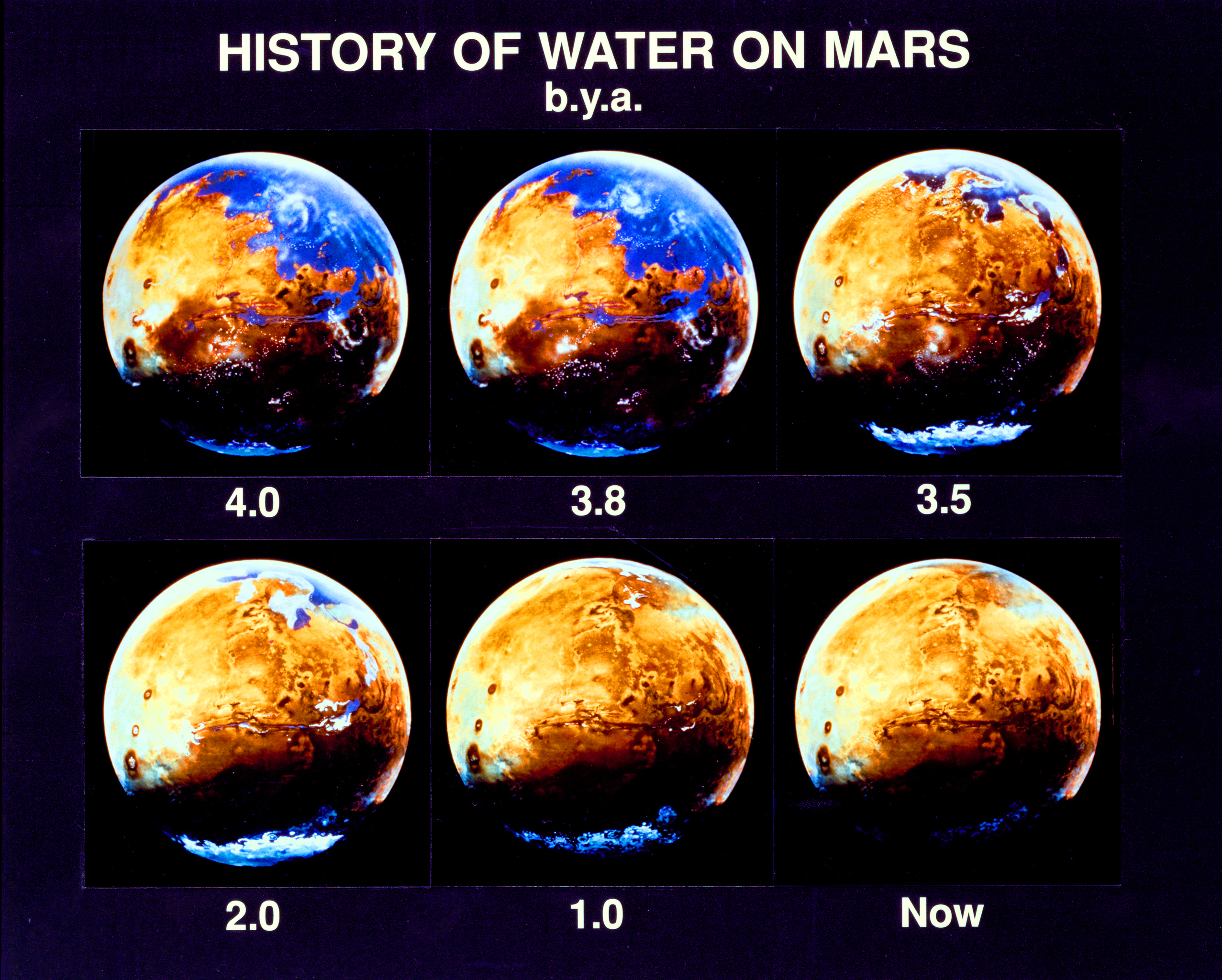
History of water on Mars. Numbers represent how many billions of years ago.

=== Water in weathering products (aqueous minerals) ===
The primary rock type on the surface of Mars is basalt, a fine-grained igneous rock which on Mars is made up mostly of the mafic silicate minerals olivine, pyroxene, and plagioclase feldspar. When exposed to water and atmospheric gases, these minerals chemically weather into new (secondary) minerals, some of which may incorporate water into their crystalline structures, either as H_{2}O or as hydroxyl (OH). Examples of hydrated (or hydroxylated) minerals include the iron hydroxide goethite (a common component of terrestrial soils); the evaporite minerals gypsum and kieserite; opaline silica; and phyllosilicates (also called clay minerals), such as kaolinite and montmorillonite. All of these minerals have been detected on Mars.

One direct effect of chemical weathering is to consume water and other reactive chemical species, taking them from mobile reservoirs like the atmosphere and hydrosphere and sequestering them in rocks and minerals. The amount of water in the Martian crust stored as hydrated minerals is currently unknown, but may be quite large. For example, mineralogical models of the rock outcroppings examined by instruments on the Opportunity rover at Meridiani Planum suggest that the sulfate deposits there could contain up to 22% water by weight.

On Earth, all chemical weathering reactions involve water to some degree. Many secondary minerals do not actually incorporate water, but still require water to form. Some examples of anhydrous secondary minerals include many carbonates, some sulfates (e.g., anhydrite), and metallic oxides such as the iron oxide mineral hematite. On Mars, a few of these weathering products could theoretically form without water or with scant amounts present as ice or in thin molecular-scale films (monolayers).

Aqueous minerals are sensitive indicators of the type of environment that existed when the minerals formed. The ease with which aqueous reactions occur (see Gibbs free energy) depends on the pressure, temperature, and on the concentrations of the gaseous and soluble species involved. Two important properties are pH and oxidation-reduction potential (E_{h}). For example, the sulfate mineral jarosite forms only in low pH (highly acidic) water. Phyllosilicates usually form in water of neutral to high pH (alkaline). E_{h} is a measure of the oxidation state of an aqueous system. Together E_{h} and pH indicate the types of minerals that are thermodynamically most stable and therefore most likely to form from a given set of aqueous components. Thus, past environmental conditions on Mars, including those conducive to life, can be inferred from the types of minerals present in the rocks.

=== Hydrothermal alteration ===
Aqueous minerals can also form in the subsurface by hydrothermal fluids migrating through pores and fissures. The heat source driving a hydrothermal system may be nearby magma bodies or residual heat from large impacts. One important type of hydrothermal alteration in the Earth's oceanic crust is serpentinization, which occurs when seawater migrates through ultramafic and basaltic rocks. The water-rock reactions result in the oxidation of ferrous iron in olivine and pyroxene to produce ferric iron (as the mineral magnetite) yielding molecular hydrogen (H_{2}) as a byproduct. The process creates a highly alkaline and reducing (low Eh) environment favoring the formation of certain phyllosilicates (serpentine minerals) and various carbonate minerals, which together form a rock called serpentinite. The hydrogen gas produced can be an important energy source for chemosynthetic organisms or it can react with CO_{2} to produce methane gas, a process that has been considered as a non-biological source for the trace amounts of methane reported in the Martian atmosphere. Serpentine minerals can also store a lot of water (as hydroxyl) in their crystal structure. A recent study has argued that hypothetical serpentinites in the ancient highland crust of Mars could hold as much as a 500 metres (1,600 ft)-thick global equivalent layer (GEL) of water. Although some serpentine minerals have been detected on Mars, no widespread outcroppings are evident from remote sensing data. This fact does not preclude the presence of large amounts of serpentinite hidden at depth in the Martian crust.

=== Weathering rates ===
The rates at which primary minerals convert to secondary aqueous minerals vary. Primary silicate minerals crystallize from magma under pressures and temperatures vastly higher than conditions at the surface of a planet. When exposed to a surface environment these minerals are out of equilibrium and will tend to interact with available chemical components to form more stable mineral phases. In general, the silicate minerals that crystallize at the highest temperatures (solidify first in a cooling magma) weather the most rapidly. On Earth and Mars, the most common mineral to meet this criterion is olivine, which readily weathers to clay minerals in the presence of water. Olivine is widespread on Mars, suggesting that Mars's surface has not been pervasively altered by water; abundant geological evidence suggests otherwise.

=== Martian meteorites ===
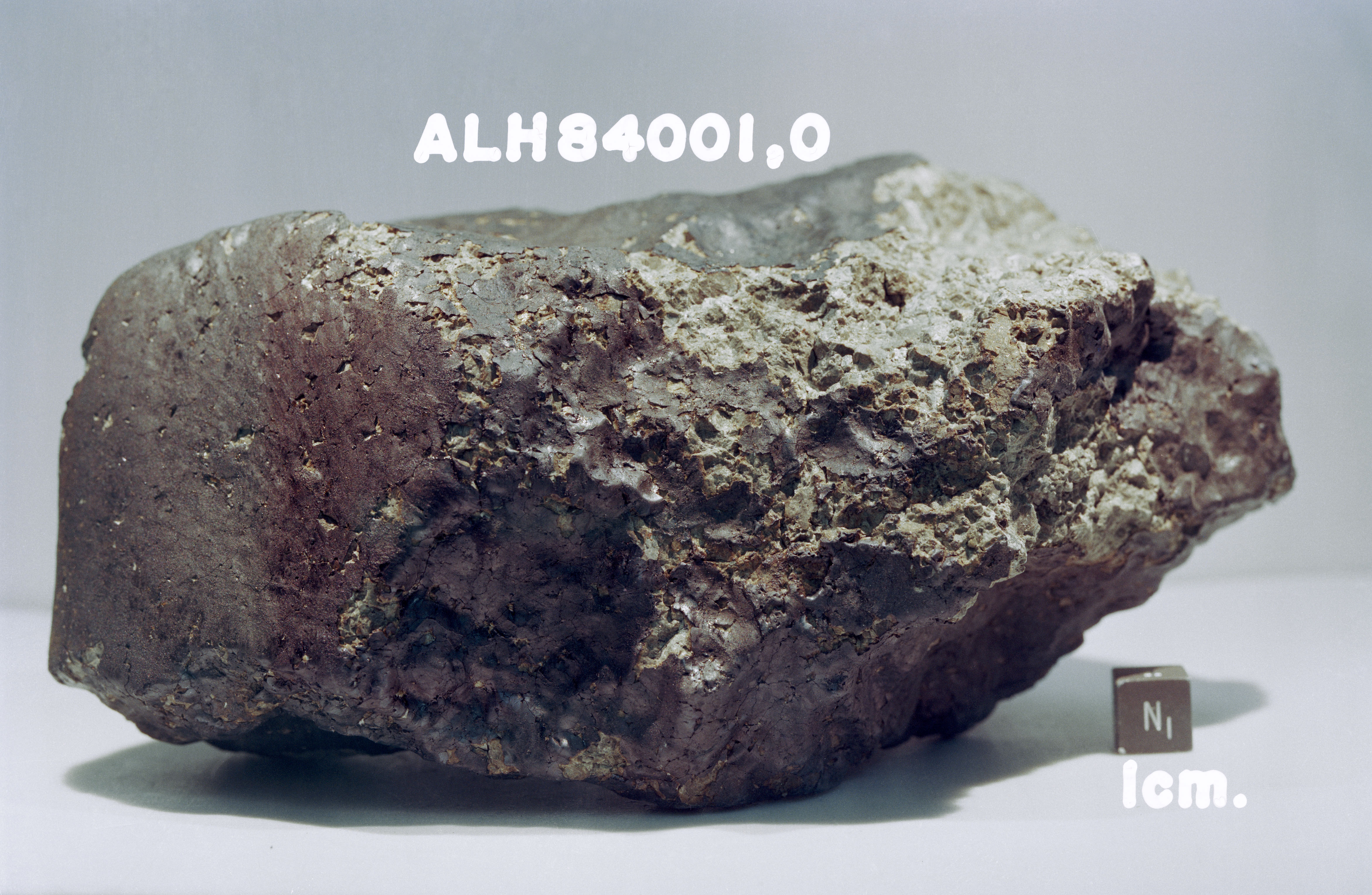
Mars meteorite ALH84001.

Over 60 meteorites have been found that came from Mars. Some of them contain evidence that they were exposed to water when on Mars. Some Martian meteorites called basaltic shergottites, appear (from the presence of hydrated carbonates and sulfates) to have been exposed to liquid water prior to ejection into space. It has been shown that another class of meteorites, the nakhlites, were suffused with liquid water around 620 million years ago and that they were ejected from Mars around 10.75 million years ago by an asteroid impact. They fell to Earth within the last 10,000 years. Martian meteorite NWA 7034 has one order of magnitude more water than most other Martian meteorites. It is similar to the basalts studied by rover missions, and it was formed in the early Amazonian epoch.

In 1996, scientists reported the possible presence of microfossils in the Allan Hills 84001, a meteorite from Mars, which would have been strong evidence for ancient life on Mars. However, the current scientific consensus is that this meteorite does not contain evidence for life.

== Geomorphic evidence for ancient liquid water ==
=== Lakes and river valleys ===
The 1971 Mariner 9 spacecraft caused a revolution in our ideas about water on Mars because the images it took showed ancient river beds. Huge ancient river valleys were found in many areas. Images showed evidence that in the distant past, floods of water broke through dams, carved deep valleys, eroded grooves into bedrock, and traveled thousands of kilometers. Areas of branched streambeds, in the southern hemisphere, suggested that rain once fell. The number of recognised valleys has increased through time. Research published in June 2010 mapped 40,000 river valleys on Mars, roughly quadrupling the number of river valleys that had previously been identified. Martian water-worn features can be classified into two distinct classes: 1) dendritic (branched), terrestrial-scale, widely distributed, Noachian-age valley networks and 2) exceptionally large, long, single-thread, isolated, Hesperian-age outflow channels. Recent work suggests that there may also be a class of currently enigmatic, smaller, younger (Hesperian to Amazonian) channels in the mid-latitudes, perhaps associated with the occasional local melting of ice deposits.

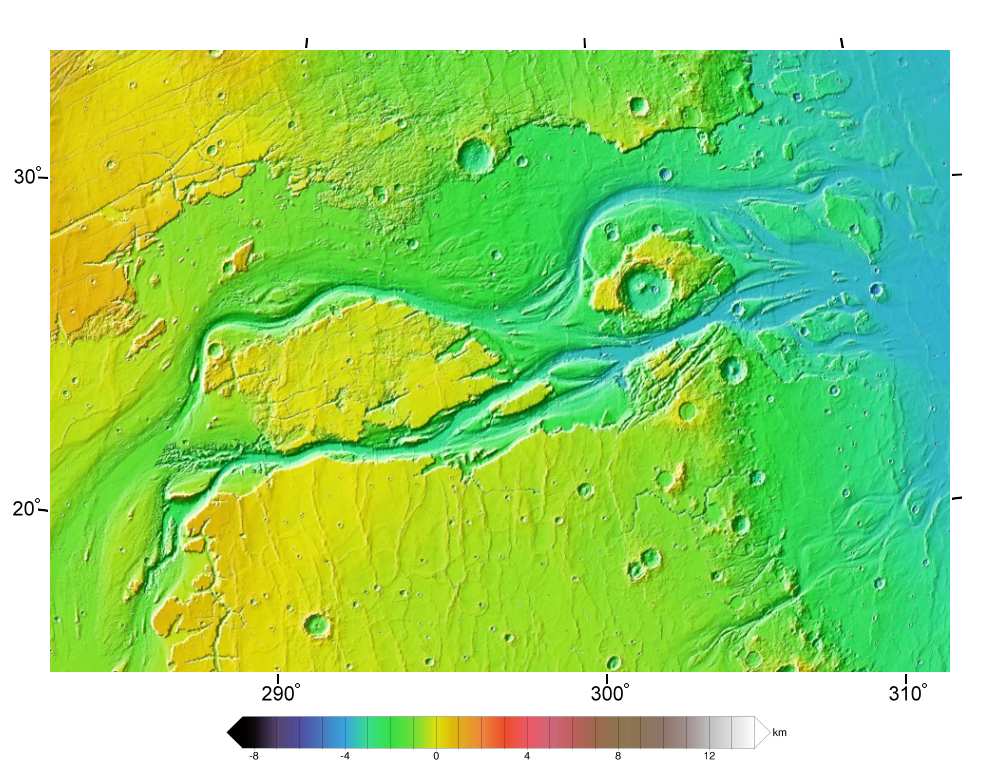
Kasei Valles—a major outflow channel—seen in MOLA elevation data. Flow was from bottom left to right. Image is approx. 1600 km across. The channel system extends another 1200 km south of this image to Echus Chasma.

Some parts of Mars show inverted relief, which is created in the following way. First, sediments are deposited on the floor of a stream and then become resistant to erosion by forming cements made of calcite or iron oxides. Eventually, physical or chemical processes remove the surrounding weaker materials and the former streambeds become visible since they are resistant to these processes. Mars Global Surveyor found several examples of this process. Many inverted streams have been discovered in various regions of Mars, especially in the Medusae Fossae Formation, Miyamoto Crater, Saheki Crater, and the Juventae Plateau.

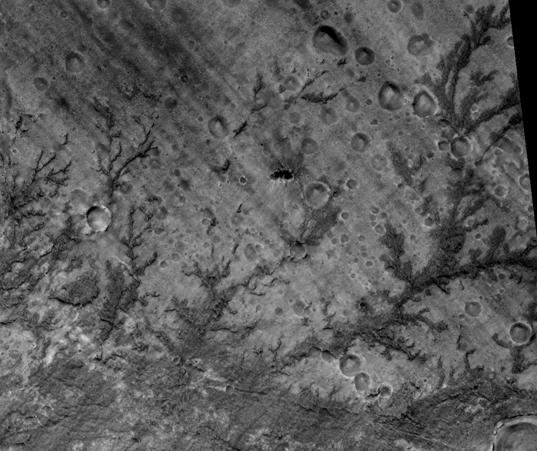
Inverted stream channels in Antoniadi Crater. Location is Syrtis Major quadrangle.

A variety of lake basins have been discovered on Mars. Some are comparable in size to the largest lakes on Earth, such as the Caspian Sea, Black Sea, and Lake Baikal. Lakes that were fed by valley networks are found in the southern highlands. There are places that are closed depressions with river valleys leading into them. These areas are thought to have once contained lakes; one is in Terra Sirenum that had its overflow move through Ma'adim Vallis into Gusev Crater, explored by the Mars Exploration Rover Spirit. Another is near Parana Valles and Loire Vallis. Some lakes are thought to have formed by precipitation, while others were formed from groundwater. Lakes are estimated to have existed in the Argyre basin, the Hellas basin, and maybe in Valles Marineris. It is likely that at times in the Noachian, many craters hosted lakes. These lakes are consistent with a cold, dry (by Earth standards) hydrological environment somewhat like that of the Great Basin of the western USA during the Last Glacial Maximum.

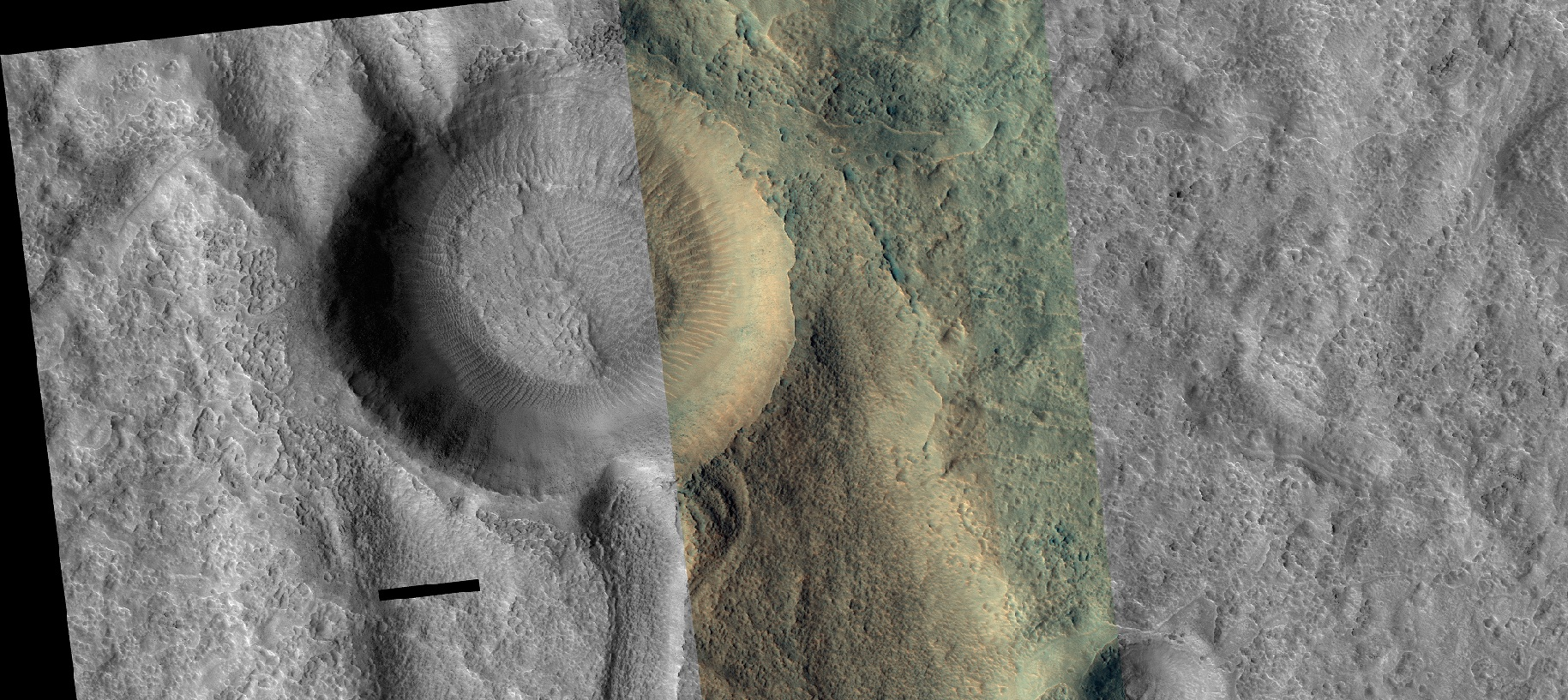
Open crater lake--it has both an inlet and outflow channel. Over 200 craters on Mars once held lakes. Location is Hellas quadrangle.

Research from 2010 suggests that Mars also had lakes along parts of the equator. Although earlier research had shown that Mars had a warm and wet early history that has long since dried up, these lakes existed in the Hesperian Epoch, a much later period. Using detailed images from NASA's Mars Reconnaissance Orbiter, the researchers speculate that there may have been increased volcanic activity, meteorite impacts or shifts in Mars's orbit during this period to warm Mars's atmosphere enough to melt the abundant ice present in the ground. Volcanoes may have released gases that thickened the atmosphere for a temporary period, trapping more sunlight and making it warm enough for liquid water to exist. In this study, channels were discovered that connected lake basins near Ares Vallis. When one lake filled up, its waters overflowed the banks and carved the channels to a lower area where another lake would form. These dry lakes would be targets to look for evidence (biosignatures) of past life.

In 2012, NASA scientists announced that the Curiosity rover found evidence for an ancient streambed in Gale Crater, suggesting an ancient "vigorous flow" of water on Mars. In particular, analysis of the now dry streambed indicated that the water ran at 3.3 km/h (0.92 m/s), possibly at hip-depth. Proof of running water came in the form of rounded pebbles and gravel fragments that could have only been weathered by strong liquid currents. Their shape and orientation suggests long-distance transport from above the rim of the crater, where a channel named Peace Vallis feeds into the alluvial fan.

Eridania Lake is a theorized ancient lake with a surface area of roughly 1.1 million square kilometers. Its maximum depth would have been 2,400 meters and its volume would have been 562,000 km^{3}. It was larger than the largest landlocked sea on Earth, the Caspian Sea, and contained more water than all the other Martian lakes together. The Eridania sea held more than nine times as much water as all of North America's Great Lakes. The upper surface of the lake was assumed to be at the elevation of valley networks that surround the lake; they all end at the same elevation, suggesting that they emptied into a lake. Research on this basin with CRISM found thick deposits, greater than 400 meters thick, that contained the minerals saponite, talc-saponite, Fe-rich mica (for example, glauconite-nontronite), Fe- and Mg-serpentine, Mg-Fe-Ca-carbonate and probable Fe-sulfide. The Fe-sulfide probably formed in deep water from water heated by volcanoes. Such a process, classified as hydrothermal may have been a place where life on Earth began.

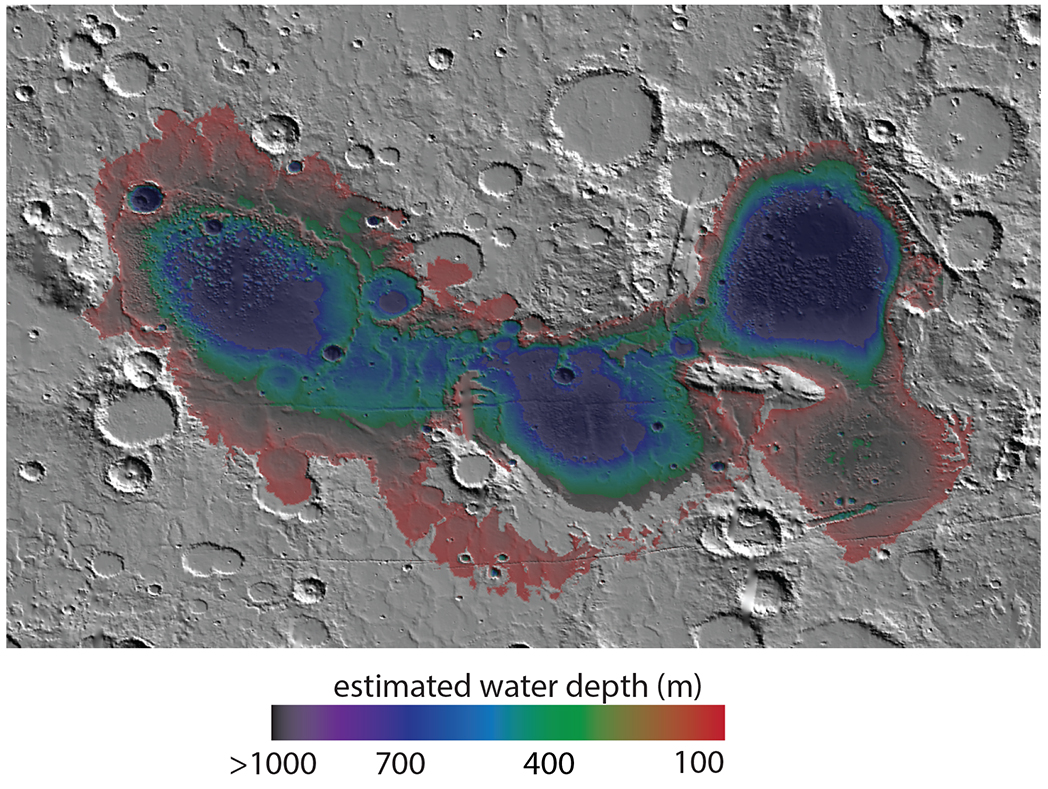
Map showing estimated water depth in different parts of Eridania Sea.
This map is about 530 miles across.

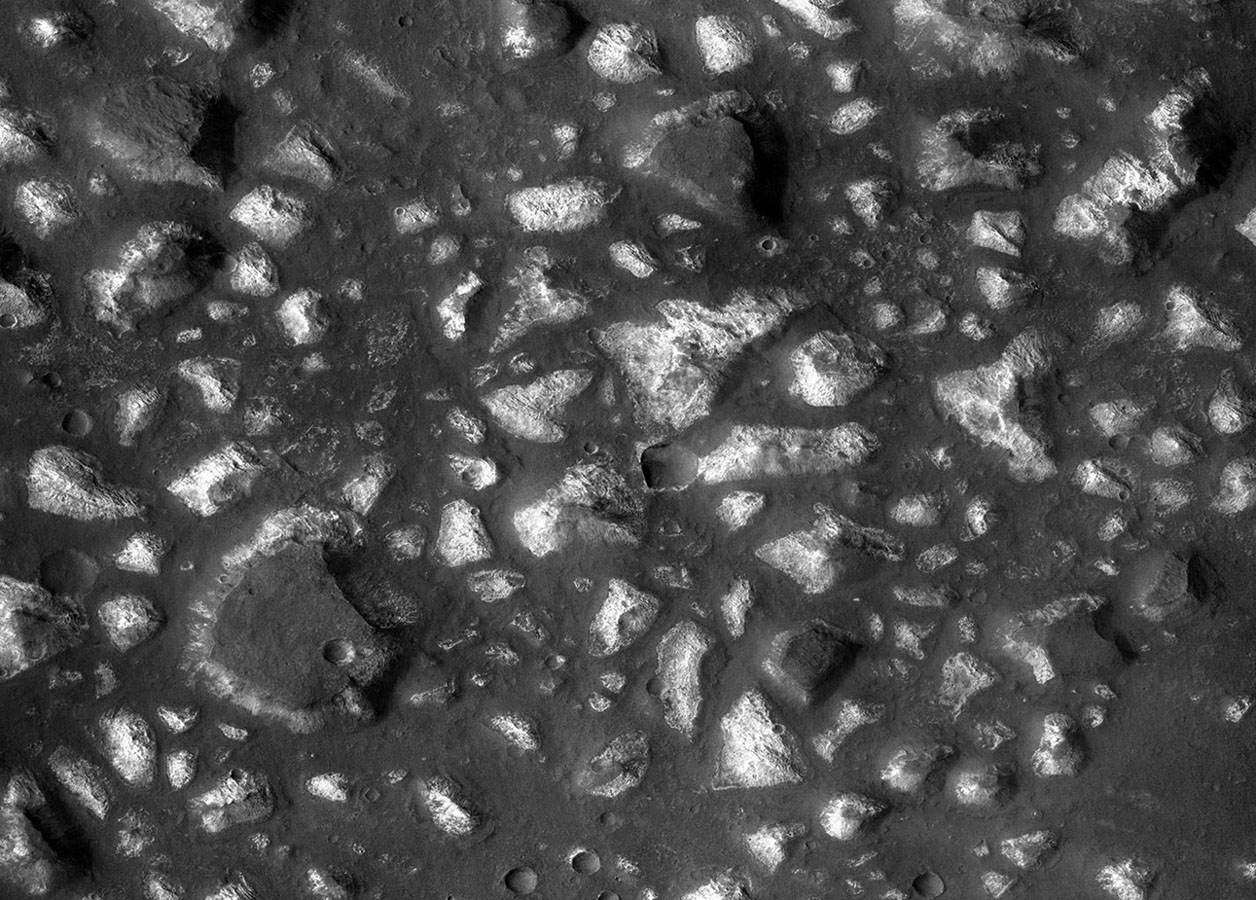
Deep-basin deposits from the floor of Eridania Sea. The mesas on the floor are there because they were protected against intense erosion by deep water/ice cover. CRISM measurements show minerals may be from seafloor hydrothermal deposits.

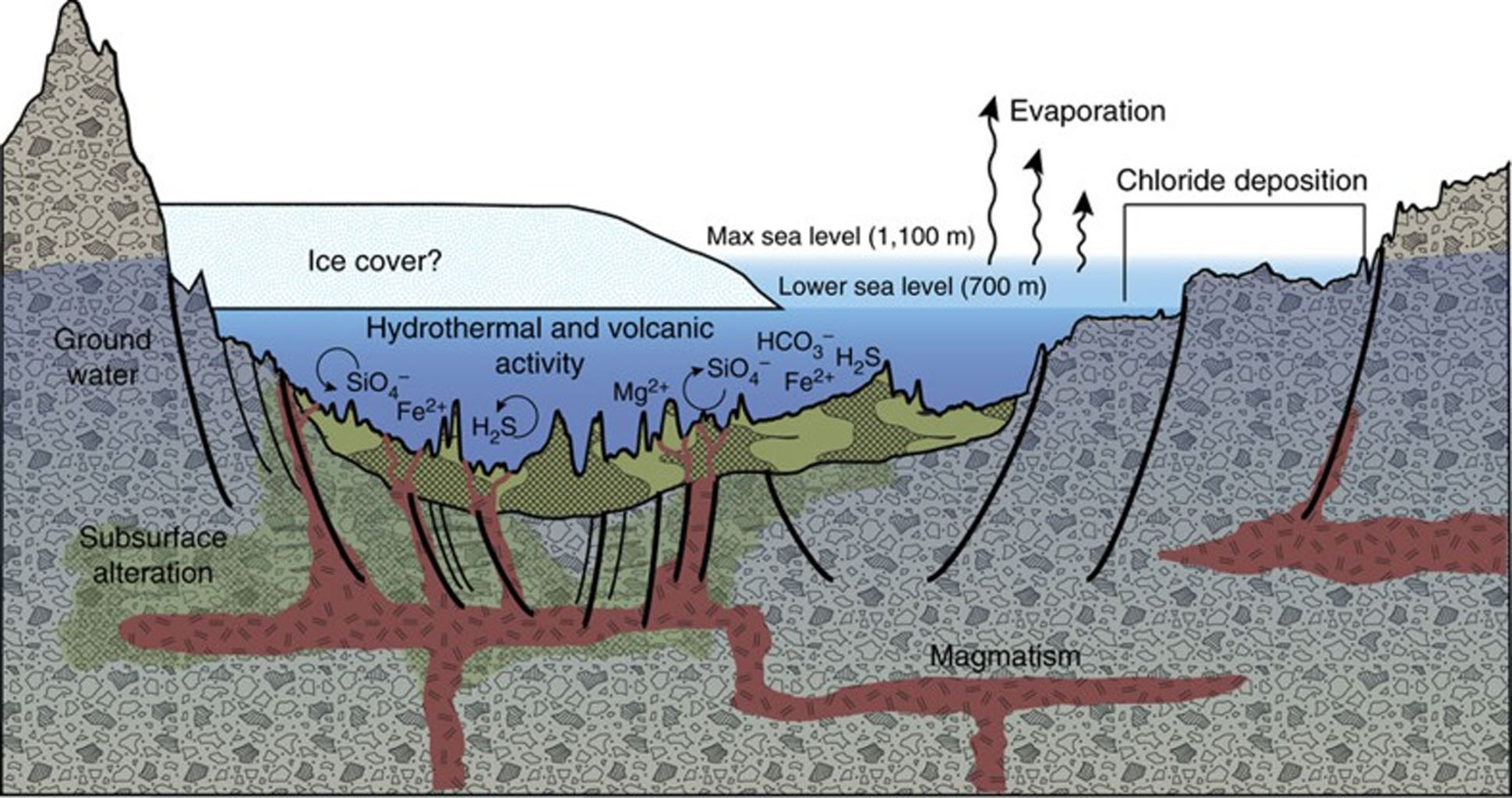
Diagram showing how volcanic activity may have caused deposition of minerals on floor of Eridania Sea. Chlorides were deposited along the shoreline by evaporation.

=== Lake deltas ===
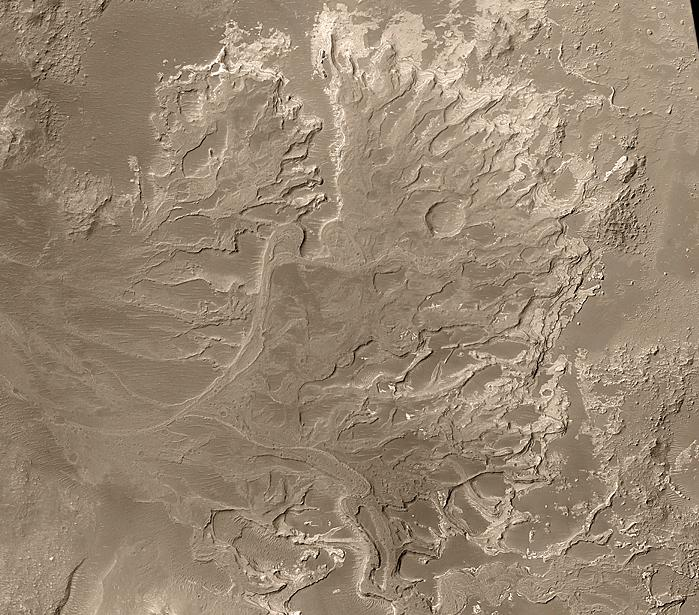
Delta in Eberswalde crater.

Researchers have found a number of examples of deltas that formed in Martian lakes. Finding deltas is a major sign that Mars once had a lot of liquid water. Deltas usually require deep water over a long period of time to form. Also, the water level needs to be stable to keep sediment from washing away. Deltas have been found over a wide geographical range, though there is some indication that deltas may be concentrated around the edges of the putative former northern ocean of Mars.

=== Groundwater ===
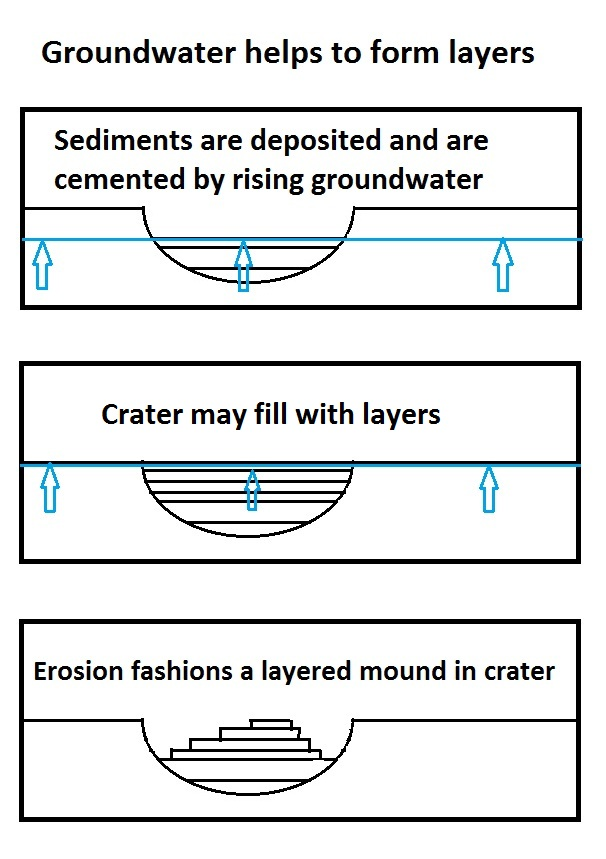
Layers may be formed by groundwater rising up gradually.

By 1979 it was thought that outflow channels formed in single, catastrophic ruptures of subsurface water reservoirs, possibly sealed by ice, discharging colossal quantities of water across an otherwise arid Mars surface. In addition, evidence in favor of heavy or even catastrophic flooding is found in the giant ripples in the Athabasca Vallis. Many outflow channels begin at Chaos or Chasma features, providing evidence for the rupture that could have breached a subsurface ice seal.

The branching valley networks of Mars are not consistent with formation by sudden catastrophic release of groundwater, both in terms of their dendritic shapes that do not come from a single outflow point, and in terms of the discharges that apparently flowed along them. Instead, some authors have argued that they were formed by slow seepage of groundwater from the subsurface essentially as springs. In support of this interpretation, the upstream ends of many valleys in such networks begin with box canyon or "amphitheater" heads, which on Earth are typically associated with groundwater seepage. There is also little evidence of finer scale channels or valleys at the tips of the channels, which some authors have interpreted as showing the flow appeared suddenly from the subsurface with appreciable discharge, rather than accumulating gradually across the surface. Others have disputed the link between amphitheater heads of valleys and formation by groundwater for terrestrial examples, and have argued that the lack of fine scale heads to valley networks is due to their removal by weathering or impact gardening. Most authors accept that most valley networks were at least partly influenced and shaped by groundwater seep processes.

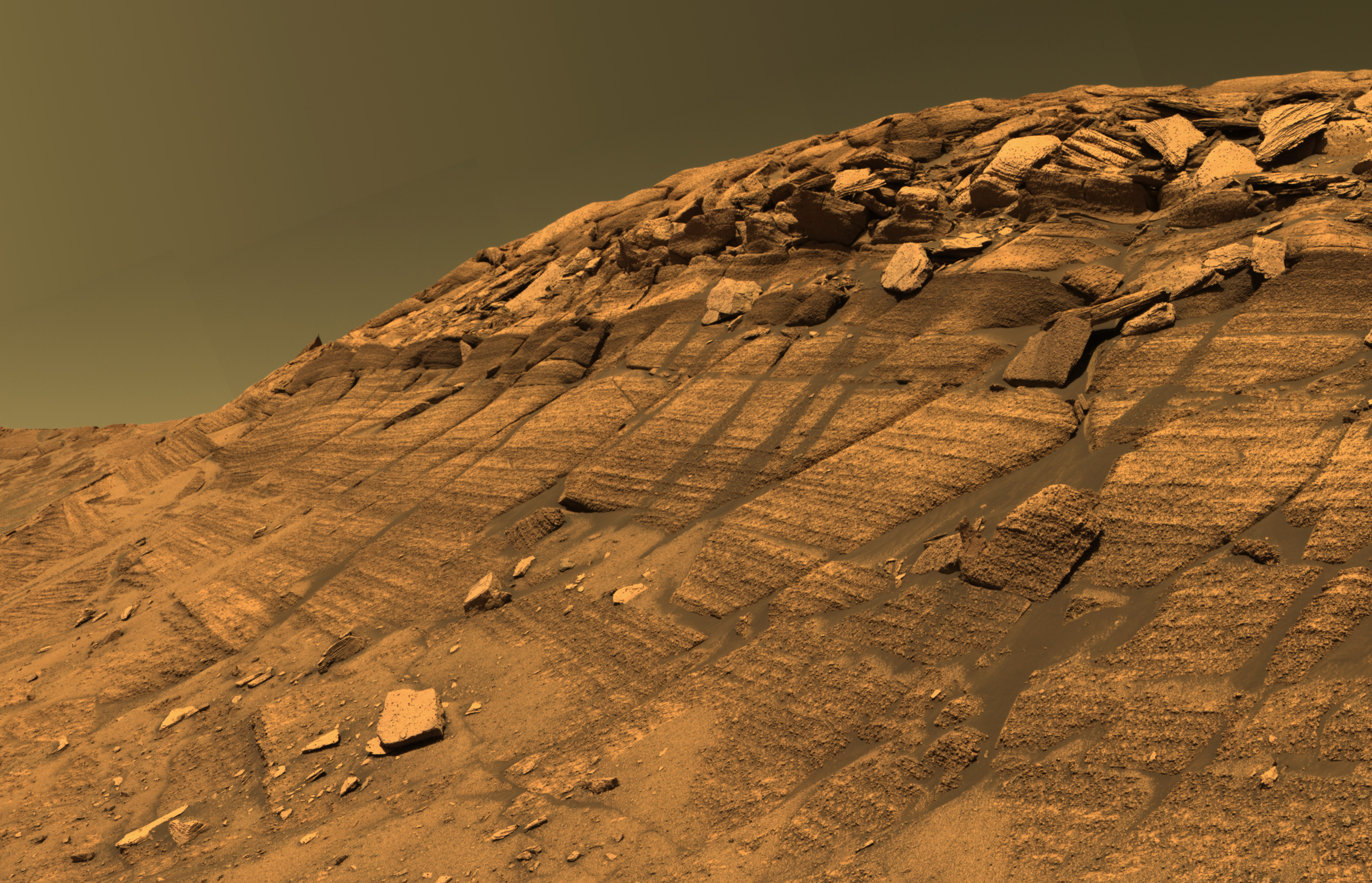
The preservation and cementation of aeolian dune stratigraphy in Burns Cliff in Endurance Crater are thought to have been controlled by flow of shallow groundwater.

Groundwater also played a vital role in controlling broad scale sedimentation patterns and processes on Mars. According to this hypothesis, groundwater with dissolved minerals came to the surface, in and around craters, and helped to form layers by adding minerals—especially sulfate—and cementing sediments. In other words, some layers may have been formed by groundwater rising up depositing minerals and cementing existing, loose, aeolian sediments. The hardened layers are consequently more protected from erosion. A study published in 2011 using data from the Mars Reconnaissance Orbiter, show that the same kinds of sediments exist in a large area that includes Arabia Terra. It has been argued that areas that are rich in sedimentary rocks are also those areas that most likely experienced groundwater upwelling on a regional scale.

In February 2019, European scientists published geological evidence of an ancient planet-wide groundwater system that was, arguably, connected to a putative vast ocean.

=== Mars ocean hypothesis ===
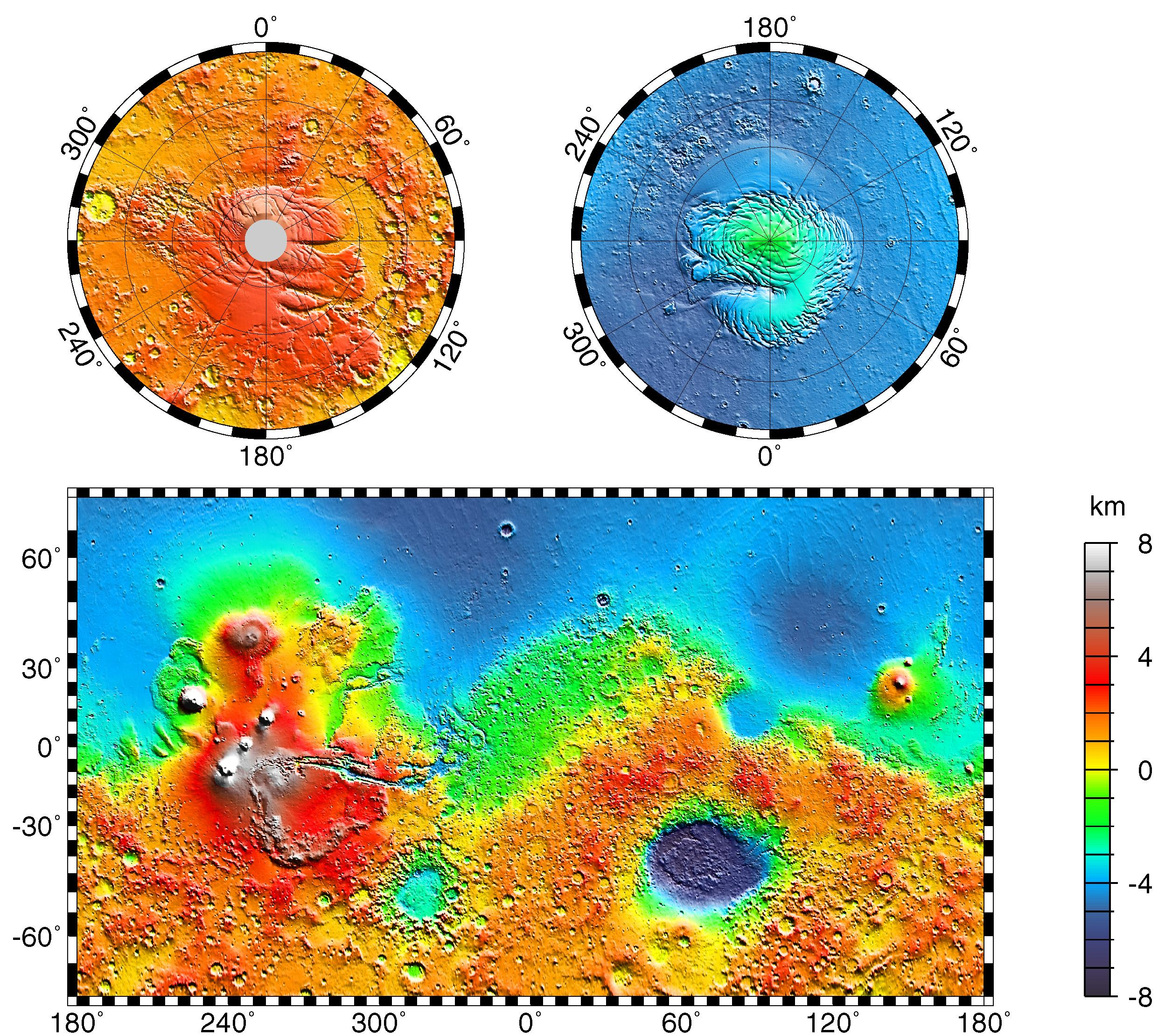
The blue region of low topography in the Martian northern hemisphere is hypothesized to be the site of a primordial ocean of liquid water.

The Mars ocean hypothesis proposes that the Vastitas Borealis basin was the site of an ocean of liquid water at least once, and presents evidence that nearly a third of the surface of Mars was covered by a liquid ocean early in the planet's geologic history. This ocean, dubbed Oceanus Borealis, would have filled the Vastitas Borealis basin in the northern hemisphere, a region that lies 4–5 kilometres (2.5–3.1 mi) below the mean planetary elevation. Two major putative shorelines have been suggested: a higher one, dating to a time period of approximately 3.8 billion years ago and concurrent with the formation of the valley networks in the Highlands, and a lower one, perhaps correlated with the younger outflow channels. The higher one, the 'Arabia shoreline', can be traced all around Mars except through the Tharsis volcanic region. The lower, the 'Deuteronilus', follows the Vastitas Borealis formation.

A study in June 2010 concluded that the more ancient ocean would have covered 36% of Mars. Data from the Mars Orbiter Laser Altimeter (MOLA), which measures the altitude of all terrain on Mars, was used in 1999 to determine that the watershed for such an ocean would have covered about 75% of the planet. Early Mars would have required a warmer climate and denser atmosphere to allow liquid water to exist at the surface. In addition, the large number of valley networks strongly supports the possibility of a hydrological cycle on the planet in the past.

The existence of a primordial Martian ocean remains controversial among scientists, and the interpretations of some features as 'ancient shorelines' has been challenged. One problem with the conjectured 2-billion-year-old (2 Ga) shoreline is that it is not flat—i.e., does not follow a line of constant gravitational potential. This could be due to a change in distribution in Mars's mass, perhaps due to volcanic eruption or meteor impact; the Elysium volcanic province or the massive Utopia basin that is buried beneath the northern plains have been put forward as the most likely causes.

In March 2015, scientists stated that evidence exists for an ancient Martian ocean, likely in the planet's northern hemisphere and about the size of Earth's Arctic Ocean, or approximately 19% of the Martian surface. This finding was derived from the ratio of water and deuterium in the modern Martian atmosphere compared to the ratio found on Earth. Eight times as much deuterium was found at Mars than exists on Earth, suggesting that ancient Mars had significantly higher levels of water. Results from the Curiosity rover had previously found a high ratio of deuterium in Gale Crater, though not significantly high enough to suggest the presence of an ocean. Other scientists caution that this new study has not been confirmed, and point out that Martian climate models have not yet shown that the planet was warm enough in the past to support bodies of liquid water.

Additional evidence for a northern ocean was published in May 2016, describing how some of the surface in Ismenius Lacus quadrangle was altered by two tsunamis. The tsunamis were caused by asteroids striking the ocean. Both were thought to have been strong enough to create 30 km diameter craters. The first tsunami picked up and carried boulders the size of cars or small houses. The backwash from the wave formed channels by rearranging the boulders. The second came in when the ocean was 300 m lower. The second carried a great deal of ice which was dropped in valleys. Calculations show that the average height of the waves would have been 50 m, but the heights would vary from 10 m to 120 m. Numerical simulations show that in this particular part of the ocean two impact craters of the size of 30 km in diameter would form every 30 million years. The implication here is that a great northern ocean may have existed for millions of years. One argument against an ocean has been the lack of shoreline features. These features may have been washed away by these tsunami events. The parts of Mars studied in this research are Chryse Planitia and northwestern Arabia Terra. These tsunamis affected some surfaces in the Ismenius Lacus quadrangle and in the Mare Acidalium quadrangle.

In July 2019, support was reported for an ancient ocean on Mars that may have been formed by a possible mega-tsunami source resulting from a meteorite impact creating Lomonosov crater.

In January 2022, a study about the climate 3 Gy ago on Mars shows that an ocean is stable with a water cycle that is closed. They estimate a return water flow, in form of ice in glacier, from the icy highlands to the ocean is in magnitude less than the Earth at the last glacial maximum. This simulation includes for the first time a circulation of the ocean. They demonstrate that the ocean's circulation prevent the ocean to freeze. These also shows that simulations are in agreement with observed geomorphological features identified as ancient glacial valleys.

== Present water ==
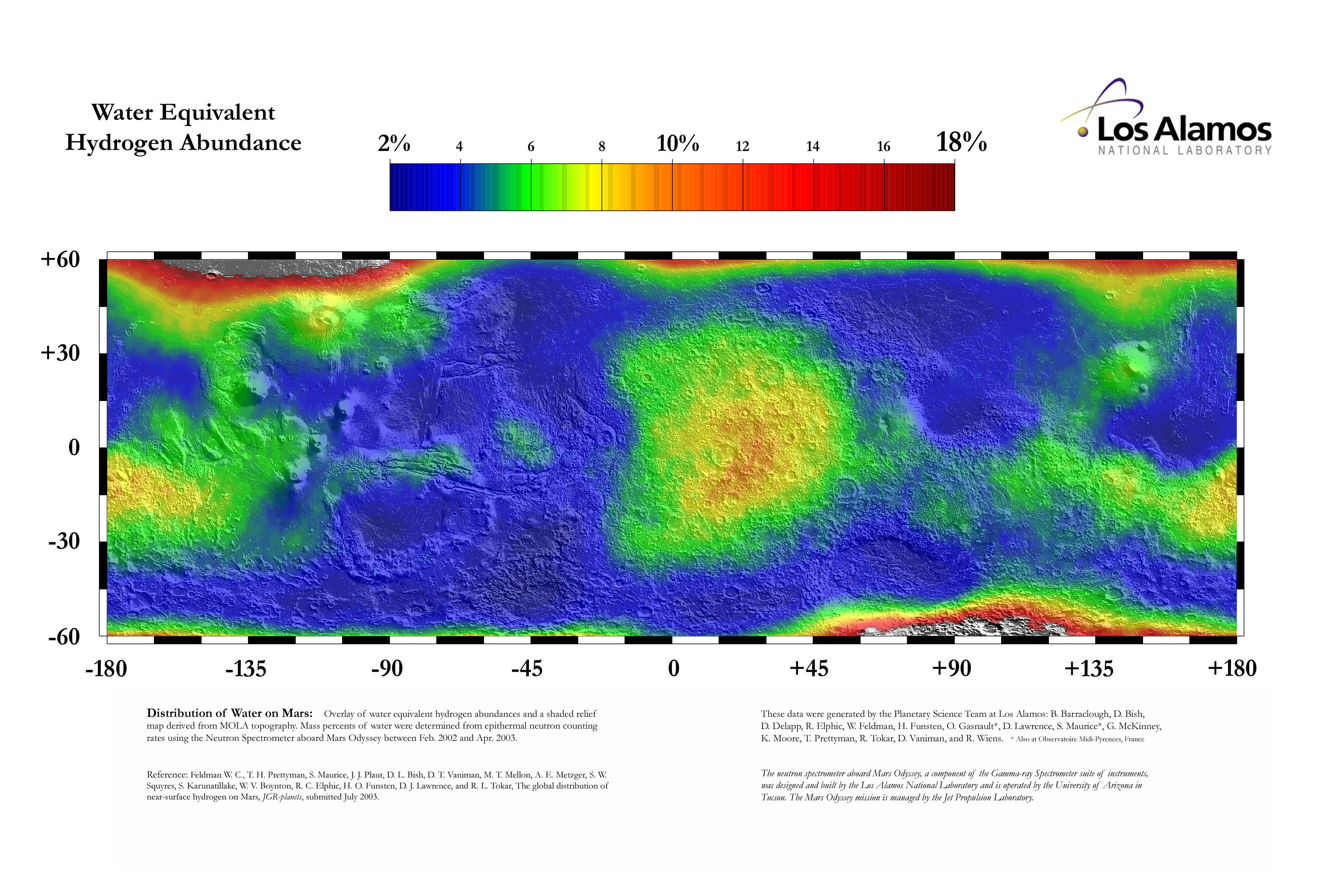

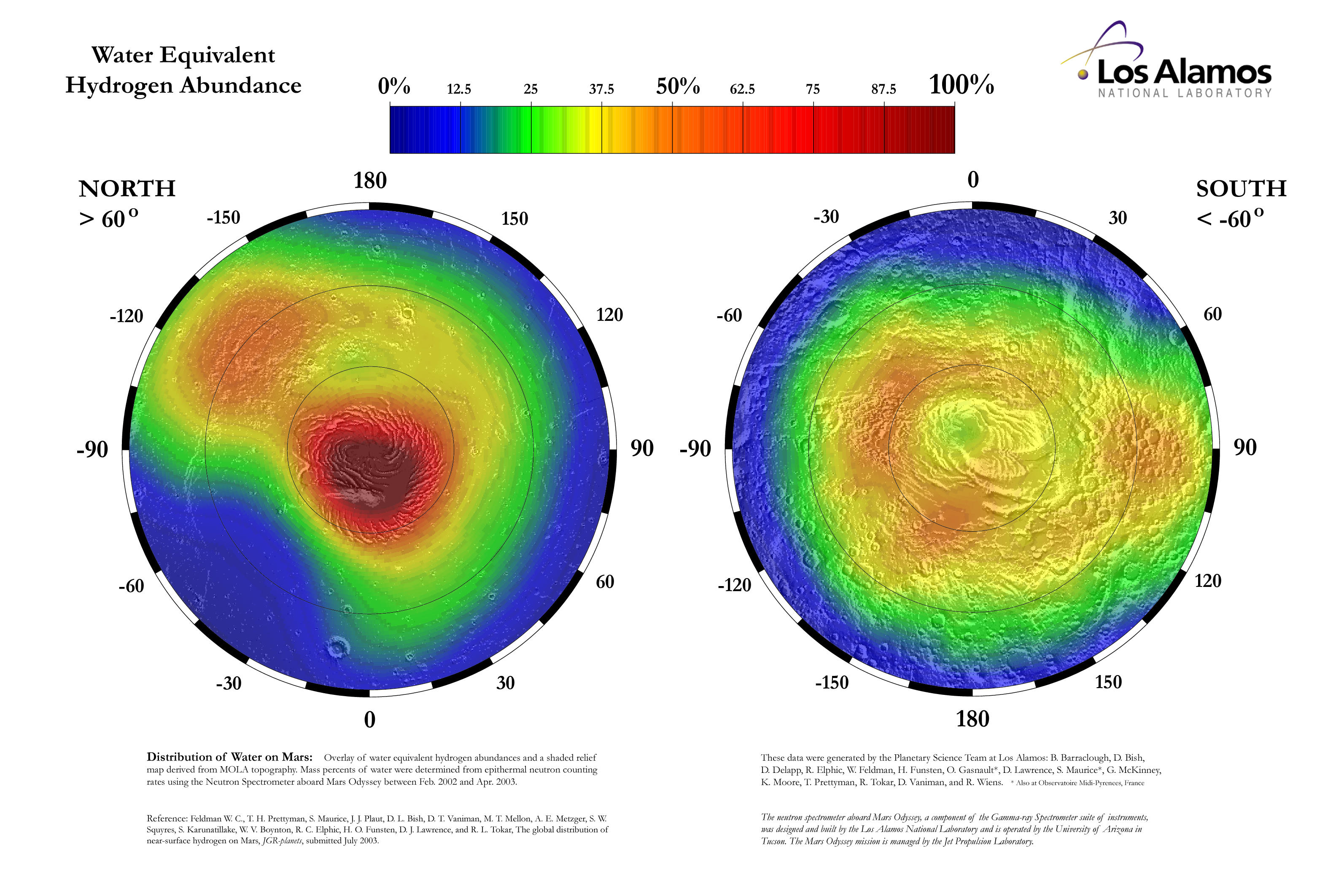
Proportion of water ice present in the upper meter of the Martian surface for lower (top) and higher (bottom) latitudes. The percentages are derived through stoichiometric calculations based on epithermal neutron fluxes. These fluxes were detected by the Neutron Spectrometer aboard the 2001 Mars Odyssey spacecraft.

Evidence for solid, liquid, and gaseous forms of water has been found on Mars. Water ice likely exists in the polar ice caps, glaciers, surface ice, subsurface ice, in clouds and as snow precipitation. Water vapor has been detected in small amounts in the atmosphere. Controversial evidence suggests that liquid water may exist on Mars transiently in very small amounts on the surface, and some evidence suggests that large amounts of liquid water may exist under glaciers and far beneath the surface.

Under conditions typical of the surface of Mars (water vapor pressure <1 Pa and ambient atmospheric pressure ~700 Pa), warming water ice on the Martian surface would sublime (transform into water vapor) at rates of up to 4 meters per year.

It is widely accepted that Mars had abundant water early in its history. A fraction of this water is retained on modern Mars as both ice and locked into the structure of abundant water-rich materials, including clay minerals (phyllosilicates) and sulfates. Studies of hydrogen isotopic ratios indicate that when Mars was forming billions of years ago, asteroids and comets from beyond 2.5 astronomical units (AU) provided water to Mars. The volume of water provided in this way is thought to be equivalent to 6% to 27% of the Earth's present ocean.

A significant amount of surface hydrogen has been observed globally by the Mars Odyssey neutron spectrometer and gamma ray spectrometer and the Mars Express High Resolution Stereo Camera (HRSC). This hydrogen is thought to be incorporated into the molecular structure of ice, and through stoichiometric calculations the observed fluxes have been converted into concentrations of water ice in the upper meter of the Martian surface. This process has revealed that ice is both widespread and abundant on the present surface. Below 60 degrees of latitude, ice is concentrated in several regions, particularly around the Elysium volcanoes, Terra Sabaea, and northwest of Terra Sirenum, and exists in concentrations up to 18% ice in the subsurface. Above 60 degrees latitude, ice is highly abundant. Polewards on 70 degrees of latitude, ice concentrations exceed 25% almost everywhere, and approach 100% at the poles. The SHARAD and MARSIS radar sounding instruments have also confirmed that individual surface features are ice rich. Due to the known instability of ice at current Martian surface conditions, it is thought that almost all of this ice is covered by a thin layer of rocky or dusty material.

The Mars Odyssey neutron spectrometer observations indicate that if all the ice in the top meter of the Martian surface were spread evenly, it would give a Water Equivalent Global layer (WEG) of at least ≈14 centimetres (5.5 in)—in other words, the globally averaged Martian surface is approximately 14% water. The water ice currently locked in both Martian poles corresponds to a WEG of 30 metres (98 ft), and geomorphic evidence favors significantly larger quantities of surface water over geologic history, with WEG as deep as 500 metres (1,600 ft). It is thought that part of this past water has been lost to the deep subsurface, and part to space, although the detailed mass balance of these processes remains poorly understood. The current atmospheric reservoir of water is important as a conduit allowing gradual migration of ice from one part of the surface to another on both seasonal and longer timescales, but it is insignificant in volume, with a WEG of no more than 10 micrometres (0.00039 in).

It is possible that liquid water could also exist on the surface of Mars through the formation of brines suggested by the abundance of hydrated salts. Brines are significant on Mars because they can stabilize liquid water at lower temperatures than pure water on its own. Pure liquid water is unstable on the surface of the planet, as it is subjected to freezing, evaporation, and boiling. Similar to how salt is applied to roads on Earth to prevent them from icing over, briny mixtures of water and salt on Mars may have low enough freezing points to lead to stable liquid at the surface. Given the complex nature of the Martian regolith, mixtures of salts are known to change the stability of brines. Modeling the deliquescence of salt mixtures can be used to test for brine stability and can help us determine if liquid brines are present on the surface of Mars. The composition of the Martian regolith, determined by the Phoenix lander, can be used to constrain these models and give an accurate representation of how brines may actually form on the planet. Results of these models give water activity values for various salts at different temperatures, where the lower the water activity, the more stable the brine. At temperatures between 208 K and 253 K, chlorate salts exhibit the lowest water activity values, and below 208 K chloride salts exhibit the lowest values. Results of modeling show that the aforementioned complex mixtures of salts do not significantly increase the stability of brines, indicating that brines may not be a significant source of liquid water at the surface of Mars.

In September 2019, researchers reported that the InSight lander uncovered unexplained magnetic pulses, and magnetic oscillations consistent with liquid water deep underground.

Based on data from the InSight lander, scientists suggested liquid water exists deep underground. According to a paper published April 25, 2025 in the journal National Science Review, recordings of seismic waves from deep within the Red Planet indicate that a layer of liquid water may be in the Martian rocks between 3.4 and 5 miles [5.4 to 8 kilometers] below the surface.

The total volume of hidden water could flood the whole of Mars's surface with an ocean 1,700 to 2,560 feet [520 to 780 metres] deep, around the same volume of liquid that is contained within Antarctica's ice sheet, the study authors estimate. Another group earlier found similar results and suggested the water would be in fractures in igneous rocks.

=== Polar ice caps ===
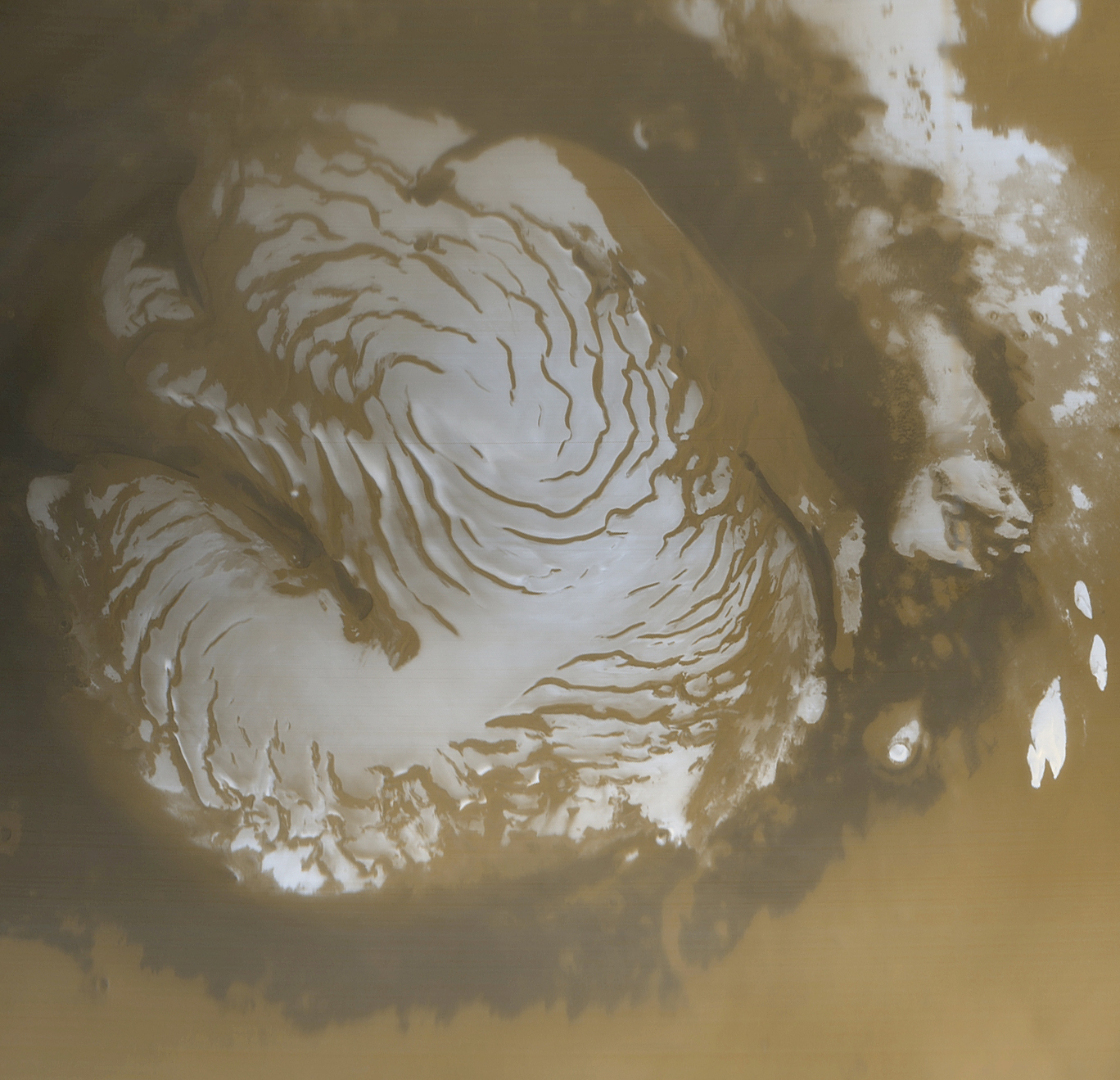
The Mars Global Surveyor acquired this image of the Martian north polar ice cap in early northern summer.

The existence of ice in the Martian northern (Planum Boreum) and southern (Planum Australe) polar caps has been known since the time of Mariner 9 orbiter. However, the amount and purity of this ice were not known until the early 2000s. In 2004, the MARSIS radar sounder on the European Mars Express satellite confirmed the existence of relatively clean ice in the south polar ice cap that extends to a depth of 3.7 kilometres (2.3 mi) below the surface. Similarly, the SHARAD radar sounder on board the Mars Reconnaissance Orbiter observed the base of the north polar cap 1.5 – 2 km beneath the surface. Together, the volume of ice present in the Martian north and south polar ice caps is similar to that of the Greenland ice sheet.

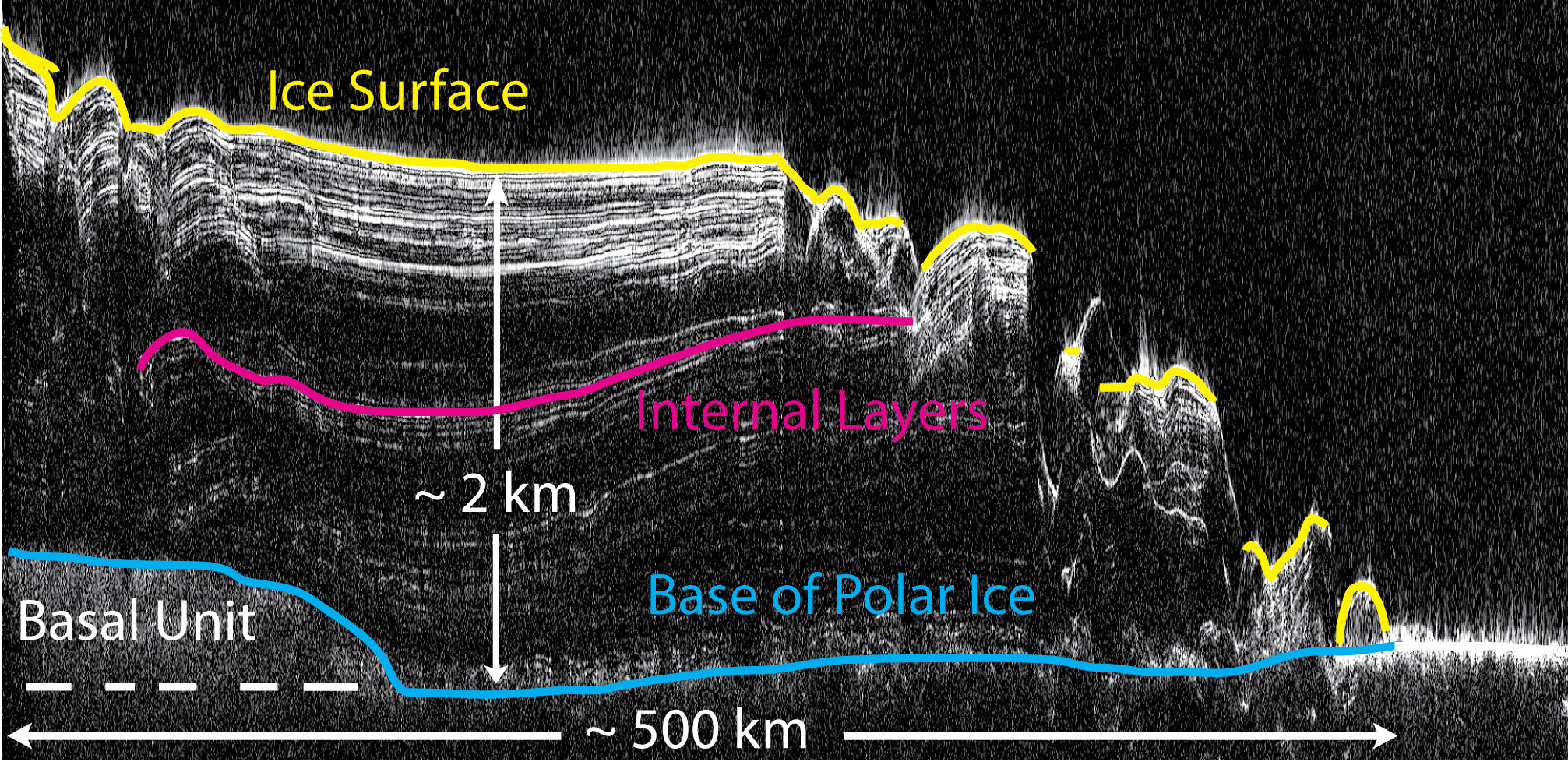
Cross-section of a portion of the north polar ice cap of Mars, derived from satellite radar sounding.

An even larger ice sheet on south polar region sheet is suspected to have retreated in ancient times (Hesperian period), that may have contained 20 million km^{3} of water ice, which is equivalent to a layer 137 m deep over the entire planet.

Both polar caps reveal abundant internal layers of ice and dust when examined with images of the spiral-shaped troughs that cut through their volume, and the subsurface radar measurements showed that these layers extend continuously across the ice sheets. This layering contains a record of past climates on Mars, just how Earth's ice sheets have a record for Earth's climate. Reading this record is not straightforward however, so, many researchers have studied this layering not only to understand the structure, history, and flow properties of the caps, but also to understand the evolution of climate on Mars.

Surrounding the polar caps are many smaller ice sheets inside craters, some of which lie under thick deposits of sand or martian dust. Particularly, the 81.4 kilometres (50.6 mi) wide Korolev Crater, is estimated to contain approximately 2,200 cubic kilometres (530 mi^{3}) of water ice exposed to the surface. Korolev's floor lies about 2 kilometres (1.2 mi) below the rim, and is covered by a 1.8 kilometres (1.1 mi) deep central mound of permanent water ice, up to 60 kilometres (37 mi) in diameter.

==== Possible subglacial liquid water ====
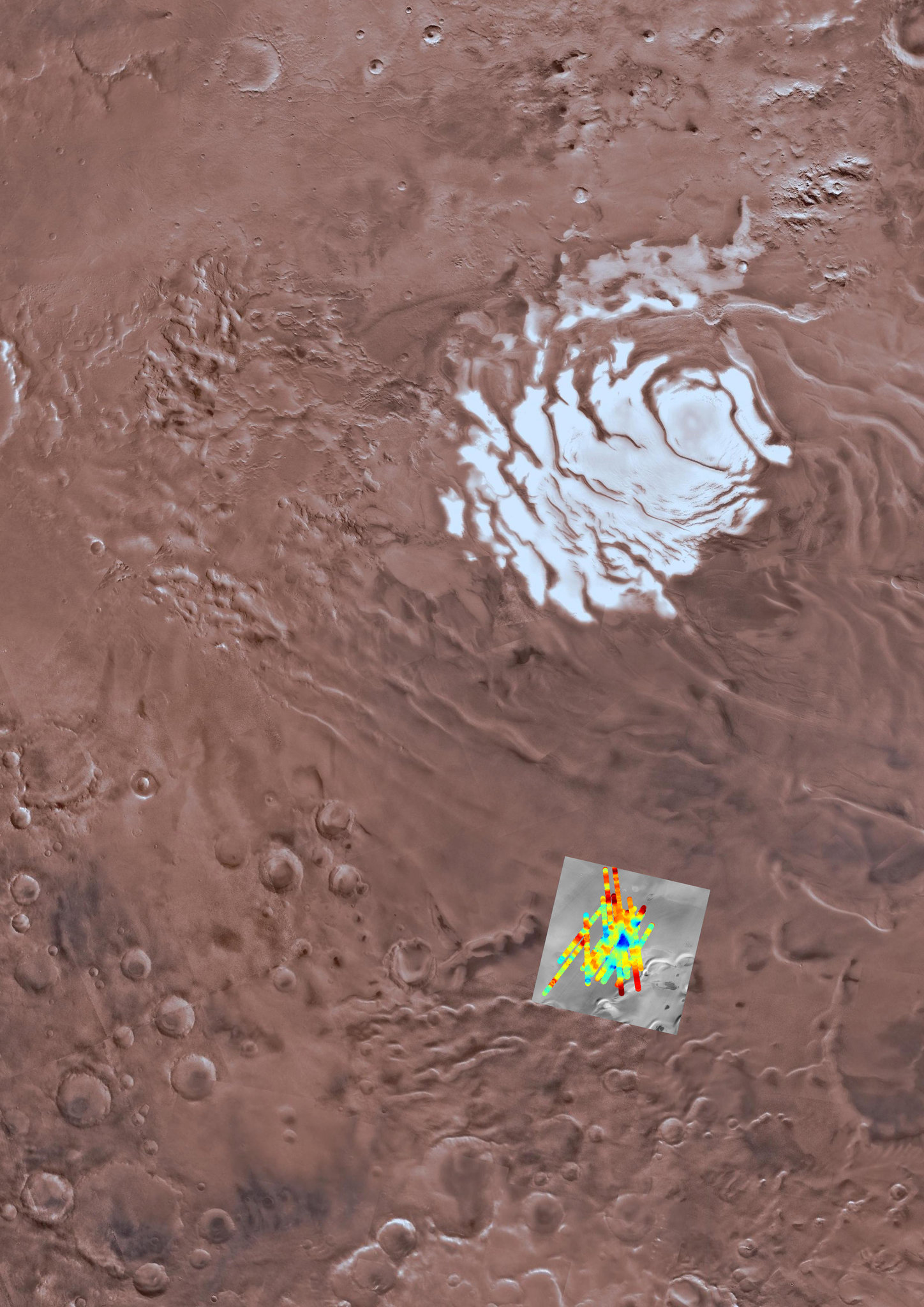
Site of south polar subglacial water body (reported July 2018).

The potential existence of subglacial lakes on Mars was hypothesised when modelling of Lake Vostok in Antarctica showed that this lake could have existed before the Antarctic glaciation, and that a similar scenario could potentially have occurred on Mars. In July 2018, scientists from the Italian Space Agency reported the detection of such a potential subglacial lake on Mars, 1.5 kilometres (1 mi) below the southern polar ice cap, and spanning 20 kilometres (10 mi) horizontally, the first evidence for a potential stable body of liquid water on the planet. The evidence for this potential Martian lake was deduced from a bright spot in the radar echo sounding data of the MARSIS radar on board the European Mars Express orbiter, collected between May 2012 and December 2015. The potential lake is centred at 193°E, 81°S, a flat area that does not exhibit any peculiar topographic characteristics but is surrounded by higher ground, except on its eastern side where there is a depression. The SHARAD radar on board NASA's Mars Reconnaissance Orbiter has seen no sign of the lake.

On 28 September 2020, the MARSIS discovery was supported, using new data, and reanalysing all the data with a new technique. These new radar studies report three more potential subglacial lakes on Mars. All are 1.5 km (0.93 mi) below the southern polar ice cap. The size of the first potential lake found, and the largest, has been corrected to 30 km (19 mi) wide. It is surrounded by 3 smaller potential lakes, each a few kilometres wide.

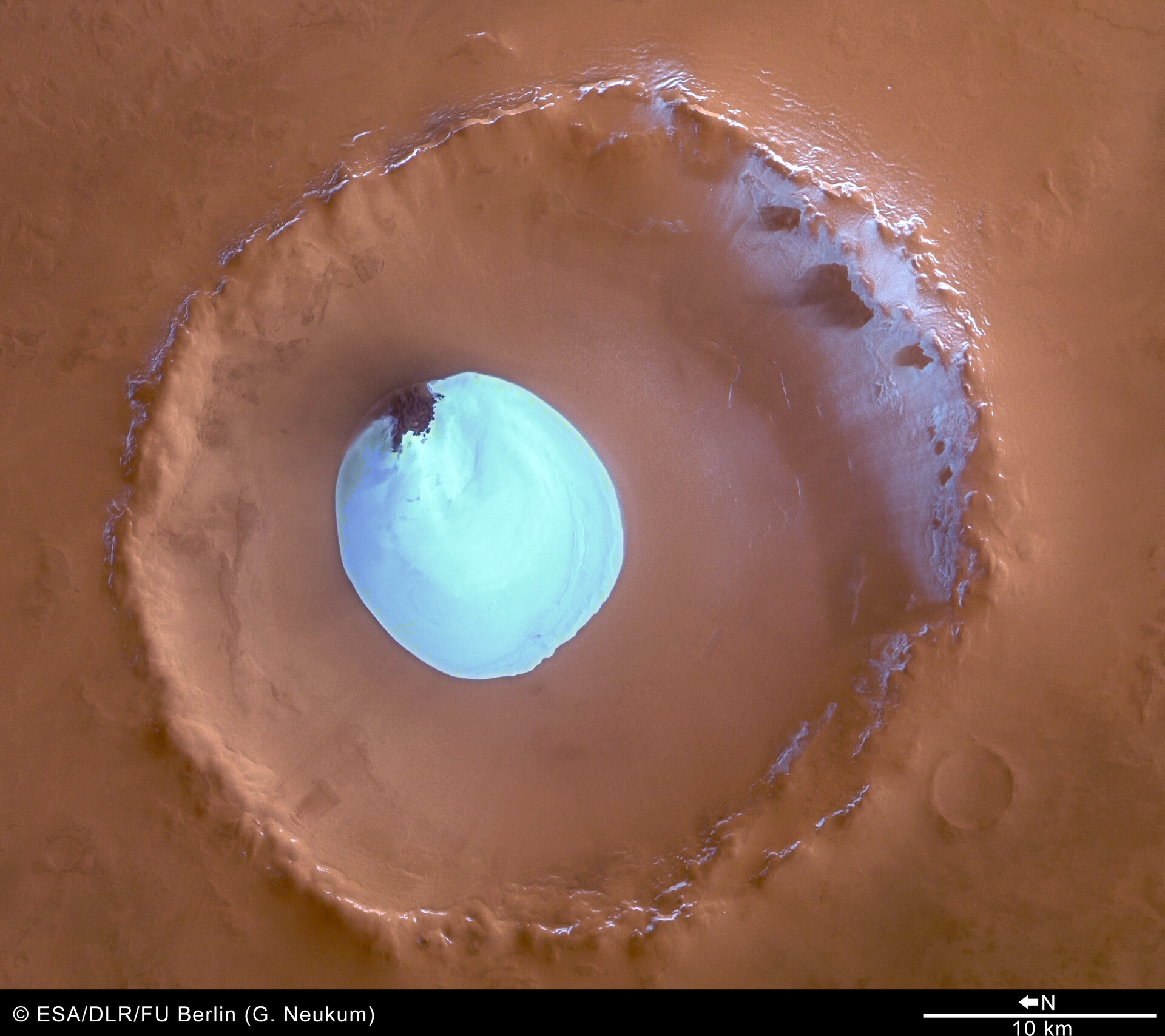
Patch of water ice sitting on the floor of the Louth Crater near the North Pole of Mars (70.5° North and 103° East)

Because the temperature at the base of the polar cap is estimated to be 205 K (−68 °C; −91 °F), scientists assume that water could remain liquid through the antifreeze effect of magnesium and calcium perchlorates. The 1.5-kilometre (0.93 mi) ice layer covering the potential lake is composed of water ice with 10 to 20% admixed dust, and seasonally covered by a 1-metre-thick (3 ft 3 in) layer of CO_{2} ice. Since the raw-data coverage of the south polar ice cap is limited, the discoverers stated that "there is no reason to conclude that the presence of subsurface water on Mars is limited to a single location."

In 2019, a study was published that explored the physical conditions necessary for such a lake to exist. The study calculated the amount of geothermal heat necessary to reach temperatures under which a liquid water and perchlorate mix would be stable under the ice. The authors concluded that "even if there are local concentrations of large amounts of perchlorate salts at the base of the south polar ice, typical Martian conditions are too cold to melt the ice ... a local heat source within the crust is needed to increase the temperatures, and a magma chamber within 10 km of the ice could provide such a heat source. This result suggests that if the liquid water interpretation of the observations is correct, magmatism on Mars may have been active extremely recently."

China's Zhurong rover that studied Utopia Planitia region of Mars found a shift in sand dunes at around the same time as layers in the North polar region changed. Researchers believe that the tilt of Mars changed at that time and produced changes in the winds at Zhurong's landing site and in the layers in the ice cap.

If a liquid lake does indeed exist, its salty water may also be mixed with soil to form a sludge. The lake's high levels of salt would present difficulties for most lifeforms. On Earth, organisms called halophiles exist that thrive in extremely salty conditions, though not in dark, cold, concentrated perchlorate solutions. Nevertheless, halotolerant organisms might be able to cope with enhanced perchlorate concentrations by drawing on physiological adaptations similar to those observed in the yeast Debaryomyces hansenii exposed in lab experiments to increasing NaClO_{4} concentrations.

=== Ground ice and subsurface ice ===
For many years, various scientists have suggested that some Martian surfaces look like periglacial regions on Earth. By analogy with these terrestrial features, it has been argued for many years that these may be regions of permafrost. This would suggest that frozen water lies right beneath the surface. A common feature in the higher latitudes, patterned ground, can occur in a number of shapes, including stripes and polygons. On the Earth, these shapes are caused by the freezing and thawing of soil. There are other types of evidence for large amounts of frozen water under the surface of Mars, such as terrain softening, which rounds sharp topographical features. Evidence from Mars Odyssey's gamma ray spectrometer and direct measurements with the Phoenix lander have corroborated that many of these features are intimately associated with the presence of ground ice.

A large team of researchers examined the possibilities of ground ice accumulation. Their model gives information about the conditions for which the process of ice segregation is possible on Mars and the rates of ice growth. An earilier study also did work on this topic.

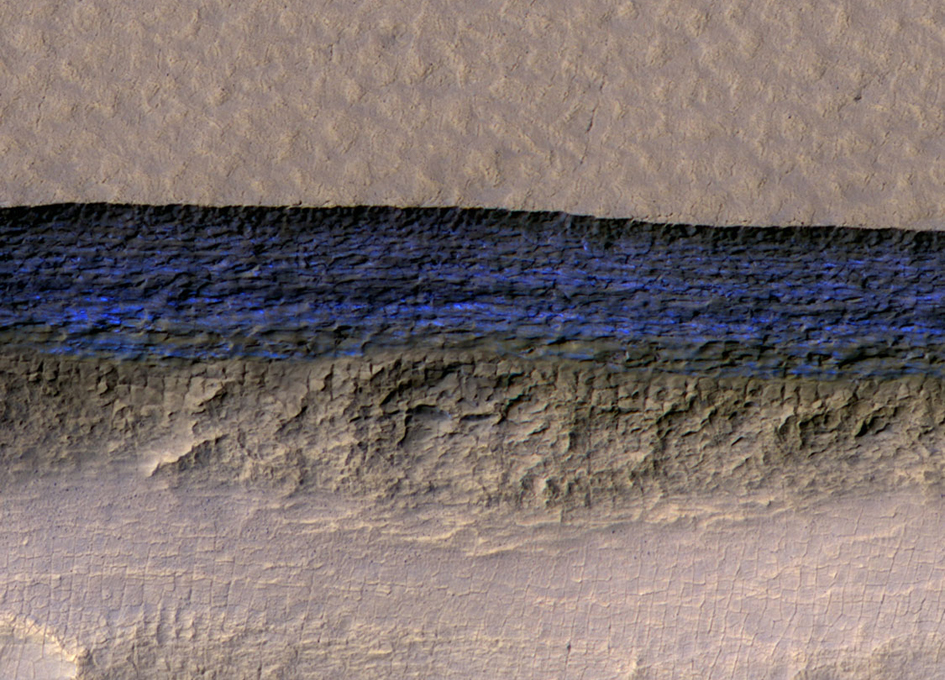
A cross-section of underground water ice is exposed at the steep slope that appears bright blue in this enhanced-color view from the MRO. The scene is about 500 meters wide. The scarp drops about 128 meters from the level ground. The ice sheets extend from just below the surface to a depth of 100 meters or more.

In 2018, using the HiRISE camera on board the Mars Reconnaissance Orbiter (MRO), researchers found at least eight eroding slopes showing exposed water ice sheets as thick as 100 meters, covered by a layer of about 1 or 2 meters thick of soil. The sites are at latitudes from about 55 to 58 degrees, suggesting that there is shallow ground ice under roughly a third of the Martian surface. This image confirms what was previously detected with the spectrometer on 2001 Mars Odyssey, the ground-penetrating radars on MRO and on Mars Express, and by the Phoenix lander in situ excavation. These ice layers hold easily accessible clues about Mars's climate history and make frozen water accessible to future robotic or human explorers. Some researchers suggested these deposits could be the remnants of glaciers that existed millions of years ago when the planet's spin axis and orbit were different. (See section Mars's Ice ages below.) A more detailed study published in 2019 discovered that water ice exists at latitudes north of 35°N and south of 45°S, with some ice patches only a few centimeters from the surface covered by dust. Extraction of water ice at these conditions would not require complex equipment.

Ice disappearing after being exposed by impact.
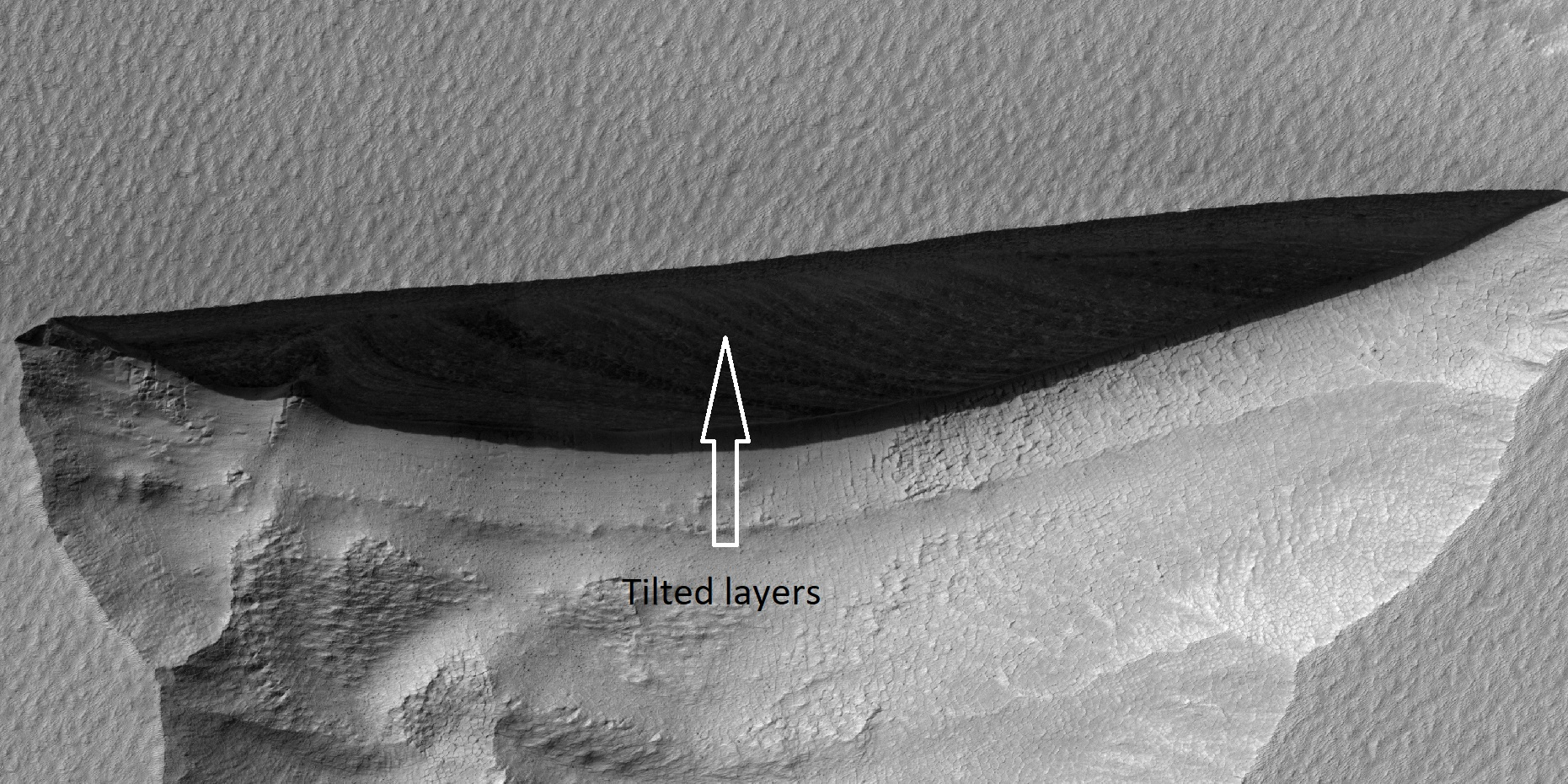
Close view of wall of triangular depression, as seen by HiRISE layers are visible in the wall. These layers contain ice. The lower layers are tilted, while layers near the surface are more or less horizontal. Such an arrangement of layers is called an "angular unconformity".

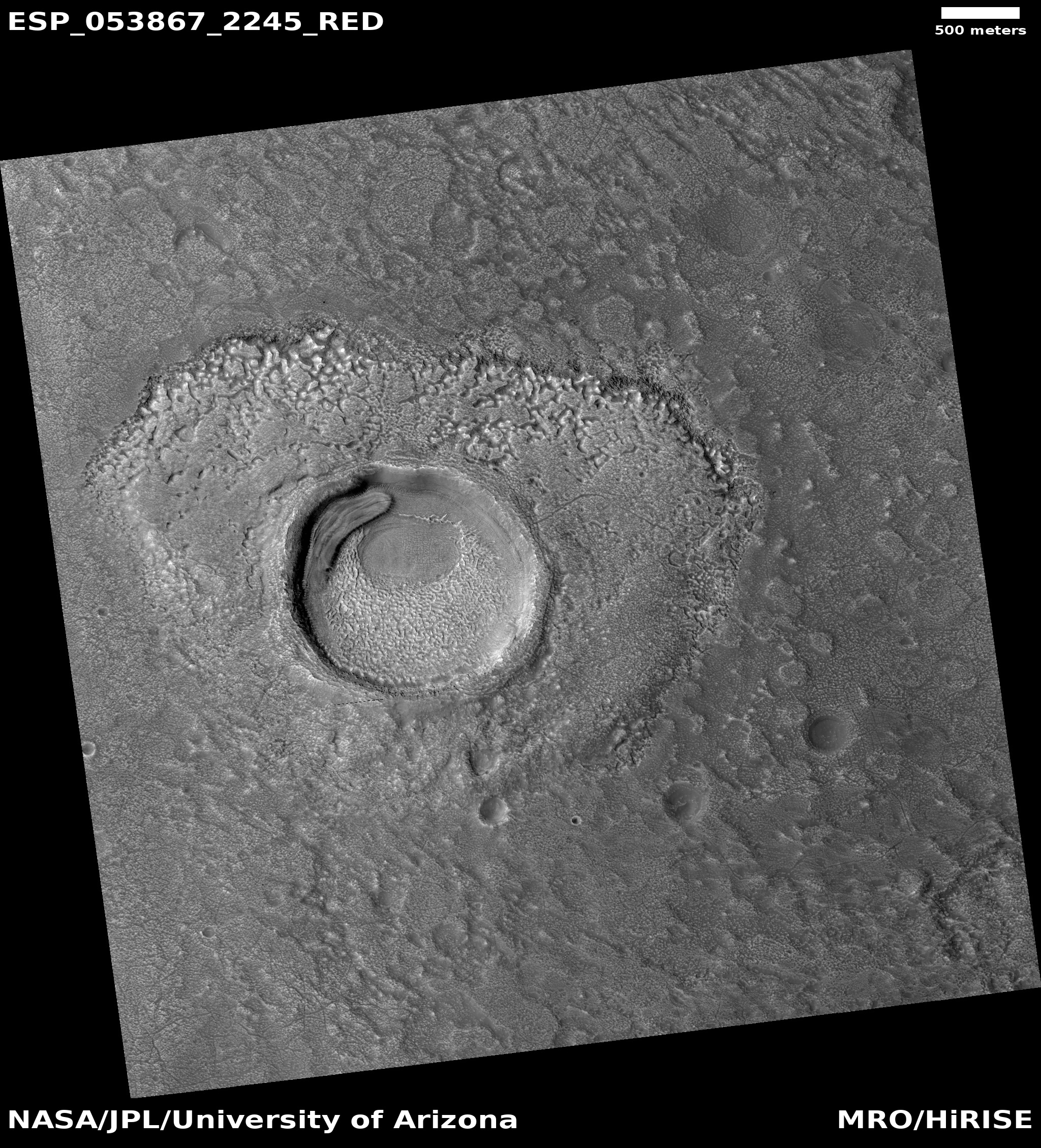
Impact crater that may have formed in ice-rich ground, as seen by HiRISE under HiWish program Location is the Ismenius Lacus quadrangle.

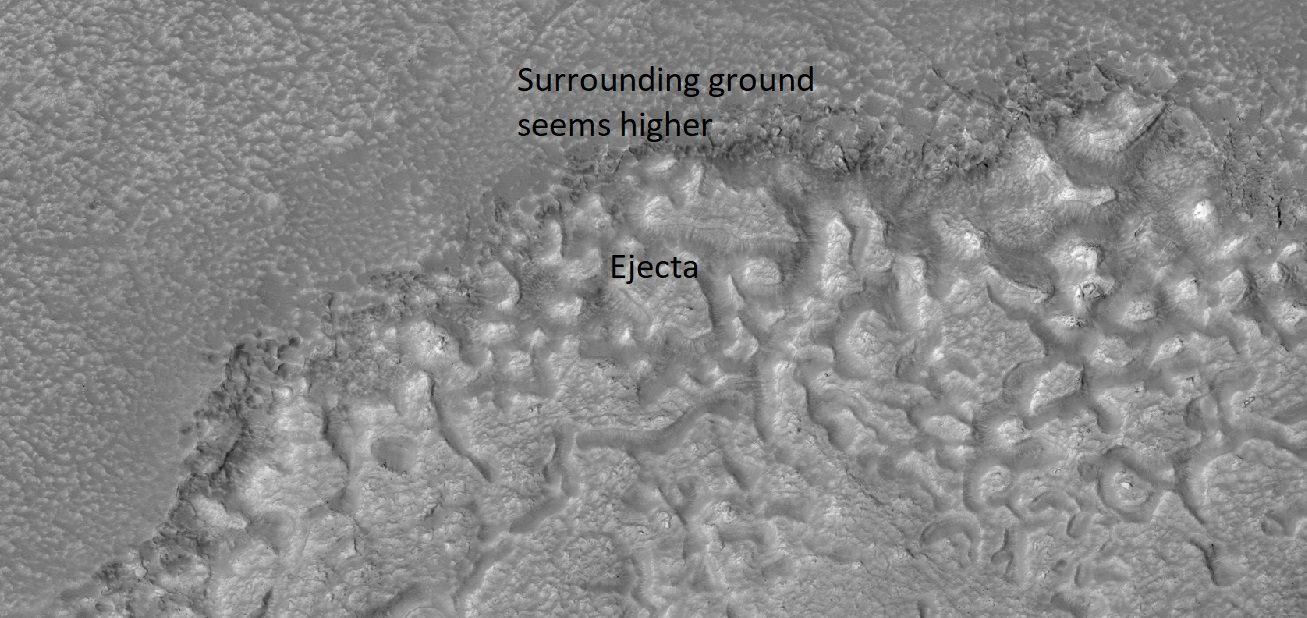
Close view of impact crater that may have formed in ice-rich ground, as seen by HiRISE under HiWish program. Note that the ejecta seems lower than the surroundings. The hot ejecta may have caused some of the ice to go away, thus lowering the level of the ejecta.

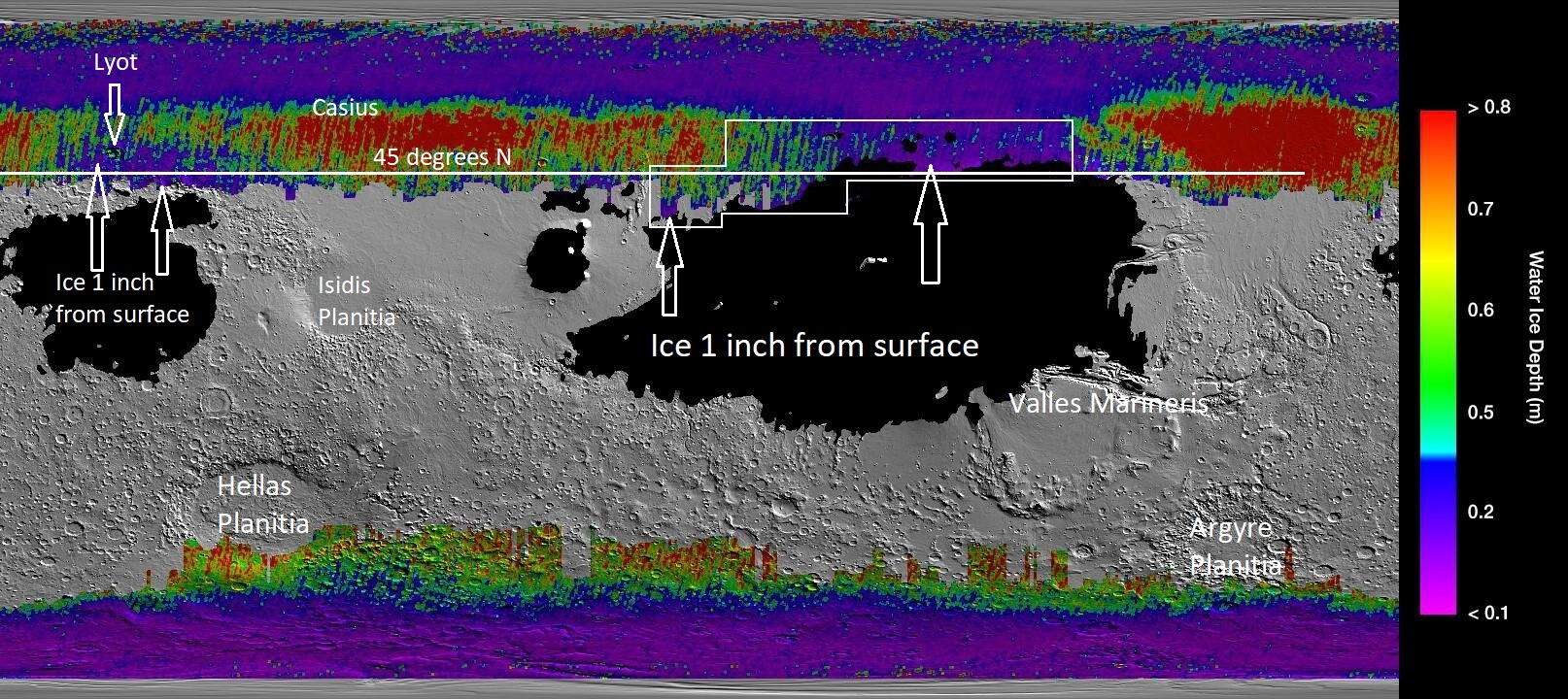
Map of near surface ice

==== Scalloped topography ====
Certain regions of Mars display scalloped-shaped depressions. The depressions are suspected to be the remains of a degrading ice-rich mantle deposit. Scallops are caused by ice sublimating from frozen soil. The landforms of scalloped topography can be formed by the subsurface loss of water ice by sublimation under current Martian climate conditions. A model predicts similar shapes when the ground has large amounts of pure ice, up to many tens of meters in depth. This mantle material was probably deposited from the atmosphere as ice formed on dust when the climate was different due to changes in the tilt of the Mars pole (see § Ice ages, below). The scallops are typically tens of meters deep and from a few hundred to a few thousand meters across. They can be almost circular or elongated. Some appear to have coalesced causing a large heavily pitted terrain to form. The process of forming the terrain may begin with sublimation from a crack. There are often polygonal cracks where scallops form, and the presence of scalloped topography seems to be an indication of frozen ground.

On November 22, 2016, NASA reported finding a large amount of underground ice in the Utopia Planitia region of Mars. The volume of water detected has been estimated to be equivalent to the volume of water in Lake Superior.

The volume of water ice in the region were based on measurements from the ground-penetrating radar instrument on Mars Reconnaissance Orbiter, called SHARAD. From the data obtained from SHARAD, "dielectric permittivity", or the dielectric constant was determined. The dielectric constant value was consistent with a large concentration of water ice.

These scalloped features are superficially similar to Swiss cheese features, found around the south polar cap. Swiss cheese features are thought to be due to cavities forming in a surface layer of solid carbon dioxide, rather than water ice—although the floors of these holes are probably H_{2}O-rich.

==== Ice patches ====
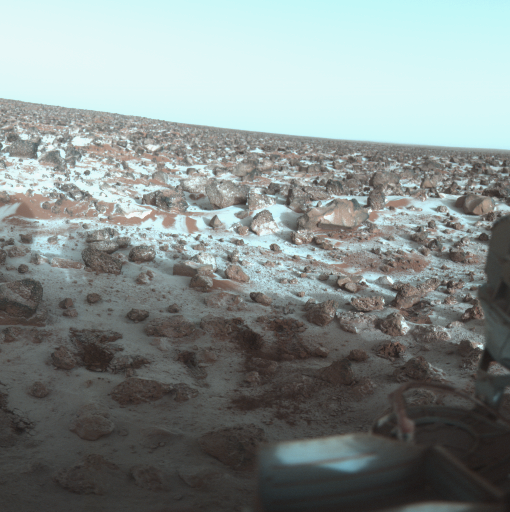
Precipitated water ice covering the Martian plain Utopia Planitia, the water ice precipitated by adhering to dry ice (observed by the Viking 2 lander)

On July 28, 2005, the European Space Agency announced the existence of a crater partially filled with frozen water; some then interpreted the discovery as an "ice lake". Images of the crater, taken by the High Resolution Stereo Camera on board the European Space Agency's Mars Express orbiter, clearly show a broad sheet of ice in the bottom of an unnamed crater located on Vastitas Borealis, a broad plain that covers much of Mars's far northern latitudes, at approximately 70.5° North and 103° East. The crater is 35 kilometres (22 mi) wide and about 2 kilometres (1.2 mi) deep. The height difference between the crater floor and the surface of the water ice is about 200 metres (660 ft). ESA scientists have attributed most of this height difference to sand dunes beneath the water ice, which are partially visible. While scientists do not refer to the patch as a "lake", the water ice patch is remarkable for its size and for being present throughout the year. Deposits of water ice and layers of frost have been found in many different locations on the planet, including the volcanoes in the Tharsis region, where about 150,000 tons of water ice will form and evaporate daily in the cold seasons.

As more and more of the surface of Mars has been imaged by the modern generation of orbiters, it has become gradually more apparent that there are probably many more patches of ice scattered across the Martian surface. Many of these putative patches of ice are concentrated in the Martian mid-latitudes (≈30–60° N/S of the equator). For example, many scientists think that the widespread features in those latitude bands variously described as "latitude dependent mantle" or "pasted-on terrain" consist of dust- or debris-covered ice patches, which are slowly degrading. A cover of debris is required both to explain the dull surfaces seen in the images that do not reflect like ice, and also to allow the patches to exist for an extended period of time without subliming away completely. These patches have been suggested as possible water sources for some of the enigmatic channelized flow features like gullies also seen in those latitudes.

Surface features consistent with existing pack ice have been discovered in the southern Elysium Planitia. What appear to be plates, ranging in size from 30 metres (98 ft) to 30 kilometres (19 mi), are found in channels leading to a large flooded area. The plates show signs of break up and rotation that clearly distinguish them from lava plates elsewhere on the surface of Mars. The source for the flood is thought to be the nearby geological fault Cerberus Fossae that spewed water as well as lava aged some 2 to 10 million years. It was suggested that the water exited the Cerberus Fossae then pooled and froze in the low, level plains and that such frozen lakes may still exist.

=== Glaciers ===
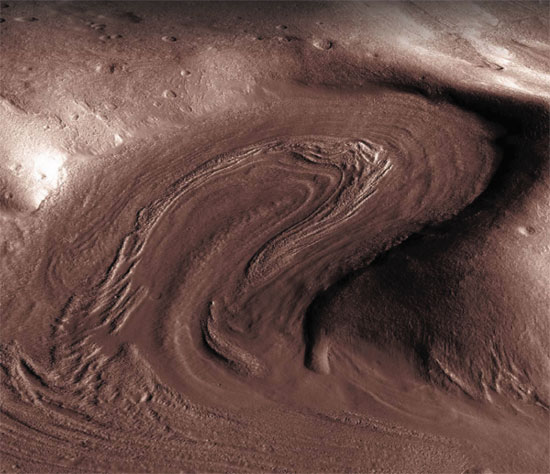
View of a 5-km-wide, glacial-like lobe deposit sloping up into a box canyon. The surface has moraines, deposits of rocks that show how the glacier advanced.

Many large areas of Mars either appear to host glaciers, or carry evidence that they used to be present. Much of the areas in high latitudes, especially the Ismenius Lacus quadrangle, are suspected to still contain enormous amounts of water ice. Recent evidence has led many planetary scientists to conclude that water ice still exists as glaciers across much of the Martian mid- and high latitudes, protected from sublimation by thin coverings of insulating rock and/or dust. An example of this are the glacier-like features called lobate debris aprons in an area called Deuteronilus Mensae, which display widespread evidence of ice lying beneath a few meters of rock debris. Glaciers are associated with fretted terrain, and many volcanoes. Researchers have described glacial deposits on Hecates Tholus, Arsia Mons, Pavonis Mons, and Olympus Mons. Glaciers have also been reported in a number of larger Martian craters in the mid-latitudes and above.

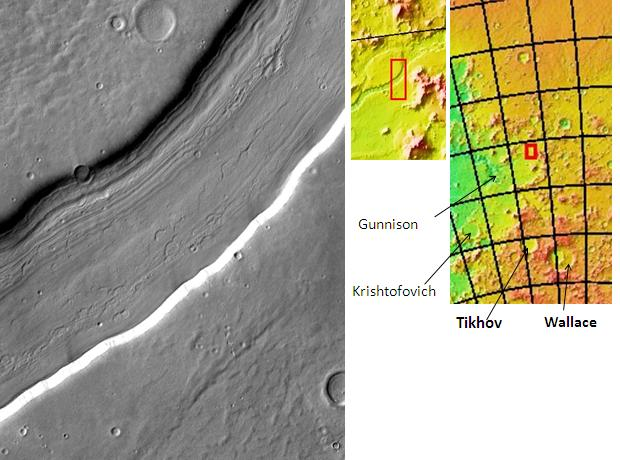
Reull Vallis with lineated floor deposits. Location is Hellas quadrangle.

Glacier-like features on Mars are known variously as viscous flow features, Martian flow features, lobate debris aprons, or lineated valley fill, depending on the form of the feature, its location, the landforms it is associated with, and the author describing it. Many, but not all, small glaciers seem to be associated with gullies on the walls of craters and mantling material. The lineated deposits known as lineated valley fill are probably rock-covered glaciers that are found on the floors of most channels within the fretted terrain found around Arabia Terra in the northern hemisphere. Their surfaces have ridged and grooved materials that deflect around obstacles. Lineated floor deposits may be related to lobate debris aprons, which have been proven to contain large amounts of ice by orbiting radar. For many years, researchers interpreted that features called 'lobate debris aprons' were glacial flows and it was thought that ice existed under a layer of insulating rocks. With new instrument readings, it has been confirmed that lobate debris aprons contain almost pure ice that is covered with a layer of rocks.

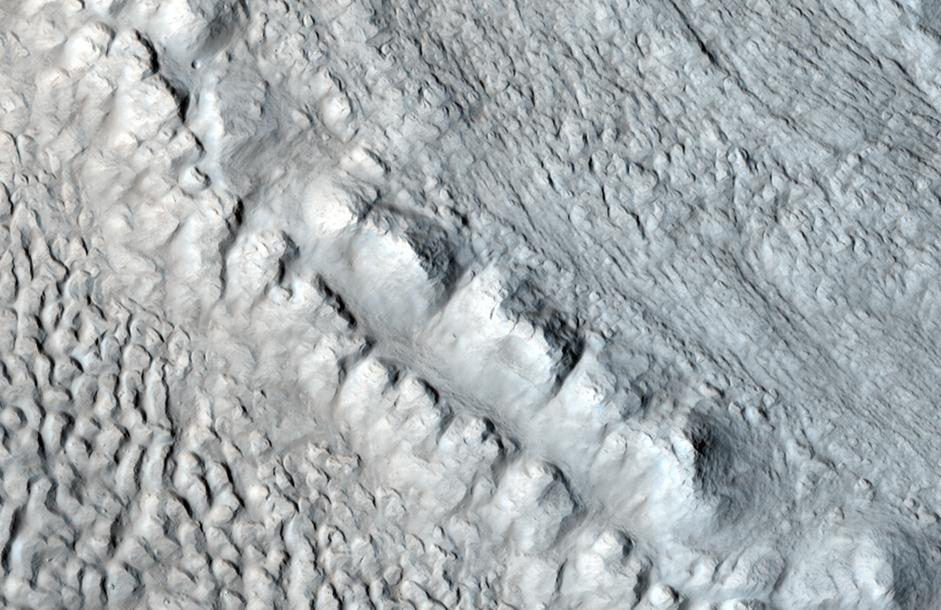
A ridge interpreted as the terminal moraine of an alpine glacier. Location is Ismenius Lacus quadrangle.

Analysis of SHARAD data led researchers to conclude that lobate debris aprons (LDAs) are over 80% pure ice. The paper's authors examined five different sites from around the planet, and all showed high levels of pure water ice. Because of the high purity of the ice content, the authors argued that the formation of glaciers happened by atmospheric precipitation or direct condensation. After glaciers were formed, there was a time when enhanced sublimation formed a lag layer or promoted the accumulation of dry debris atop the water ice glacier. That dry debris would then insulate the underlying ice from going away.

Moving ice carries rock material, then drops it as the ice disappears. This typically happens at the snout or edges of the glacier. On Earth, such features would be called moraines, but on Mars they are typically known as moraine-like ridges, concentric ridges, or arcuate ridges. Since ice tends to sublime rather than melt on Mars, and because Mars's low temperatures tend to make glaciers "cold based" (frozen down to their beds, and unable to slide), the remains of these glaciers and the ridges they leave do not appear the exactly same as normal glaciers on Earth. In particular, Martian moraines tend to be deposited without being deflected by the underlying topography, which is thought to reflect the fact that the ice in Martian glaciers is normally frozen down and cannot slide. Ridges of debris on the surface of the glaciers indicate the direction of ice movement. The surface of some glaciers have rough textures due to sublimation of buried ice. The ice evaporates without melting and leaves behind an empty space. Overlying material then collapses into the void. Sometimes chunks of ice fall from the glacier and get buried in the land surface. When they melt, a more or less round hole remains. Many of these "kettle holes" have been identified on Mars.

Despite strong evidence for glacial flow on Mars, there is little convincing evidence for landforms carved by glacial erosion, e.g., U-shaped valleys, crag and tail hills, arêtes, drumlins. Such features are abundant in glaciated regions on Earth, so their absence on Mars has proven puzzling. The lack of these landforms is thought to be related to the cold-based nature of the ice in most recent glaciers on Mars. Because the solar insolation reaching the planet, the temperature and density of the atmosphere, and the geothermal heat flux are all lower on Mars than they are on Earth, modelling suggests the temperature of the interface between a glacier and its bed stays below freezing and the ice is literally frozen down to the ground. This prevents it from sliding across the bed, which is thought to inhibit the ice's ability to erode the surface.

=== Groundwater and crust ===
In August 2024, researchers reported on a new analysis of seismometer readings suggesting the presence of liquid water, trapped in tiny cracks and pores of rock, deep in the rocky outer crust, at a depth of six to 12 miles (10 to 20 km) below the surface. The data came from NASA's Mars Insight Lander, which recorded four years' of vibrations - Mars quakes - from deep inside the planet.

The research only analyzed the portion of Mars directly below the InSight lander. However, the researchers speculated that if their findings are representative of the rest of Mars, there would be enough water to fill oceans on the planet's surface, covering the entirety of Mars to a depth of 1 mile (1.6 kilometers).

A study from 2021 estimated that, based on observed ratios of deuterium to hydrogen on Mars, between 30 and 99 percent of the water on Mars may be trapped in the crust, mostly in the form of hydrated minerals.

=== Evidence for recent flows ===
Warm-season flows on slope in Newton Crater.

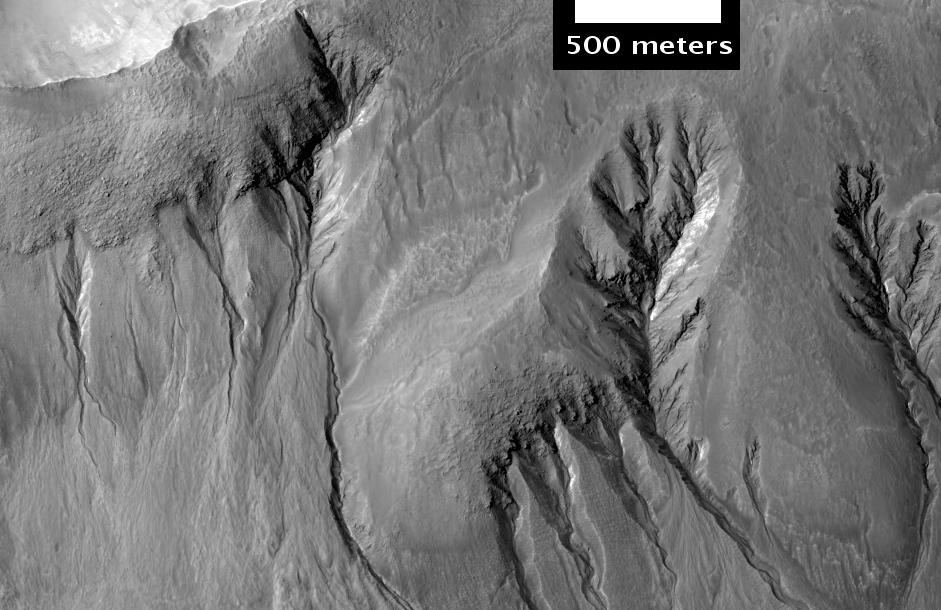
Branched gullies.

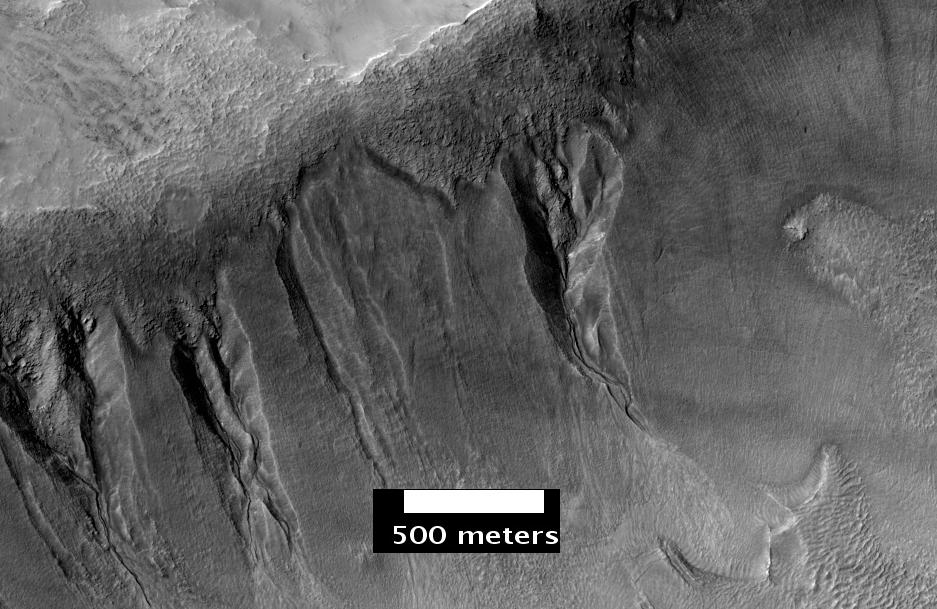
Group of deep gullies.

Pure liquid water cannot exist in a stable form on the surface of Mars with its present low atmospheric pressure and low temperature because it would boil, except at the lowest elevations for a few hours. So, a geological mystery commenced in 2006 when observations from NASA's Mars Reconnaissance Orbiter revealed gully deposits that were not there ten years prior, possibly caused by flowing liquid brine during the warmest months on Mars. The images were of two craters in Terra Sirenum and Centauri Montes that appear to show the presence of flows (wet or dry) on Mars at some point between 1999 and 2001.

There is disagreement in the scientific community as to whether or not gullies are formed by liquid water. While some scientists believe that most gullies are formed by liquid water formed from snow or ice melting, other scientists believe that gullies are formed by dry flows possibly lubricated by sublimating carbon dioxide that forms from freezing of the Martian atmosphere.

Some studies attest that gullies forming in the southern highlands could not be formed by water due to improper conditions. The low pressure, non-geothermal, colder regions would not give way to liquid water at any point in the year but would be ideal for solid carbon dioxide. The carbon dioxide melting in the warmer summer would yield liquid carbon dioxide which would then form the gullies. Even if gullies are carved by flowing water at the surface, the exact source of the water and the mechanisms behind its motion are not understood.

In August 2011, NASA announced the discovery of current seasonal changes on steep slopes below rocky outcrops near crater rims in the Southern hemisphere. These dark streaks, now called recurrent slope lineae (RSL), were seen to grow downslope during the warmest part of the Martian Summer, then to gradually fade through the rest of the year, recurring cyclically between years. The researchers suggested these marks were consistent with salty water (brines) flowing downslope and then evaporating, possibly leaving some sort of residue. The CRISM spectroscopic instrument has since made direct observations of hydrous salts appearing at the same time that these recurrent slope lineae form, confirming in 2015 that these lineae are produced by the flow of liquid brines through shallow soils. The lineae contain hydrated chlorate and perchlorate salts (ClO_{4}^{−}), which contain liquid water molecules. The lineae flow downhill in Martian summer, when the temperature is above −23 °C (−9 °F; 250 K). However, the source of the water remains unknown. However, neutron spectrometer data by the Mars Odyssey orbiter obtained over one decade, was published in December 2017, and shows no evidence of water (hydrogenated regolith) at the active sites, so its authors also support the hypotheses of either short-lived atmospheric water vapour deliquescence, or dry granular flows. They conclude that liquid water on today's Mars may be limited to traces of dissolved moisture from the atmosphere and thin films, which are challenging environments for life as it is currently known.

An alternative scenario is a Knudsen pump effect, from photophoretic when shadows occurs in a granular material. The authors demonstrated that the RSLs stopped at an angle of 28° in Garni crater, in agreement with dry granular avalanche. In addition, the authors pointed out several limitations of the wet hypothesis, such as the fact that the detection of water was only indirect (salt detection but not water).

=== Precipitation ===
Precipitation, most likely consisting of snow made of water ice, was observed to fall from cirrus clouds by the Phoenix lander.

== Development of Mars's water inventory ==
The variation in Mars's surface water content is strongly coupled to the evolution of its atmosphere and may have been marked by several key stages. Head and others put together a detailed history of water on Mars and presented it in March, 2023. In March 2021, researchers reported findings, based on ratios of deuterium to hydrogen, suggesting that a considerable amount of water has likely been sequestered into the rocks and crust of the planet over the years instead of being lost to space.

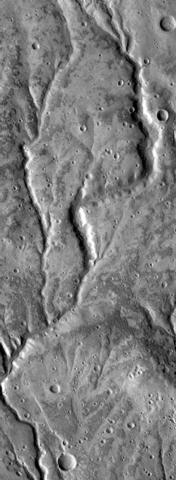
Dry channels near Warrego Valles.

=== Early Noachian era (4.6 Ga to 4.1 Ga) ===
The early Noachian era was characterized by atmospheric loss to space from heavy meteoritic bombardment and hydrodynamic escape. Ejection by meteorites may have removed ~60% of the early atmosphere. Significant quantities of phyllosilicates may have formed during this period requiring a sufficiently dense atmosphere to sustain surface water, as the spectrally dominant phyllosilicate group, smectite, suggests moderate water-to-rock ratios. However, the pH-pCO_{2} between smectite and carbonate show that the precipitation of smectite would constrain pCO_{2} to a value not more than 1×10^{−2} atm (1.0 kPa). As a result, the dominant component of a dense atmosphere on early Mars becomes uncertain, if the clays formed in contact with the Martian atmosphere, particularly given the lack of evidence for carbonate deposits. An additional complication is that the ~25% lower brightness of the young Sun would have required an ancient atmosphere with a significant greenhouse effect to raise surface temperatures to sustain liquid water. Higher CO_{2} content alone would have been insufficient, as CO_{2} precipitates at partial pressures exceeding 1.5 atm (1,500 hPa), reducing its effectiveness as a greenhouse gas.

=== Middle to late Noachian era (4.1 Ga to 3.8 Ga) ===
During the middle to late Noachian era, Mars underwent potential formation of a secondary atmosphere by outgassing dominated by the Tharsis volcanoes, including significant quantities of H_{2}O, CO_{2}, and SO_{2}. Martian valley networks date to this period, indicating globally widespread and temporally sustained surface water as opposed to catastrophic floods. The end of this period coincides with the termination of the internal magnetic field and a spike in meteoritic bombardment. The cessation of the internal magnetic field and subsequent weakening of any local magnetic fields allowed unimpeded atmospheric stripping by the solar wind. For example, when compared with their terrestrial counterparts, ^{38}Ar/^{36}Ar, ^{15}N/^{14}N, and ^{13}C/^{12}C ratios of the Martian atmosphere are consistent with ~60% loss of Ar, N_{2}, and CO_{2} by solar wind stripping of an upper atmosphere enriched in the lighter isotopes via Rayleigh fractionation. Supplementing the solar wind activity, impacts would have ejected atmospheric components in bulk without isotopic fractionation. Nevertheless, cometary impacts in particular may have contributed volatiles to the planet.

=== Hesperian to Amazonian era (present) (~3.8 Ga to present) ===
Atmospheric enhancement by sporadic outgassing events were countered by solar wind stripping of the atmosphere, albeit less intensely than by the young Sun. Catastrophic floods date to this period, favoring sudden subterranean release of volatiles, as opposed to sustained surface flows. While the earlier portion of this era may have been marked by aqueous acidic environments and Tharsis-centric groundwater discharge dating to the late Noachian, much of the surface alteration processes during the latter portion is marked by oxidative processes including the formation of Fe^{3+} oxides that impart a reddish hue to the Martian surface. Such oxidation of primary mineral phases can be achieved by low-pH (and possibly high temperature) processes related to the formation of palagonitic tephra, by the action of H_{2}O_{2} that forms photochemically in the Martian atmosphere, and by the action of water, none of which require free O_{2}. The action of H_{2}O_{2} may have dominated temporally given the drastic reduction in aqueous and igneous activity in this recent era, making the observed Fe^{3+} oxides volumetrically small, though pervasive and spectrally dominant. Nevertheless, aquifers may have driven sustained, but highly localized surface water in recent geologic history, as evident in the geomorphology of craters such as Mojave. Furthermore, the Lafayette Martian meteorite shows evidence of aqueous alteration as recently as 650 Ma.

Mars before and after/during the 2018 global dust storm

In 2020 scientists reported that Mars's current loss of atomic hydrogen from water is largely driven by seasonal processes and dust storms that transport water directly to the upper atmosphere and that this has influenced the planet's climate likely during the last 1 Ga. More recent studies have suggested that upward propagating atmospheric gravity waves can play an important role during global dust storms in modulating water escape.

==== Ice ages ====
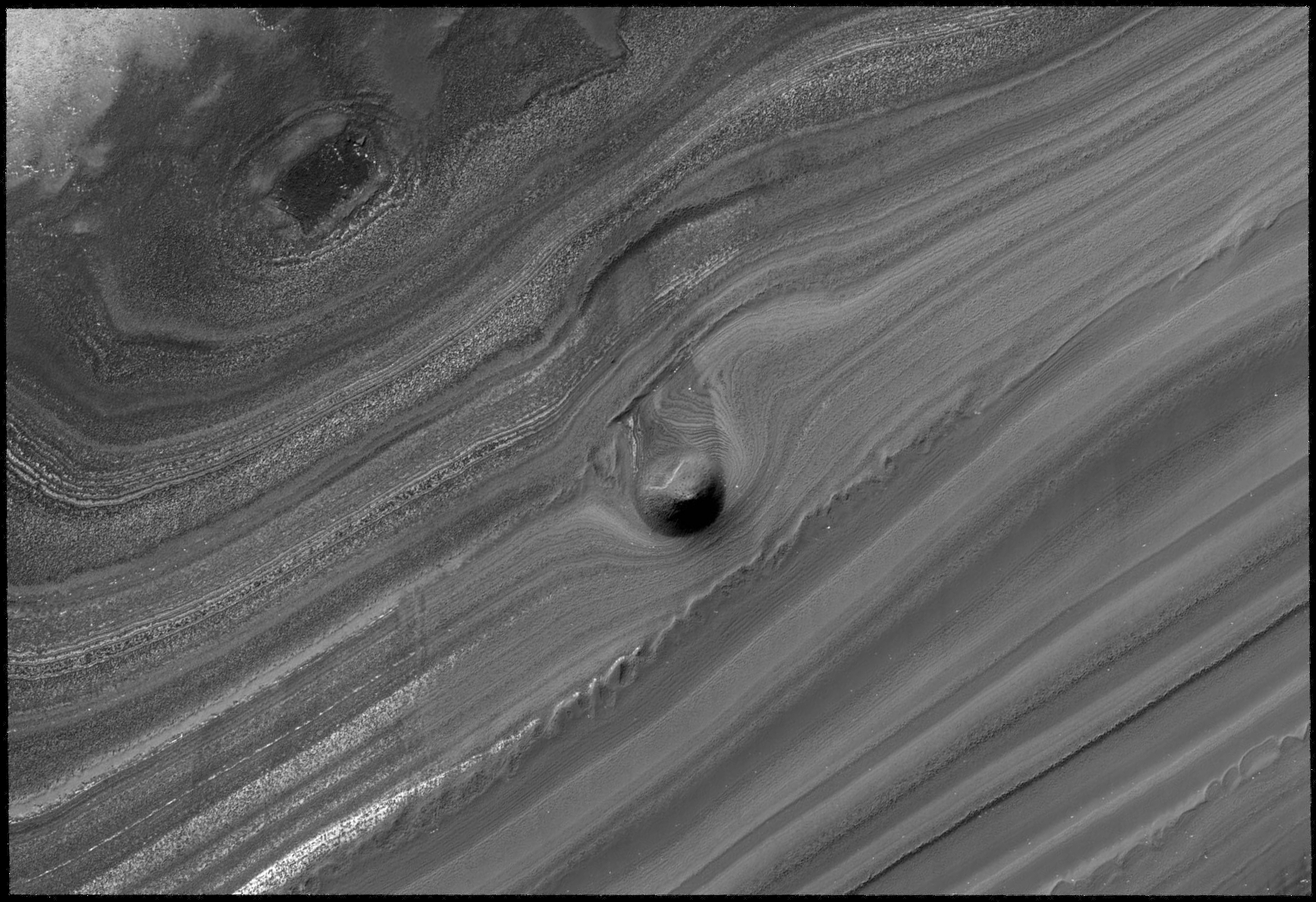
North polar layered deposits of ice and dust.

Mars has experienced about 40 large scale changes in the amount and distribution of ice on its surface over the past five million years, with the most recent happening about 2.1 to 0.4 Myr ago, during the Late Amazonian glaciation at the dichotomy boundary. These changes are known as ice ages. Ice ages on Mars are very different from the ones that the Earth experiences. Ice ages are driven by changes in Mars's orbit and tilt —also known as obliquity. Orbital calculations show that Mars wobbles on its axis far more than Earth does. The Earth is stabilized by its proportionally large moon, so it only wobbles a few degrees. Mars may change its tilt by many tens of degrees. When this obliquity is high, its poles get much more direct sunlight and heat; this causes the ice caps to warm and become smaller as ice sublimes. Adding to the variability of the climate, the eccentricity of the orbit of Mars changes twice as much as Earth's eccentricity. As the poles sublime, the ice is redeposited closer to the equator, which receive somewhat less solar insolation at these high obliquities. Computer simulations have shown that a 45° tilt of the Martian axis would result in ice accumulation in areas that display glacial landforms.

The moisture from the ice caps travels to lower latitudes in the form of deposits of frost or snow mixed with dust. The atmosphere of Mars contains a great deal of fine dust particles, the water vapor condenses on these particles that then fall down to the ground due to the additional weight of the water coating. When ice at the top of the mantling layer returns to the atmosphere, it leaves behind dust that serves to insulate the remaining ice. The total volume of water removed is a few percent of the ice caps, or enough to cover the entire surface of the planet under one meter of water. Much of this moisture from the ice caps results in a thick smooth mantle with a mixture of ice and dust. This ice-rich mantle, that can be 100 meters thick at mid-latitudes, smooths the land at lower latitudes, but in places it displays a bumpy texture or patterns that give away the presence of former water ice underneath.

== Habitability assessments ==
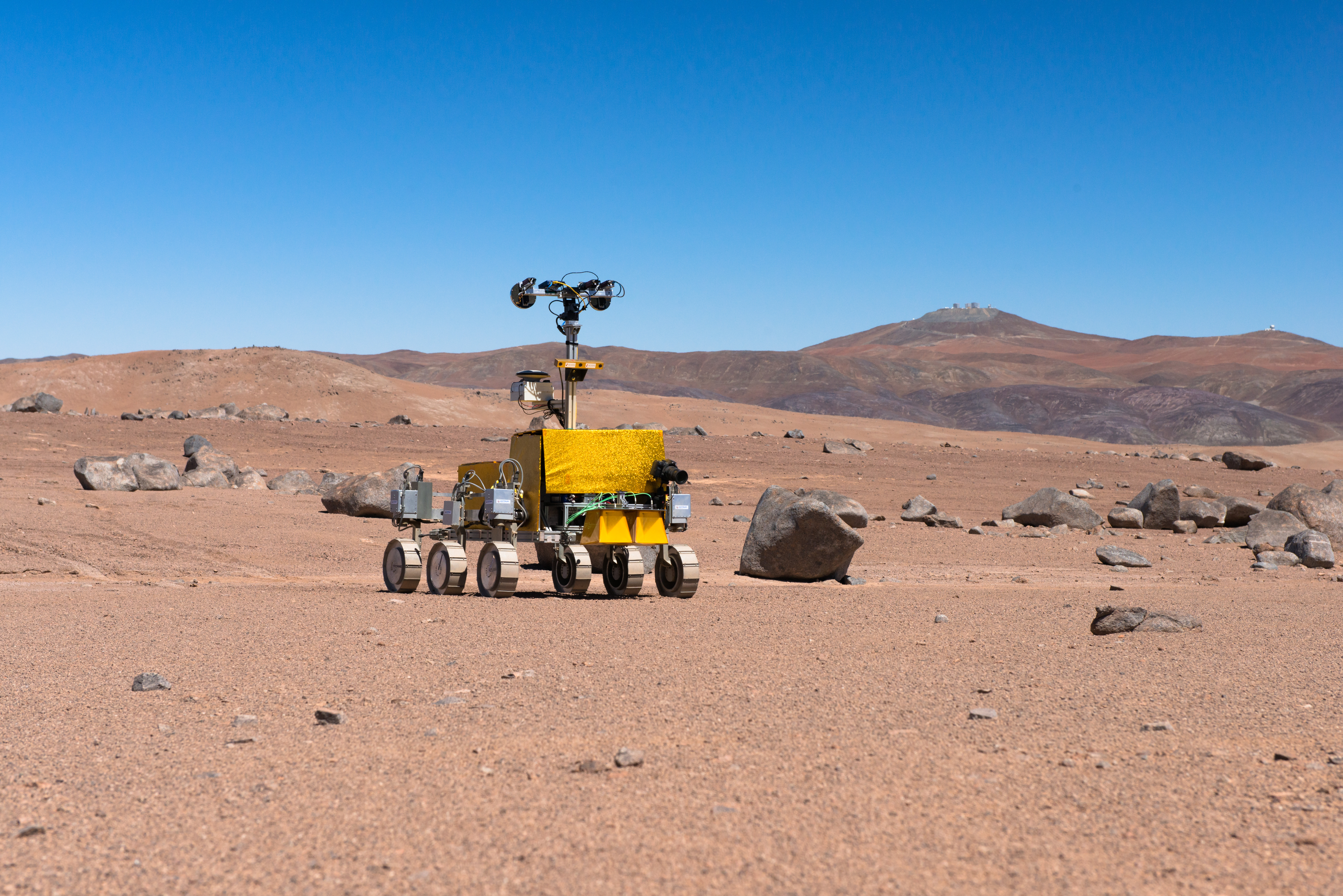
ExoMars rover prototype being tested in the Atacama Desert, 2013.

Since the Viking landers that searched for current microbial life in 1976, NASA has pursued a "follow the water" strategy on Mars. However, liquid water is a necessary but not sufficient condition for life as we know it because habitability is a function of a multitude of environmental parameters.

Habitable environments need not be inhabited, and for purposes of planetary protection, scientists are trying to identify potential habitats where stowaway bacteria from Earth on spacecraft could contaminate Mars. If life exists—or existed—on Mars, evidence or biosignatures could be found in the subsurface, away from present-day harsh surface conditions such as perchlorates, ionizing radiation, desiccation and freezing. Habitable locations could occur kilometers below the surface in a hypothetical hydrosphere, or it could occur near the sub-surface in contact with permafrost.

The Curiosity rover is assessing Mars's past and present habitability potential. The European-Russian ExoMars programme is an astrobiology project dedicated to the search for and identification of biosignatures on Mars. It includes the ExoMars Trace Gas Orbiter that started mapping the atmospheric methane in April 2018, and the planned ExoMars rover that will drill and analyze subsurface samples 2 meters deep. NASA's Perseverance rover has cached samples for their potential transport to Earth laboratories in the late 2020s or 2030s.

== Findings by probes ==
=== Mariner 9 ===
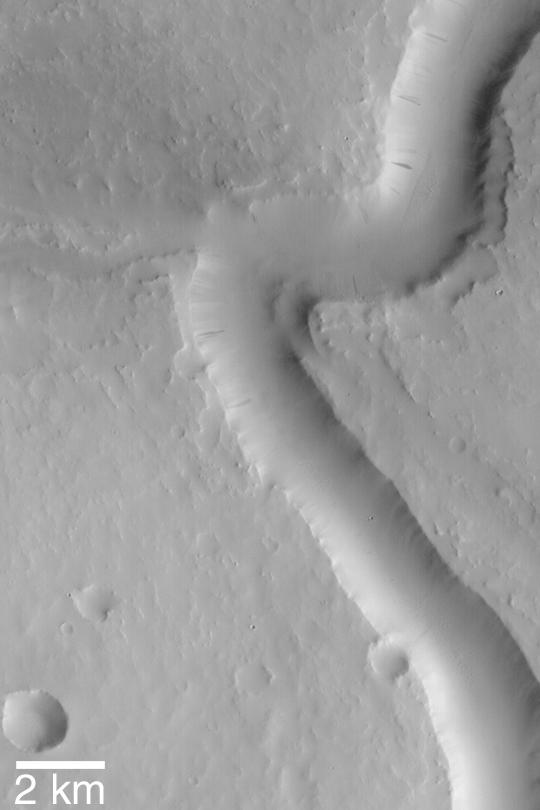
Meander in Scamander Vallis, as seen by Mars Global Surveyor. Such images implied that large amounts of water once flowed on the surface of Mars.

The images acquired by the Mariner 9 Mars orbiter, launched in 1971, revealed the first evidence of past liquid water in the form of dry river beds, canyons (including the Valles Marineris, a system of canyons over about 4,020 kilometres (2,500 mi) long), evidence of water erosion and deposition. The findings from the Mariner 9 missions underpinned the later Viking program. The enormous Valles Marineris canyon system is named after Mariner 9 in honor of its achievements.

=== Viking program ===
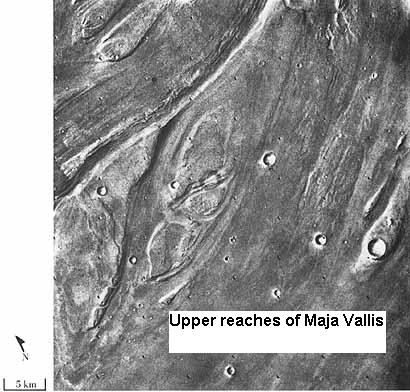
Streamlined islands in Maja Valles suggest that large floods occurred on Mars.

By discovering many geological forms that are typically formed from large amounts of water, the two Viking orbiters and the two landers (1976–1982) caused a revolution in our knowledge about water on Mars. Huge outflow channels were found in many areas. They showed that floods of water broke through dams, carved deep valleys, eroded grooves into bedrock, and traveled thousands of kilometers. Large areas in the southern hemisphere contained branched valley networks, suggesting that rain once fell. Many craters look as if the impactor fell into mud. When they were formed, ice in the soil may have melted, turned the ground into mud, then the mud flowed across the surface. Regions, called "Chaotic Terrain," seemed to have quickly lost great volumes of water that caused large channels to form downstream. Estimates for some channel flows run to ten thousand times the flow of the Mississippi River. Underground volcanism may have melted frozen ice; the water then flowed away and the ground collapsed to leave chaotic terrain. Also, general chemical analysis by the two Viking landers suggested the surface has been either exposed to or submerged in water in the past.

=== Mars Global Surveyor ===
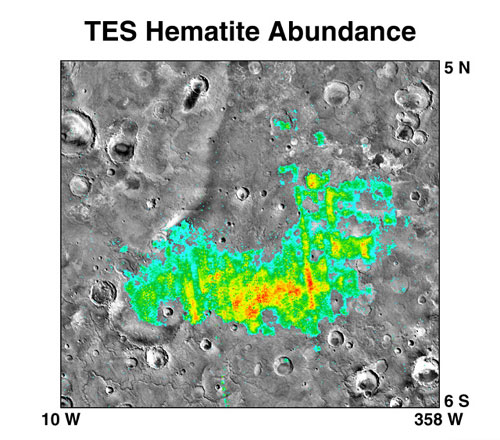
Map showing the distribution of hematite in Sinus Meridiani. This data was used to target the landing of the Opportunity rover that found definite evidence of past water.

In 1998, data from the Mars Orbiter Laser Altimeter of the Mars Global Surveyor orbiter showed that the topography of the northern polar ice cap was consistent with a composition of primarily water ice.

The Mars Global Surveyor's (1996–2006) Thermal Emission Spectrometer (TES) was an instrument able to determine the mineral composition on the surface of Mars. Mineral composition gives information on the presence or absence of water in ancient times. TES identified a large (30,000 square kilometres (12,000 sq mi)) area in the Nili Fossae formation that contains the mineral olivine. It is thought that the ancient asteroid impact that created the Isidis basin resulted in faults that exposed the olivine. The discovery of olivine is strong evidence that parts of Mars have been extremely dry for a long time. Olivine was also discovered in many other small outcrops within 60 degrees north and south of the equator. The probe imaged several channels that suggest past sustained liquid flows, two of them are found in Nanedi Valles and in Nirgal Vallis.

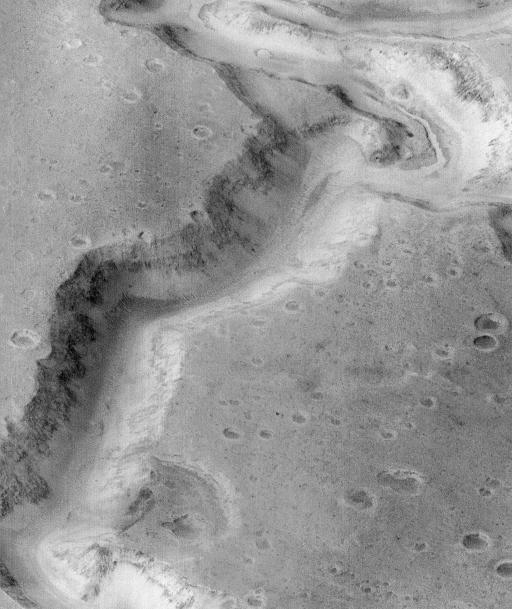
Inner channel (near top of the image) on floor of Nanedi Valles that suggests that water flowed for a fairly long period. Image from Lunae Palus quadrangle.

=== Mars Pathfinder ===
The Pathfinder lander (1997–1998) recorded the variation of diurnal temperature cycle. It was coldest just before sunrise, about −78 °C (−108 °F; 195 K), and warmest just after Mars noon, about −8 °C (18 °F; 265 K). At this location, the highest temperature never reached the freezing point of water (0 °C (32 °F; 273 K)), too cold for pure liquid water to exist on the surface.

The atmospheric pressure measured by the Pathfinder on Mars is very low —about 0.6% of Earth's, and it would not permit pure liquid water to exist on the surface.

Other observations were consistent with water being present in the past. Some of the rocks at the Mars Pathfinder site leaned against each other in a manner geologists term imbricated. It is suspected that strong flood waters in the past pushed the rocks around until they faced away from the flow. Some pebbles were rounded, perhaps from being tumbled in a stream. Parts of the ground are crusty, maybe due to cementing by a fluid containing minerals. There was evidence of clouds and maybe fog.

=== Mars Odyssey ===
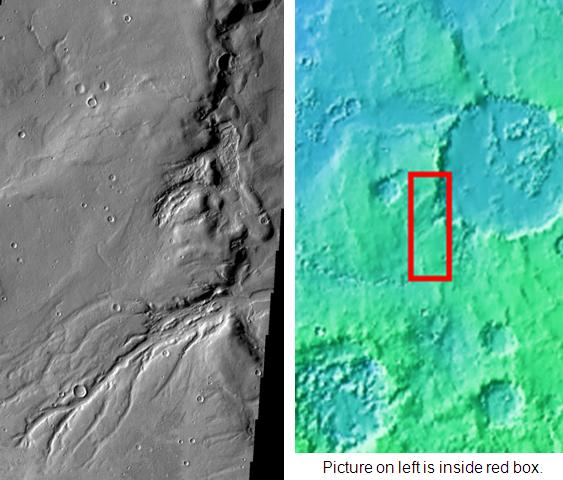
Complex drainage system in Semeykin Crater. Location is Ismenius Lacus quadrangle

The 2001 Mars Odyssey orbiter (2001–present) found much evidence for water on Mars in the form of images, and with its neutron spectrometer, it proved that much of the ground is loaded with water ice. Mars has enough ice just beneath the surface to fill Lake Michigan twice. In both hemispheres, from 55° latitude to the poles, Mars has a high density of ice just under the surface; one kilogram of soil contains about 500 grams (18 oz) of water ice. But close to the equator, there is only 2% to 10% of water in the soil. Scientists think that much of this water is also locked up in the chemical structure of minerals, such as clay and sulfates. Although the upper surface contains a few percent of chemically bound water, ice lies just a few meters deeper, as it has been shown in Arabia Terra, Amazonis quadrangle, and Elysium quadrangle that contain large amounts of water ice. The orbiter also discovered vast deposits of bulk water ice near the surface of equatorial regions. Evidence for equatorial hydration is both morphological and compositional and is seen at both the Medusae Fossae formation and the Tharsis Montes. Analysis of the data suggests that the southern hemisphere may have a layered structure, suggestive of stratified deposits beneath a now extinct large water mass.

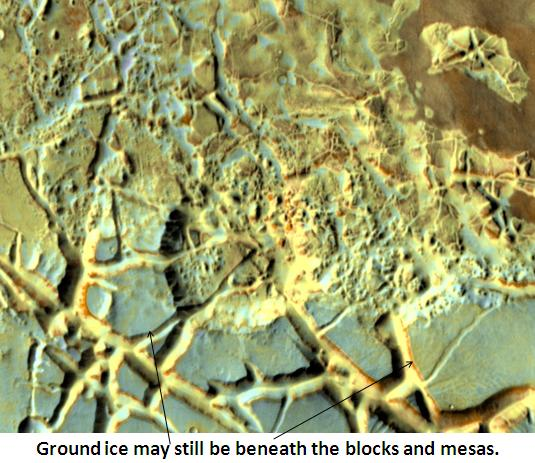
Blocks in Aram showing a possible ancient source of water. Location is Oxia Palus quadrangle.

The instruments aboard the Mars Odyssey are able to study the top meter of soil. In 2002, available data were used to calculate that if all soil surfaces were covered by an even layer of water, this would correspond to a global layer of water (GLW) 0.5–1.5 kilometres (0.31–0.93 mi).

Thousands of images returned from Odyssey orbiter also support the idea that Mars once had great amounts of water flowing across its surface. Some images show patterns of branching valleys; others show layers that may have been formed under lakes; even river and lake deltas have been identified. For many years researchers suspected that glaciers exist under a layer of insulating rocks. Lineated valley fill is one example of these rock-covered glaciers. They are found on the floors of some channels. Their surfaces have ridged and grooved materials that deflect around obstacles. Lineated floor deposits may be related to lobate debris aprons, which have been shown by orbiting radar to contain large amounts of ice.

=== Phoenix ===
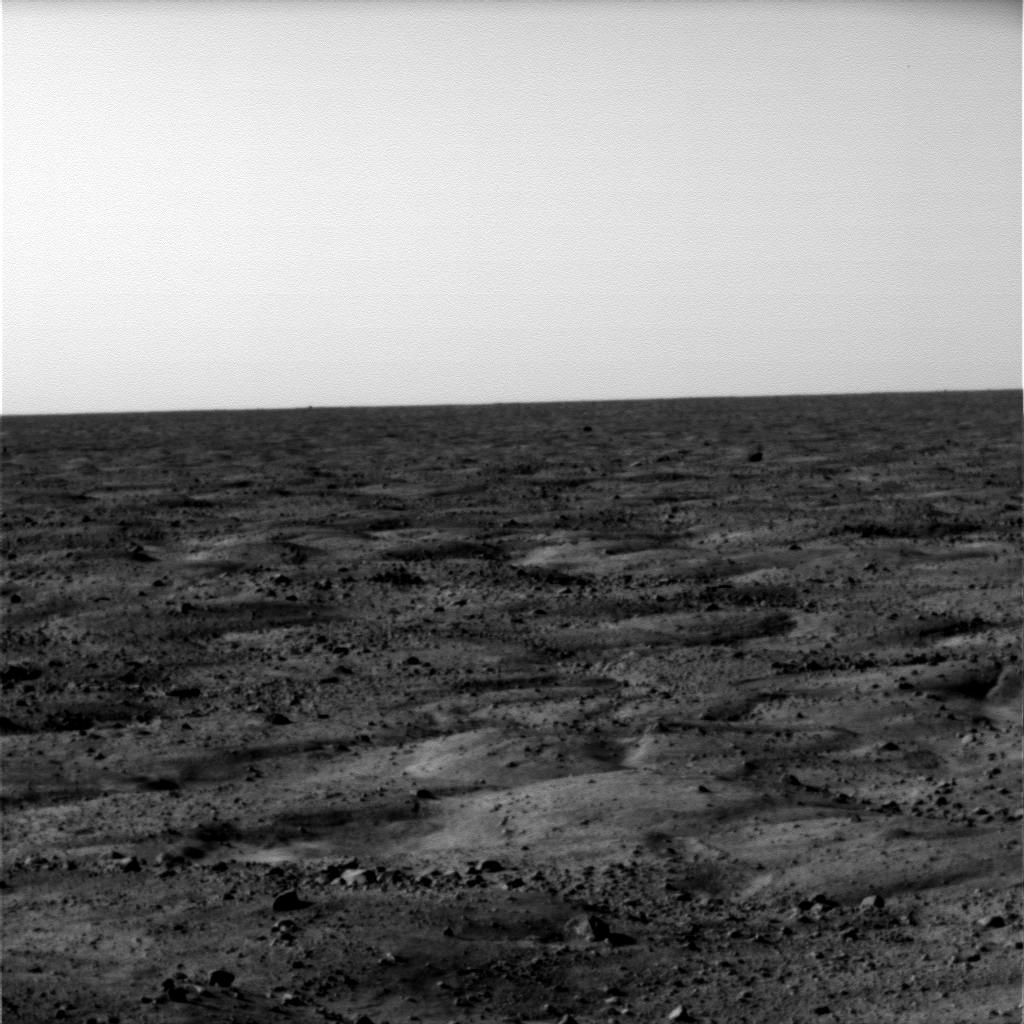
Permafrost polygons imaged by the Phoenix lander.

The Phoenix lander (2008) also confirmed the existence of large amounts of water ice in the northern region of Mars. This finding was predicted by previous orbital data and theory, and was measured from orbit by the Mars Odyssey instruments. On June 19, 2008, NASA announced that dice-sized clumps of bright material in the "Dodo-Goldilocks" trench, dug by the robotic arm, had vaporized over the course of four days, strongly indicating that the bright clumps were composed of water ice that sublimes following exposure. Recent radiative transfer modeling has shown that this water ice was snow with a grain size of ~350 μm with 0.015% dust. Even though CO_{2} (dry ice) also sublimes under the conditions present, it would do so at a rate much faster than observed. On July 31, 2008, NASA announced that Phoenix further confirmed the presence of water ice at its landing site. During the initial heating cycle of a sample, the mass spectrometer detected water vapor when the sample temperature reached 0 °C (32 °F; 273 K). Stable liquid water cannot exist on the surface of Mars with its present low atmospheric pressure and temperature (it would boil), except at the lowest elevations for short periods.

The presence of the perchlorate (ClO_{4}^{–}) anion, a strong oxidizer, in the martian soil was confirmed. This salt can considerably lower the water freezing point.

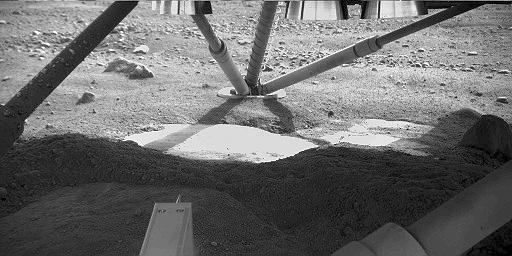
View underneath Phoenix lander showing water ice exposed by the landing retrorockets.

When Phoenix landed, the retrorockets splashed soil and melted ice onto the vehicle. Photographs showed the landing had left blobs of material stuck to the landing struts. The blobs expanded at a rate consistent with deliquescence, darkened before disappearing (consistent with liquefaction followed by dripping), and appeared to merge. These observations, combined with thermodynamic evidence, indicated that the blobs were likely liquid brine droplets. Other researchers suggested the blobs could be "clumps of frost." In 2015 it was confirmed that perchlorate plays a role in forming recurring slope lineae on steep gullies.

For about as far as the camera can see, the landing site is flat, but shaped into polygons between 2–3 metres (6 ft 7 in – 9 ft 10 in) in diameter which are bounded by troughs that are 20–50 centimetres (7.9–19.7 in) deep. These shapes are due to ice in the soil expanding and contracting due to major temperature changes. The microscope showed that the soil on top of the polygons is composed of rounded particles and flat particles, probably a type of clay. Ice is present a few inches below the surface in the middle of the polygons, and along its edges, the ice is at least 8 inches (200 mm) deep.

Snow was observed to fall from cirrus clouds. The clouds formed at a level in the atmosphere that was around −65 °C (−85 °F; 208 K), so the clouds would have to be composed of water-ice, rather than carbon dioxide-ice (CO_{2} or dry ice), because the temperature for forming carbon dioxide ice is much lower than −120 °C (−184 °F; 153 K). As a result of mission observations, it is now suspected that water ice (snow) would have accumulated later in the year at this location. The highest temperature measured during the mission, which took place during the Martian summer, was −19.6 °C (−3.3 °F; 253.6 K), while the coldest was −97.7 °C (−143.9 °F; 175.5 K). So, in this region the temperature remained far below the freezing point (0 °C (32 °F; 273 K)) of water.

=== Spirit and Opportunity Rovers ===
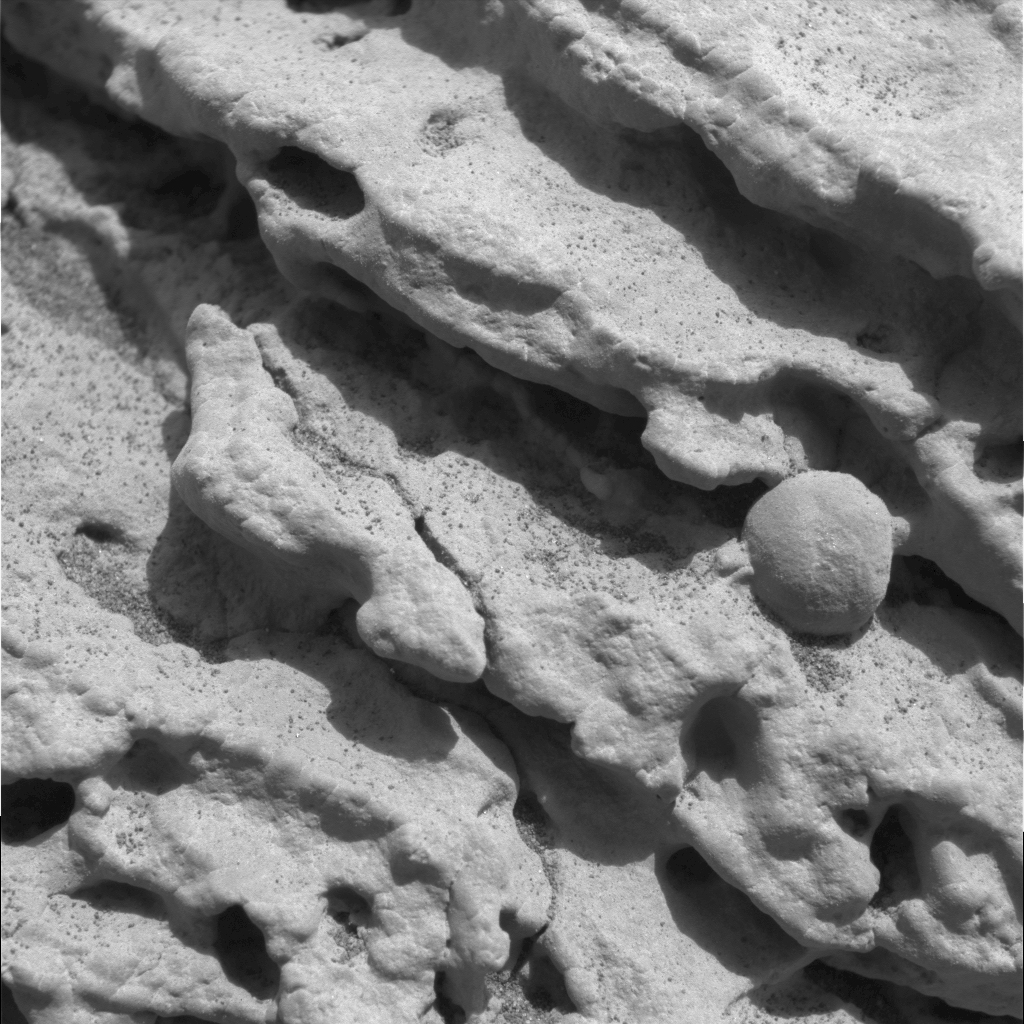
Close-up of a rock outcrop.

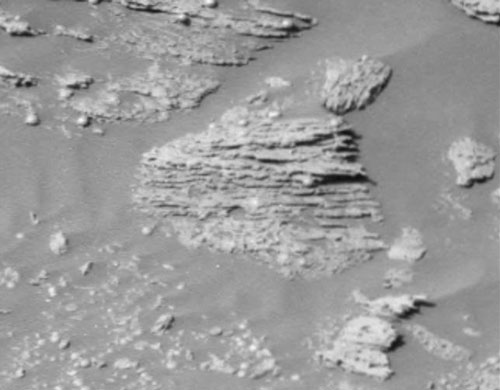
Thin rock layers, not all parallel to each other.

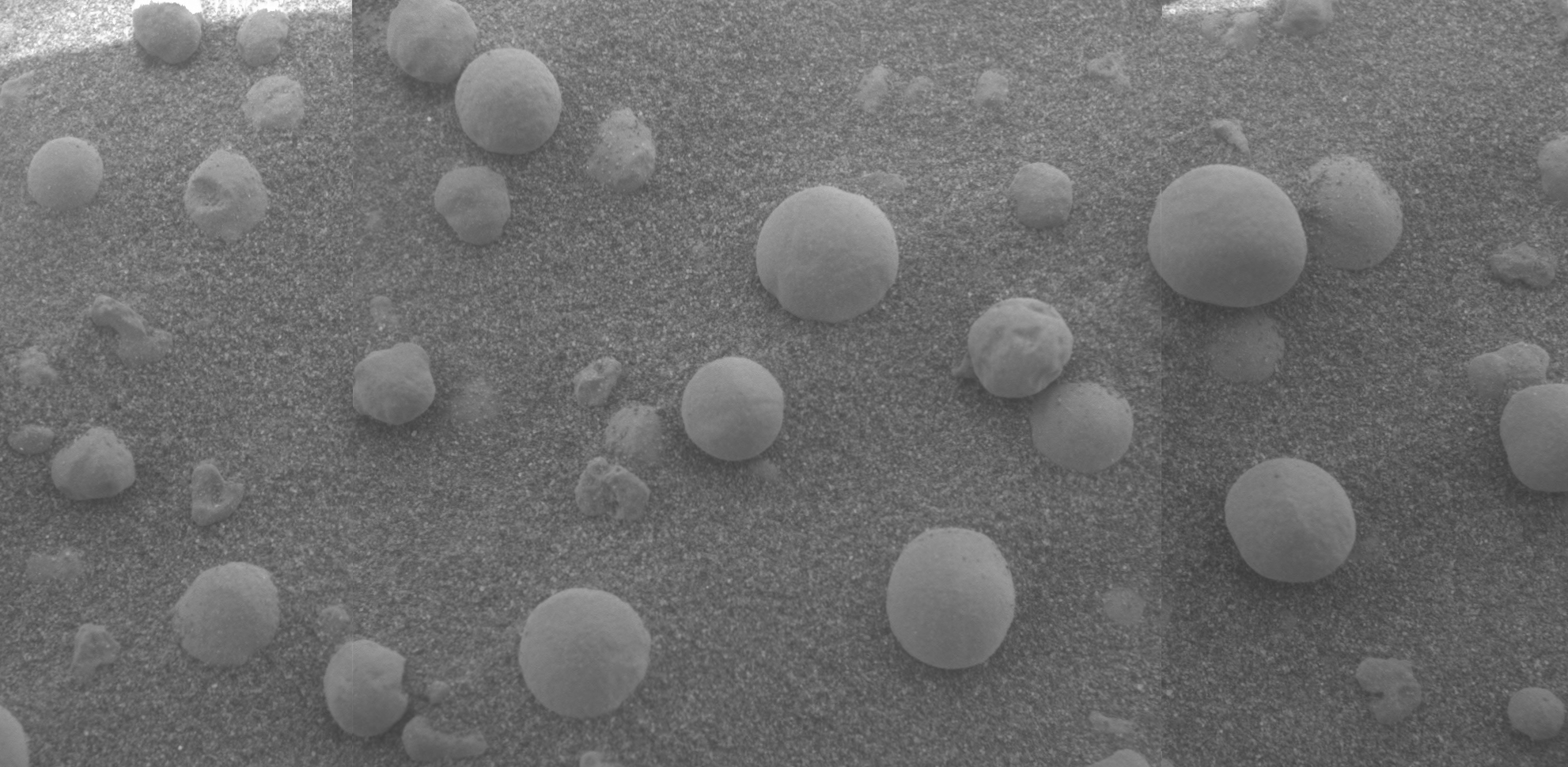
Hematite spherules.

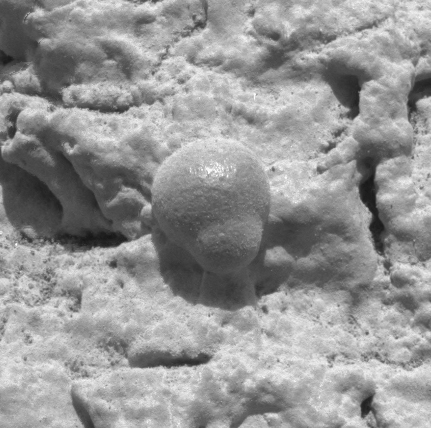
Partly embedded spherules.

The Mars Exploration Rovers, Spirit (2004–2010) and Opportunity (2004–2018) found a great deal of evidence for past water on Mars. The Spirit rover landed in what was thought to be a large lake bed. The lake bed had been covered over with lava flows, so evidence of past water was initially hard to detect. On March 5, 2004, NASA announced that Spirit had found hints of water history on Mars in a rock dubbed "Humphrey".

As Spirit traveled in reverse in December 2007, pulling a seized wheel behind, the wheel scraped off the upper layer of soil, uncovering a patch of white ground rich in silica. Scientists think that it must have been produced in one of two ways. One: hot spring deposits produced when water dissolved silica at one location and then carried it to another (i.e. a geyser). Two: acidic steam rising through cracks in rocks stripped them of their mineral components, leaving silica behind. The Spirit rover also found evidence for water in the Columbia Hills of Gusev crater. In the Clovis group of rocks the Mössbauer spectrometer (MB) detected goethite, that forms only in the presence of water, iron in the oxidized form Fe^{3+}, carbonate-rich rocks, which means that regions of the planet once harbored water.

The Opportunity rover was directed to a site that had displayed large amounts of hematite from orbit. Hematite often forms from water. The rover indeed found layered rocks and marble- or blueberry-like hematite concretions. Elsewhere on its traverse, Opportunity investigated aeolian dune stratigraphy in Burns Cliff in Endurance Crater. Its operators concluded that the preservation and cementation of these outcrops had been controlled by flow of shallow groundwater. In its years of continuous operation, Opportunity sent back evidence that this area on Mars was soaked in liquid water in the past.

The MER rovers found evidence for ancient wet environments that were very acidic. In fact, what Opportunity found evidence of sulfuric acid, a harsh chemical for life. But on May 17, 2013, NASA announced that Opportunity found clay deposits that typically form in wet environments that are near neutral acidity. This find provides additional evidence about a wet ancient environment possibly favorable for life.

On January 24, 2014, researchers reported that current studies on Mars by the Curiosity and Opportunity rovers found evidence of ancient environments which could have been habitable by chemo-litho-autotrophic microorganisms, as well as ancient water, including fluvio-lacustrine environments (plains related to ancient rivers or lakes).

=== Mars Reconnaissance Orbiter ===
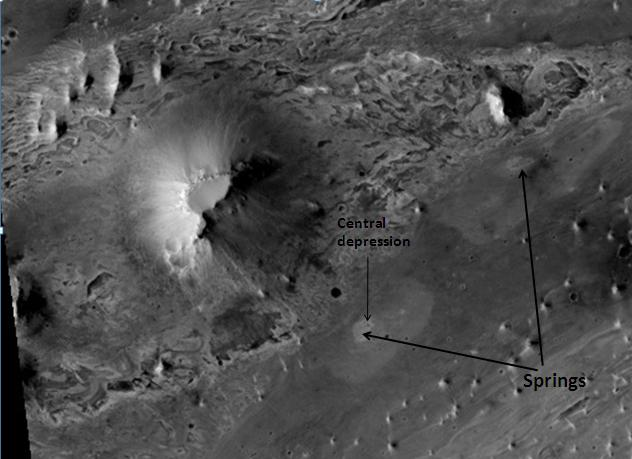
Springs in Vernal Crater, as seen by HIRISE. These springs may be good places to look for evidence of past life, because hot springs can preserve evidence of life forms for a long time. Location is Oxia Palus quadrangle.

The Mars Reconnaissance Orbiter's HiRISE instrument (2006–present) has taken many images that strongly suggest that Mars has had a rich history of water-related processes. A major discovery was finding evidence of ancient hot springs. If they have hosted microbial life, they may contain biosignatures. Research published in January 2010, described strong evidence for sustained precipitation in the area around Valles Marineris. The types of minerals there are associated with water. Also, the high density of small branching channels indicates a great deal of precipitation.

Rocks on Mars have been found to frequently occur as layers, called strata, in many different places. Layers form by various ways, including volcanoes, wind, or water. Light-toned rocks on Mars have been associated with hydrated minerals like sulfates and clay.

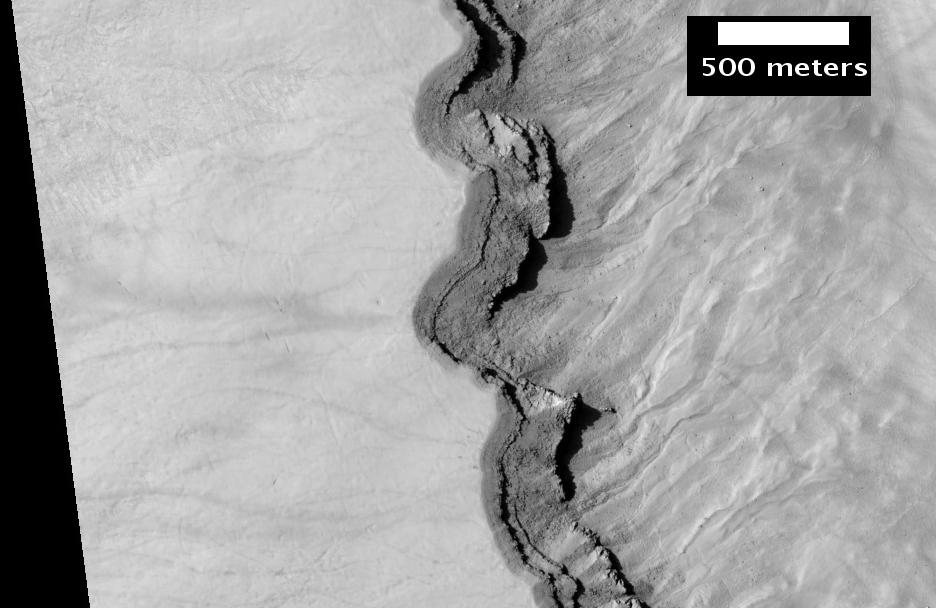
Layers on the west slope of Asimov Crater. Location is Noachis quadrangle.

The orbiter helped scientists determine that much of the surface of Mars is covered by a thick smooth mantle that is thought to be a mixture of ice and dust.

The ice mantle under the shallow subsurface is thought to result from frequent, major climate changes. Changes in Mars's orbit and tilt cause significant changes in the distribution of water ice from polar regions down to latitudes equivalent to Texas. During certain climate periods water vapor leaves polar ice and enters the atmosphere. The water returns to the ground at lower latitudes as deposits of frost or snow mixed generously with dust. The atmosphere of Mars contains a great deal of fine dust particles. Water vapor condenses on the particles, then they fall down to the ground due to the additional weight of the water coating. When ice at the top of the mantling layer goes back into the atmosphere, it leaves behind dust, which insulates the remaining ice.

In 2008, research with the Shallow Radar on the Mars Reconnaissance Orbiter provided strong evidence that the lobate debris aprons (LDA) in Hellas Planitia and in mid northern latitudes are glaciers that are covered with a thin layer of rocks. Its radar also detected a strong reflection from the top and base of LDAs, meaning that pure water ice made up the bulk of the formation. The discovery of water ice in LDAs demonstrates that water is found at even lower latitudes.

Research published in September 2009, demonstrated that some new craters on Mars show exposed, pure water ice. After a time, the ice disappears, evaporating into the atmosphere. The ice is only a few feet deep. The ice was confirmed with the Compact Imaging Spectrometer (CRISM) on board the Mars Reconnaissance Orbiter. Similar exposures of ice have been detected within the mid-latitude mantle (originally proposed to contain buried dusty snow covered with dust and regolith;) that drapes most pole-facing slopes in the mid-latitudes using spectral analysis of HiRISE images.

Additional collaborating reports published in 2019 evaluated the amount of water ice located at the northern pole. One report used data from the MRO's SHARAD (SHAllow RADar sounder) probes. SHARAD has the capability scanning up to about 2 kilometres (1.2 miles) below the surface at 15 metres (49 ft) intervals. The analysis of past SHARAD runs showed evidence of strata of water ice and sand below the Planum Boreum, with as much as 60% to 88% of the volume being water ice. This supports the theory of the long-term global weather of Mars consisting of cycles of global warming and cooling; during cooling periods, water gathered at the poles to form the ice layers, and then as global warming occurred, the unthawed water ice was covered by dust and dirt from Mars's frequent dust storms. The total ice volume determine by this study indicated that there was approximately 2.2×10^{5} cubic kilometres (5.3×10^{4} cu mi), or enough water, if melted, to fully cover the Mars surface with a 1.5 metres (4.9 ft) layer of water. The work was corroborated by a separate study that used recorded gravity data to estimate the density of the Planum Boreum, indicating that on average, it contained up to 55% by volume of water ice.

Many features that look like the pingos on the Earth were found in Utopia Planitia (~35-50° N; ~80-115° E) by examining photos from HiRISE. Pingos contain a core of ice.

=== Curiosity rover ===
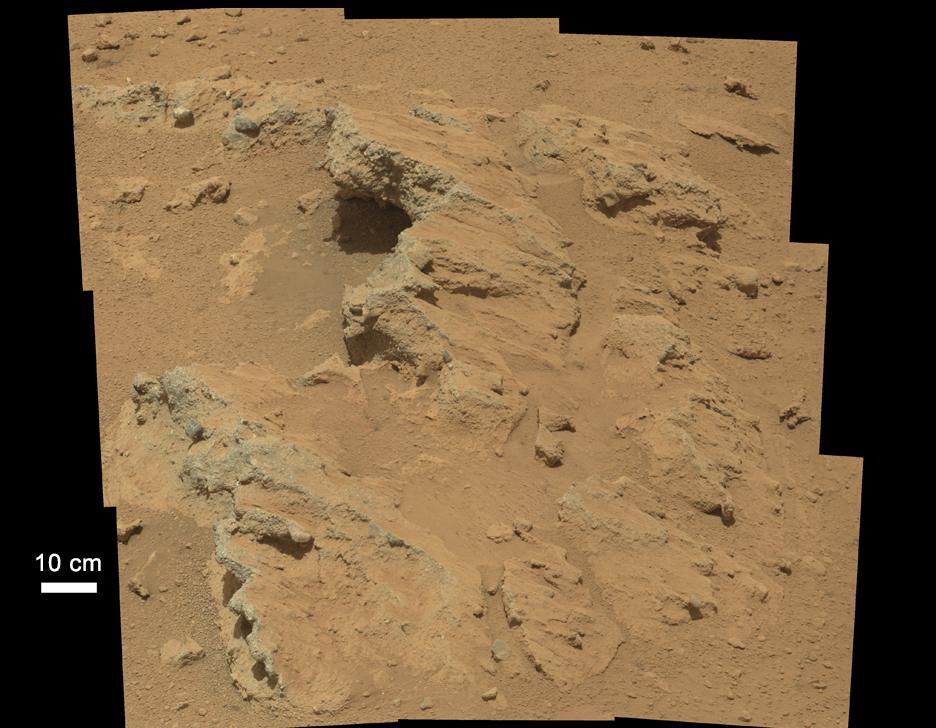
"Hottah" rock outcrop – an ancient streambed discovered by the Curiosity rover team (September 14, 2012) (close-up) (3-D version).

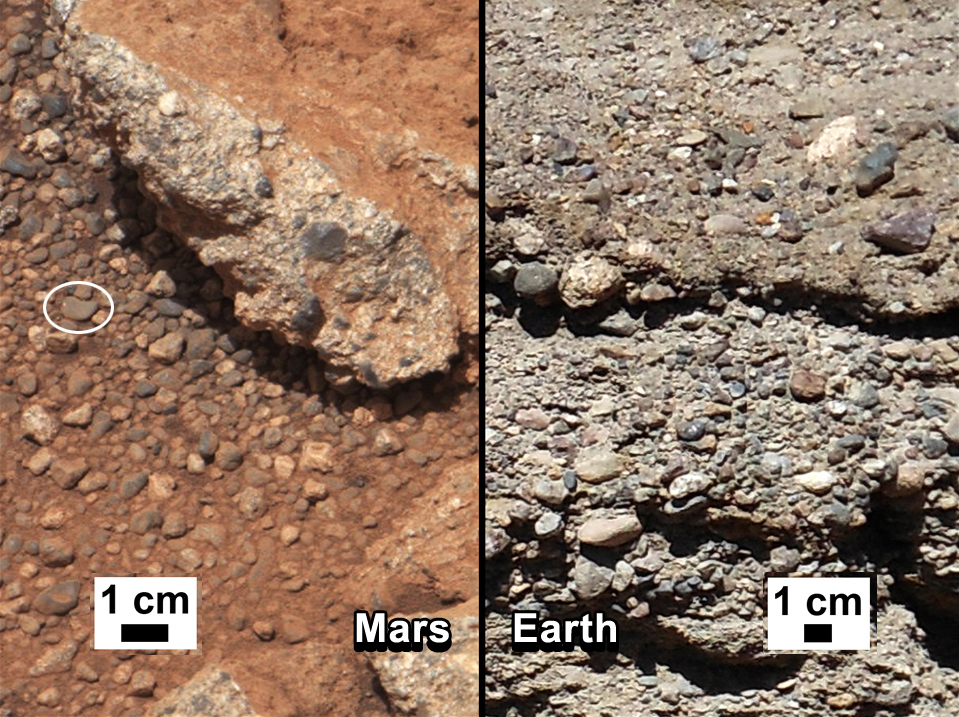
Rock outcrop on Mars – compared with a terrestrial fluvial conglomerate – suggesting water "vigorously" flowing in a stream.

==== Prime mission ====
Early in its mission, NASA's Curiosity rover (2012–present) discovered unambiguous fluvial sediments on Mars. The properties of the pebbles in these outcrops suggested former vigorous flow on a streambed, with flow between ankle- and waist-deep. These rocks were found at the foot of an alluvial fan system descending from the crater wall, which had previously been identified from orbit.

In October 2012, the first X-ray diffraction analysis of a Martian soil was performed by Curiosity. The results revealed the presence of several minerals, including feldspar, pyroxenes and olivine, and suggested that the Martian soil in the sample was similar to the weathered basaltic soils of Hawaiian volcanoes. The sample used is composed of dust distributed from global dust storms and local fine sand. So far, the materials Curiosity has analyzed are consistent with the initial ideas of deposits in Gale Crater recording a transition through time from a wet to dry environment.

In December 2012, NASA reported that Curiosity performed its first extensive soil analysis, revealing the presence of water molecules, sulfur and chlorine in the Martian soil. And in March 2013, NASA reported evidence of mineral hydration, likely hydrated calcium sulfate, in several rock samples including the broken fragments of "Tintina" rock and "Sutton Inlier" rock as well as in veins and nodules in other rocks like "Knorr" rock and "Wernicke" rock. Analysis using the rover's DAN instrument provided evidence of subsurface water, amounting to as much as 4% water content, down to a depth of 60 cm (2.0 ft), in the rover's traverse from the Bradbury Landing site to the Yellowknife Bay area in the Glenelg terrain.

On September 26, 2013, NASA scientists reported the Mars Curiosity rover detected abundant chemically bound water (1.5 to 3 weight percent) in soil samples at the Rocknest region of Aeolis Palus in Gale Crater using mass spectrometry. One of the study's authors stated that this was equivalent to about 2 pints (1.1 liters) of water per cubic foot (28.3 liters) of soil. In addition, NASA reported the rover found two principal soil types: a fine-grained mafic type and a locally derived, coarse-grained felsic type. The mafic type, similar to other martian soils and martian dust, was associated with hydration of the amorphous phases of the soil. Also, perchlorates, the presence of which may make detection of life-related organic molecules difficult, were found at the Curiosity rover landing site (and earlier at the more polar site of the Phoenix lander) suggesting a "global distribution of these salts". NASA also reported that Jake M rock, a rock encountered by Curiosity on the way to Glenelg, was a mugearite and very similar to terrestrial mugearite rocks.

On December 9, 2013, NASA reported that Mars once had a large freshwater lake inside Gale Crater, that could have been a hospitable environment for microbial life.

On January 24, 2014, researchers reported that current studies on Mars by the Curiosity and Opportunity rovers found evidence of ancient environments which could have been habitable by chemo-litho-autotrophic microorganisms, as well as ancient water, including fluvio-lacustrine environments (plains related to ancient rivers or lakes).

==== Extended missions ====
On December 16, 2014, NASA reported detecting an unusual increase, then decrease, in the amounts of methane in the atmosphere near the rover; also, based on deuterium to hydrogen ratio studies, in 3 billion year old clays, much of the water at Gale Crater on Mars was found to have been lost during ancient times, before the lake bed in the crater was formed; afterwards, large amounts of water continued to be lost.

On April 13, 2015, Nature published an analysis of humidity and ground temperature data collected by Curiosity, showing that ambient conditions could allow transient films of liquid brine water to form in the upper 5 cm of Mars's subsurface at night. Such a brine would not allow for reproduction or metabolism of known terrestrial microorganisms.

On October 8, 2015, NASA confirmed that lakes and streams existed in Gale crater 3.3 – 3.8 billion years ago delivering sediments to build up the lower layers of Mount Sharp.

On November 4, 2018, geologists presented evidence, based on studies in Gale Crater by the Curiosity rover, that there was abundant water on early Mars including large floods at Gale Crater.

=== Mars Express ===
The Mars Express Orbiter (2004–present), launched by the European Space Agency, has been mapping the surface of Mars and investigating the subsurface. Between 2012 and 2015, the Orbiter scanned the area beneath the ice caps on the Planum Australe using radar, finding a possible subglacial lake about 20 kilometres (12 mi) wide. The top of the potential lake would be located 1.5 kilometres (0.93 mi) under the glacier; however, this interpretation is controversial.

=== Zhurong Rover ===
China's Zhurong rover (2021–2022) touched down on Mars in Utopia Planitia on May 14, 2021. Its six scientific instruments included two panoramic cameras, a ground-penetrating radar and a magnetic field detector. Zhurong used a laser to zap rocks to study their compositions.

Zhurong found evidence of water when it examined the crust at the surface, called "duricrust." The crust contained hydrated sulfate/silica materials in the Amazonian-age terrain of the landing site. The duricrust may have been produced either by subsurface ice melting or groundwater rising.

Looking at the dunes at Zhurong's landing site, researchers found a large shift in wind direction (as evidenced in the dune directions) that occurred about the same time that layers in the Martian northern ice caps changed. It was suggested that these events happened when the rotational tilt of the planet changed.

=== InSight ===
In 2024, researchers published data recorded by NASA's InSight lander (2018–2022) which suggested the presence of groundwater on Mars. The data consisted of measurements of seismic waves from Marsquakes made by InSight's seismometer. At the area it was measuring, it is estimated that there is water 7 to 13 miles beneath the surface of Mars. It is estimated that if the small area observed by InSight is representative of all other areas of Mars, the volume of groundwater on Mars would be enough to cover all of Mars's surface with a layer of water between 0.62 and 1.24 miles deep.

== See also ==
- Atmospheric water on Mars – Gas layer surrounding Mars
- Climate of Mars
- Colonization of Mars
- Evolution of water on Mars and Earth
- Extraterrestrial liquid water – Liquid water naturally occurring outside Earth
- Lakes on Mars – Former bodies of water on Mars
- Life on Mars – Assessments of possible life on Mars
- Mars Express § Scientific discoveries and important events
- Mars Global Surveyor § Evidence for water on Mars
- Martian canals – Erroneous idea of canals on Mars
- Mud cracks on Mars – Geological feature of the planet Mars

== Bibliography ==
- Boyce, Joseph, M. (2008). The Smithsonian Book of Mars; Konecky & Konecky: Old Saybrook, CT, ISBN 978-1-58834-074-0
- Carr, Michael, H. (1996). Water on Mars; Oxford University Press: New York, ISBN 0-19-509938-9.
- Carr, Michael, H. (2006). The Surface of Mars; Cambridge University Press: Cambridge, UK, ISBN 978-0-521-87201-0.
- Hartmann, William, K. (2003). A Traveler's Guide to Mars: The Mysterious Landscapes of the Red Planet; Workman: New York, ISBN 0-7611-2606-6.
- Hanlon, Michael (2004). The Real Mars: Spirit, Opportunity, Mars Express and the Quest to Explore the Red Planet; Constable: London, ISBN 1-84119-637-1.
- Kargel, Jeffrey, S. (2004). Mars: A Warmer Wetter Planet; Springer-Praxis: London, ISBN 1-85233-568-8.
- Morton, Oliver (2003). Mapping Mars: Science, Imagination, and the Birth of a World; Picador: New York, ISBN 0-312-42261-X.
- Sheehan, William (1996). The Planet Mars: A History of Observation and Discovery; University of Arizona Press: Tucson, AZ, ISBN 0-8165-1640-5.
- Viking Orbiter Imaging Team (1980). Viking Orbiter Views of Mars, C.R. Spitzer, Ed.; NASA SP-441: Washington DC.
