= Alberdi Department =

- Department
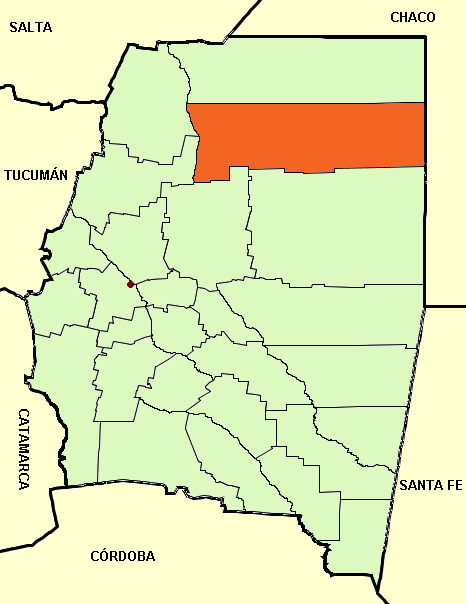
- Location of Alberdi Department within Santiago del Estero Province
- Coordinates (Campo Gallo): 26°35′2″S 62°50′50″W
- Country: Argentina
- Province: Santiago del Estero
- Head town: Campo Gallo

Area
  - Total: 13,507 km^{2} (5,215 sq mi)

Population (2001)
  - Total: 15,617
  - Density: 1.1562/km^{2} (2.9946/sq mi)
- Time zone: UTC-3 (ART)

Alberdi Department is a department of Santiago del Estero Province, Argentina in the region of the Chaco Santiagueño. It is bordered on the north by Copo Department, on the east by Chaco Province, on the south by Moreno Department and Figueroa Department, and on the west by the Salado River which separates it from the Jiménez Department and Pellegrini Department. Its head town is Campo Gallo.

The department was created by provincial law No. 782, which was adopted on June 27, 1921, which modified the law No. 353 and dividing Copo Department to create Alberdi Department.

Article 2: Alberdi is denominated as the department within the following borders: to the north, the parallel of Santo Domingo of latitude 26º13’25’’, the dividing line with Copo Department; to the east, the meridian 61º43’21’’ West of Greenwich, the dividing line with the Chaco Territory; to the south, the current border of Copo Department which separates it from Moreno Department; and to the west, the Salado River which separates it from Pellegrini and Jiménez Departments, with an area of 13,140 square kilometers.

== Other cities and towns ==
- Agustina Libarona
- Coronel Manuel Leoncio Rico
- El Setenta
- Huachana
- Las Carpas
- San Gregorio
- Villa Palmar
