= Guasayán =

Guasayán might refer to:

- Guasayán Department in Santiago del Estero Province, Argentina
  - San Pedro de Guasayán, capital of the forementioned department.
