= La Loma, Santiago =

Coordinates: 27°43′S 63°33′W

La Loma
- Municipality and town
- Interactive map of La Loma
- Country: Argentina
- Province: Santiago del Estero Province
- Department: Figueroa
- Time zone: UTC−3 (ART)

La Loma is a town and municipality within the Figueroa Department of Santiago del Estero Province in northwestern Argentina.

== See also ==
- La Loma, Catamarca
