= Loreto Department =

Department of Argentina in Santiago del Estero Province

Coordinates: 28.3022°S 64.1789°W

- Department
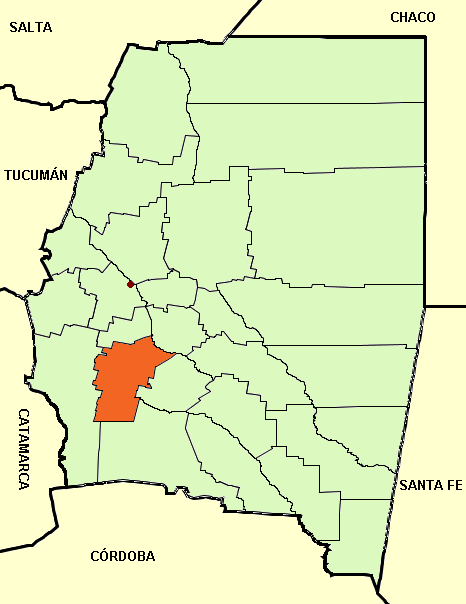
- Location of Loreto Department within Santiago del Estero Province
- Country: Argentina
- Province: Santiago del Estero
- Capital: Loreto
- Time zone: ART

Loreto Department is a department of Argentina in Santiago del Estero Province. The capital city of the department is Loreto.

== Villages ==
- Ayuncha
- Tío Pozo
