= San Martín Department =

San Martín Department may refer to:

- In Argentina:
  - San Martín Department, Corrientes
  - San Martín Department, Mendoza
  - San Martín Department, San Juan
  - San Martín Department, Santiago del Estero
  - San Martín Department, Santa Fe
- In Peru:
  - San Martín Department, Peru
