= Belgrano Department =

Belgrano Department may refer to:

- Belgrano Department, San Luis
- Belgrano Department, Santa Fe
- Belgrano Department, Santiago del Estero
