= Rividavia Department =

Rividavia Department may refer to:

- Rivadavia Department, Mendoza
- Rivadavia Department, Salta
- Rivadavia Department, San Juan
- Rivadavia Department, Santiago
