= Ayuncha =

Coordinates: 28°27′S 64°05′W

- Municipality and village
- Interactive map of Ayuncha
- Country: Argentina
- Province: Santiago del Estero
- Time zone: UTC−3 (ART)

Ayuncha is a municipality and village in the Loreto Department in the Province of Santiago del Estero in Argentina. It is located 30 kilometers from Loreto, on Provincial Road 159, which provides access to the towns of Villa Atamisqui and Estación Atamisqui.

== Facilities ==
Ayuncha has a police station, a health post and School No. 969 (Divino Niño Jesús). It was one of the posts on the path to Upper Peru.
