= Julio Carreras =

Argentine author and former guerrilla fighter

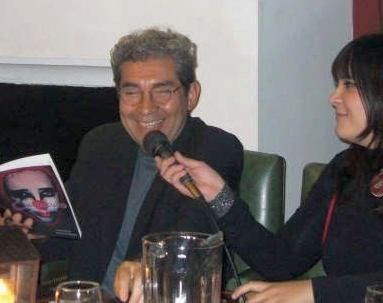
Julio Carreras (h)

Julio Carreras (h) (born August 19, 1949) is an Argentine author of 12 books and former guerrilla fighter.

Born in San Pedro de Guasayán, Santiago del Estero, he studied piano, guitar and the plastic arts from the age of 4 till 14, when he began playing the electric guitar in rock bands.

In 1972 he founded the artists' movement SER, which brought about the Primer Recital de Rock Nacional del Noroeste Argentino (July 1, 1972). His fiancée, Clara Ledesma Medina, was the core of this important movement. With this group, they published a magazine and with their many young adherents they turned to literacy work in poor neighborhoods.

January 6, 1973 Clara died. The young writer, on the verge of suicide, went to Córdoba where he began to work as a journalist for the magazines Posición, Patria Nueva, and as correspondent for the daily El Mundo of Buenos Aires. With his new fiancée, he became a militant in the Ejército Revolucionario del Pueblo (ERP, "People's Revolutionary Army, associated with the Partido Revolucionario de los Trabajadores — PRT, "Workers' Revolutionary Party") in 1972.

At this time he was already a fugitive from the police, after an assault on the military barracks of Villa María. That same year Julio married Gloria Gallegos, also militant of PRT-ERP. In August 1975 his first daughter Anahí was born. At about this time, the writer became political leader of the PRT and military leader of the ERP in the zone Este de Córdoba (Department of San Justo). In January 1976 he fell into the hands of the police; his wife was also detained while looking for a lawyer.

During this period the Argentine government was undertaking the systematic massacre of guerrillas, unionists, university leaders, and political militants known as the Dirty War. Carreras and his wife were miraculously saved by having been arrested just before the military coup, but were brutally tortured. They also survived eight months of internment in a concentration camp.

In 1981 Gloria was freed; Carreras was freed in 1982. Shortly afterwards he was summoned by the bishopric of Mailín to paint 31 gigantic murals in a sanctuary constructed in the middle of the desert. This commission gave him the money to buy his first home.

Because of the torture and detention he suffered under the military dictatorship in Argentina, was compensated in 1994 by an opinion of the International Tribunal in The Hague.

Carreras worked as director of the cultural section of the daily El Liberal in Santiago del Estero, and contributed pieces to several magazines in Argentina and abroad.

Julio Carreras (h) also founded the Asociación de Periodistas de Internet (2000). He is a member of the Grupo de Reflexión Rural (GRR) and of INIsmo (an international avant-garde artistic current founded in Paris in 1980. Some of his principal books are: El Jinete Oscuro, Abelardo, El Malamor, cueRtos, Ciclo de Anton Tapia, Vidas de Cain, El misterio del mal, Bertozzi, Fulgor de los damascos, Un largo adiós.

== Some opinions about the work of Carreras ==
"The Malamor gathers stories that move the story fluently testimonial fantastic realism. Some of these 28 stories (which include" The Marriage ") recreates an infinite present accurate as illogical us into the unsettling whirl of dreams" . Enrique Butti, newspaper El Litoral, Santa Fe, Culture section (on storybook The Malamor, editorial Quipu, 1992).

For its part, Patricia Iezzi, who made his PhD thesis on "Poetics and Poetry of Julio Carreras (h) for the Facoltà 'di Lingue e Letterature Straniera - University of Pescara, Italy, says:" One of the stories arouses more wonder is the "Black Hand Chusa" irony, exhibitionism, boastfulness eccentricity and decorate to this character with the withered hand, Uta, who had been in the Salamanca and must address a series of surreal events and unbelievable situations. Impacts the universality of this story. "

Sergio de Agostino, and Mestre Doutor em Espanhola Literature and Hispanic-American University of São Paulo, Brazil, he said, also on the Malamor: "I was struck by his very tight language proficiency at a time when the majority does not value due to the shape and thus sacrifice style. "

Racing This book has also awakened thoughts of Bachelor of Arts Univ NY Jorge Covarrubias, Newspaper Editor for Latin America at Associated Press International. Covarrubias said in a lengthy commentary which we extract a few paragraphs:

"The Malamor I felt awful. It made me remember the movie Cat People, with that mixture of sensuality and fierceness within a fantasy.

Black chusa hand is the classic descent into hell, with the submission to demanding tests, which ends with the utmost simplicity to round out the earthy anecdote. (...)

The idiot reminds me of a Borges story in which innocence personified destroys his benefactor.

Man one time is one of the most successful. Wonderful sense of mystery and development, symbolized and frozen in an expression in a photograph. (...)

I leave for the final Fog in the trees because, obviously in my opinion is the best. I loved its atmosphere of mystery surround suggestive. Reminded me of Howard Phillips Lovecraft and still has some of Henry James ... "(Taken from Wikipedia in Spanish)
