= Monte Quemado =

Coordinates: 25°48′13″S 62°49′49″W

- Municipality and village
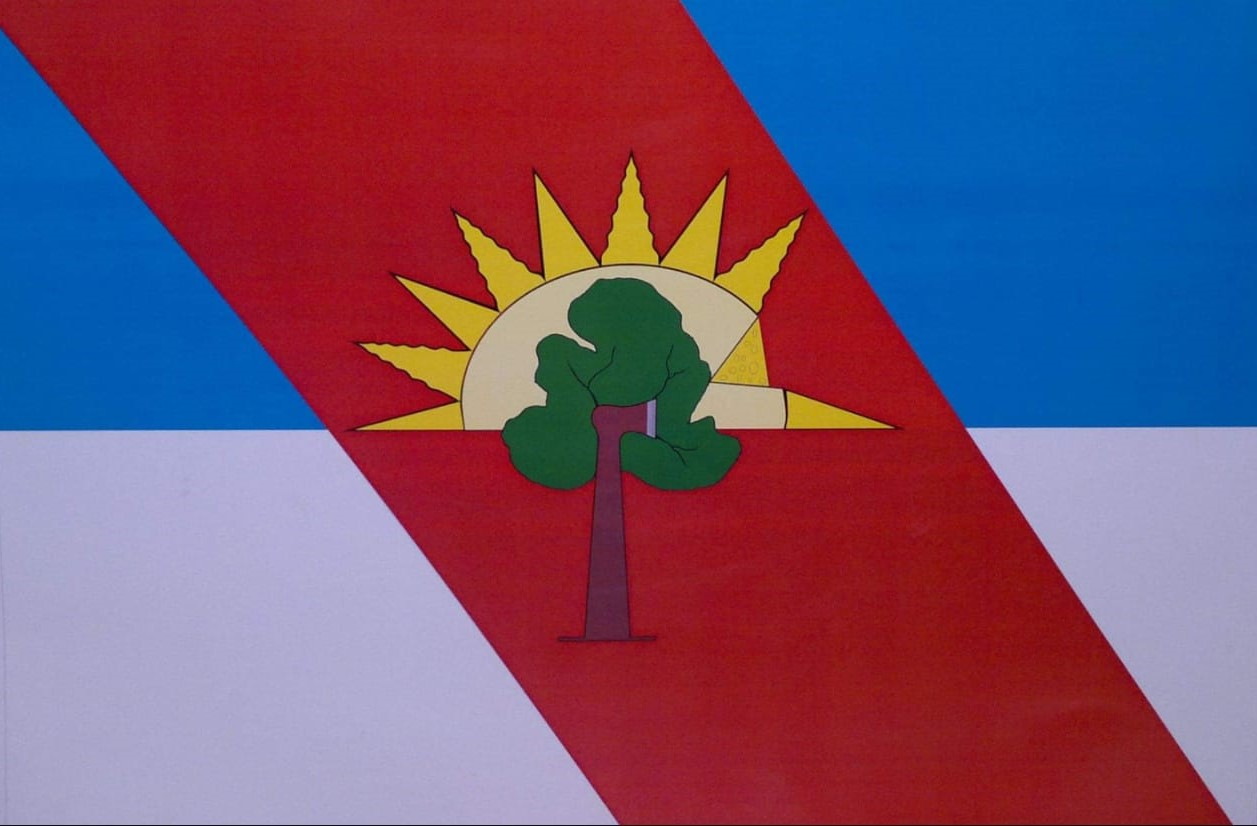
- Flag

- Country: Argentina
- Province: Santiago del Estero
- Department: Copo
- Established: 5 October 1931

Government
  - Mayor: Carlos Alberto Hazam PJ

Population (2010)
  - Total: 12,543
- Time zone: UTC−3 (ART)
- Postal code: 3714
- Area code: 03841
- Climate: BSh

Monte Quemado is a municipality and village in Santiago del Estero in Argentina. It is the capital city of the Copo Department, Province of Santiago del Estero, Argentina, in the Chaco Austral region, practically in the El Impenetrable phytogeographic zone.

It lies on national road RN 16, a route that runs parallel to a branch of the General Manuel Belgrano Railway and the aqueduct diverter from the Salado del Norte River known as the Canal de Dios. Precisely in Monte Quemado it starts as a branch of the aqueduct, the branch that goes to the south is called the Virgen del Carmen Canal, which runs parallel to provincial road RP 5 that connects Monte Quemado with Campo Gallo. Another land route which coincides with the RN 16 and RP 5 in Monte Quemado is provincial road RP 4.

== Toponymy ==
The first Quechua settlers, coming from the south of the province, named the vast region of scorching ashes and the semi-burnt remains of charred trunks that they encountered sacha rupaj – which in Southern Quechua means "burnt mountain" (monte quemado in Castilian Spanish). The Spanish-language version of the name became official by decree of José Félix Uriburu, de facto President of Argentina between 1930 and 1932, and was thereafter used by the Directorate General of Railways.

== History ==
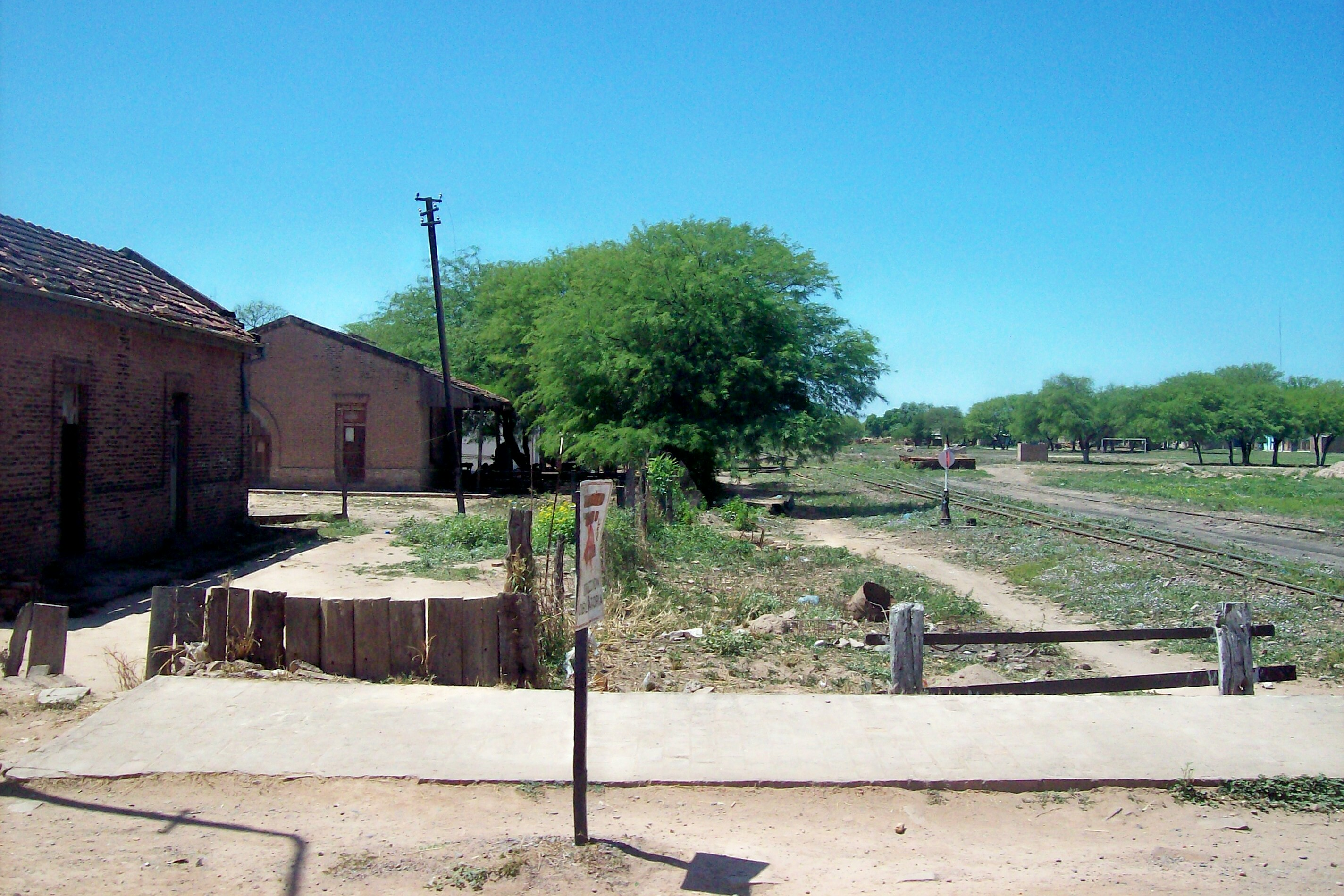
Train Station

The aboriginal tribes that inhabited the area before the arrival of the railroad were warlike hunters, isolated from other tribes due to the characteristics of El Impenetrable. They settled near the waterholes left by the Salado River floodwaters. The land supported native species such as rheas, guanacos, guasunchas, and wild boars, which are now seriously endangered.

The birth and evolution of Monte Quemado was influenced by the Salado river, the railroad and its subsequent forest harvesting. It consists of a band of ancient quebracho and carob trees and has an area of 13,785 km². It is crossed by the General Belgrano Railway and National Highway No. 16 which cross it east to west connecting the province of Chaco to Salta. Previously the Copo department had San José del Boqueron as capital, but with the arrival of the railroad, the town of Monte Quemado became the capital.

It was founded on October 5, 1932, but already had settlements scattered throughout the area for about a hundred years. These settlements began to be organized as a people, with the arrival of the railroad in the late 20th century until the official recognition from the Chamber of Deputies of the province by founding law No. 1176-1133.

In 1934 it had its first municipal commissioner, Mordecai Sayago. In 1938, on being named municipal commissioner, Lorenzo Acuña, took the first steps in shaping the official map of Monte Quemado. The first streets of the nascent village, the existing 25 de Mayo and 9 de Julio Avenues were then weeded, plotted and leveled. Hitherto these streets were trails that were open naturally as the people traveled.

The pioneers had to face the harsh climate and lack of water. The railroad transported the forest products produced and the supply of goods required for human consumption. In the early years water was conveyed to the town by rail. But shortly after 1940 this would become insufficient to supply the population so it had to start the first drilling. The construction of a canal going from Salado River began, bringing water to the towns of the Copo department. In 1977 the Canal de Dios was opened and since then has given life to Monte Quemado.

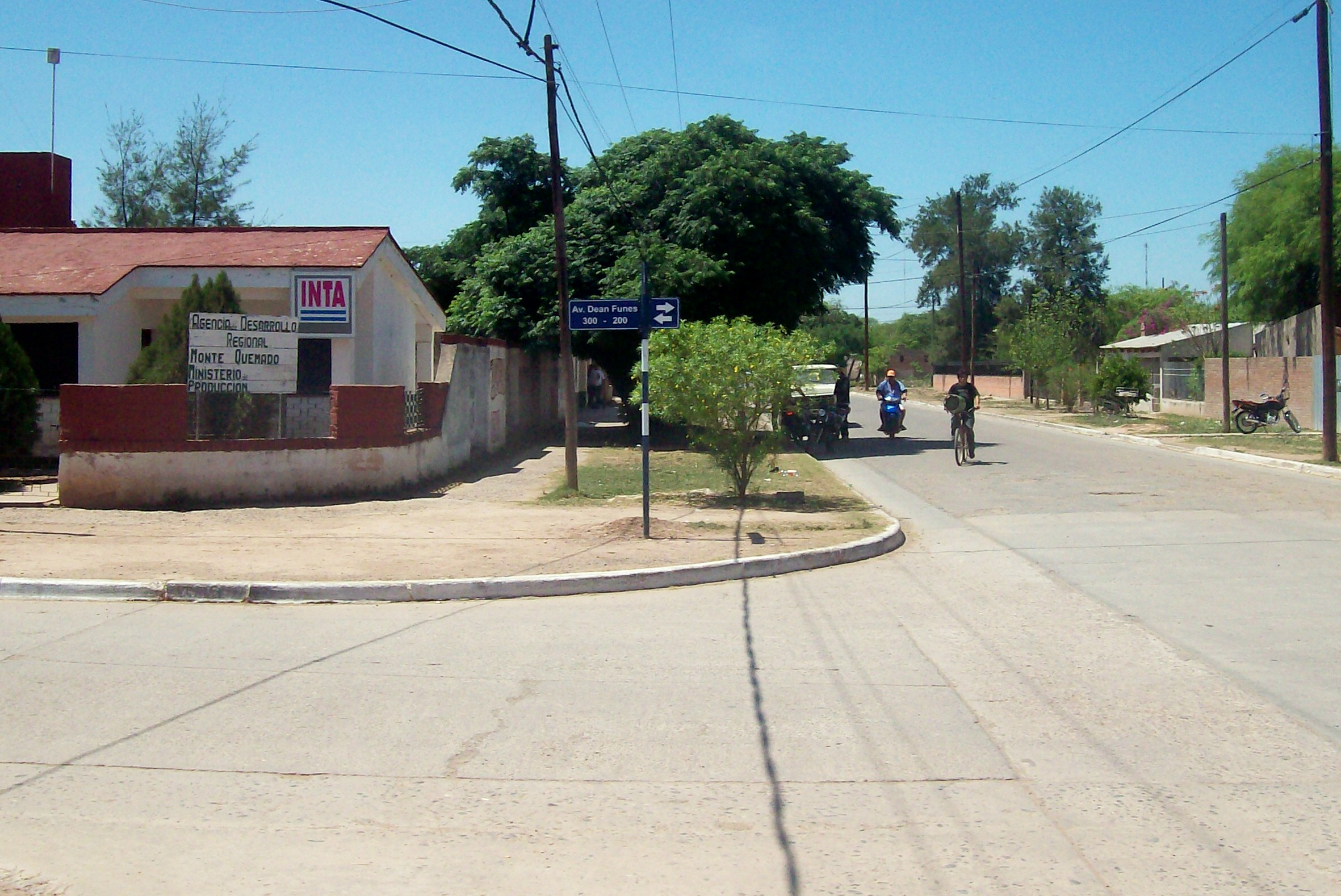
INTA (National Institute of Agricultural Technology)

== Economy ==
Logging was and remains the main economic activity of the people followed by livestock and of less importance agriculture. Quebracho products were historically used for the construction of railway lines and fences as well as for the extraction of tannin used in tanneries.
