= Sarmiento Department =

Sarmiento Department may refer to:

- Sarmiento Department, Chubut
- Sarmiento Department, San Juan
- Sarmiento Department, Santiago del Estero
