= Mailín =

Town in Santiago, Argentina

Coordinates: 28°29′S 63°16′W

Mailín is a small town 150 kilometres from Santiago del Estero, in the Santiago del Estero Province, Argentina, with a population of approximately 500.

The town is best known for the annual peregrination honouring the Señor de los Milagros de Mailín (Lord of Miracles). Every year, 40 days after Easter, pilgrims come from all over Argentina to worship the Lord of Miracles

It is said that late on the 18th century, a wooden cross was found in a field, with the image of Jesus' body painted on it. Unable to move the cross, the local people decided to erect a hermitage there. The pagan celebrations include the visit of the sanctuary, a mass, and several musical and artistic events that last around 3 days. There is another celebration, called Fiesta Chica (Small Celebration) that takes place in September.

In 1983, a sanctuary was constructed in the place to hold the cross, where 31 murals were painted by Julio Carreras. In 2003, a new altar was constructed.
