= Atamisqui Department =

- Department
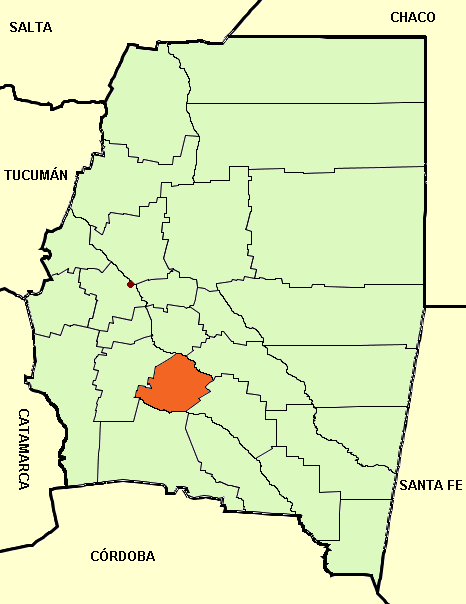
- Location of Atamisqui Department within Santiago del Estero Province
- Coordinates: 28°29′47″S 63°49′3″W
- Country: Argentina
- Province: Santiago del Estero
- Head town: Villa Atamisqui

Population (2001)
  - Total: 2,683
- Time zone: UTC-3 (ART)

Atamisqui Department (Spanish: Departamento Atamisqui) is a department of Argentina in Santiago del Estero Province. The capital city of the department is situated in Villa Atamisqui.
