= Pozo Hondo =

Coordinates: 27°10′S 64°29′W

- Municipality and village
- Interactive map of Pozo Hondo
- Country: Argentina
- Province: Santiago del Estero
- Department: Jiménez
- Time zone: UTC−3 (ART)
- Climate: BSh

Pozo Hondo is a municipality and village in Santiago del Estero Province in Argentina.
