= Jiménez Department =

- Department
- Location of Jiménez Department within Santiago del Estero Province
- Coordinates: 27°9′48″S 64°29′27″W
- Country: Argentina
- Province: Santiago del Estero
- Head town: Pozo Hondo

Area
  - Total: 4,832 km^{2} (1,866 sq mi)

Population (2010)
  - Total: 14,352
  - Density: 2.970/km^{2} (7.693/sq mi)
- Time zone: UTC-3 (ART)

Jiménez Department (Spanish: Departamento Jiménez) is a department of Argentina in Santiago del Estero Province. The capital city of the department is situated in Pozo Hondo. As of the 2010 census [INDEC], it counted with a population of 14,352 inhabitants.

To the east, it limits with Tucumán Province.

== Settlements ==
- Pozo Hondo (seat)
- El Bobadal
- San Félix
