= Silípica Department =

Coordinates: 28.0450°S 64.2239°W

- Department
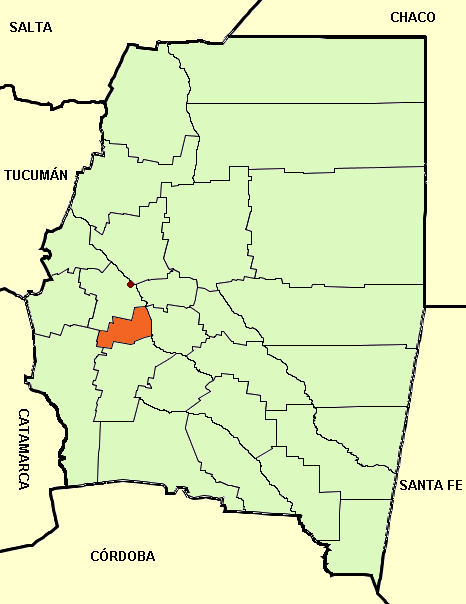
- Location of Silípica Department within Santiago del Estero Province
- Country: Argentina
- Province: Santiago del Estero
- Capital: Árraga
- Time zone: ART

Silípica Department is a department of Argentina in Santiago del Estero Province. The capital city of the department is Árraga.
