= Suncho Corral =

Suncho Corral (suncho city)
- Municipality and village
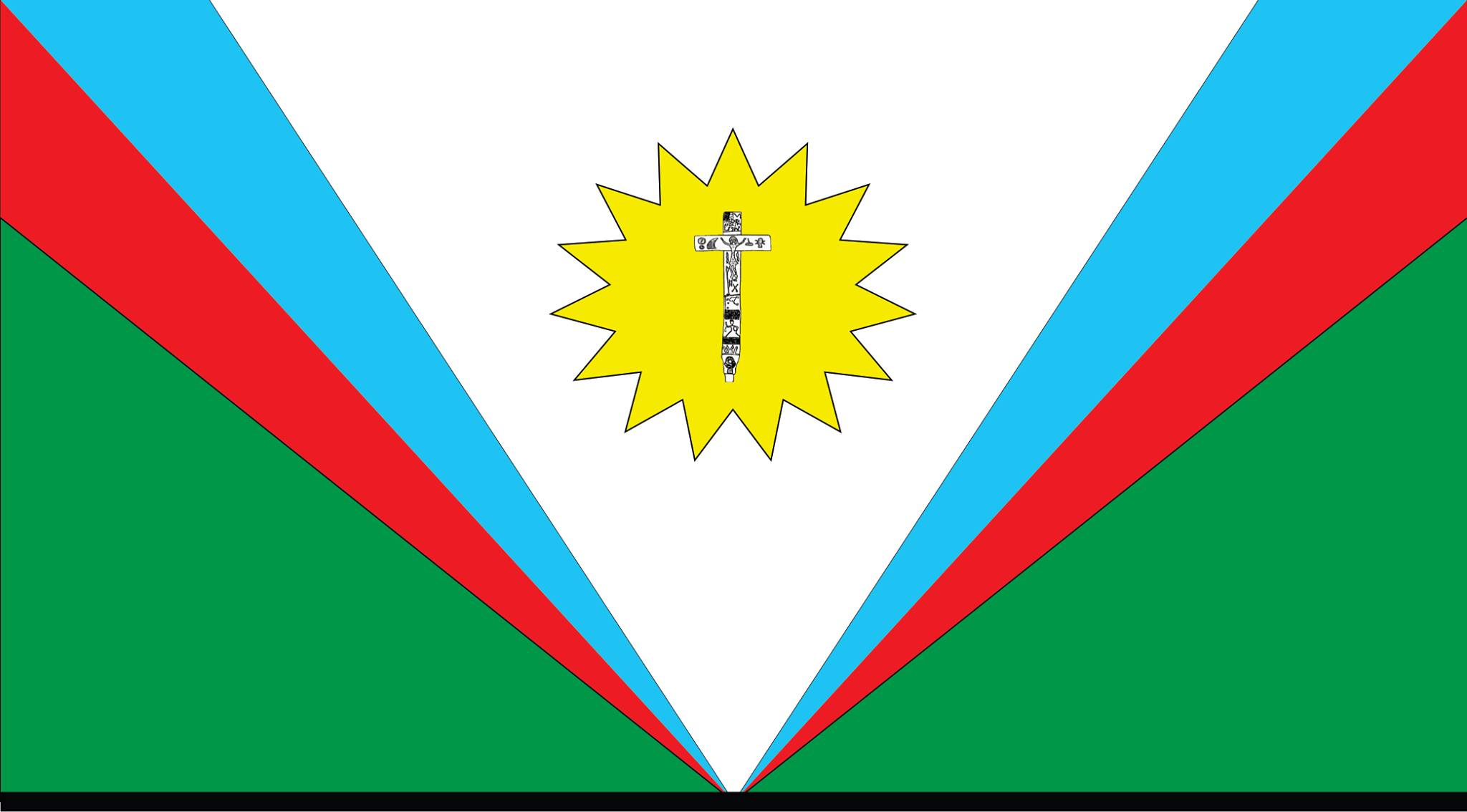
- Flag

- Location within Argentina
- Coordinates: 27°56′14″S 63°25′49″W
- Country: Argentina
- Province: Santiago del Estero
- Department: Juan Felipe Ibarra
- Elevation "Suncho Corral Elevation".: 443 ft (135 m)

Population (2010)"Suncho Corral Population".
  - Total: 7,201
- Time zone: UTC−3 (ART)
- Climate: BSh

Suncho Corral is a municipality and village in Santiago del Estero in Argentina. It is the capital of the Juan Felipe Ibarra Department.
