= Villa Unión, Santiago del Estero =

Villa Unión
- Municipality and village
- Location within Argentina
- Coordinates: 29°24′46″S 62°47′14″W
- Country: Argentina
- Province: Santiago del Estero
- Department: Mitre
- Time zone: UTC−3 (ART)
- Climate: Cfa

Villa Unión is a municipality and village in Santiago del Estero Province in Argentina.
