= Quebrachos Department =

Department of Argentina

Coordinates: 29°22′58″S 63°28′20″W

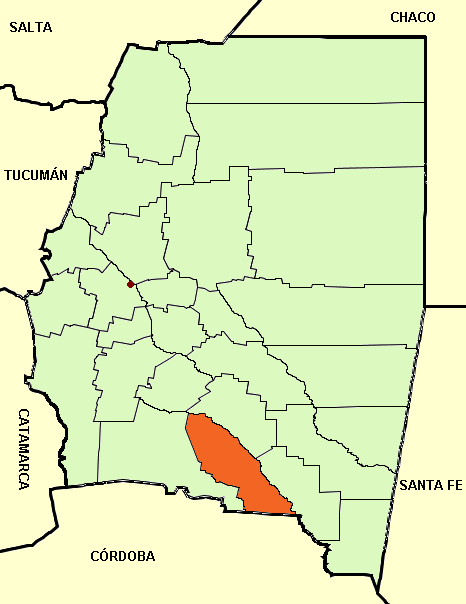
Quebrachos Department on map ofSantiago del Estero Province in Argentina

Quebrachos (Spanish : Departamento Quebrachos) is a department of Argentina in Santiago del Estero Province. The capital city of the department is situated in Sumampa.
