= Selva, Santiago del Estero =

Selva
- Municipality and village
- Location within Argentina
- Coordinates: 29°46′S 62°3′W
- Country: Argentina
- Province: Santiago del Estero
- Department: Rivadavia
- Time zone: UTC−3 (ART)
- Climate: Cfa

Selva is a municipality and village in Santiago del Estero Province in Argentina.
