= Gaspar Xuarez =

Argentine Jesuit, botanist, and naturalist

Gaspar Xuarez (Santiago del Estero, 1731 – Rome, 1804) was an Argentine Jesuit, botanist, and naturalist.
