= Termas de Río Hondo =

- City
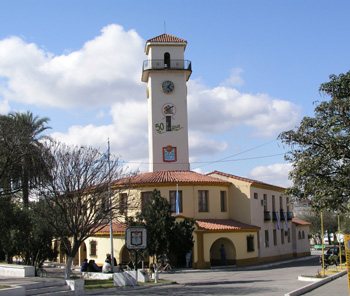
- Termas de Río Hondo town hall

- Location of Termas de Río Hondo in Argentina
- Coordinates: 27°29′S 64°52′W
- Country: Argentina
- Province: Santiago del Estero
- Department: Río Hondo
- Elevation: 265 m (869 ft)

Population (2010 census)
  - Total: 32,116
- Time zone: UTC−03:00 (ART)
- CPA base: G4220
- Dialing code: +54 3858
- Climate: Cwa

Termas de Río Hondo is a spa city in Santiago del Estero Province, Argentina. It has 27,838 inhabitants as per the 2001 census [INDEC]. It is located on the banks of the Dulce River, 65 km north of the provincial capital Santiago del Estero, near the artificial Río Hondo Lake.

The hot springs (Spanish: termas, Quechua: yacu rupaj) of the area have a temperature of over 30 °C (86 °F), and have made the town a popular spa resort for Argentines, who enjoy the waters recommended against high blood pressure and rheumatism. Two public pools, La Olla and the Pileta Municipal, are near the town centre, along with many well-regarded hotels and restaurants.

New investments done in the last years were the new Las Termas Airport and Autódromo Termas de Río Hondo, totally rebuilt to host MotoGP World Championship racing starting from April 2014.

The town was on the route of the 2015 and 2016 Dakar Rally.
