= Colonia El Simbolar =

Coordinates: 27°39′S 64°12′W

- Municipality and village
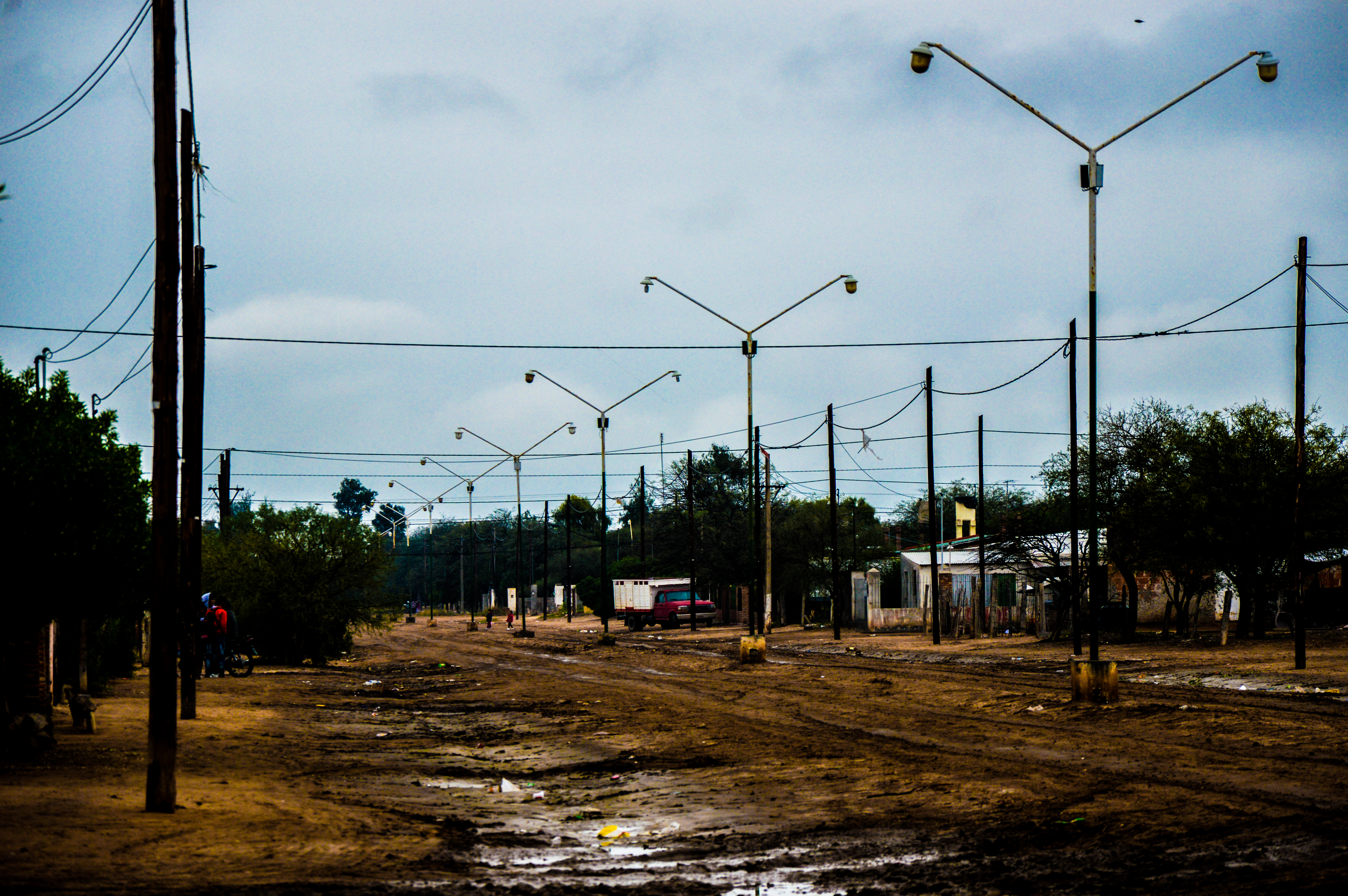
- Interactive map of Colonia El Simbolar
- Country: Argentina
- Province: Santiago del Estero Province
- Time zone: UTC−3 (ART)

Colonia El Simbolar is a municipality and village in Santiago del Estero Province in Argentina.
