= Moreno Department =

- Department
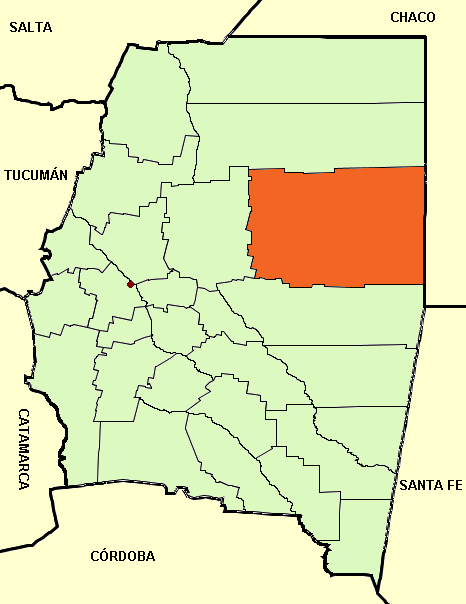
- Location of Moreno Department within Santiago del Estero Province
- Coordinates (Quimilí): 27°38′S 62°25′W
- Country: Argentina
- Province: Santiago del Estero
- Head town: Quimilí

Area
  - Total: 16,127 km^{2} (6,227 sq mi)

Population (2001)
  - Total: 28,053
  - Density: 1.7395/km^{2} (4.5053/sq mi)
- Time zone: UTC-3 (ART)

Moreno Department is a department of Santiago del Estero Province, Argentina. The capital lies at Quimilí.

The department covers an area of 16,127 km². The population as of 2001 was 28,053. The department contains the following municipalities:

- Las Tinajas
- Otumpa
- Patay
- Quimilí
- Tintina
- Weisburd
