= Nueva Esperanza, Santiago del Estero =

Nueva Esperanza
- Municipality and village
- Location of Nueva Esperanza in Argentina
- Coordinates: 26°12′S 64°14′W
- Country: Argentina
- Province: Santiago del Estero
- Department: Pellegrini
- Elevation: 1,056 ft (322 m)

Population (2010)
  - Total: 5,145
- Time zone: UTC−3 (ART)
- CPA base: G4197
- Dialing code: 03861
- Climate: Cwa

Nueva Esperanza is a municipality and village in Santiago del Estero Province in Argentina. It was initially established in the mid 1980s by Mennonites, though other immigrant communities of non-Mennonite origin also exist nowadays.
