= Brea Pozo =

Coordinates: 28°15′S 63°57′W

- Municipality and town
- Interactive map of Brea Pozo
- Country: Argentina
- Province: Santiago del Estero
- Department: San Martín
- Time zone: UTC−3 (ART)
- Climate: BSh

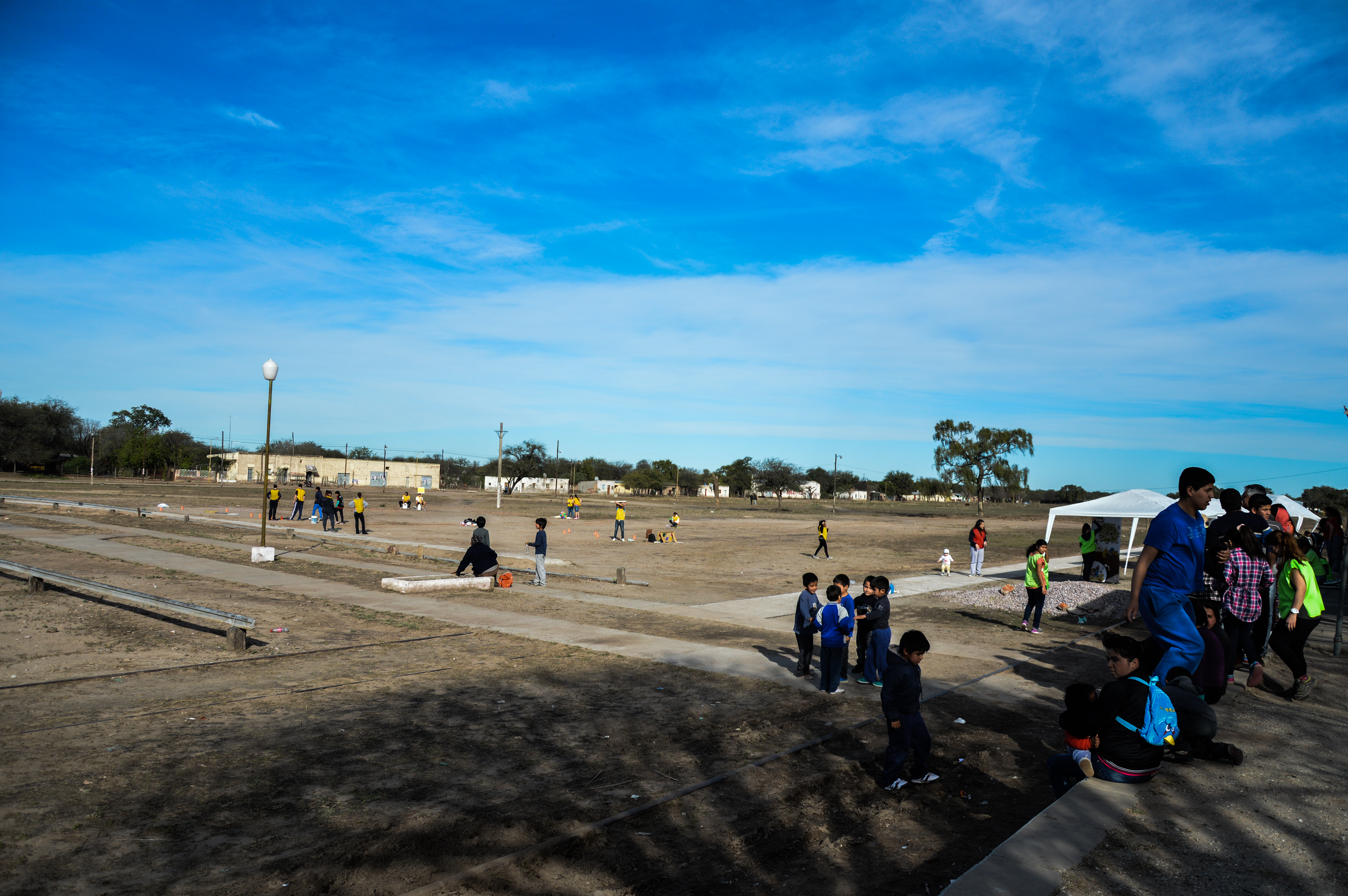
Brea Pozo

Brea Pozo is a municipality and small town in Santiago del Estero Province in Argentina.
