= Ojo de Agua Department =

Department of Argentina in Santiago del Estero Province

Coordinates: 29.4992°S 63.6950°W

- Department
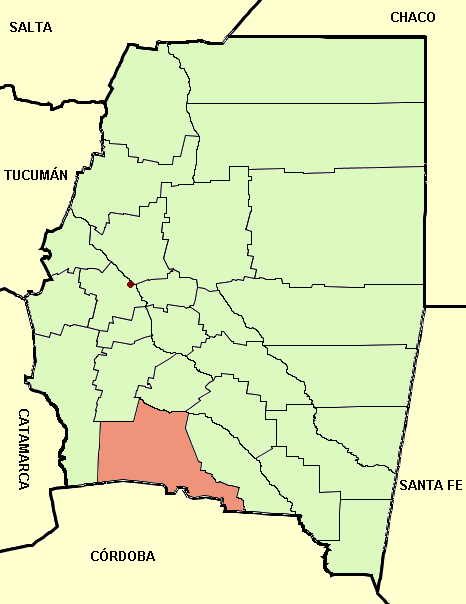
- Location of Ojo de Agua Department within Santiago del Estero Province
- Country: Argentina
- Province: Santiago del Estero
- Capital: Villa Ojo de Agua
- Time zone: ART

Ojo de Agua is a department of Argentina in Santiago del Estero Province. The capital city of the department is Villa Ojo de Agua.
