= Villa Río Hondo =

- Municipality and village
- Location in Santiago del Estero Province Location in Argentina Location in South America
- Coordinates: 27°34′S 64°57′W
- Country: Argentina
- Province: Santiago del Estero
- Time zone: UTC−3 (ART)

Villa Río Hondo is a municipality and village in Santiago del Estero in Argentina.
