= Avellaneda Department, Santiago del Estero =

Avellaneda Department
- Department
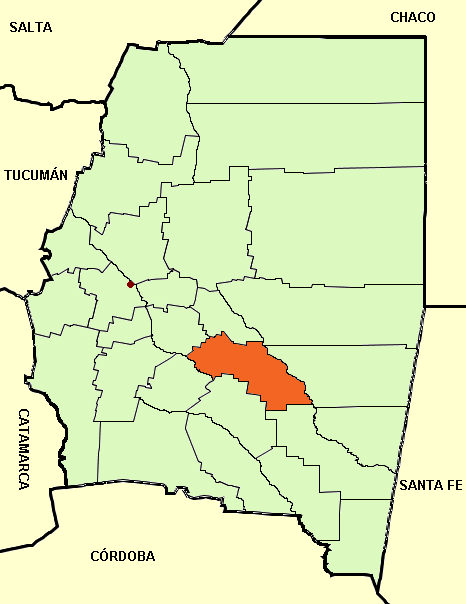
- Location of Avellaneda Department within Santiago del Estero Province
- Coordinates: 28°28′53″S 63°4′9″W
- Country: Argentina
- Province: Santiago del Estero
- Head town: Herrera

Area
  - Total: 3,902 km^{2} (1,507 sq mi)

Population (2010)
  - Total: 20,763
  - Density: 5.321/km^{2} (13.78/sq mi)
- Time zone: UTC-3 (ART)

Avellaneda Department (Spanish: Departamento Avellaneda) is a department of Argentina in Santiago del Estero Province. The capital city of the department is situated in Herrera.

== Districts ==
- Caloj
- Percas
- Punta Corral
- Cejas
- Gramilla
- Bracho
- Banda
- Mailín
- Mancapa
- Puyana
- Icaño
- Taco Atun
- San José

== Notable people ==
- Agustina Palacio de Libarona (1825-1880), writer, storyteller; also known as "La Heroína del Bracho"
