= María Antonia de Paz y Figueroa =

Argentine religious sister and Catholic saint (1730-1799)

Saint María Antonia de Paz y Figueroa
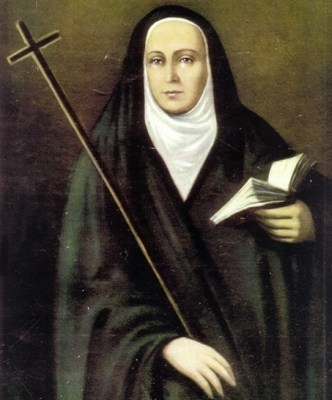

Virgin
- Born: 1730; Silípica, Santiago del Estero, Viceroyalty of Peru
- Died: 7 March 1799 (aged 69); Buenos Aires, Viceroyalty of the Rio de la Plata
- Venerated in: Roman Catholic Church
- Beatified: 27 August 2016, Santiago del Estero, Argentina by Cardinal Angelo Amato
- Canonized: 11 February 2024, Saint Peter's Basilica, Vatican City by Pope Francis
- Feast: 7 March
- Patronage: Daughters of the Divine Savior; Female entrepreneurs Argentine missions

María Antonia de Paz y Figueroa (religious name María Antonia of Saint Joseph; 1730 – 7 March 1799), later known as Mama Antula in Santiagueño Quechua, was a Catholic religious sister who established the Daughters of the Divine Savior (Spanish: Hijas del Divino Salvador). She was beatified on 27 August 2016. On 11 February 2024, she was canonised by Pope Francis. She is Argentina's first female saint.

== Life ==
María Antonia de Paz y Figueroa was born in 1730 in the Viceroyalty of the Rio de la Plata of the Spanish Empire, today Argentina; she was descended from an illustrious family of rulers and conquerors. Her childhood was spent at home, where she led a devout life and decided at the age of fifteen that she wanted to devote herself entirely to God. At that time there was no active cloistered religious life, so she decided to wear a black robe and live with other women in a small community.

Guided by the Jesuit priest Gaspar Juarez, she devoted her time to assisting parents in the instruction of their children and also catered to the sick and to the poor. She also spent time doing needlework. In 1767, Charles III of Spain expelled the Jesuits, prompting her to restore the Spiritual Exercises of Saint Ignatius. This was an initiative that was not well received as there was a hostile environment to the Jesuits, yet she continued to organize this restoration. She began inviting people to retreats from 1768 until 1770, and she did this across the viceroyalty, to places such as Salavina and Atamasqui. After the success of the retreats in those places, she travelled to Buenos Aires in September 1779, where she met with imperial officials, who refused her the task of restoration.

In 1780 the retreats in Buenos Aires began with great success, and the Archbishop of Buenos Aires Sebastián Malvar y Pinto supported her. Her work became well-known not only in the viceroyalty, but in France, such as in the convent of Saint-Denis in Paris, where the prioress was the aunt of King Louis XVI. Letters she wrote during this period were translated into languages including English and German, and were sent for inspiration to various countries. She also established the Daughters of the Divine Savior.

On 7 March 1799 she died at the age of 69, and was buried in Buenos Aires.

== Beatification ==
The beatification process opened in Buenos Aires in a diocesan process under Archbishop Mariano Antonio Espinosa on behalf of Pope Pius X on 23 October 1905 and it concluded its business on 29 September 1906. Her spiritual writings were approved by theologians on 9 August 1916. The formal introduction of the cause came under Pope Benedict XV on 8 August 1917 and it conferred upon her the title Servant of God.

The declaration of the nihil obstat ("nothing against") to the cause was granted on 26 January 1999, and a second diocesan process opened on 3 May 1999 and concluded on 18 July 1999, allowing the formal decree of ratification to be granted on 3 December 1999.

The positio was submitted to the Congregation for the Causes of Saints in Rome in 2005 for further evaluation. However, the cause was relegated to the historical commission as the case was of long standing, and concerned a person about whom there was little documentation. Consultants met to approve the continuation of the cause on 17 January 2006.

Pope Benedict XVI recognized that she had lived a life of heroic virtue, and on 1 July 2010 proclaimed her to be venerable.

A miracle in 1904 that was attributed to her intercession, required for beatification, was investigated in Argentina and the process was formally ratified on 15 February 2002. The medical board in Rome met on 25 November 2010 to discuss the healing of the nun Rosa Vanina, but the results were inconclusive; the board met again on 25 June 2015 and approved the healing to be a miracle. Theologians met to discuss the cause on 10 November 2015 and gave it their approval. The case was taken to the members of the Congregation on 9 February 2016, who passed it to Pope Francis for his approval. The pope approved the healing as a miracle on 3 March 2016, which allowed the beatification to take place.

The postulator of the cause suggested before the beatification that she would be beatified in 2016 as Pope Francis strongly supported the cause's conclusion. After it was confirmed that the cause would receive papal approval an article on 10 February 2016 indicated that the actual beatification Mass would be celebrated either in September or October 2016. The beatification took place in Santiago del Estero on 27 August 2016. Cardinal Angelo Amato presided over the celebration on behalf of the pope.

== Canonization ==
In a mass celebrated at St. Peter's Basilica on 11 February 2024, Pope Francis canonized María Antonia de Paz y Figueroa. She is Argentina's first female saint.
