= Choya Department =

- Department
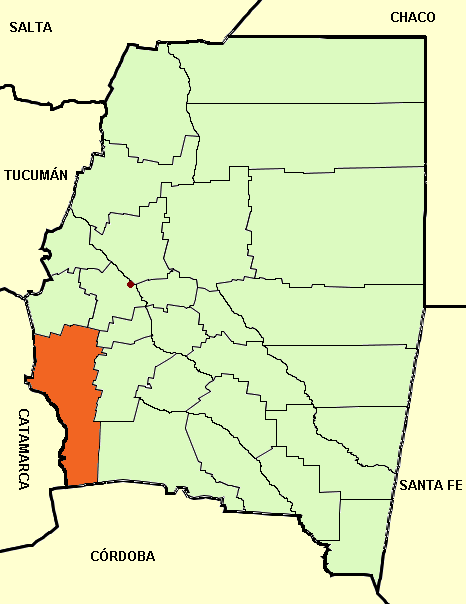
- Location of Choya Department within Santiago del Estero Province
- Coordinates: 28°38′10″S 65°7′1″W
- Country: Argentina
- Province: Santiago del Estero
- Head town: Frías

Area
  - Total: 6,492 km^{2} (2,507 sq mi)

Population (2010)
  - Total: 34,667
  - Density: 5.340/km^{2} (13.83/sq mi)
- Time zone: UTC-3 (ART)

Choya Department (Spanish: Departamento Choya) is a department of Argentina in Santiago del Estero Province. The capital city of the department is situated in Frías.
