= Mitre Department =

Department of Argentina in Santiago del Estero Province

Coordinates: 29.4139°S 62.7897°W

- Department
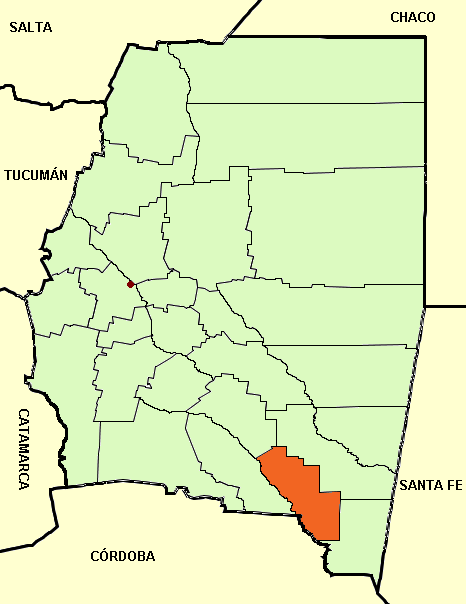
- Location of Mitre Department within Santiago del Estero Province
- Country: Argentina
- Province: Santiago del Estero
- Capital: Villa Unión
- Time zone: ART

Mitre Department is a department of Argentina in Santiago del Estero Province. The capital city of the department is Villa Unión.
