= Villa Ojo de Agua =

- Municipality and village
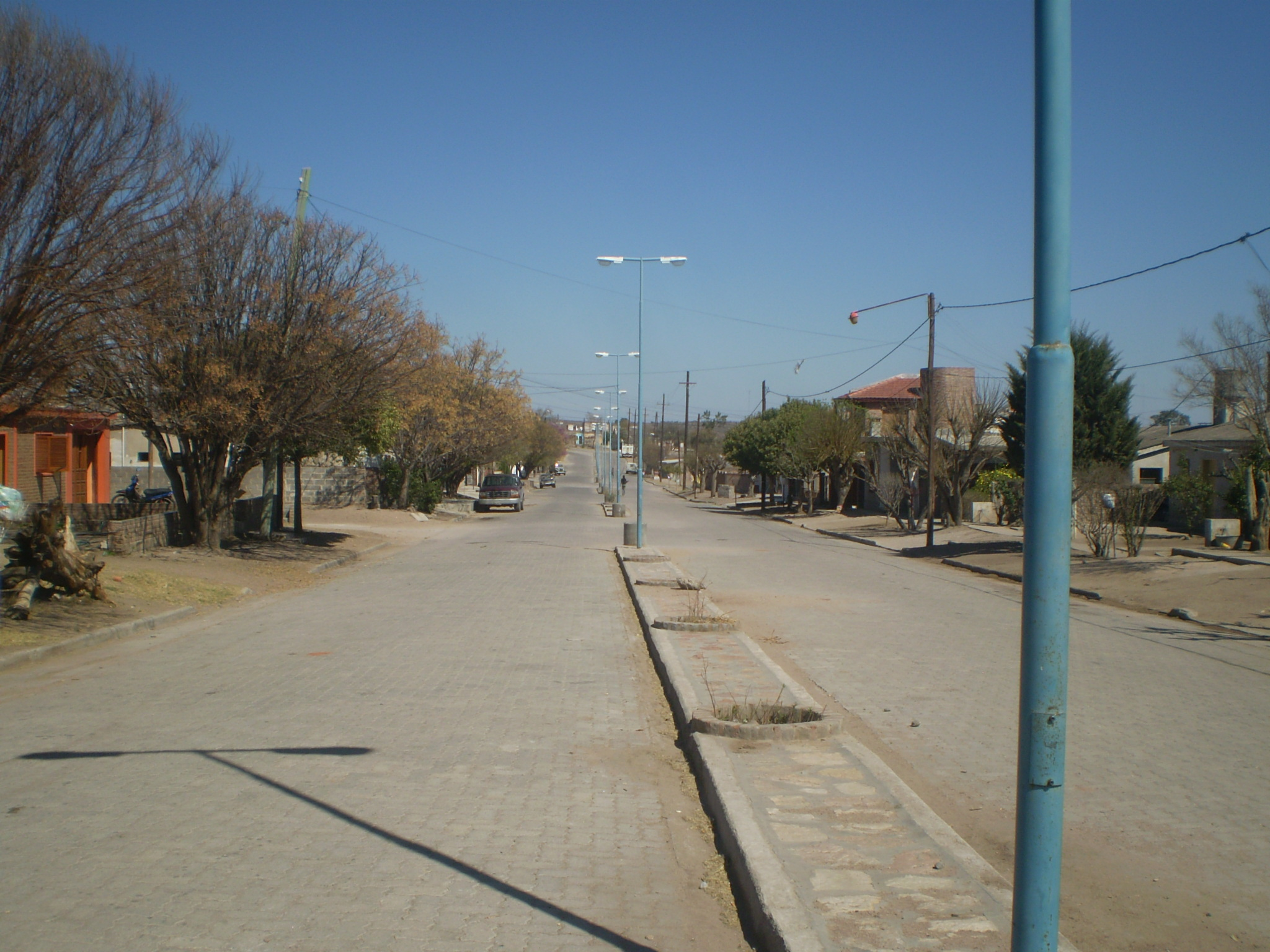

- Coordinates: 29°30′07″S 63°41′33″W
- Country: Argentina
- Province: Santiago del Estero Province
- Department: Ojo de Agua Department

Government
  - Mayor: Mónica Bustamante
- Elevation: 1,654 ft (504 m)

Population (2022)
  - Total: 15 000
- Time zone: UTC−3 (ART)
- ZIP Code: G5250
- Area code: 03856
- Climate: Cwa
- Website: www.ojodeagua.digital

Villa Ojo de Agua is a municipality and village in Santiago del Estero Province in Argentina.

It is located south of Santiago del Estero, and north of Cordoba, being crossed by National Route No. 9.
