= Río Hondo Department =

- Department
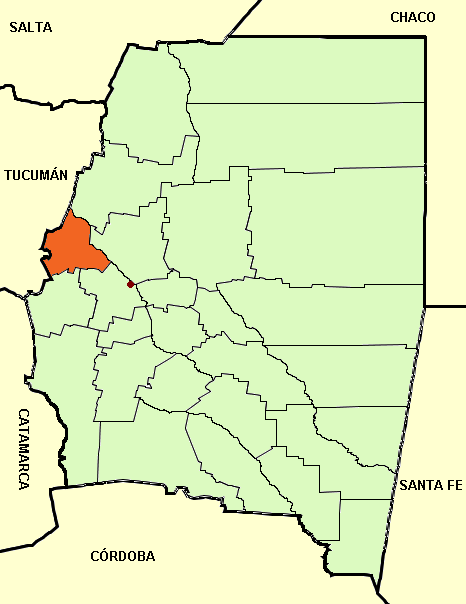
- Location of Río Hondo Department within Santiago del Estero Province
- Coordinates: 27°29′51″S 64°51′47″W
- Country: Argentina
- Province: Santiago del Estero
- Head town: Termas de Río Hondo

Area
  - Total: 2,124 km^{2} (820 sq mi)

Population (2010)
  - Total: 54,867
  - Density: 25.83/km^{2} (66.90/sq mi)
- Time zone: UTC-3 (ART)

Río Hondo Department (Spanish: Departamento Río Hondo) is a department of Argentina in Santiago del Estero Province. The capital city of the department is situated in Termas de Río Hondo.
