= Frías, Santiago del Estero =

Frías
- City
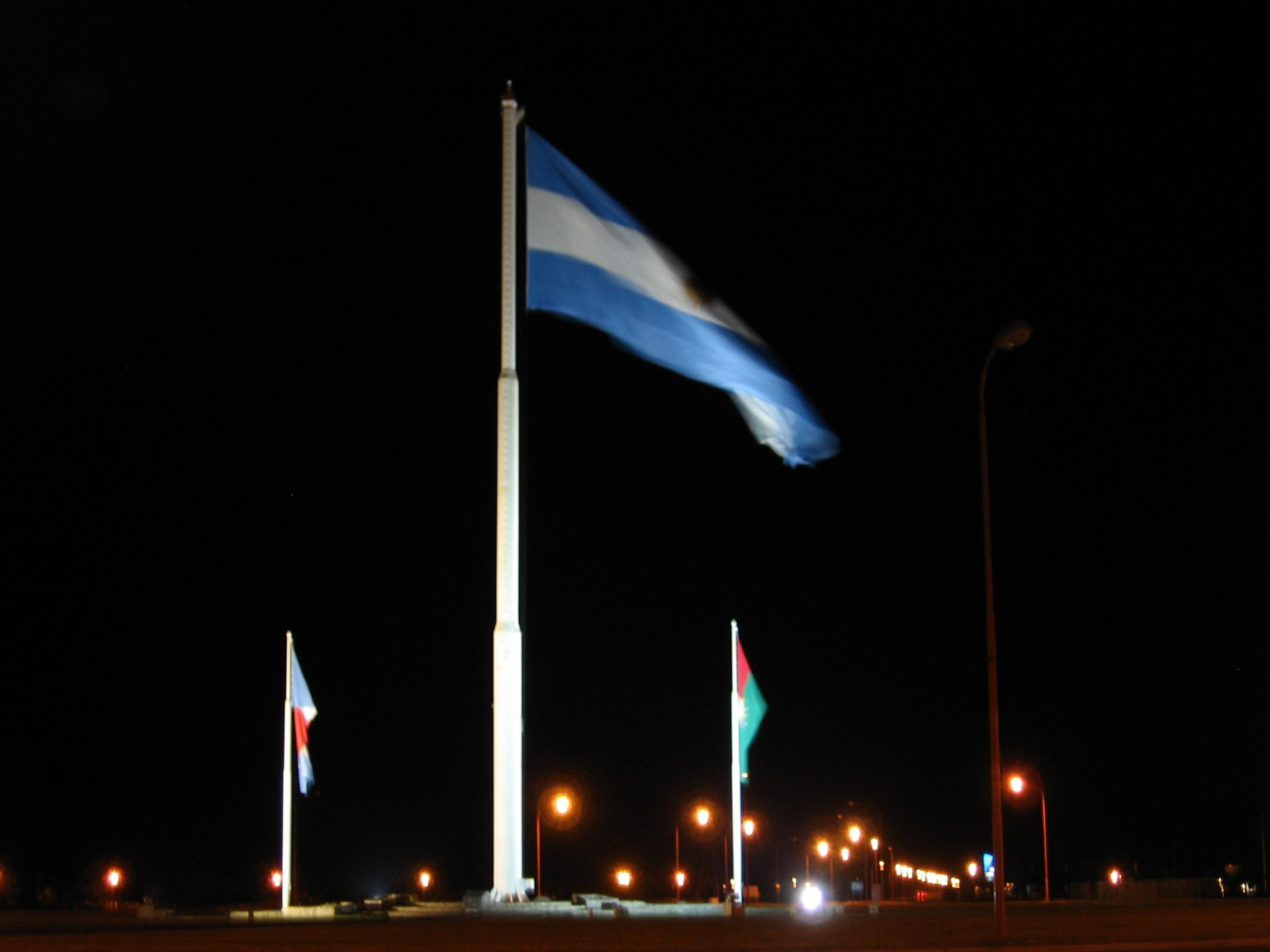

- Location within Argentina
- Coordinates: 28°38′00″S 65°08′00″W
- Country: Argentina
- Province: Santiago del Estero
- Department: Choya
- Founded: September 24, 1874
- Elevation: 335 m (1,099 ft)

Population (2010 census)
  - Total: 26,649
- Time zone: UTC−3 (ART)
- ZIP: G4320
- Area code: 03854
- Climate: BSh
- Website: Official website

Frías is a city in Argentina, located southwest of the province of Santiago del Estero, near the border with the province of Catamarca, and is the head of the Choya Department. It is located on the banks of the river Albigasta at coordinates: 28 ° 38'60 "S 65 ° 09'05" W.

The city was founded on September 24, 1874.

== Population ==
It has 269 inhabitants (INDEC, 2010), representing a significant increase in 22,048 inhabitants (INDEC, 1999) the previous census. This magnitude is positioned as the third Agglomeration in the province. Before being planned as a city with the name Frías, it was known by the name of Villa Únzaga, when it was a railway stop. Frías, now known as "the city of friendship," because of its warmth towards its visitors, is experiencing population growth closely linked to the start-up firms in the new industrial area a few kilometers from the city that will generate many jobs and improve the lifestyle of the city.

== Trivia ==
It hosts one of the four Syriac Orthodox parishes from Argentina, given the large influx of migrants from the Levant (and specially from Zaidal, Fairouzeh and Sadad) that arrived to the city until the 1960s.

It is the first place where a marriage between persons of the same sex occurred in Argentina, July 29 of 2010.
