= Los Telares =

Coordinates: 28°59′S 63°26′W

- Municipality and village
- Interactive map of Los Telares
- Country: Argentina
- Province: Santiago del Estero
- Department: Salavina
- Time zone: UTC−3 (ART)
- Climate: BSh

Los Telares is a municipality and village in Santiago del Estero Province in Argentina.
