= Bandera, Santiago del Estero =

Coordinates: 28°54′S 62°16′W

Bandera (Santiago del Estero)
- Municipality and town
- Country: Argentina
- Province: Santiago del Estero
- Department: Belgrano

Government
  - Mayor: Oscar Gorosito, UCR

Population (2001)
  - Total: 5,335
- Time zone: UTC−3 (ART)
- Postal code: 3064
- Area code: 03857
- Climate: Cfa

Bandera (Santiago del Estero) is a municipality and town in Santiago del Estero Province in Argentina. It is the capital of the Belgrano Department, at the edge of National Route 98. Bandera is located some 272 km from the provincial capital, which is reached by National Route No. 34 and Provincial Route No. 21. The town has 5,335 inhabitants, according to the 2001 census, 67% of the total population of the department.

== Festivals and expositions ==
- Bandera Expo - the most important agriculture, trade exhibition in Southeast Santiago del Estero, usually in the month of June, on the grounds of the Rural Society of Southeast Santiago del Estero.
- The Santiago del Estero Provincial Bull Festival is held annually alongside the Bandera Expo.

== Parish churches ==
- San Francisco Solano Parish Church
- Our Lady of Guadalupe Parish Church
- San Cayetano Parish Church

== Ecclesiastical history of Bandera ==
In 1911 Bandera was transformed into a prominent community . The then faithful Catholics of that time called for the establishment of a parish, precisely in the same year that the independent parish, and subsequently diocese, of Añatuya was formed. Intervention in ecclesiastical matters came from the Belgrano and Taboada departments, by way of then Archbishop Juan Yaniz y Paz, Bishop of the Diocese of Santiago del Estero. He appointed authority of the new section to Priest Paul F. Blasco, who went to Bandera and from the communal authority requested the formation of a pro-church commission and provincial school, involving: ulio Hamman, Jose Pedrazzini, Juan Bautista Omacini, Facundo de Martiola, Julian Gongora, Constantino Coppola, Augusto Savi, Natalio De La Llama, Vicente Pintaudi, Toribio Coronel and Inés Paz. These met in an official meeting on September 12, 1912, and made the first act in which it was unanimously decided that San Isidro Labrador would be named as the patron saint of the community of San Francisco Solano.
