= Icaño, Santiago del Estero =

Coordinates: 28°41′S 62°54′W

Icaño (Santiago del Estero)
- Municipality and village
- Interactive map of Icaño (Santiago del Estero)
- Country: Argentina
- Province: Santiago del Estero
- Time zone: UTC−3 (ART)

Icaño (Santiago del Estero) is a municipality and village in Santiago del Estero Province in Argentina.
