= Juan Felipe Ibarra Department =

- Department
- Location of Juan Felipe Ibarra Department within Santiago del Estero Province
- Coordinates: 25°48′22″S 62°49′53″W
- Country: Argentina
- Province: Santiago del Estero
- Head town: Suncho Corral

Area
  - Total: 9,139 km^{2} (3,529 sq mi)

Population (2010)
  - Total: 18,051
  - Density: 1.975/km^{2} (5.116/sq mi)
- Time zone: UTC-3 (ART)

Juan Felipe Ibarra Department (Spanish: Departamento Juan Felipe Ibarra) is a department of Argentina in Santiago del Estero Province. The capital city of the department is situated in Suncho Corral.
