= Weisburd =

Coordinates: 27°18′S 62°36′W

- Municipality and village
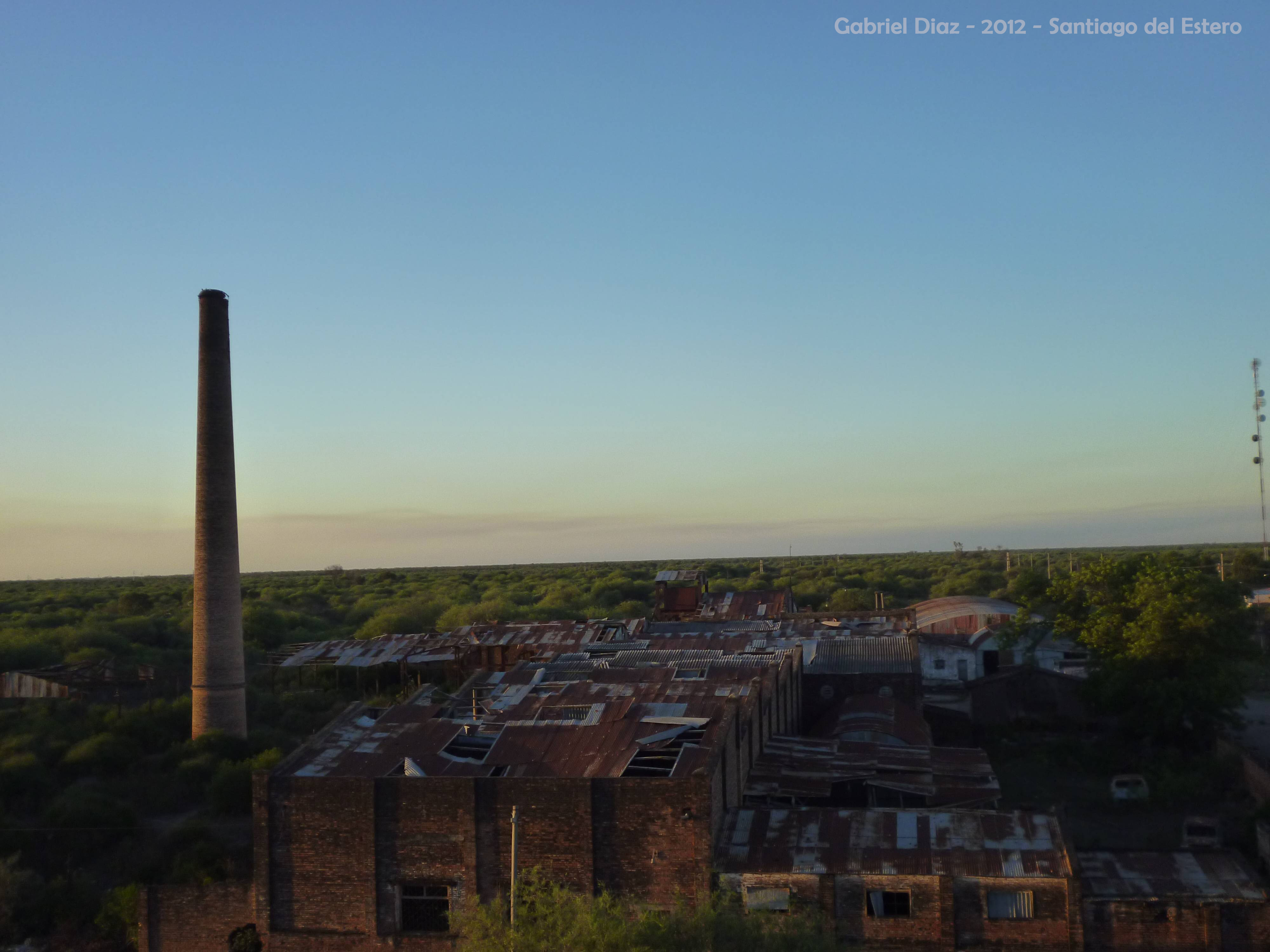
- Interactive map of Weisburd
- Country: Argentina
- Province: Santiago del Estero Province

Weisburd is a municipality and village in Santiago del Estero Province in Argentina.
