= Árraga =

Coordinates: 28°04′S 64°14′W

- Municipality and village
- Interactive map of Árraga
- Country: Argentina
- Province: Santiago del Estero Province
- Department: Silípica Department

Government
  - Mayor: Juan R. Cardenas

Population (2001)
  - Total: 903
- Time zone: UTC−3 (ART)
- Postcode: G4206
- Area code: 0385

Árraga is a municipality and village in Santiago del Estero in Argentina. It is the head district of the Silípica Department to the southwest of the province of Santiago del Estero. It is located 32 km from the provincial capital city of Santiago del Estero (capital), south along National Route 9.

== Population ==
Arraga's population, according to the 2001 census, was 903 inhabitants, representing 41% of the Department.
