= Sumampa =

Coordinates: 29°22′58″S 63°28′11″W

- Municipality and village
- Interactive map of Sumampa
- Country: Argentina
- Province: Santiago del Estero
- Department: Quebrachos
- Time zone: UTC−3 (ART)
- Climate: Cwa

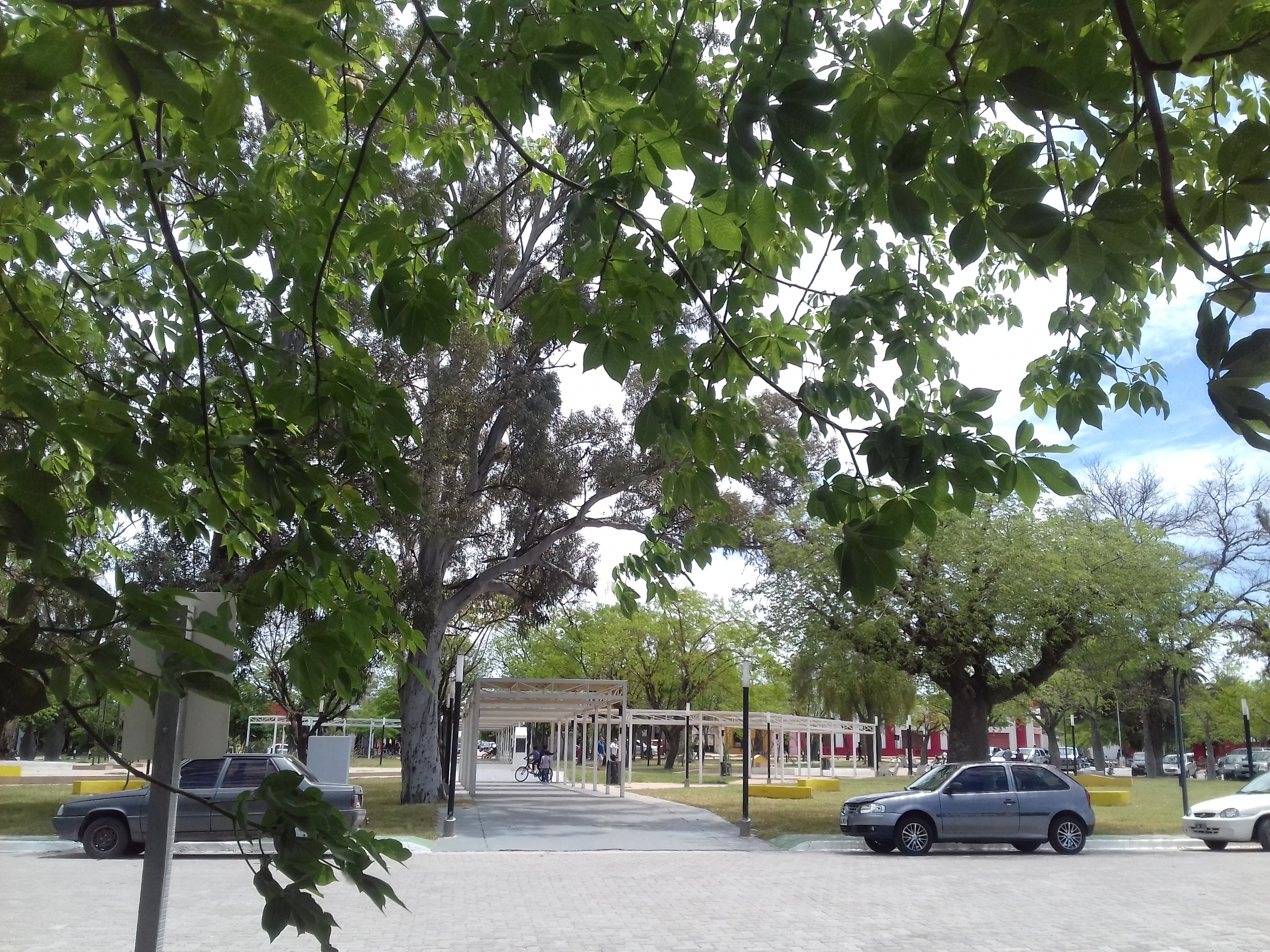
Sumampa

Sumampa is a municipality and village in Santiago del Estero Province in Argentina.
