= La Cañada, Argentina =

Coordinates: 27°42′32″S 63°46′25″W

La Cañada (Santiago del Estero)
- Municipality and village
- Interactive map of La Cañada (Santiago del Estero)
- Country: Argentina
- Province: Santiago del Estero
- Department: Figueroa
- Time zone: UTC−3 (ART)
- Climate: BSh

La Cañada (Santiago del Estero) is a municipality and village in Santiago del Estero Province in Argentina.
