= Quimilí =

- Town
- Location of Quimilí in Argentina
- Coordinates: 27°38′S 62°25′W
- Country: Argentina
- Province: Santiago del Estero Province
- Department: Moreno Department

Population (2001)
  - Total: 10,959
- Time zone: UTC−3 (ART)
- Climate: BSh

Quimilí is a town in Santiago del Estero Province, Argentina. The capital city of the Moreno Department, it lies about 200 km east of the provincial capital city, Santiago del Estero, and 70 km west of the border with Chaco Province, to which it is connected by National Route 89.

The INDEC census of 2001 recorded a total population of 10,959 inhabitants for Quimilí.
