= Garza, Santiago del Estero =

Municipality and village in Argentina

Garza
- Municipality and village
- Location within Argentina
- Coordinates: 28°9′S 63°32′W
- Country: Argentina
- Province: Santiago del Estero
- Department: Sarmiento
- Time zone: UTC−3 (ART)
- Climate: BSh

Garza is a municipality and village in Santiago del Estero Province in Argentina.
