= Herrera, Santiago del Estero =

Coordinates: 28°24′S 62°23′W

Herrera (Santiago del Estero)
- Municipality and village
- Interactive map of Herrera (Santiago del Estero)
- Country: Argentina
- Province: Santiago del Estero
- Department: Avellaneda
- Time zone: UTC−3 (ART)
- Climate: BSh

Herrera (Santiago del Estero) is a municipality and village in Santiago del Estero Province in Argentina.
