= Campo Gallo =

Coordinates: 26°35′S 62°51′W

- Municipality and village
- Interactive map of Campo Gallo
- Country: Argentina
- Province: Santiago del Estero Province
- Department: Alberdi Department
- Time zone: UTC−3 (ART)
- Climate: BSh

Campo Gallo is a municipality and village in Santiago del Estero in Argentina.

== Santiago del Estero Earthquake (2023) ==
On January 20, 2023, a magnitude 6.8 earthquake struck the Santiago del Estero Province, with the epicenter being about 15 miles (24 kilometers) away from Campo Gallo.

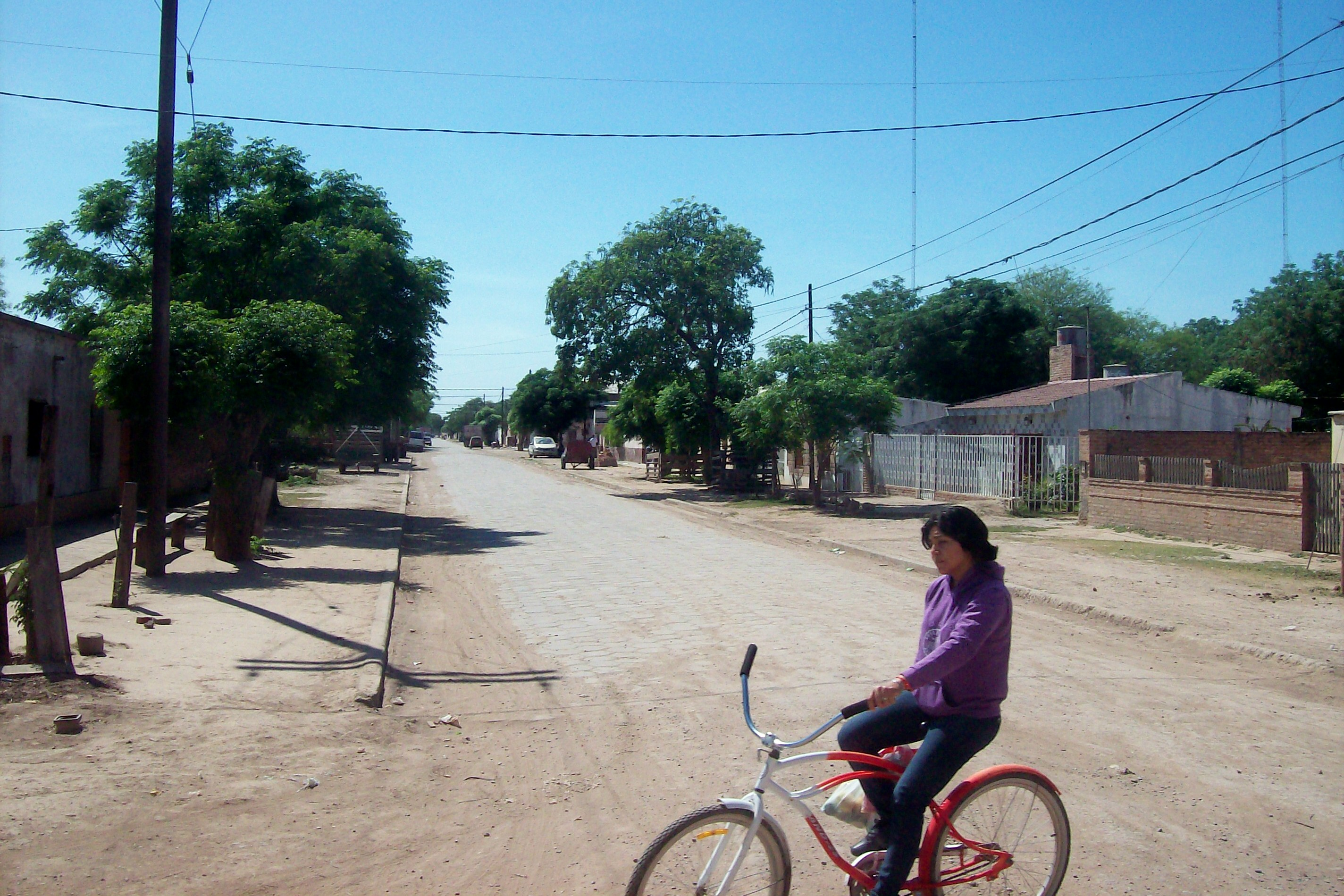
Campo Gallo

Campo Gallo was the closest inhabited city to the epicenter of the earthquake. However, according to local authorities, there were no reports of damages or deaths in the aftermath of the Earthquake.

== See also ==
- Santiago del Estero Province
- List of earthquakes in 2023
- Santiago del Estero
- Natural disasters in Argentina
