= El Bobadal =

Coordinates: 26°43′S 64°24′W

- Municipality and village
- Interactive map of El Bobadal
- Country: Argentina
- Province: Santiago del Estero
- Time zone: UTC−3 (ART)

El Bobadal is a municipality and village in Santiago del Estero in Argentina.
