= Rivadavia Department, Santiago del Estero =

Rivadavia Department
- Department
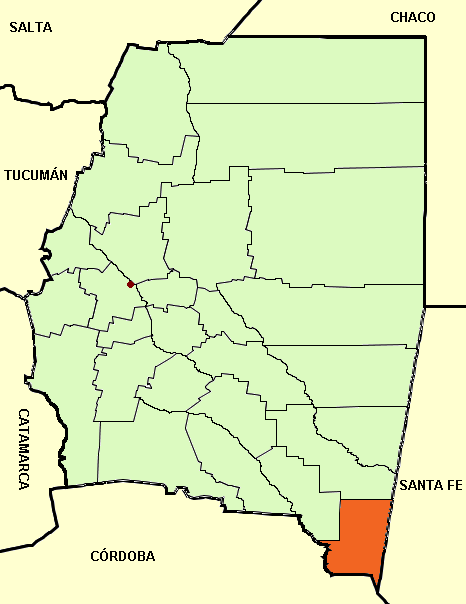
- Location of Rivadavia Department within Santiago del Estero Province
- Coordinates: 29°46′S 62°2′W
- Country: Argentina
- Province: Santiago del Estero
- Head town: Selva

Area
  - Total: 3,402 km^{2} (1,314 sq mi)

Population (2010)
  - Total: 5,015
  - Density: 1.474/km^{2} (3.818/sq mi)
- Time zone: UTC-3 (ART)

Rivadavia Department (Spanish: Departamento Rivadavia) is a department of Argentina in Santiago del Estero Province. The capital city of the department is situated in Selva.
