= Salavina Department =

Department of Argentina in Santiago del Estero Province

Coordinates: 28.9850°S 63.4506°W

- Department
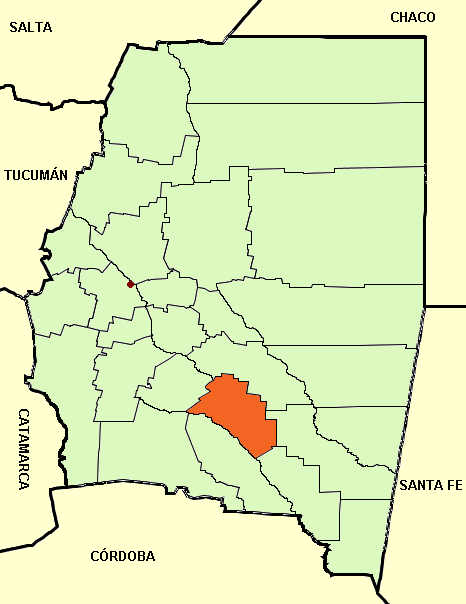
- Location of Salavina Department within Santiago del Estero Province
- Country: Argentina
- Province: Santiago del Estero
- Capital: Los Telares
- Time zone: ART

Salavina Department is a department of Argentina in Santiago del Estero Province. The capital city of the department is Los Telares.
