= Belgrano Department, Santiago del Estero =

Belgrano Department
- Department
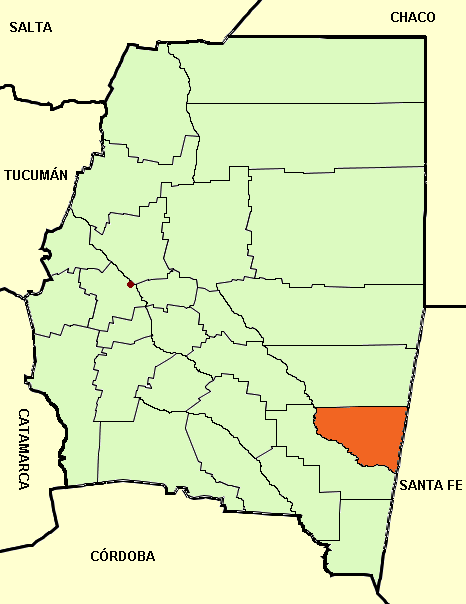
- Location of Belgrano Department within Santiago del Estero Province
- Coordinates: 28°54′S 62°16′W
- Country: Argentina
- Province: Santiago del Estero
- Head town: Bandera

Area
  - Total: 3,314 km^{2} (1,280 sq mi)

Population (2010)
  - Total: 9,243
  - Density: 2.789/km^{2} (7.224/sq mi)
- Time zone: UTC-3 (ART)

Belgrano Department (Spanish: Departamento Belgrano) is a department of Argentina in Santiago del Estero Province. The capital city is Bandera.
