= San Martín Department, Santiago del Estero =

San Martin Departamento San Martín
- Department
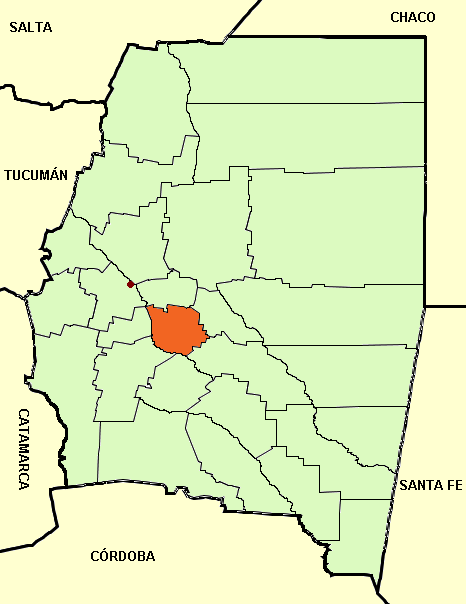
- location of Departamento San Martín in Santiago del Estero Province
- Coordinates: 28°15′S 63°57′W
- Country: Argentina
- Seat: Brea Pozo

Area
  - Total: 2,097 km^{2} (810 sq mi)

Population (2001 census [INDEC])
  - Total: 9,854
  - Density: 4.699/km^{2} (12.17/sq mi)

San Martín is a department of Santiago del Estero Province (Argentina), and one of the twenty-seven administrative units of the province.
