= Sarmiento Department, Santiago del Estero =

Sarmiento Department
- Department
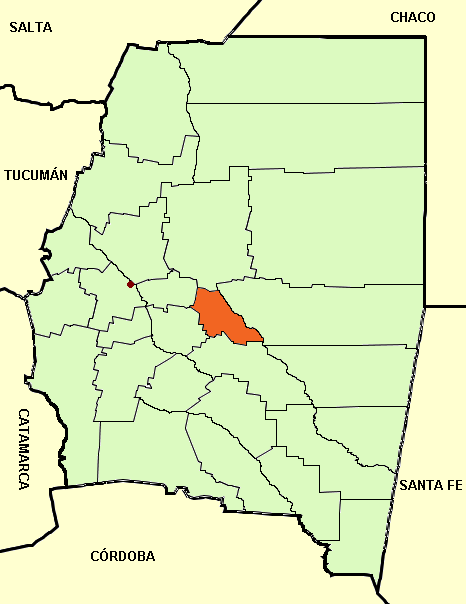
- Location of Sarmiento Department within Santiago del Estero Province
- Coordinates: 28°9′0″S 63°32′0″W
- Country: Argentina
- Province: Santiago del Estero
- Head town: Garza

Area
  - Total: 1,549 km^{2} (598 sq mi)

Population (2010)
  - Total: 4,607
  - Density: 2.974/km^{2} (7.703/sq mi)
- Time zone: UTC-3 (ART)

Sarmiento Department (Spanish: Departamento Sarmiento) is a department of Argentina in Santiago del Estero Province. The capital city of the department is situated in Garza.
