= San Pedro de Guasayán =

- Municipality and town
- Location within Argentina
- Coordinates: 27°57′S 65°9′W
- Country: Argentina
- Province: Catamarca and Santiago del Estero
- Department: Santa Rosa and Guasayán
- Time zone: UTC−3 (ART)
- Climate: BSh

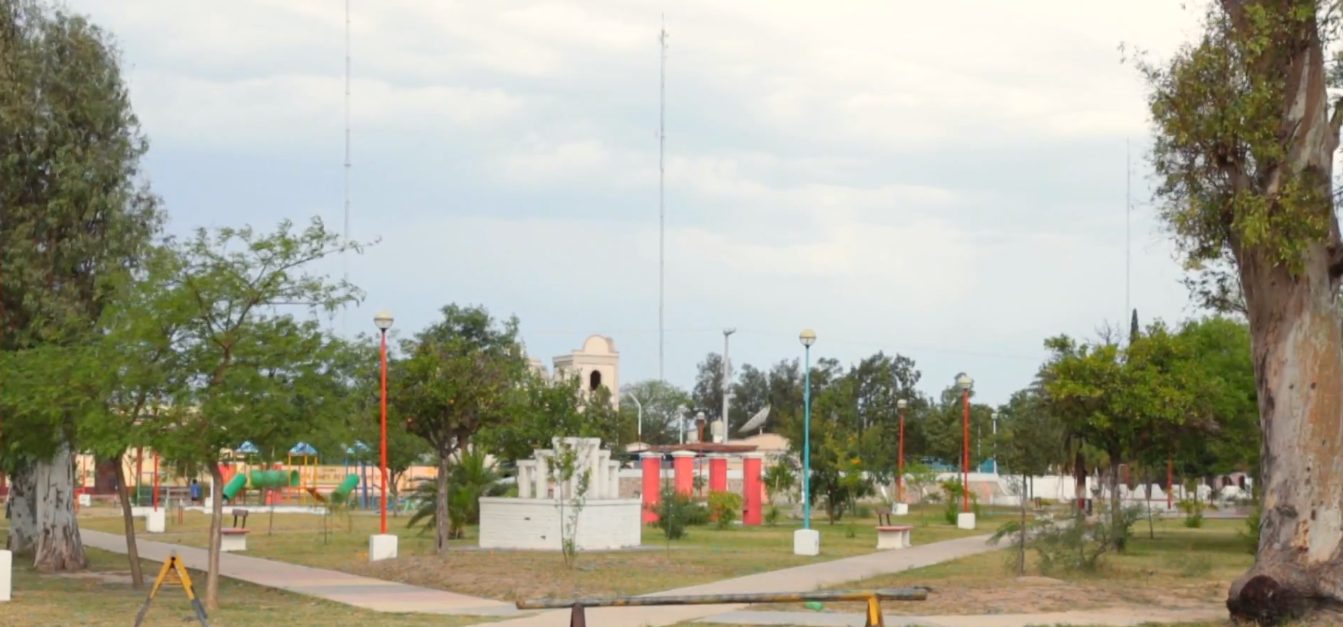
San Pedro de Guasayán square

San Pedro de Guasayán is a municipality and small town located between Catamarca and Santiago del Estero in Argentina.
