= Pellegrini Department =

Department of Argentina in Santiago del Estero Province

Coordinates: 26.2000°S 64.2411°W

- Department
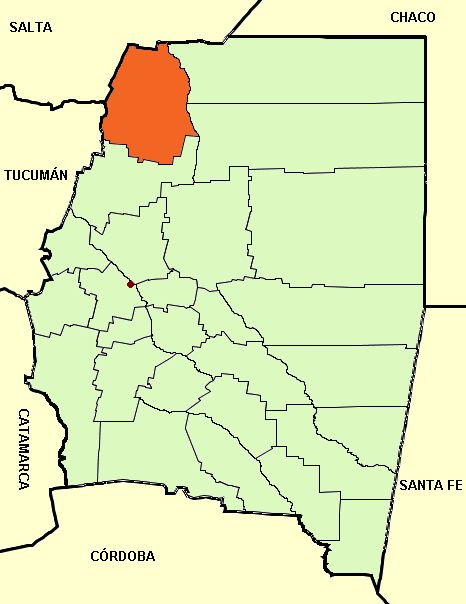
- Location of Pellegrini Department within Santiago del Estero Province
- Country: Argentina
- Province: Santiago del Estero
- Capital: Nueva Esperanza
- Time zone: ART

Pellegrini Department is a department of Argentina in Santiago del Estero Province. The capital city of the department is in Nueva Esperanza.

== Location ==
Pellegrini is located in the far northwest corner of Santiago del Estero. It borders Salta Province and Tucumán Province.
