= Guasayán Department =

- Department
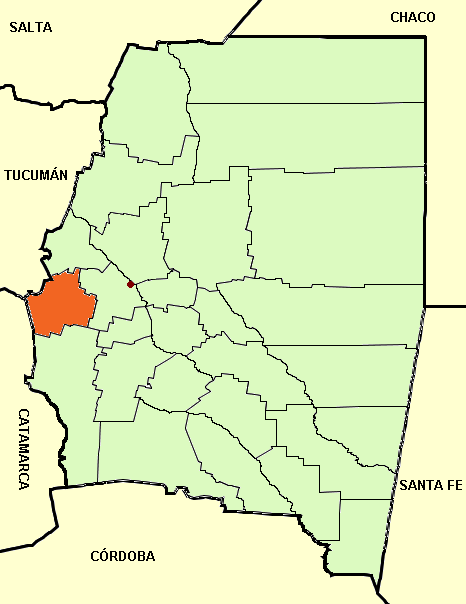
- Location of Guasayán Department within Santiago del Estero Province
- Coordinates (San Pedro): 27°57′S 65°10′W
- Country: Argentina
- Province: Santiago del Estero
- Head town: San Pedro de Guasayán

Area
  - Total: 2,588 km^{2} (999 sq mi)

Population
  - Total: 7,404
  - Density: 2.861/km^{2} (7.410/sq mi)
- Time zone: UTC-3 (ART)

Guasayán Department is a departamento of the province of Santiago del Estero, Argentina.

This region of small mountains in the west of the province is 2,588 km² (less than 2% of the province) and has 7,404 inhabitants (2001 census [INDEC]) (less than 1% of the province's population). Its capital is San Pedro de Guasayán, with 1,715 inhabitants, located 124 kilometres from Santiago del Estero, the provincial capital, on Provincial Route 64. Other villages include Lavalle, Guampaya and Villa Guasayán.

The highest peak in the department is Sinchi Caña at 630 metres, and no river issues from it. According to some historians, the term Guasayán could mean "path behind the sierra", or "view from the heights". There are some ruins from Native American inhabitants, especially near Villa Guasayán. Diego de Rojas is said to have travelled through those lands around 1544.
