= Villa Atamisqui =

- Municipality and village
- Location within Argentina
- Coordinates: 28°29′47″S 63°49′4″W
- Country: Argentina
- Province: Santiago del Estero Province
- Department: Atamisqui
- Time zone: UTC−3 (ART)
- Climate: BSh

Villa Atamisqui is a municipality and village in Santiago del Estero in Argentina. It is the capital of the Atamisqui Department.
