= San José Villa =

Coordinates: 26°46′24″S 66°03′37″W

- Municipality and town
- Interactive map of San José Villa
- Country: Argentina
- Province: Catamarca Province
- Time zone: UTC−3 (ART)

San José Villa is a town and municipality in Catamarca Province in northwestern Argentina. To the north it continues into the La Loma neighbourhood.
