= Copo Department =

- Department
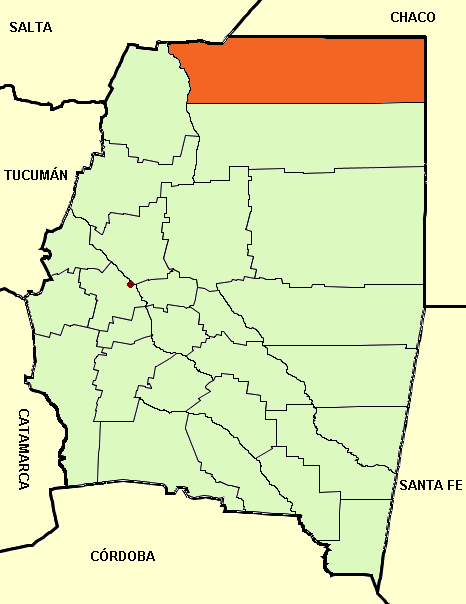
- Location of Copo Department within Santiago del Estero Province
- Coordinates: 25°48′22″S 62°49′53″W
- Country: Argentina
- Province: Santiago del Estero
- Head town: Monte Quemado

Area
  - Total: 12,604 km^{2} (4,866 sq mi)

Population (2022)
  - Total: 35,741
  - Density: 2.8357/km^{2} (7.3444/sq mi)
- Time zone: UTC-3 (ART)

Copo Department (Spanish: Departamento Copo) is a department of Argentina in Santiago del Estero Province. The capital city of the department is situated in Monte Quemado.
