= Figueroa Department =

Department of Argentina in Santiago del Estero Province

Coordinates: 27.7089°S 63.7742°W

- Department
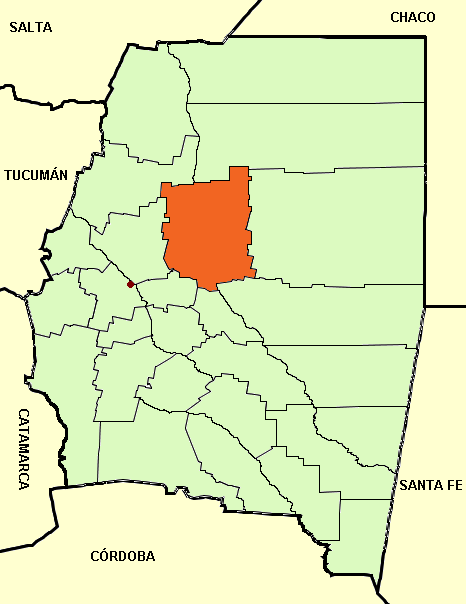
- Location of Figueroa Department within Santiago del Estero Province
- Country: Argentina
- Province: Santiago del Estero
- Capital: La Cañada
- Time zone: ART

Figueroa Department is a department of Argentina in Santiago del Estero Province. The capital city of the department is La Cañada.

== Settlements ==
- Callejón Bajada
- Caspi Corral
- La Cañada
- La Invernada
- La Loma
