= Tío Pozo =

Coordinates: 28°24′S 63°59′W

- Municipality and village
- Interactive map of Tío Pozo
- Country: Argentina
- Province: Santiago del Estero
- Time zone: UTC−3 (ART)

Tío Pozo is a municipality and village in Santiago del Estero in Argentina.
