= Santiago del Estero Province =

Province of Argentina

Coordinates: 27°47′S 64°16′W

Santiago del Estero
- Province
- Province of Santiago del Estero; Provincia de Santiago del Estero (Spanish); Santiago del Estero Wamani (Quichua)
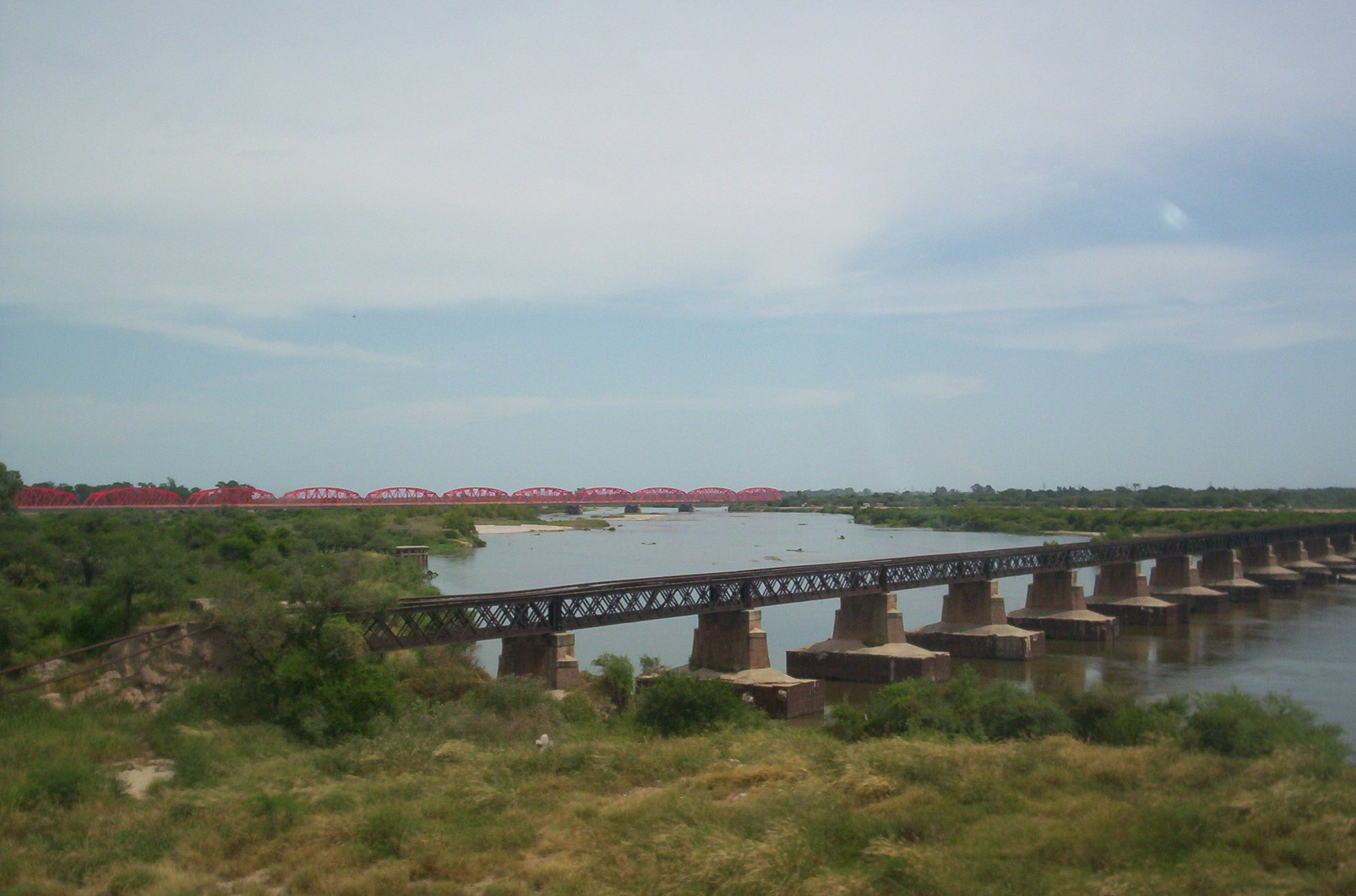
- View of the Dulce River

- Flag Coat of arms

- Location of Santiago del Estero within Argentina
- Country: Argentina
- Capital: Santiago del Estero
- Departments: 27
- Municipalities: 28

Government
  - Governor: Elías Suárez (FCpS)
  - Vice Governor: Carlos Silva Neder (FCpS)
  - Legislature: 40
  - National Deputies: 7
  - National Senators: Gerardo Zamora (FCpS); Elia Moreno (FCpS); José Emilio Neder (PJ)

Area Ranked 9th
  - Total: 136,351 km^{2} (52,645 sq mi)

Population (2022 census)
  - Total: 1,054,028
  - Rank: 12th
  - Density: 7.73026/km^{2} (20.0213/sq mi)
- Demonym: santiagueño

GDP
  - Total: US$ 11.2 billion
  - Per capita: US$ 11,300
- Time zone: UTC−3 (ART)
- ISO 3166 code: AR-G
- Languages: Spanish (official); Quechua (co-official)
- HDI (2021): 0.833 very high (21st)
- Website: www.sde.gov.ar

Santiago del Estero (Spanish pronunciation: [sanˈtjaɣo ðel esˈteɾo]), also known simply as Santiago, is a province in the north of Argentina. Neighboring provinces, clockwise from the north, are Salta, Chaco, Santa Fe, Córdoba, Catamarca and Tucumán.

== History ==
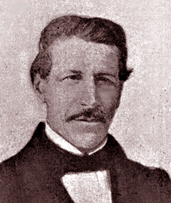
Composer and lawmaker Amancio Jacinto Alcorta

The indigenous inhabitants of these lands were the Juríes-Tonocotés, Sanavirones and other tribes. Santiago del Estero is home to about 100,000 speakers of the local variety of Quechua, making this the southernmost outpost of the language of the Incas. When the language reached the area, and how, remains unclear—it may even have arrived only with the native troops that accompanied the first Spanish expeditions.

Diego de Rojas first reached this land in 1542. Francisco de Aguirre founded the city of Santiago del Estero in 1553 as the northernmost city founded by Spanish conquistadores coming from the Pacific Ocean.

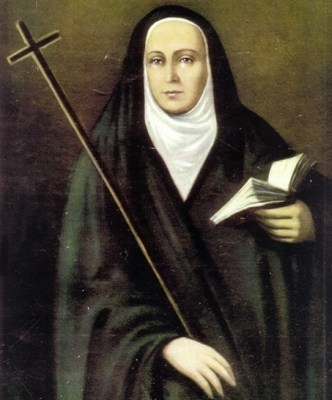
Saint María Antonia de San José was an Argentine religious sister

Santiago then passed under different governments, from the intendency of Tucumán to the Audiencia de Charcas, then again to Tucumán, of which it was later to be designated capital.

However, the bishop moved to Córdoba in 1699 and the government moved to Salta two years later. Furthermore, the silver route between Buenos Aires and the Viceroyalty of Peru passed through Tucumán rather than through Santiago. The combination of these circumstances drastically reduced the importance of the city and the territory and, by the beginning of the 19th century, the city had barely 5,000 inhabitants.

With the creation of the intendency of Salta, Santiago del Estero was transferred to the new intendency of Tucumán. In the middle of the national conflict, Santiago del Estero separated from Tucumán in 1820, coming under the control of pro-autonomy Governor Juan Felipe Ibarra. Among the new province's most effective advocates during its early decades was Amancio Jacinto Alcorta, a young composer of sacral music who, representing his province from 1826 to 1862, helped modernize commerce and its taxation in the unstable young nation and promoted domestic banking and credit. In 1856 the provincial constitution was formulated.

At the beginning of the 20th century Santiago del Estero acquired part of the lands that were the subject of a dispute with Chaco Province. By then the province had four cities and 35,000 inhabitants, most of whom lived in precarious conditions. The construction of the Los Quiroga dam in 1950 enabled the productivity of the otherwise arid land to be increased by irrigation.

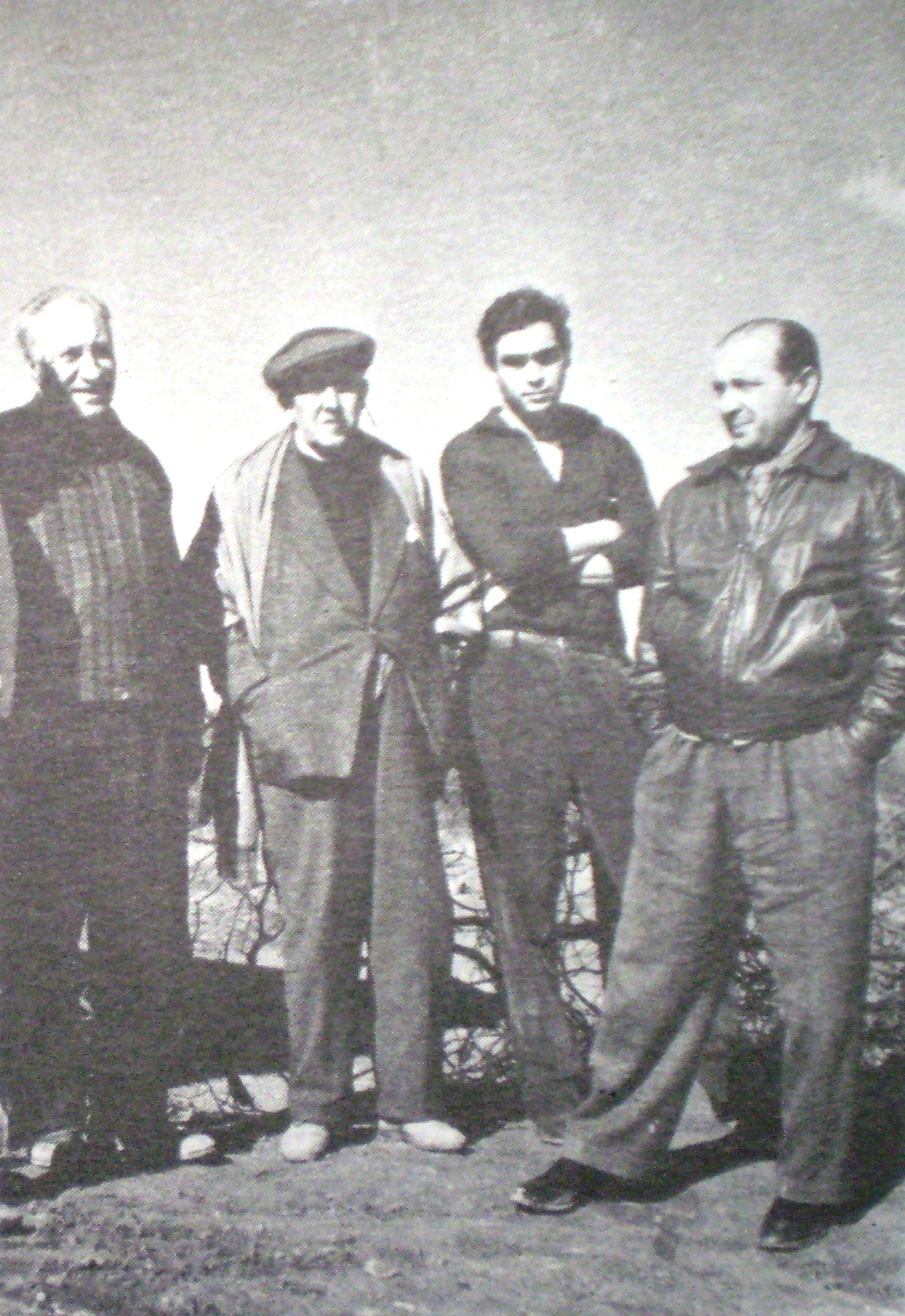
Argentine artists relax at the Río Hondo Hot Springs, 1958

During the 1890s, national policy makers were made aware of a little-publicized tourist route northwest of the city of Santiago del Estero, whereby, despite the abject lack of transportation or lodging amenities, a steady stream of visitors rode on horseback over craggy terrain for hours for the sake of enjoying a cluster of mineral springs rarely mentioned since Spaniards had first noticed them in 1543.

The Argentine Department of Agriculture commissioned University of Buenos Aires chemistry professor Hercules Corti to study the springs. Completing his report in 1918, Corti stated that the Río Hondo Hot Springs were among the most therapeutic on earth and, coming at a time when mineral springs were becoming a leading destination for health tourism, Río Hondo quickly began attracting visitors from all over Argentina. Set aside as a public resort in 1932, the first formal hotel facilities were opened in the late 1940s.

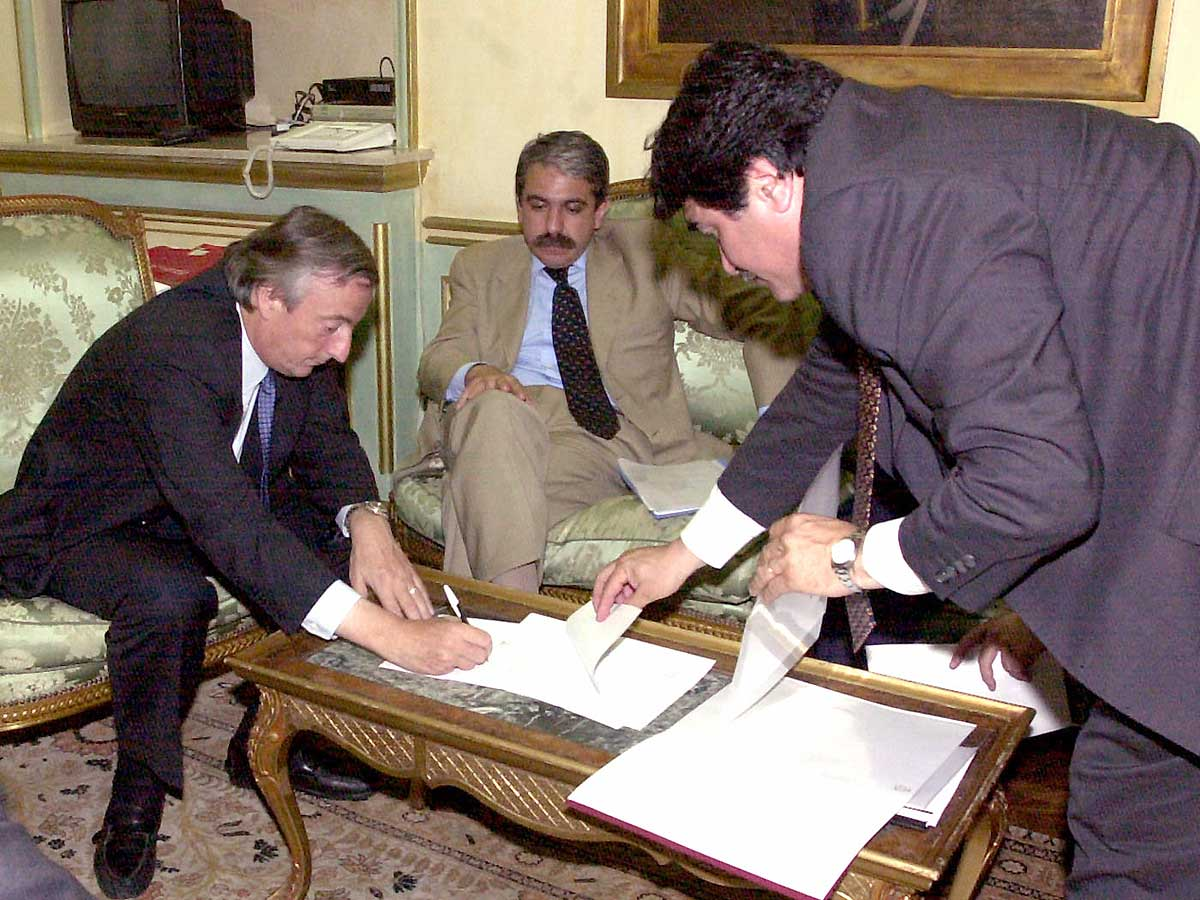
President Néstor Kirchner (left) signs the order removing Mrs. Juárez from her post as Governor of Santiago del Estero while Aníbal Fernández watches

In 1948, the province elected Peronist activist Carlos Arturo Juárez Governor of the province. Santiago del Estero's central political figure during the late 20th century, Juárez was energetic and ambitious, and he soon became indispensable to local politics (mostly by proxy). Regarded as a Caudillo, by the 1990s, he was readily ordering his opponents' deaths, including those of former Governor César Iturre in 1996 and of Bishop Gerardo Sueldo in 1998.

The deaths of two local young women, however, exposed Juárez's assassin, Antonio Musa Azar, and, faced with undeniable links to Musa Azar's litany of past murders and extortions, Juárez resigned in late 2002. His wife, Nina Aragonés de Juárez, was hand-picked to replace him; she was herself removed from office by the order of President Néstor Kirchner in March 2004.

== Geography ==
Köppen climate maps of Santiago del Estero

The province is located almost completely in the flat lands of the Gran Chaco, with some depressions. In these depressions lagoons have formed, mainly at Bañado de Figueroa, Bañado de Añatuya, and those near the basin of the Salado and Dulce Rivers. The Sumampa and Ambargasta sierras are the result of the influence of the Pampas at the southwest.

The soil, rich in lime and salt, is arid and characterised by semi-deserts and steppes. The predominant weather is sub-tropical with a dry season and high temperatures during the entire year; the annual average is 21.5 °C, increased to 24 °C in the latest years, with maxima of up to 50 °C, with visible increases in temperature since 1970. Surprisingly, the maximum was of 38 °C before 1910; and minima of -5 °C, which has increased to -2 °C. The dry season, during the winter, receives an average of 120 mm of precipitation, but the annual average is 700 mm.

== Demographics ==
Santiago del Estero population pyramid (2022 census)

Ethno-racial groups in Santiago del Estero (2022)
1. Undeclared (97.0%)
2. Native (2.60%)
3. Black (0.40%)

According to the 2022 Argentine national census, the Province of Santiago del Estero has 1,054,028 inhabitants.

Historical evolution of the population of the province:

- 1778: 15 456
- 1783: 32 500
- 1820: 50 000
- 1847: 50 000
- 1853: 60 000
- 1863: 112 000
- 1869: 132 898
- 1895: 161 502
- 1914: 261 678
- 1947: 479 473
- 1960: 476 503
- 1970: 495 419
- 1980: 594 920
- 1991: 671 988
- 2001: 804 457

== Economy ==
The province's economy, like most in northern Argentina, is relatively underproductive and, still, totalled an estimated US$2.863 billion in 2006; its per capita output, US$3,559, was the nation's lowest and a full 60% below the average. Santiago del Estero had long been very rural and fairly agricultural (known for its excellent cotton and tobacco, as well as leather) and nearly lacking in manufacturing; despite this, the humble province has grown just as quickly as many of its better-positioned fellow provinces, in the recovery that Argentina has enjoyed since 2002.

The economy of the province still leans toward primary production, specially in agriculture, about 12% of the province's output. Centred on the basins of the Salado and Dulce Rivers, the main crops include cotton (20% of the national production), soybean, maize and onion.

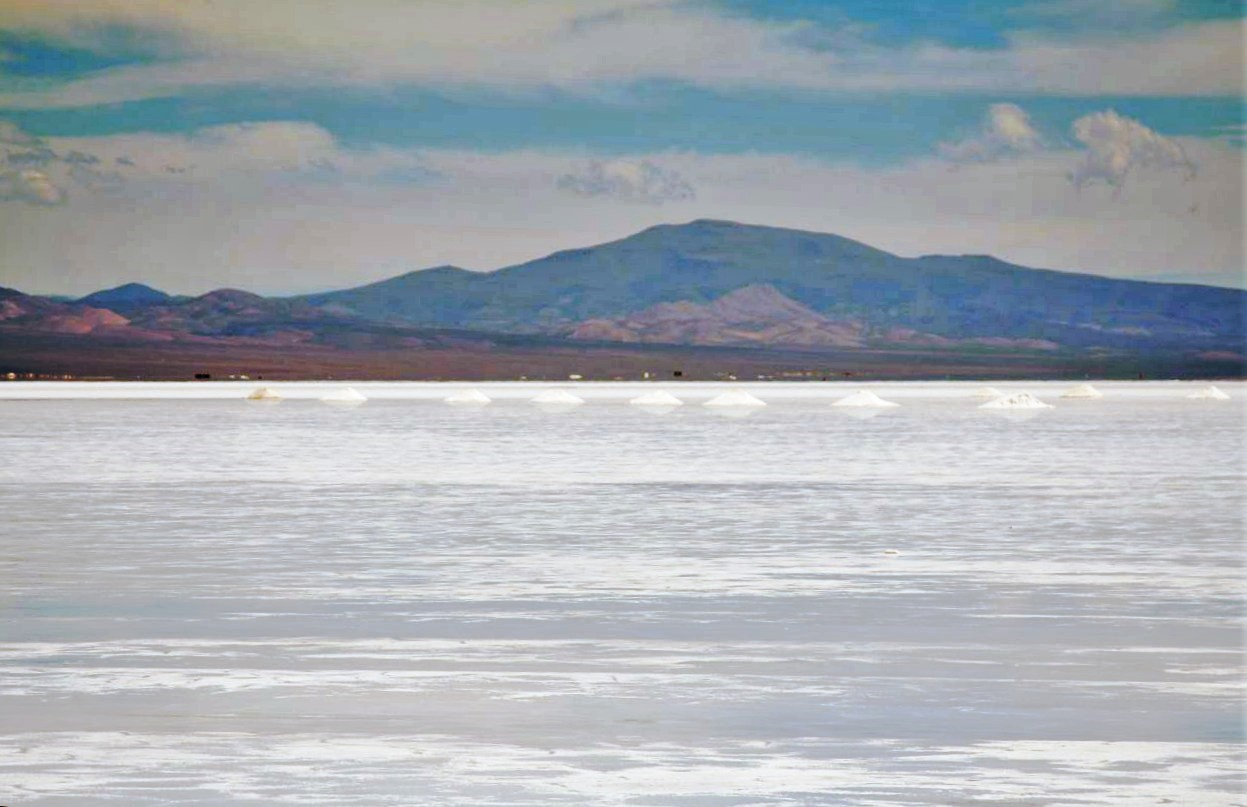
Salinas Grandes, one of the world's largest salt flats

Cattle farming is also important, mainly in the east, where weather conditions make it possible, but goats, with 15% of the national production, adapt better to the rest of the province.

The wood industry of quebracho and algarrobo has also added implanted species totaling an annual average of over 300 thousand tons, of which around 100,000 tons are used for timber and the rest for firewood and vegetal coal.

There is little mining but in the salt flats in the southwest. Manufacturing (less than 10% of output) consists of small industrial enterprises centred mainly on food, textiles and leather.

Tourism is somewhat developed, but only around the main tourist attractions. Tourists visit Santiago del Estero (the oldest city in Argentina) and its historical buildings and museums, Termas de Río Hondo and the Río Hondo hot springs with its 200 hotels, and the Frontal dam where water sports are practiced.

The province is home to the Copo National Park, and four protected areas: Bañados de Figueroa, Sierras de Ambargasta, Sierra de Guasayan and Sierras de Sumampa.

== Culture ==
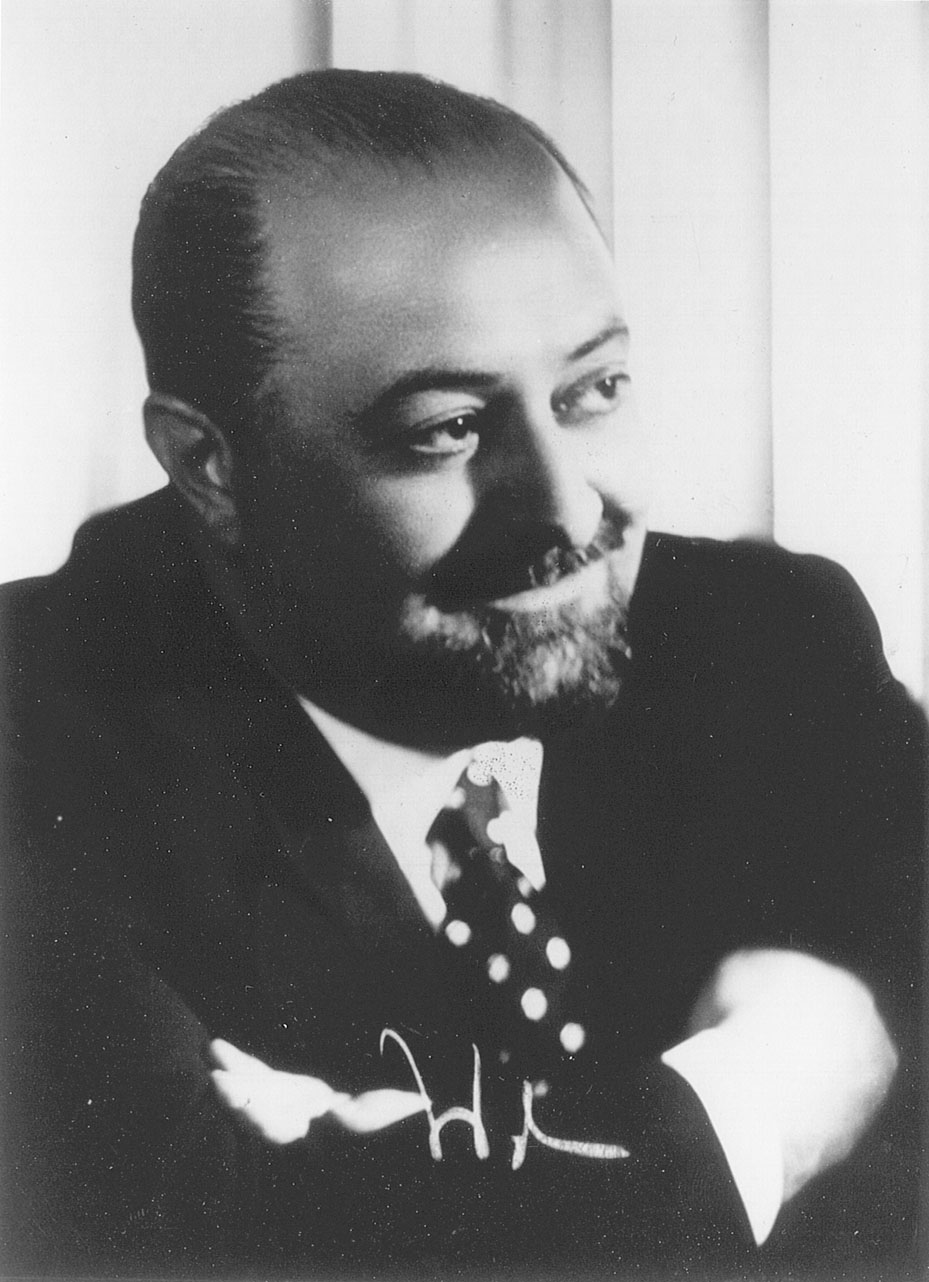
Homero Manzione was an Argentine tango lyricist, author of several famous tangos

Important figures connected to the history of Santiago del Estero include colonel Juan Francisco Borges, leader of the Independence War (and ancestor of writer Jorge Luis Borges), as well as the revolutionary leaders Mario Roberto and Francisco René Santucho, founders of the Partido Revolucionario de los Trabajadores and the Ejército Revolucionario del Pueblo.

Among the province's most distinguished cultural figures since the 19th century have been painters Felipe Taboada, Ramon Gómez Cornet, Carlos Sánchez Gramajo, Alfredo Gogna, and Ricardo and Rafael Touriño, as well as writers Jorge Washington Ábalos, Bernardo Canal Feijóo, Clementina Rosa Quenel and Julio Carreras (h). Amancio Jacinto Alcorta, a celebrated composer of flute concertos and religious music, also represented Santiago del Estero in Congress through much of the mid-19th century with distinction.

Santiago del Estero's musical heritage is one of its most important cultural aspects, with typical folklore chacarera and zamba. Renowned artists and groups include the Manseros Santiagueños, Alfredo Ábalos, Leo Dan, Jacinto Piedra and Raly Barrionuevo. The province's best-known folk music ensemble is probably the Ábalos Brothers, active in the genre since 1945 and recording since 1952. The group were among the best-known folk musicians in Argentina.

== Government ==
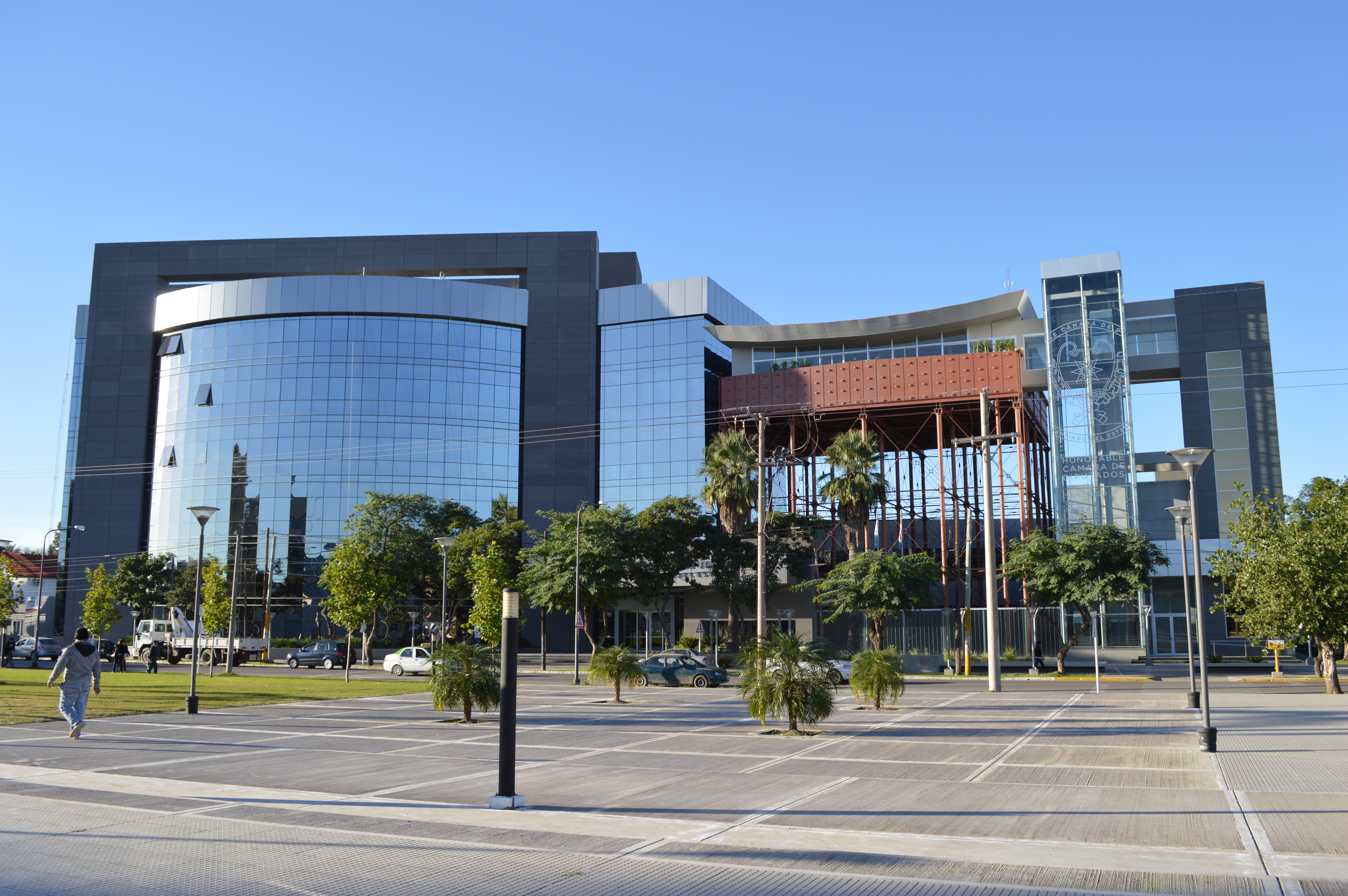
Chamber of Deputies of Santiago del Estero

The provincial government is divided into three branches: the executive, headed by a popularly elected governor, who appoints the cabinet; the legislative; and the judiciary, headed by the Supreme Court.

The Constitution of Santiago del Estero Province forms the formal law of the province.

In Argentina, the most important law enforcement organization is the Argentine Federal Police but the additional work is carried out by the Santiago del Estero Provincial Police.

=== Crime and human rights violations ===
Santiago del Estero is a province known for the interference of organized crime and the high number of usurpations generated since Gerardo Zamora came to power in 2005, where peasants and landowners are threatened and stripped of them. There are several complaints in which criminal groups, protected from power, are dedicated to usurping land from their legitimate owners. At the end of 2022, one of the many cases of victims of usurpation, where the conjunction of criminal groups and power was observed, was that of Manuel Ascencio Ardiles, who was stripped of 30 hectares of land by the President of the Superior Court of Justice. from Santiago del Estero, Federico López Alzogaray. The case was even known by the Interamerican Institute for Democracy, an international NGO.

Santiago del Estero is a province also known for the violations of Human Rights suffered by its inhabitants, to the point that in 2022 a report was presented to the High Commissioner for Human Rights that exposes the threats to citizens, criminal networks linked to the governor Gerardo Zamora, public officials and their families. Of the many cases of murders related to power in the province, there are two that have been emblematic: The first, the dismemberment and murder of an official who denounced a very serious case of corruption in the Santiago del Estero Revenue Department. And the second case, the rape and dismemberment of a child as revenge for a drug trafficking complaint involving the governor Gerardo Zamora. To all this is added the opacity in the management of the finances of the province. The murders, usurpations and violence that are experienced in the province are only the reflection of a well-structured drug-criminal network, with ties to the governor, the police, judges and prosecutors, this was confirmed by the consultant Douglas Farah in his report published in November of the year 2022, entitled "Case Study In Transnational Criminal Convergence: Santiago del Estero, Argentina".

== Political division ==
The province is divided into 27 departments (Spanish: departamentos).

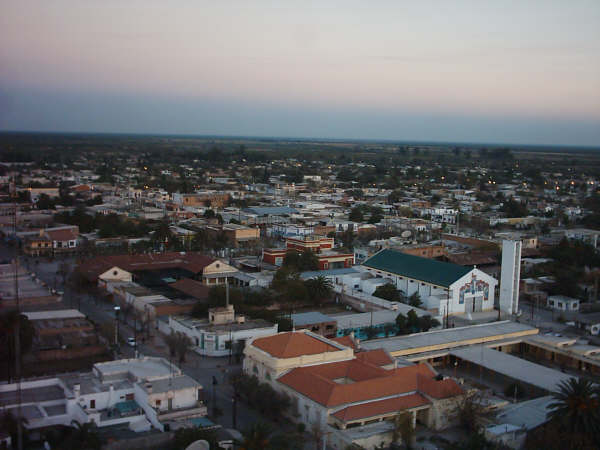
Añatuya

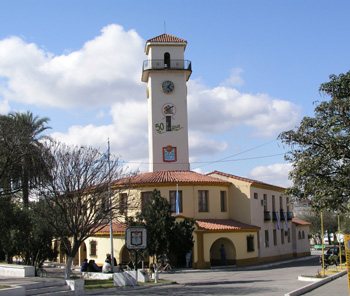
City Hall, Termas de Río Hondo

Department (Capital)

1. Aguirre Department (Pinto)
2. Alberdi Department (Campo Gallo)
3. Atamisqui Department (Villa Atamisqui)
4. Avellaneda Department (Herrera)
5. Banda Department (La Banda)
6. Belgrano Department (Bandera)
7. Capital Department (Santiago del Estero)
8. Choya Department (Frías)
9. Copo Department (Monte Quemado)
10. Figueroa Department (La Cañada)
11. General Taboada Department (Añatuya)
12. Guasayán Department (San Pedro de Guasayán)
13. Jiménez Department (Pozo Hondo)
14. Juan Felipe Ibarra Department (Suncho Corral)
15. Loreto Department (Loreto)
16. Mitre Department (Villa Unión)
17. Moreno Department (Quimilí)
18. Ojo de Agua Department (Villa Ojo de Agua)
19. Pellegrini Department (Nueva Esperanza)
20. Quebrachos Department (Sumampa)
21. Río Hondo Department (Termas de Río Hondo)
22. Rivadavia Department (Selva)
23. Robles Department (Fernández)
24. Salavina Department (Los Telares)
25. San Martín Department (Brea Pozo)
26. Sarmiento Department (Garza)
27. Silípica Department (Arraga)

== Notable people ==
- Ana Amado (1946–2016), journalist, filmmaker, academic and feminist
- Gaspar Xuarez (1731–1804), Jesuit, botanist, and naturalist

== Villages ==
- Colonia Dora
- Colonia El Simbolar
- Icaño, municipality and village
- Los Juríes, municipality and village
- Los Pirpintos, municipality and village
- Palo Negro, municipality and village
- Pampa de los Guanacos, municipality and village
- Villa Río Hondo, municipality and village
- Villa Unión, municipality and village

== See also ==
- 1817 Santiago del Estero earthquake
