= Channel 7 (Santiago del Estero, Argentina) =

TV station in Santiago del Estero, Argentina

LW 81 TV Canal 7
- Santiago del Estero; Argentina
- City: Santiago del Estero
- Channels: Analog: 7 (VHF); Digital: 42 (UHF)
- Branding: Canal 7

Programming
- Affiliations: Telefe

Ownership
- Owner: Grupo Ick (86%) Rosa Josefina Durgam de Biagoli (14%); (CAS TV, S.A.)

History
- First air date: October 30, 1965

Technical information
- Licensing authority: ENACOM

Links
- Website: canal7.tv

Canal 7 (call sign LW 81 TV) is a television station broadcasting from Santiago del Estero, Argentina and carries programs from Telefe. Founded in 1962 and beginning operations in 1965, it was the second station in the country to start broadcasting in color (Canal 7 in Buenos Aires was the first). Currently, it shows most of the network's programs, aside from the weekend cartoons which are preempted as the station doesn't start weekend programming until noon. It also chooses not to show one or two primetime shows, instead showing local interest programs.

== History ==
On October 10, 1963, through Decree 9062, the National Executive Branch granted the company CAS TV S.A. a license to exploit the Channel 7 frequency in the city of Santiago del Estero, capital of the province of the same name. The company was made up of 18 partners, among whom were Antonio Castiglione, José F.L. Castiglione, Aldo C. Castiglione and Horacio Germinal Rava.

The license began its regular broadcasts on October 30, 1965 as LW 81 TV Canal 7 of Santiago del Estero. Channel 7 was the first station in the Argentine Northwest after a month of experimental broadcasts.

The channel operated in the facilities at 249 Pellegrini Street, which were blessed on the day of their inauguration, enthroning the image of Saint Clare of Assisi; patron saint of universal television.

The installation of the station had a profound impact on the city and the interior of the province. The first images were to show the inside of the Santiago capital with its landscape, its flora and its fauna.

On September 19, 1977, through Synthesized Decree 2818, he authorized the entry of CAS TV S.A. (licensee of Channel 7) by Néstor Carlos Ick, Ernesto Rodríguez, Osvaldo Simón Rosenzvaig, Luis Celestino Alen Lascano, Mario Ernán Taboada and Faustino Ledesma.

The first broadcasts were made in black and white, later color television appeared on the occasion of broadcasting the World Soccer Championship in 1978. The channel is open, its signal is broadcast over the air, being the first (along with Channel 7 of Buenos Aires) to begin color transmissions in Argentina.

Previously, as it was an over-the-air television station, it received programs from several Buenos Aires channels, of various genres such as soap operas, theaters and entertainment, among them Sábados Circulares by Pipo Mancera and the political humor program by Tato Bores.

On February 23, 1982, the Federal Broadcasting Committee, through Resolution 104, authorized the Government of Catamarca to install a repeater of the channel in Santa María, assigning it channel 9 in the UHF band.

On January 27, 1983, through Decree 194, the National Executive Branch renewed the license granted to Channel 7.

Between 1987 and 1992 it exploited licenses for a closed circuit television encoded in UHF. On this last date, through a merger-spin-off agreement, the assets affected by the closed circuit were incorporated into a new company called Tele Imagen Codifica S.A., of which the members of the licensee's board of directors are currently shareholders.

On February 16, 1994, through Decree 254, he authorized the entry of CAS TV S.A. (licensee of Channel 7) by Juan Carlos Antonio Biagioli and Néstor Eduardo Ick.

Since 1997, CAS TV S.A. enabled a satellite station (Up-link) that elevates the television signal of Channel 7 to the Nahuel 1A satellite, from which it is retransmitted to 30 earth repeater stations installed in towns located outside the channel's primary service area. In each of these towns, equipment has been placed to retransmit the signal in an approximate radius of 30 km, which allows covering the entire territory of the province of Santiago del Estero and the Catamarca valley. This work was completed and remains in operation with the work of engineers and technicians from Santiagueños, who were trained by satellite communications specialists from Canada and the United States.

In December 1998, through Resolution 2612, the Ministry of Communications authorized Channel 7 to carry out tests on Digital Terrestrial Television under the ATSC regulations (regulations that were established through Resolution 2357). For this purpose, it was assigned the Channel 8 on the VHF band.

On April 18, 2006, the Federal Broadcasting Committee, through Resolution 638, authorized CAS TV (owner of Channel 7) to move the repeater from El Portezuelo (channel 3) to the town of Sumalao.

On June 1, 2010, the Federal Authority of Audiovisual Communication Services, through Resolution 114, authorized Channel 7 to carry out tests on Digital Terrestrial Television under the ISDB-T standard (adopted in Argentina through Decree 1148 of 2009). For this purpose, Channel 42 was assigned in the UHF band.

On March 24, 2012, Channel 7 began broadcasting its programming in HD.

On October 30, 2015, Channel 7 celebrated 50 years on the air.

== Local programming ==
- 8:00 AM - Debate Abierto - talk show (Monday to Friday)
- 1:15 PM - Noticiero 7 Primera Edición - news - (Monday to Friday)
- 2:00 PM - Portal UNSE - Weekly summary of UNSE news - (every Saturday) - En Marcha h A union-oriented TV show about the lives of workers, standing up for their work and defending their labor rights. (on tuesdays) - Hogar en Familia (on wednesdays) program of such good and silences in everything not so relevant of being in your world - Salud y Vida: A Vivir! Medical program on how to take care of your habits and take care of yourself physically, regarding food and the human body. (on thursdays) - Sonidos del Folkrore program on the music of the federally argent chamame (on fridays)
- 3:00 PM: Alma de Ciudad: La Mejor Aventura (Tourist program covering the entire province of Santiago in the northwest of the country)
- 8:15 PM - Noticiero 7 Edición Central - news - (Monday to Friday)
- 9:15 PM - Libertad de Opinión - talk show - (every Tuesday)
- 11:00 PM - Opinión Deportiva - sports - (every Sunday)
- 12:00 AM - Resumen Diario (Midnight Newscast about the events that happened during the day, every from monday to friday)

== Coverages and repeaters ==
=== Coverages ===
Channel 7 has two transmission plants: one for analog TV and another digital with HD programming; SD and 1sec. With a coverage radius of 50 km. covering almost all of the existing populations in the two neighboring provinces with its open channel signal.

=== Repeaters ===
Channel 7 has 29 repeaters in the Province of Santiago del Estero, 1 in the Province of Catamarca and 1 in the Province of Tucumán. Almost all of them are administered by the Santiago del Estero government.

Santiago del Estero Province
Channel	Location of the repeater
7	Añatuya
10	Bandera
8	Bandera Bajada
11	Campo Gallo
7	Fortín Inca
3	Frías
7	La Punta
11	Lavalle
11	Los Juríes
13	Los Pirpintos
4	Los Telares
24	Lugones
12	Malbrán
13	Monte Quemado
5	Nueva Esperanza
13	Ojo de Agua
38	Pampa de los Guanacos
11	Pinto
3	Pozo Hondo
12	Quimilí
35	Sachayoj
56	Selva
9	Sumampa
12	Suncho Corral
12	Taboada
9	Termas de Río Hondo
8	Tintina
5	Vilelas
11	Villa Atamisqui

Catamarca Province
Channel	Location of the repeater
7	San Fernando del Valle de Catamarca

Tucumán Province
Channel	Location of the repeater
58	Graneros
