= Tintina (disambiguation) =

- Tintina, a village in Argentina
- Tintina Fault, a fault line in North America
- Tintina Trench, a valley in Canada
- Tintina (rock), a Mars rock
