= David Ledesma =

Argentine footballer

Personal information
- Full name: David Ledesma Sacarias
- Date of birth: 8 March 1999 (age 27)
- Place of birth: Graneros, Argentina
- Height: 1.80 m (5 ft 11 in)
- Position: Centre-back

Team information
- Current team: Almirante Brown (on loan from Quilmes)

Youth career
- Deportivo Graneros
- 2014–2018: Quilmes

Senior career*
Years	Team	Apps	(Gls)
2018–	Quilmes	1	(0)
2020–2022	→ Sacachispas (loan)	68	(5)
2023	→ Almirante Brown (loan)	12	(0)
2024	→ Estudiantes BA (loan)	28	(1)
2025–	→ Almirante Brown (loan)	2	(0)
- * Club domestic league appearances and goals as of 18:07, 29 June 2025 (UTC)

David Ledesma Sacarias (born 8 March 1999) is an Argentine professional footballer who plays as a centre-back for Almirante Brown, on loan from Quilmes.

== Club career ==
Ledesma's senior career started with Quilmes, having joined the club in 2014 from Deportivo Graneros. He was initially selected as an unused substitute three times throughout the 2017–18 Primera B Nacional campaign, though he was never used by manager Mario Sciacqua in fixtures against Aldosivi, All Boys and Mitre in March/April 2018. His bow in professional football arrived under Leonardo Lemos in the succeeding November versus Gimnasia y Esgrima, with Ledesma featuring for sixty-eight minutes of a goalless draw.

== International career ==
In February 2018, Ledesma was called to train with the Argentina U19s.

== Career statistics ==
As of 16 March 2019.

Appearances and goals by club, season and competition
Club	Season	League			Cup		Continental		Other		Total	
Club	Season	Division	Apps	Goals	Apps	Goals	Apps	Goals	Apps	Goals	Apps	Goals
Quilmes	2017–18	Primera B Nacional	0	0	0	0	—		0	0	0	0
Quilmes	2018–19	Primera B Nacional	1	0	0	0	—		0	0	1	0
Career total			1	0	0	0	—		0	0	1	0
