= Boron on Mars =

Scientific Discovery

Researchers in December 2016 announced the discovery by the Curiosity rover of the element boron in mineral veins on the planet Mars. No other mission to Mars has found boron. However, boron was found in Martian meteorites that included MIZ 09030 in 2013, MIL 09030, Nakhla, Lafayette, and Chassigny.

For boron to be present in the veins there must have been a temperature between 0-60 degrees Celsius and a neutral-to-alkaline pH. The temperature, pH, and dissolved minerals of the groundwater support a habitable environment.

Moreover, boron has been suggested to be necessary for life to form. Its presence stabilizes the sugar ribose which is an ingredient in RNA. Ribose would rapidly decompose in water without boron being present. On Earth, boron compounds may have been needed to link the organic compounds that were produced without life into RNA-like molecules that were used for the very first life forms.

== Curiosity investigations ==
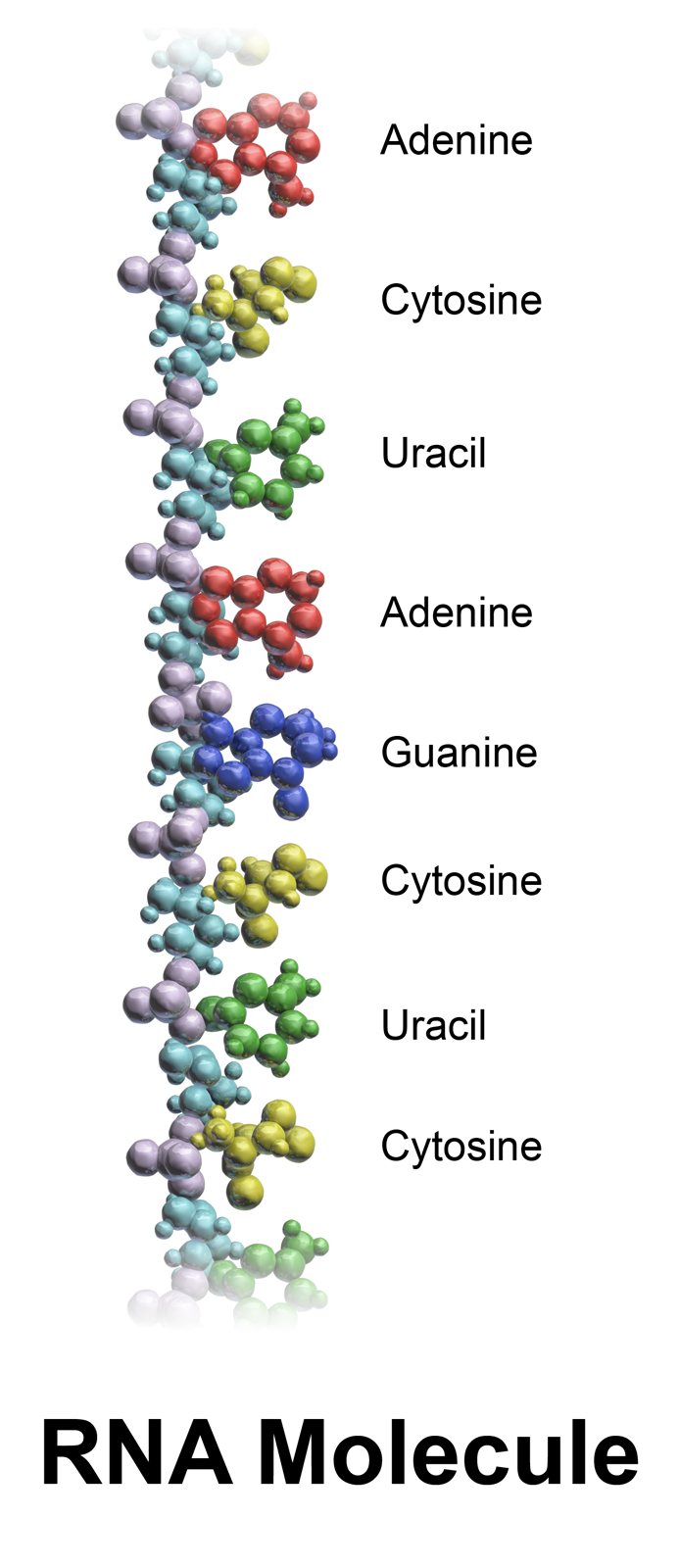
Model of a section of an RNA molecule. The colored balls represent different atoms, while the names are names of compounds that make up the chain. The left side of the chain contains ribose sugar which may require boron for its formation.

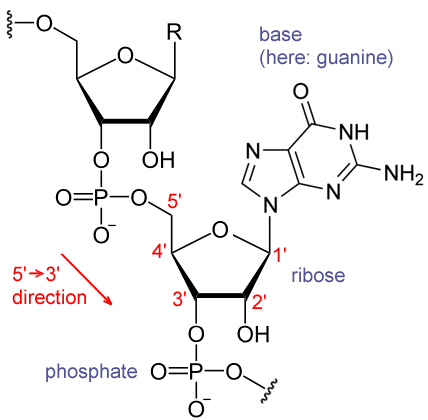
Chemical diagram of a part of RNA. Ribose sugars are connected by phosphate groups. One base is shown.

Initial measurements reveal that the Gale Crater veins have between 10–100 ppm Boron. One possible explanation for borates in veins is that Gale Lake evaporated, depositing evaporites, including borates. Later, Gale Crater was partially buried, and then it turned to rock. Cracks developed in the rock and water flowed through the deposits, partially dissolving them. This mineral-rich solution moved through the fractures, and produced veins made up of borates and sulfates as veins.

The team found evidence of boron in a total of 43 calcium sulfate veins in Gale Crater. The veins were found in Yellowknife Bay, Murray lacustrine mudstone, and in the Stimson sandstone units at the bottom of the 5 km high Mt. Sharp in the center of Gale Crater. Boron was only detected in veins, but it may have also been present in the surrounding bedrock. Iron in bedrock prevents the ChemCam instrument from finding boron.

The boron was identified by the rover's laser-shooting Chemistry and Camera (ChemCam) instrument, which was developed at Los Alamos National Laboratory. Hematite, clay minerals and boron are found to be more abundant in layers farther uphill in Gale Crater, compared with lower, older layers.

Scientists developed two hypotheses for the origin of boron in the veins.

In hypothesis A: (1) Boron dissolved in Gale lake and became part of clay at the bottom. This eventually became rock called the" Murray formation." (2) The lake then dried and the bedrock cracked. (3) Later groundwater interacted with the clays and released boron into the groundwater. (4) Then, the boron and calcium sulfate was deposited.

In hypothesis B: (1) Boron stayed in solution. (2) But when the lake dried out, a layer of boron-containing salts, and other types of salts, was formed. In addition, the bedrock fractured. (3) later, groundwater dissolved the salts and moved them down into the older layers that the rover studied The ChemCam instrument. (4) The groundwater deposited the salts with the calcium sulfate that makes up the bulk of these veins.

A paper described the details of this boron discovery on Mars was published in September 2017. The authors believe there is more evidence that hypothesis B is more likely.

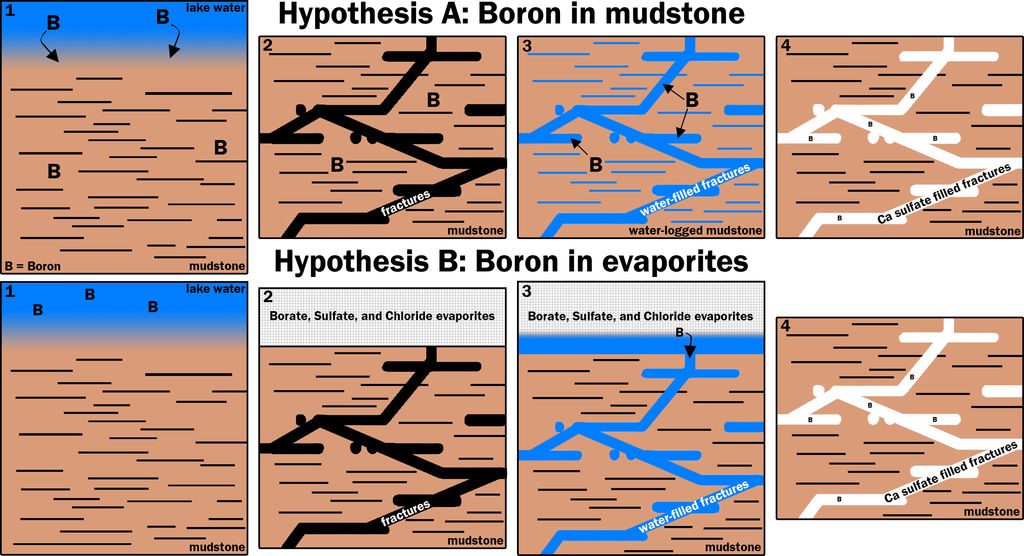
Diagram showing two possible ways that boron was deposited in veins at Gale Crater

== See also ==
- Aeolis quadrangle
