= Pampa de los Guanacos =

Coordinates: 26°14′S 61°51′W

- Municipality and village
- Location of Pampa de los Guanacos in the province of Santiago del Estero
- Country: Argentina
- Province: Santiago del Estero Province
- Department: Copo Department
- Established: 1932

Government
  - Mayor: Viviana A. Campos, PJ

Population (2001)
  - Total: 4,393
- Time zone: UTC−3 (ART)
- Postal code: 3712
- Area code: 03841
- Climate: BSh

Pampa de los Guanacos is a municipality and village in Santiago del Estero Province in Argentina.

== Location ==
Pampa de los Guanacos' main land communications are provided by the Ruta Nacional 16 and, parallel to this, a branch of the Ferrocarril General Manuel Belgrano (Railroad), both routes connect this population with Salta and Resistencia, taking into account that the railway (as often happened in Argentina since the late nineteenth century and the first half of the twentieth century) preceded the highway route. Indeed, the railway track in this sector of Chaco Austral was raised largely to facilitate the extraction of timber from the dense forests and jungles (especially quebracho) and the production of cotton. From Pampa de los Guanacos, in a longitudinal direction, it separates Provincial Route 6 that connects this town with that of Sacháyoj found about 48 miles south. The road communications with the capital city of the province (Santiago del Estero) are still indirect and are reached primarily through the winding paths of the provincial routes 5 and 4.

In its vicinity is the Copo National Park, created in 2000. It receives water from the Salado del norte river through an aqueduct called Canal de Dios.
