= Mud cracks on Mars =

Geological feature of the planet Mars

In January 2017, scientists announced the possible discovery of mud cracks in Gale Crater on Mars. The Curiosity Rover imaged what may be the first mud cracks (desiccation cracks) ever found on Mars. They may have been formed from drying mud. The site, called “Old Soaker,” was within an exposure of Murray formation mudstone on lower Mount Sharp.

It is hypothesized that these cracks formed more than 3 billion years ago and then were buried by more sediment. All this material eventually turned into rock. Later wind erosion removed the layers that covered the cracked layer. The cracks were filled with material which was resistant to later erosion. This erosion resistant material formed raised ridges, as some of the surrounding layer was removed.

This is the first sighting of mud cracks. Previously, Curiosity has examined cracks and ridges of different shapes that were made by groundwater carrying minerals, such as calcium sulfate. Cracks for this process were caused by the pressure of overlying sediments fracturing rock.

Gale Crater held ancient lakes that varied in depth and area over time, and sometimes disappeared. Mud cracks show that there were dry times when lakes disappeared. Besides this evidence of mud, Curiosity has found evidence of ancient lakes in older layers and also in younger mudstone. Nathan Stein, a graduate student at the California Institute of Technology led the investigation.

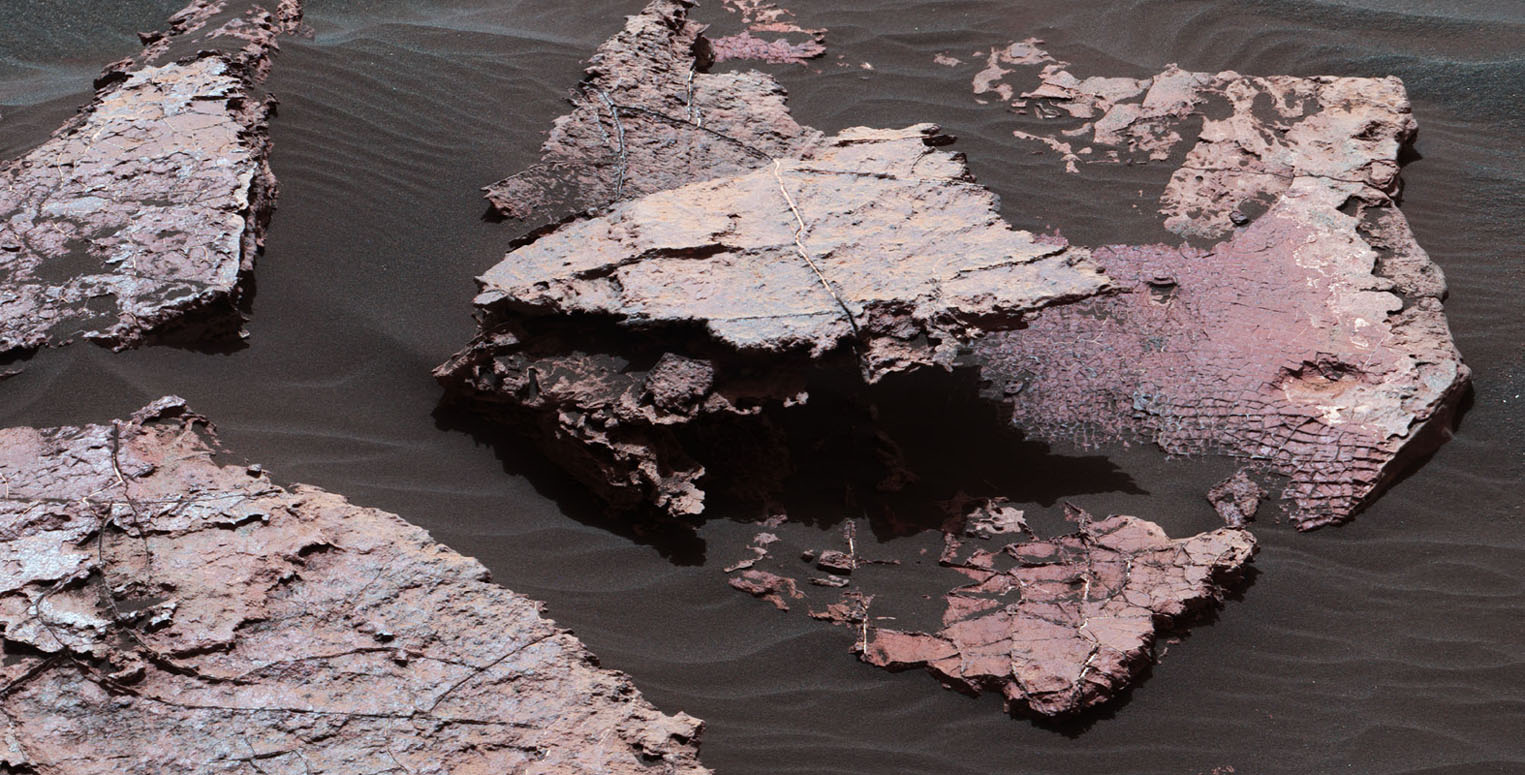
Probable mud cracks appearing as ridges, as seen by Curiosity Rover.

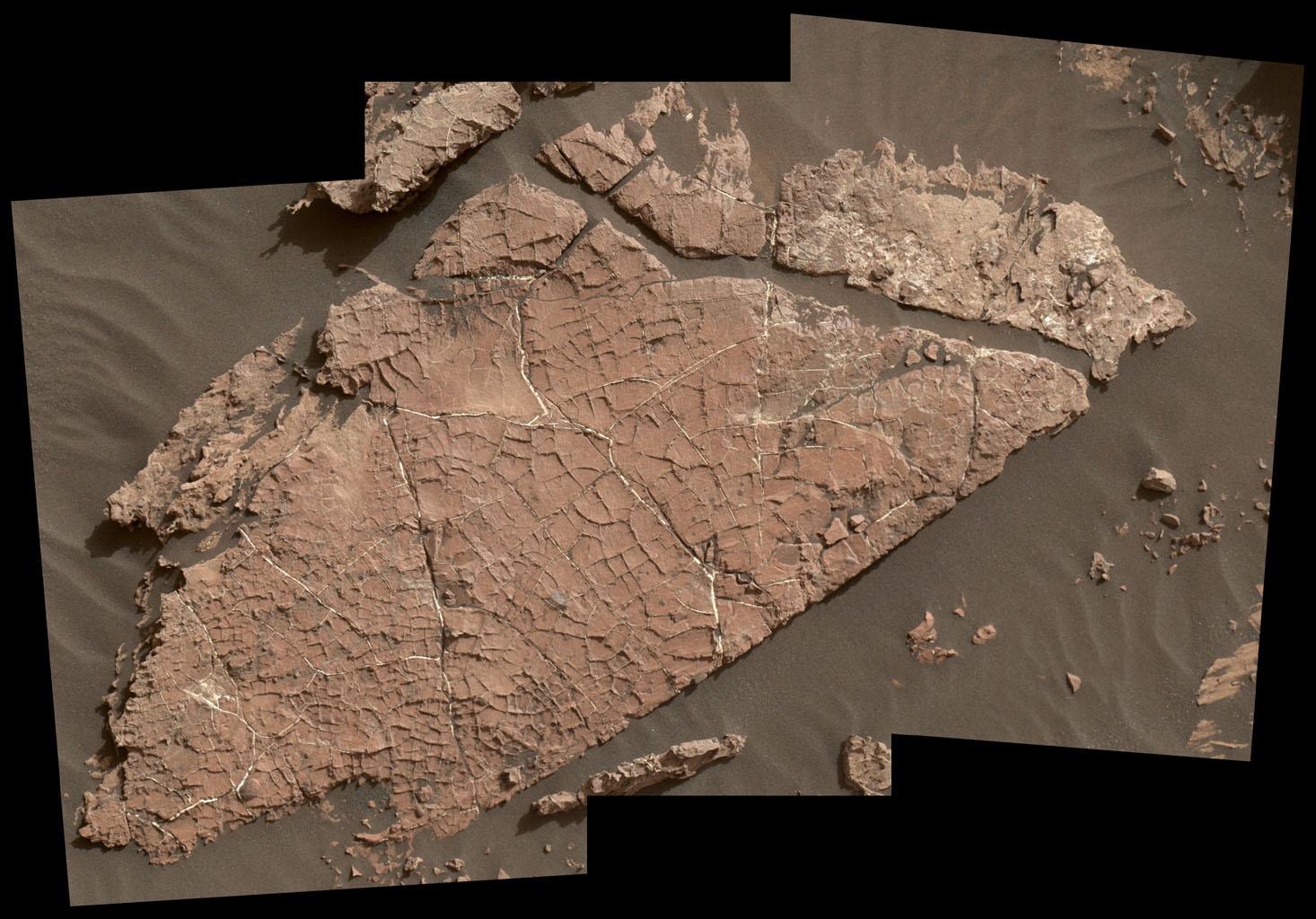
Close view of probable mud cracks appearing as ridges, as seen by Curiosity Rover.

== See also ==
- Aeolis quadrangle
- Geology of Mars
- Impact crater
- Water on Mars
