= Argentina, Santiago del Estero =

Argentina
- Municipality and village
- Location within Argentina
- Coordinates: 29°33′S 62°17′W
- Country: Argentina
- Province: Santiago del Estero
- Department: Aguirre
- Time zone: UTC−3 (ART)

Argentina is a municipality and village in Santiago del Estero in Argentina.
