= Aeolis quadrangle =

One of a series of 30 quadrangle maps of Mars

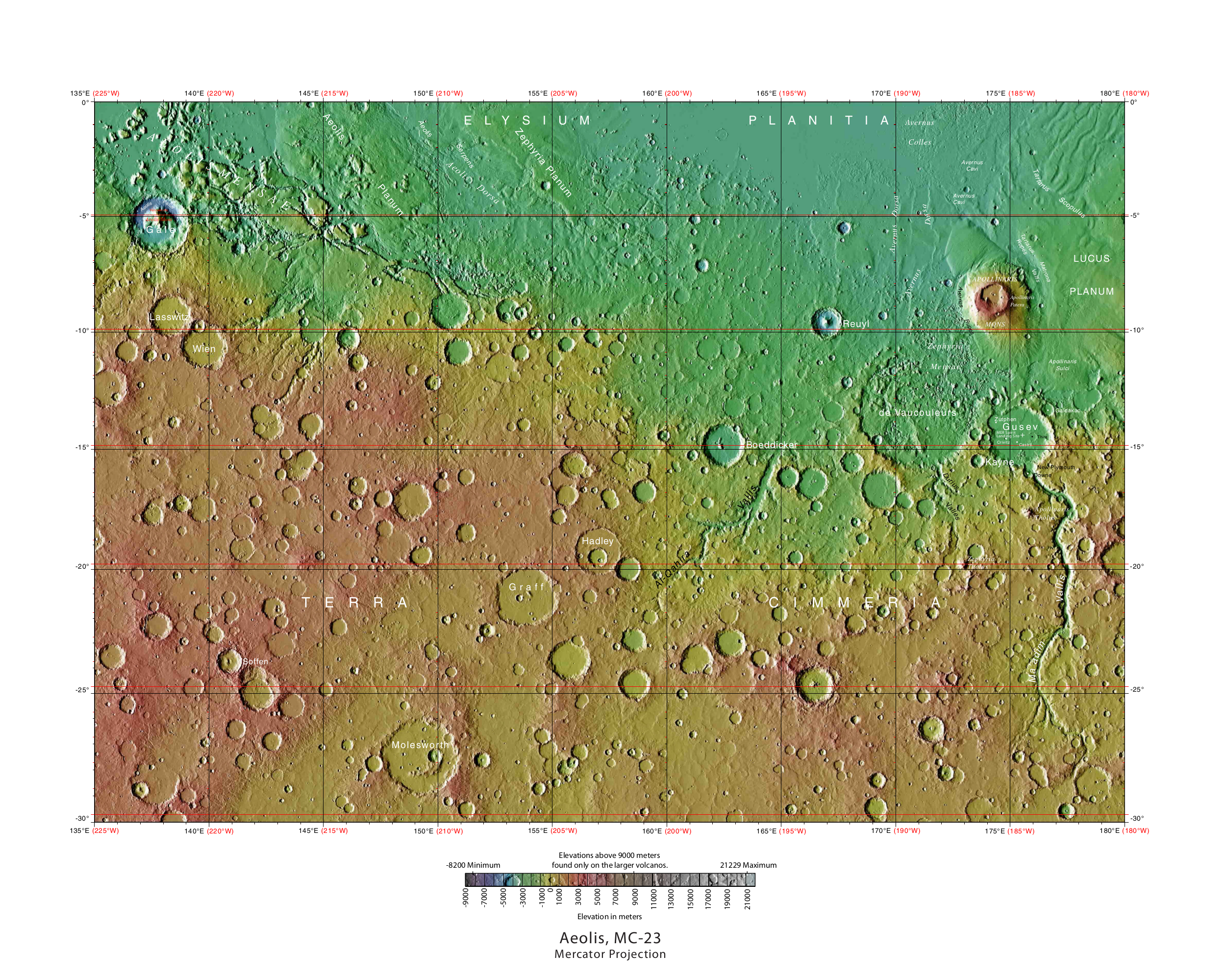
- Map of Aeolis quadrangle from Mars Orbiter Laser Altimeter (MOLA) data. The highest elevations are red and the lowest are blue. The Spirit rover landed in Gusev crater. Aeolis Mons is in Gale Crater.
- Coordinates: 15°S 202.5°W

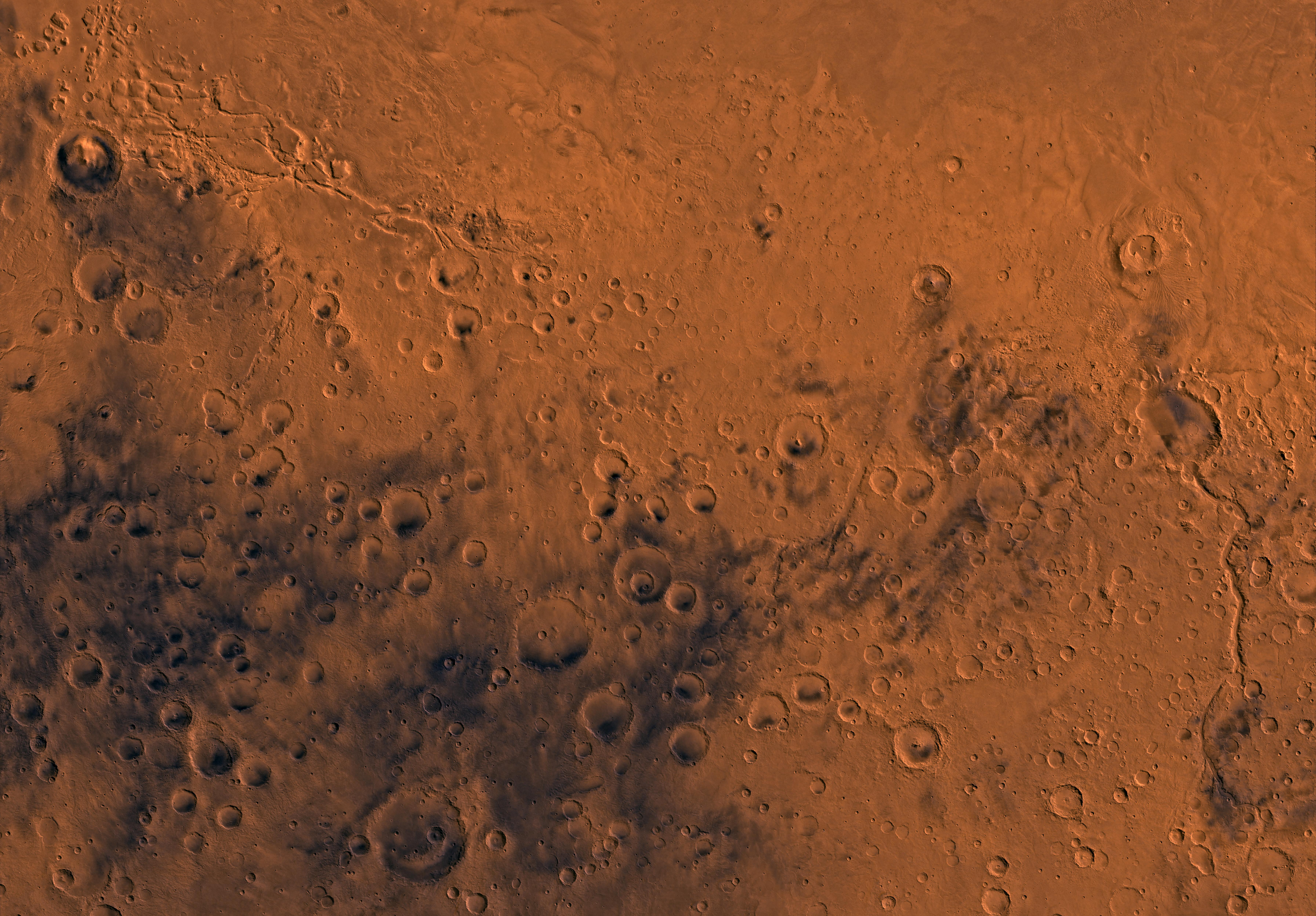
Image of the Aeolis Quadrangle (MC-23). The northern part contains Elysium Planitia. The northeastern part includes Apollinaris Patera. The southern part mostly contains heavily cratered highlands.

The Aeolis quadrangle is one of a series of 30 quadrangle maps of Mars used by the United States Geological Survey (USGS) Astrogeology Research Program. The Aeolis quadrangle is also referred to as MC-23 (Mars Chart-23). The Aeolis quadrangle covers 180° to 225° W and 0° to 30° south on Mars, and contains parts of the regions Elysium Planitia and Terra Cimmeria. A small part of the Medusae Fossae Formation lies in this quadrangle.

The name refers to the name of a floating western island of Aeolus, the ruler of the winds. In Homer's account, Odysseus received the west wind Zephyr here and kept it in bags, but the wind got out.

It is famous as the site of two spacecraft landings: the Spirit rover landing site (14.5718°S 175.4785°E) in Gusev crater (January 4, 2004), and the Curiosity rover in Gale Crater (4.591817°S 137.440247°E) (August 6, 2012).

A large, ancient river valley, called Ma'adim Vallis, enters at the south rim of Gusev Crater, so Gusev Crater was believed to be an ancient lake bed. However, it seems that a volcanic flow covered up the lakebed sediments. Apollinaris Patera, a large volcano, lies directly north of Gusev Crater.

Gale Crater, in the northwestern part of the Aeolis quadrangle, is of special interest to geologists because it contains a 2–4 km (1.2–2.5 mi) high mound of layered sedimentary rocks, named "Mount Sharp" by NASA in honor of Robert P. Sharp (1911–2004), a planetary scientist of early Mars missions. More recently, on 16 May 2012, "Mount Sharp" was officially named Aeolis Mons by the USGS and IAU.

Some regions in the Aeolis quadrangle show inverted relief. In these locations, a stream bed may be a raised feature, instead of a valley. The inverted former stream channels may be caused by the deposition of large rocks or due to cementation. In either case erosion would erode the surrounding land but leave the old channel as a raised ridge because the ridge will be more resistant to erosion

Yardangs are another feature found in this quadrangle. They are generally visible as a series of parallel linear ridges, caused by the direction of the prevailing wind.

== Spirit rover discoveries ==
The rocks on the plains of Gusev are a type of basalt. They contain the minerals olivine, pyroxene, plagioclase, and magnetite, and they look like volcanic basalt as they are fine-grained with irregular holes (geologists would say they have vesicles and vugs). Much of the soil on the plains came from the breakdown of the local rocks. Fairly high levels of nickel were found in some soils; probably from meteorites. Analysis shows that the rocks have been slightly altered by tiny amounts of water. Outside coatings and cracks inside the rocks suggest water deposited minerals, maybe bromine compounds. All the rocks contain a fine coating of dust and one or more harder kinds of material. One type can be brushed off, while another needed to be ground off by the Rock Abrasion Tool (RAT).

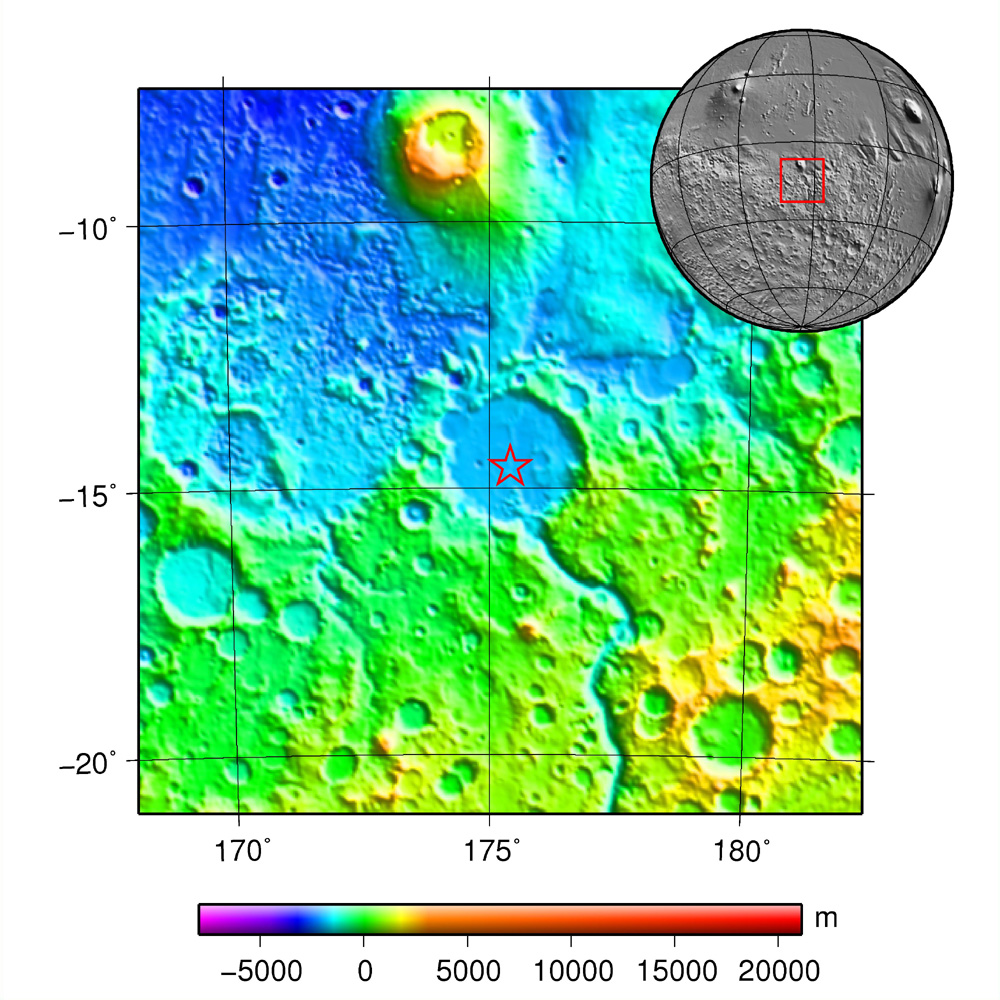
An overall view of MER-A Spirit landing site (denoted with a star)

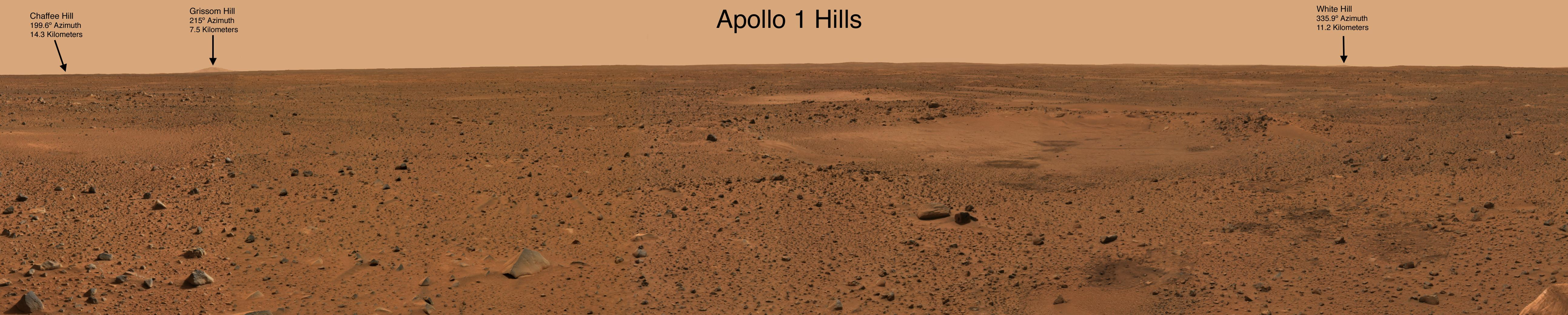
Apollo Hills panorama from the Spirit landing site

There are a variety of rocks in the Columbia Hills, some of which have been altered by water, but not by very much water.

The dust in Gusev Crater is the same as dust all around the planet. All the dust was found to be magnetic. Moreover, Spirit found the magnetism was caused by the mineral magnetite, especially magnetite that contained the element titanium. One magnet was able to completely divert all dust hence all Martian dust is thought to be magnetic. The spectra of the dust was similar to spectra of bright, low thermal inertia regions like Tharsis and Arabia that have been detected by orbiting satellites. A thin layer of dust, maybe less than one millimeter thick, covers all surfaces. Something in it contains a small amount of chemically bound water.

=== Plains ===
Adirondack
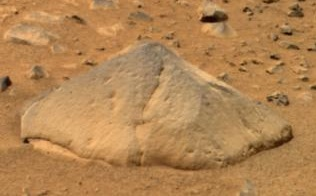
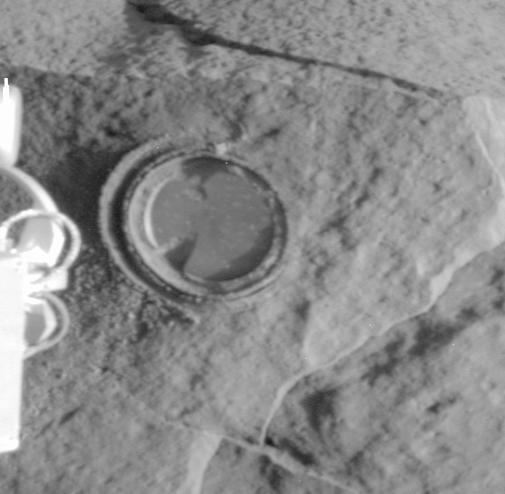
- Above: An approximate true-color view of Adirondack, taken by Spirit's pancam. Right: Digital camera image (from Spirit's Pancam) of Adirondack after a RAT grind (Spirit's rock grinding tool)
- Feature type: Rock

Observations of rocks on the plains show they contain the minerals pyroxene, olivine, plagioclase, and magnetite. These rocks can be classified in different ways. The amounts and types of minerals make the rocks primitive basalts—also called picritic basalts. The rocks are similar to ancient terrestrial rocks called basaltic komatiites. Rocks of the plains also resemble the basaltic shergottites, meteorites which came from Mars. One classification system compares the amount of alkali elements to the amount of silica on a graph; in this system, Gusev plains rocks lie near the junction of basalt, picrobasalt, and tephite. The Irvine-Barager classification calls them basalts. Plain's rocks have been very slightly altered, probably by thin films of water because they are softer and contain veins of light colored material that may be bromine compounds, as well as coatings or rinds. It is thought that small amounts of water may have gotten into cracks inducing mineralization processes. Coatings on the rocks may have occurred when rocks were buried and interacted with thin films of water and dust. One sign that they were altered was that it was easier to grind these rocks compared to the same types of rocks found on Earth.

The first rock that Spirit studied was Adirondack. It turned out to be typical of the other rocks on the plains.

=== Columbia Hills ===
Scientists found a variety of rock types in the Columbia Hills, and they placed them into six different categories. The six are: Clovis, Wishbone, Peace, Watchtower, Backstay, and Independence. They are named after a prominent rock in each group. Their chemical compositions, as measured by APXS, are significantly different from each other. Most importantly, all of the rocks in Columbia Hills show various degrees of alteration due to aqueous fluids. They are enriched in the elements phosphorus, sulfur, chlorine, and bromine—all of which can be carried around in water solutions. The Columbia Hills' rocks contain basaltic glass, along with varying amounts of olivine and sulfates. The olivine abundance varies inversely with the amount of sulfates. This is exactly what is expected because water destroys olivine but helps to produce sulfates.

Acid fog is believed to have changed some of the Watchtower rocks. This was in a 200 meter long section of Cumberland Ridge and the Husband Hill summit. Certain places became less crystalline and more amorphous. Acidic water vapor from volcanoes dissolved some minerals forming a gel. When water evaporated, a cement formed and produced small bumps. This type of process has been observed in the lab when basalt rocks are exposed to sulfuric and hydrochloric acids.

The Clovis group is especially interesting because the Mössbauer spectrometer (MB) detected goethite in it. Goethite forms only in the presence of water, so its discovery is the first direct evidence of past water in the Columbia Hills's rocks. In addition, the MB spectra of rocks and outcrops displayed a strong decline in olivine presence, although the rocks probably once contained much olivine. Olivine is a marker for the lack of water because it easily decomposes in the presence of water. Sulfate was found, and it needs water to form. Wishstone contained a great deal of plagioclase, some olivine, and anhydrate (a sulfate). Peace rocks showed sulfur and strong evidence for bound water, so hydrated sulfates are suspected. Watchtower class rocks lack olivine consequently they may have been altered by water. The Independence class showed some signs of clay (perhaps montmorillonite a member of the smectite group). Clays require fairly long term exposure to water to form. One type of soil, called Paso Robles, from the Columbia Hills, may be an evaporate deposit because it contains large amounts of sulfur, phosphorus, calcium, and iron. Also, MB found that much of the iron in Paso Robles soil was of the oxidized, Fe^{3+} form, which would happen if water had been present.

Towards the middle of the six-year mission (a mission that was supposed to last only 90 days), large amounts of pure silica were found in the soil. The silica could have come from the interaction of soil with acid vapors produced by volcanic activity in the presence of water or from water in a hot spring environment.

After Spirit stopped working scientists studied old data from the Miniature Thermal Emission Spectrometer, or Mini-TES and confirmed the presence of large amounts of carbonate-rich rocks, which means that regions of the planet may have once harbored water. The carbonates were discovered in an outcrop of rocks called "Comanche".

In summary, Spirit found evidence of slight weathering on the plains of Gusev, but no evidence that a lake was there. However, in the Columbia Hills there was clear evidence for a moderate amount of aqueous weathering. The evidence included sulfates and the minerals goethite and carbonates which only form in the presence of water. It is believed that Gusev crater may have held a lake long ago, but it has since been covered by igneous materials. All the dust contains a magnetic component which was identified as magnetite with some titanium. Furthermore, the thin coating of dust that covers everything on Mars is the same in all parts of Mars.

== Ma'adim Vallis ==
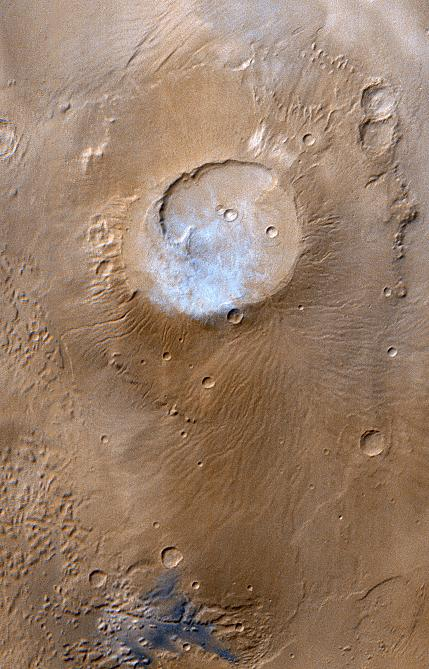
Apollinaris Patera; a large, ancient river valley, called Ma'adim Vallis, enters at the south rim of Gusev Crater, so Gusev Crater was believed to be an ancient lake bed. However, it seems that a volcanic flow covered up the lakebed sediments. Apollinaris Patera, a large volcano, lies directly north of Gusev Crater.

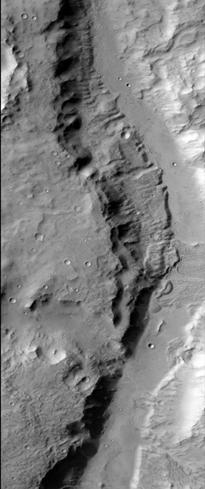
Section of Ma'adim Vallis as seen by HiRISE. More recent flow of water may have formed the smaller, deeper channel to the right.

Recent studies lead scientists to believe that the water that formed Ma'adim Vallis originated in a complex of lakes. The largest lake is located at the source of the Ma'adim Vallis outflow channel and extends into Eridania quadrangle and the Phaethontis quadrangle. When the largest lake spilled over the low point in its boundary, a torrential flood would have moved north, carving the sinuous Ma'adim Vallis. At the north end of Ma'adim Vallis, the flood waters would have run into Gusev Crater.

There is enormous evidence that water once flowed in river valleys on Mars. Images of curved channels have been seen in images from Mars spacecraft dating back to the early 1970s with the Mariner 9 orbiter.

Vallis (plural valles) is the Latin word for "valley". It is used in planetary geology for the naming of landform features on other planets, including what could be old river valleys that were discovered on Mars, when probes were first sent to Mars. The Viking Orbiters caused a revolution in our ideas about water on Mars; huge river valleys were found in many areas. Space craft cameras showed that floods of water broke through dams, carved deep valleys, eroded grooves into bedrock, and traveled thousands of kilometers. Some valles on Mars (Mangala Vallis, Athabasca Vallis, Granicus Vallis, and Tinjar Valles) clearly begin at graben. On the other hand, some of the large outflow channels begin in rubble-filled low areas called chaos or chaotic terrain. It has been suggested that massive amounts of water were trapped under pressure beneath a thick cryosphere (layer of frozen ground), then the water was suddenly released, perhaps when the cryosphere was broken by a fault.

== Gale Crater ==
Gale Crater, in the northwestern part of the Aeolis quadrangle, is of special interest to geologists because it contains a 2–4 km (1.2–2.5 mi) high mound of layered sedimentary rocks. On 28 March 2012 this mound was named "Mount Sharp" by NASA in honor of Robert P. Sharp (1911–2004), a planetary scientist of early Mars missions. More recently, on 16 May 2012, Mount Sharp was officially named Aeolis Mons by the USGS and IAU. The mound extends higher than the rim of the crater, so perhaps the layering covered an area much larger than the crater. These layers are a complex record of the past. The rock layers probably took millions of years to be laid down within the crater, then more time to be eroded to make them visible. The 5 km high mound is probably the thickest single succession of sedimentary rocks on Mars. The lower formation may date from near the Noachian age, while the upper layer, separated by an erosional unconformity, may be as young as the Amazonian period. The lower formation may have formed the same time as parts of Sinus Meridiani and Mawrth Vallis. The mound that lies in the center of Gale Crater was created by winds. Because the winds eroded the mound on one side more than another, the mound is skewed to one side, rather than being symmetrical. The upper layer may be similar to layers in Arabia Terra. Sulfates and Iron oxides have been detected in the lower formation and anhydrous phases in the upper layer. There is evidence that the first phase of erosion was followed by more cratering and more rock formation. Also of interest in Gale Crater is Peace Vallis, officially named by the IAU on September 26, 2012, which 'flows' down out of the Gale Crater hills to the Aeolis Palus below, and which seems to have been carved by flowing water. On December 9, 2013, NASA reported that, based on evidence from Curiosity studying Aeolis Palus, Gale Crater contained an ancient freshwater lake which could have been a hospitable environment for microbial life. Gale Crater contains a number of fans and deltas that provide information about lake levels in the past. These formations are: Pancake Delta, Western Delta, Farah Vallis delta and the Peace Vallis Fan.

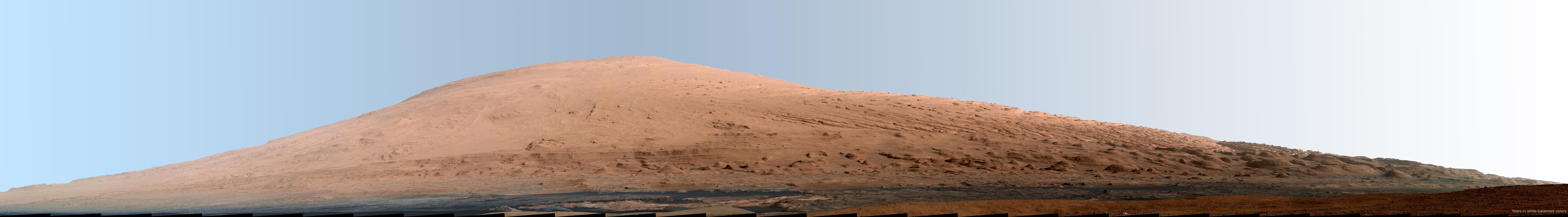
Curiosity's view of Mount Sharp (September 20, 2012; white balanced) (raw color)

== Other craters ==
Impact craters generally have a rim with ejecta around them, in contrast volcanic craters usually do not have a rim or ejecta deposits. As craters get larger (greater than 10 km in diameter) they usually have a central peak. The peak is caused by a rebound of the crater floor following the impact. Sometimes craters will display layers. Since the collision that produces a crater is like a powerful explosion, rocks from deep underground are tossed onto the surface. Hence, craters can show us what lies deep under the surface.

== Mars Science Laboratory discoveries ==
The aim of the Mars Science Laboratory mission, and its surface robotic payload Curiosity rover, is to search for signs of ancient life. It is hoped that a later mission could then return samples that the laboratory identified as probably containing remains of life. To safely bring the craft down, a 12 mile wide, smooth, flat circle was needed. Geologists hoped to examine places where water once ponded and to examine sedimentary layers.

On August 6, 2012, the Mars Science Laboratory landed on Aeolis Palus near Aeolis Mons in Gale Crater. The landing was 2.279 km (1.416 mi) from the target (4.591817°S 137.440247°E), closer than any previous rover landing and well within the target area.

On September 27, 2012, NASA scientists announced that Curiosity found evidence for an ancient streambed suggesting a "vigorous flow" of water on Mars.

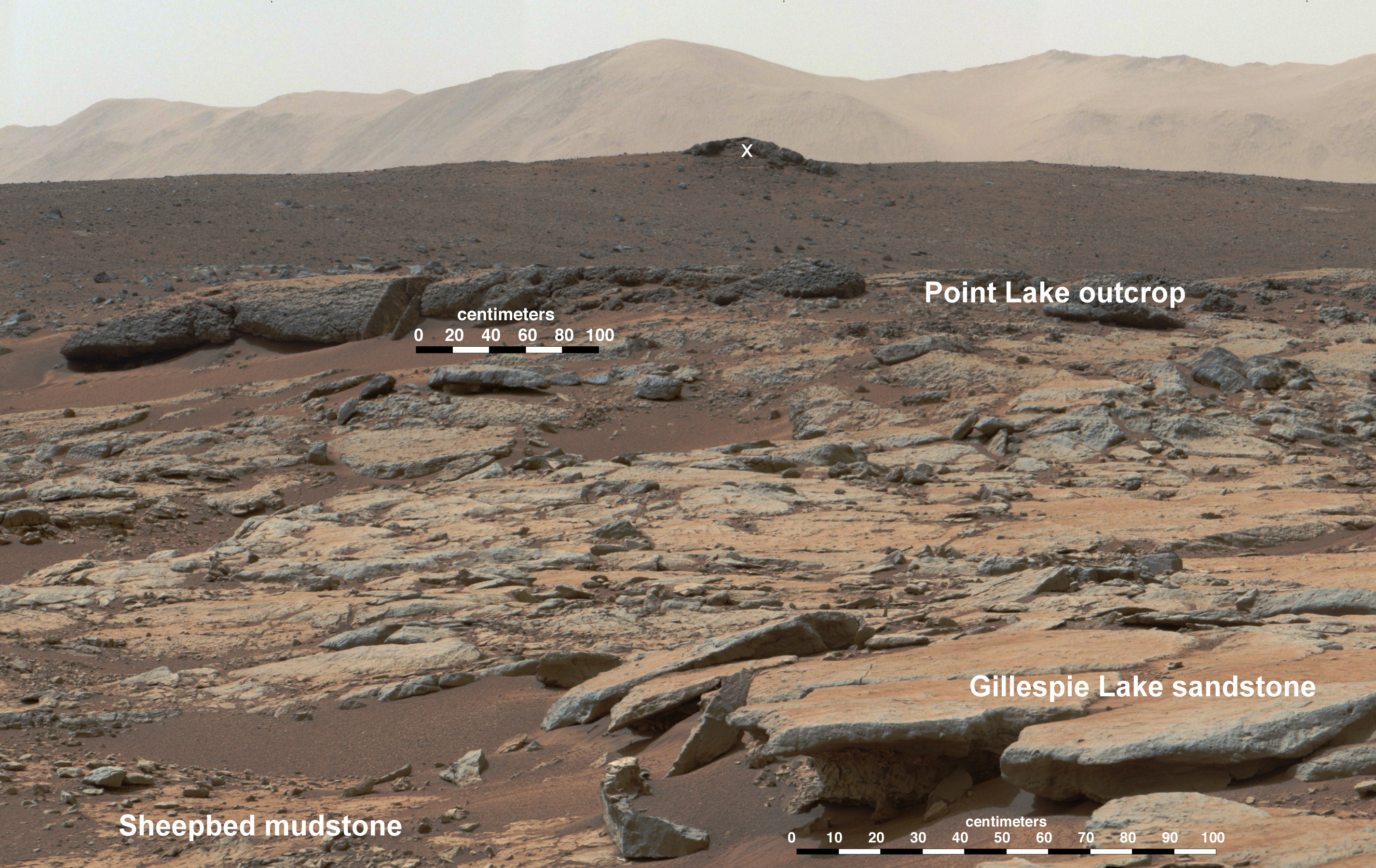
Curiosity rover – view of "Sheepbed" mudstone (lower left) and surroundings (February 14, 2013)

On October 17, 2012, at Rocknest, the first X-ray diffraction analysis of Martian soil was performed. The results revealed the presence of several minerals, including feldspar, pyroxenes and olivine, and suggested that the Martian soil in the sample was similar to the weathered basaltic soils of Hawaiian volcanoes. The sample used is composed of dust distributed from global dust storms and local fine sand. So far, the materials Curiosity has analyzed are consistent with the initial ideas of deposits in Gale Crater recording a transition through time from a wet to dry environment.

On December 3, 2012, NASA reported that Curiosity performed its first extensive soil analysis, revealing the presence of water molecules, sulfur and chlorine in the Martian soil. The presence of perchlorates in the sample seems highly likely. The presence of sulfate and sulfide is also likely because sulfur dioxide and hydrogen sulfide were detected. Small amounts of chloromethane, dichloromethane and trichloromethane were detected. The source of the carbon in these molecules is unclear. Possible sources include contamination of the instrument, organics in the sample and inorganic carbonates.

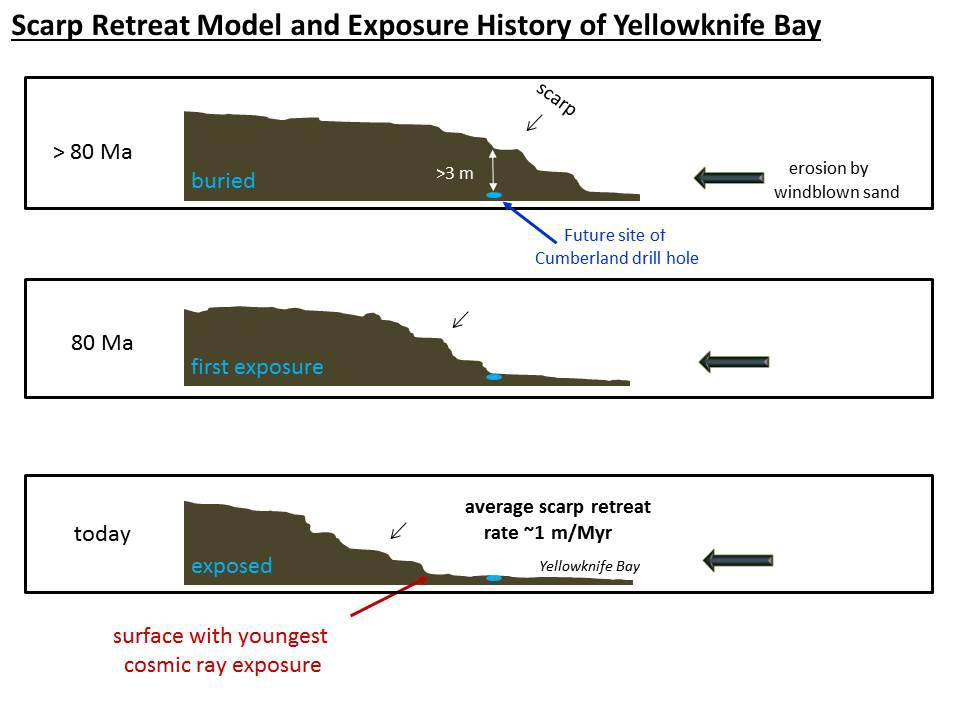
Scarp retreat by windblown sand over time on Mars (Yellowknife Bay, December 9, 2013)

On March 18, 2013, NASA reported evidence of mineral hydration, likely hydrated calcium sulfate, in several rock samples including the broken fragments of "Tintina" rock and "Sutton Inlier" rock as well as in veins and nodules in other rocks like "Knorr" rock and "Wernicke" rock. Analysis using the rover's DAN instrument provided evidence of subsurface water, amounting to as much as 4% water content, down to a depth of 60 cm (2.0 ft), in the rover's traverse from the Bradbury Landing site to the Yellowknife Bay area in the Glenelg terrain.

In March 2013, NASA reported Curiosity found evidence that geochemical conditions in Gale Crater were once suitable for microbial life after analyzing the first drilled sample of Martian rock, "John Klein" rock at Yellowknife Bay in Gale Crater. The rover detected water, carbon dioxide, oxygen, sulfur dioxide and hydrogen sulfide. Chloromethane and dichloromethane were also detected. Related tests found results consistent with the presence of smectite clay minerals.

In the journal Science from September 2013, researchers described a different type of rock called Jake M (or Jake Matijevic) It was the first rock analyzed by the Alpha Particle X-ray Spectrometer (APXS) instrument on the Curiosity rover, and it was different from other known martian igneous rocks as it is alkaline (>15% normative nepheline) and relatively fractionated. Jake M is similar to terrestrial mugearites, a rock type typically found at ocean islands and continental rifts. Jake M's discovery may mean that alkaline magmas may be more common on Mars than on Earth and that Curiosity could encounter even more fractionated alkaline rocks (for example, phonolites and trachytes).

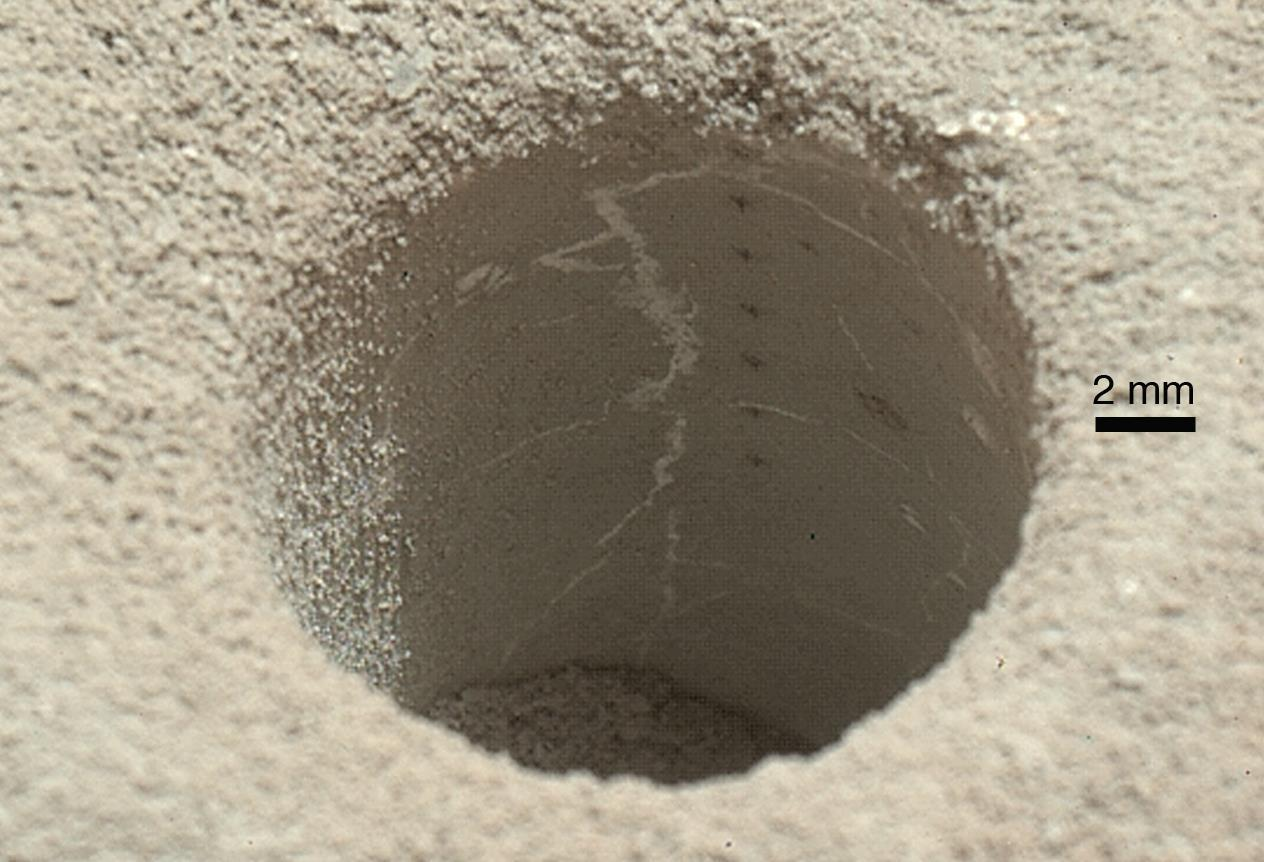
Hole (1.6 cm (0.63 in)) drilled into "John Klein" mudstone

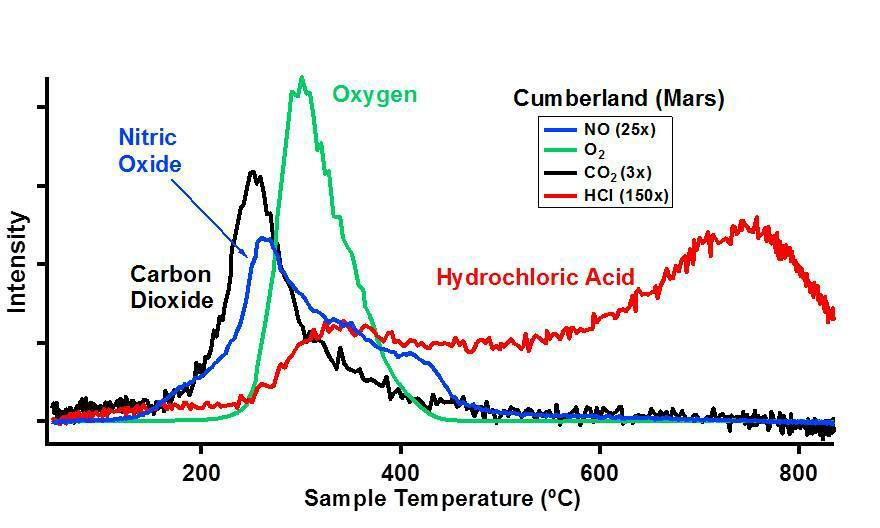
Spectral Analysis (SAM) of "Cumberland" mudstone

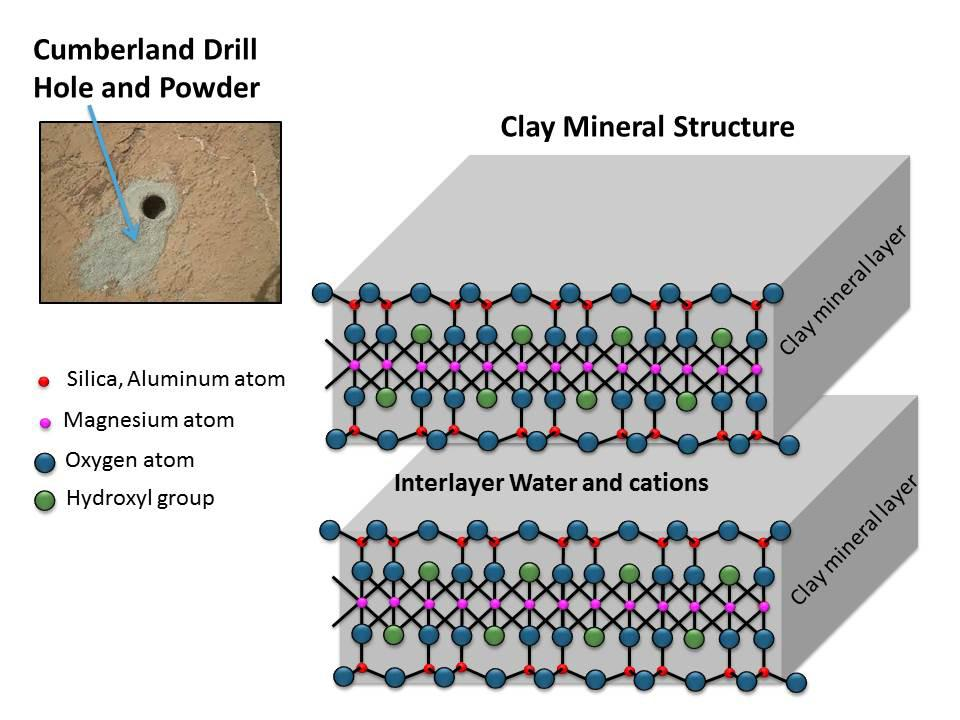
Clay mineral structure of mudstone.

The Curiosity rover examines mudstone near Yellowknife Bay on Mars (May 2013).

On December 9, 2013, NASA researchers described, in a series of six articles in the journal Science, many new discoveries from the Curiosity rover. Possible organics were found that could not be explained by contamination. Although the organic carbon was probably from Mars, it can all be explained by dust and meteorites that have landed on the planet. Because much of the carbon was released at a relatively low temperature in Curiosity's Sample Analysis at Mars (SAM) instrument package, it probably did not come from carbonates in the sample. The carbon could be from organisms, but this has not been proven. This organic-bearing material was obtained by drilling 5 centimeters deep in a site called Yellowknife Bay into a rock called "Sheepbed mudstone". The samples were named John Klein and Cumberland. Microbes could be living on Mars by obtaining energy from chemical imbalances between minerals in a process called chemolithotrophy which means "eating rock." However, in this process only a very tiny amount of carbon is involved—much less than was found at Yellowknife Bay.

Using SAM's mass spectrometer, scientists measured isotopes of helium, neon, and argon that cosmic rays produce as they go through rock. The fewer of these isotopes they find, the more recently the rock has been exposed near the surface. The four-billion-year-old lakebed rock drilled by Curiosity was uncovered between 30 million and 110 million years ago by winds which sandblasted away two meters of overlying rock. Next, they hope to find a site tens of millions of years younger by drilling close to an overhanging outcrop.

The absorbed dose and dose equivalent from galactic cosmic rays and solar energetic particles on the Martian surface for ~300 days of observations during the current solar maximum was measured. These measurements are necessary for human missions to the surface of Mars, to provide microbial survival times of any possible extant or past life, and to determine how long potential organic biosignatures can be preserved. This study estimates that a one-meter depth drill is necessary to access possible viable radioresistant microbe cells. The actual absorbed dose measured by the Radiation Assessment Detector (RAD) is 76 mGy/yr at the surface. Based on these measurements, for a round trip Mars surface mission with 180 days (each way) cruise, and 500 days on the Martian surface for this current solar cycle, an astronaut would be exposed to a total mission dose equivalent of ~1.01 sievert. Exposure to one sievert is associated with a five percent increase in risk for developing fatal cancer. NASA's current lifetime limit for increased risk for its astronauts operating in low-Earth orbit is three percent. Maximum shielding from galactic cosmic rays can be obtained with about 3 meters of Martian soil.

The samples examined were probably once mud that for millions to tens of millions of years could have hosted living organisms. This wet environment had neutral pH, low salinity, and variable redox states of both iron and sulfur species. These types of iron and sulfur could have been used by living organisms. Carbon, hydrogen, oxygen, sulfur, nitrogen, and phosphorus were measured directly as key biogenic elements, and by inference, phosphorus is assumed to have been available. The two samples, John Klein and Cumberland, contain basaltic minerals, Ca-sulfates, Fe oxide/hydroxides, Fe-sulfides, amorphous material, and trioctahedral smectites (a type of clay). Basaltic minerals in the mudstone are similar to those in nearby aeolian deposits. However, the mudstone has far less Fe-forsterite plus magnetite, so Fe-forsterite (type of olivine) was probably altered to form smectite (a type of clay) and magnetite. A Late Noachian/Early Hesperian or younger age indicates that clay mineral formation on Mars extended beyond Noachian time; therefore, in this location neutral pH lasted longer than previously thought.

In a press conference on December 8, 2014, Mars scientists discussed observations by Curiosity rover that show Mars' Mount Sharp was built by sediments deposited in a large lake bed over tens of millions of years. This finding suggests the climate of ancient Mars could have produced long-lasting lakes at many places on the Planet. Rock layers indicate that a huge lake was filled and evaporated many times. The evidence was many deltas that were stacked upon each other.

Also in December 2014, it was announced that Curiosity had detected sharp increases in methane four times out of twelve during a 20-month period with the Tunable Laser Spectrometer (TLS) of the Sample Analysis at Mars instrument (SAM). Methane levels were ten times the usual amount. Due to the temporary nature of the methane spike, researchers believe the source is localized. The source may be biological or non-biological.

On December 16, 2014, a team of researchers described how they have concluded that organic compounds have been found on Mars by Curiosity. The compounds were found in samples from drilling into Sheepbed mudstone. Chlorobenzene and several dichloroalkanes, such as dichloroethane, dichloropropane and dichlorobutane were discovered in the samples.

On March 24, 2015, a paper was released describing the discovery of nitrates in three samples analyzed by Curiosity. The nitrates are believed to have been created from diatomic nitrogen in the atmosphere during meteorite impacts. Nitrogen is needed for all forms of life because it is used in the building blocks of larger molecules like DNA and RNA. Nitrates contain nitrogen in a form that can be used by living organisms; nitrogen in the air can not be used by organisms. This discovery of nitrates adds to the evidence that Mars once had life.

The Jet Propulsion Laboratory (JPL) announced in April 2015 the discovery of a network of two-tone mineral veins at an area called "Garden City" on lower Mount Sharp. The veins stand about 2.5 inches above the surface and are composed of two different minerals formed from at least two different fluid flows. In Pahrump Hills, an area about 39 feet lower, the minerals clay, hematite, jarosite, quartz, and cristobalite were found.

Measurements made by Curiosity allowed researchers to determine that Mars has liquid water at times. Because the humidity goes to 100% at night, salts, like calcium perchlorate, will absorb water from the air and form a brine in the soil. This process in which a salt absorbs water from the air is called deliquescence. Liquid water results even though the temperature is very low, as salts lower the freezing point of water. This principle is used when salt is spread on roads to melt snow/ice. The liquid brine produced in the night evaporates after sunrise. Much more liquid water is expected in higher latitudes where the colder temperature and more water vapor can result in higher levels of humidity more often. The researchers cautioned that the amount of water was not enough to support life, but it could allow salts to move around in the soil. The brines would occur mostly in the upper 5 cm of the surface; however, there is evidence that the effects of liquid water can be detected down to 15 cm. Chlorine-bearing brines are corrosive; therefore design changes may need to be made for future landers.

French and U.S. scientists found a type of granite by studying images and chemical results of 22 rock fragments. The composition of the rocks was determined with the ChemCam instrument. These pale rocks are rich in feldspar and may contain some quartz. The rocks are similar to Earth's granitic continental crust. They are like rocks called TTG (Tonalite-Trondhjemite-Granodiorite). On the Earth, TTG was common in the terrestrial continental crust in the Archean era (more than 2.5 billion years ago). By landing in Gale crater, Curiosity was able to sample a variety of rocks because the crater dug deep into the crust, thus exposing old rocks, some of which may be about 3.6 billion years old. For many years, Mars was thought to be composed of the dark, igneous rock basalt, so this is a significant discovery.

On October 8, 2015, a large team of scientists confirmed the existence of long-lasting lakes in Gale Crater. The conclusion of Gale having lakes was based on evidence of old streams with coarser gravel in addition to places where streams appear to have emptied out into bodies of standing water. If lakes were once present, Curiosity would start seeing water-deposited, fine-grained rocks closer to Mount Sharp. That is exactly what happened.

Finely laminated mudstones were discovered by Curiosity; this lamination represents the settling of plumes of fine sediment through a standing body of water. Sediment deposited in a lake formed the lower portion of Mount Sharp, the mountain in Gale crater.

At a press conference in San Francisco at the American Geophysical Union meeting, a group of scientists told of a discovery of very high concentrations of silica at some sites, along with the first ever discovery of a silica mineral called tridymite. The scientific team believes that water was involved with putting the silica in place. Acidic water would tend transport other ingredients away and leave silica behind, whereas alkaline or neutral water could carry in dissolved silica that would be deposited. This finding used measurements from ChemCam, the Alpha Particle X-ray Spectrometer (APXS), and the Chemistry and Mineralogy (CheMin) instrument inside the rover. Tridymite was found in a rock named "Buckskin". ChemCam and APXS measurements displayed high silica in pale zones along fractures in the bedrock beyond Marias Pass; hence silica may have been deposited by fluids that flowed through the fractures. CheMin found high silica levels in drilled material from a target called "Big Sky" and in another rock called "Greenhorn".

As of the beginning of 2016, Curiosity had discovered seven hydrous minerals. The minerals are actinolite, montmorillonite, saponite, jarosite, halloysite, szomolnokite and magnesite. In some places the total concentration of all hydrous minerals was 40 vol%. Hydrous minerals help us understand the early water environment and possible biology on Mars.

By using Curiosity's laser-firing device (ChemCam), scientists found manganese oxides in mineral veins in the "Kimberley" region of Gale Crater. These minerals need lots of water and oxidizing conditions to form; hence this discovery points to a water-rich, oxygen-rich past.

A study of the kinds of minerals in veins examined with Curiosity found that evaporating lakes were present in the past in Gale crater. The Sheepbed Member mudstones of Yellowknife Bay (YKB) were examined in this research.

Frost probably has formed in three locations in the first 1000 sols of the mission of the Curiosity exploration according to research published in Icarus in 2016. This frost can cause weathering. Frost formation can explain the widespread detection of hydrated materials from orbit with the OMEGA instrument; it also can explain the hydrated component measured by Curiosity in Martian soil.

Researchers in December 2016 announced the discovery of the element boron on Mars by Curiosity in mineral veins. For boron to be present there must have been a temperature between 0–60 degrees Celsius and a neutral-to-alkaline pH." The temperature, pH, and dissolved minerals of the groundwater support a habitable environment. Moreover, boron has been suggested to be necessary for life to form. Its presence stabilizes the sugar ribose which is an ingredient in RNA. Details of the discovery of Boron on Mars were given in a paper written by a large number of researchers and published in Geophysical Research Letters.

Researchers have concluded that Gale Crater has experienced many episodes of groundwater with changes in the groundwater chemistry. These chemical changes would support life.

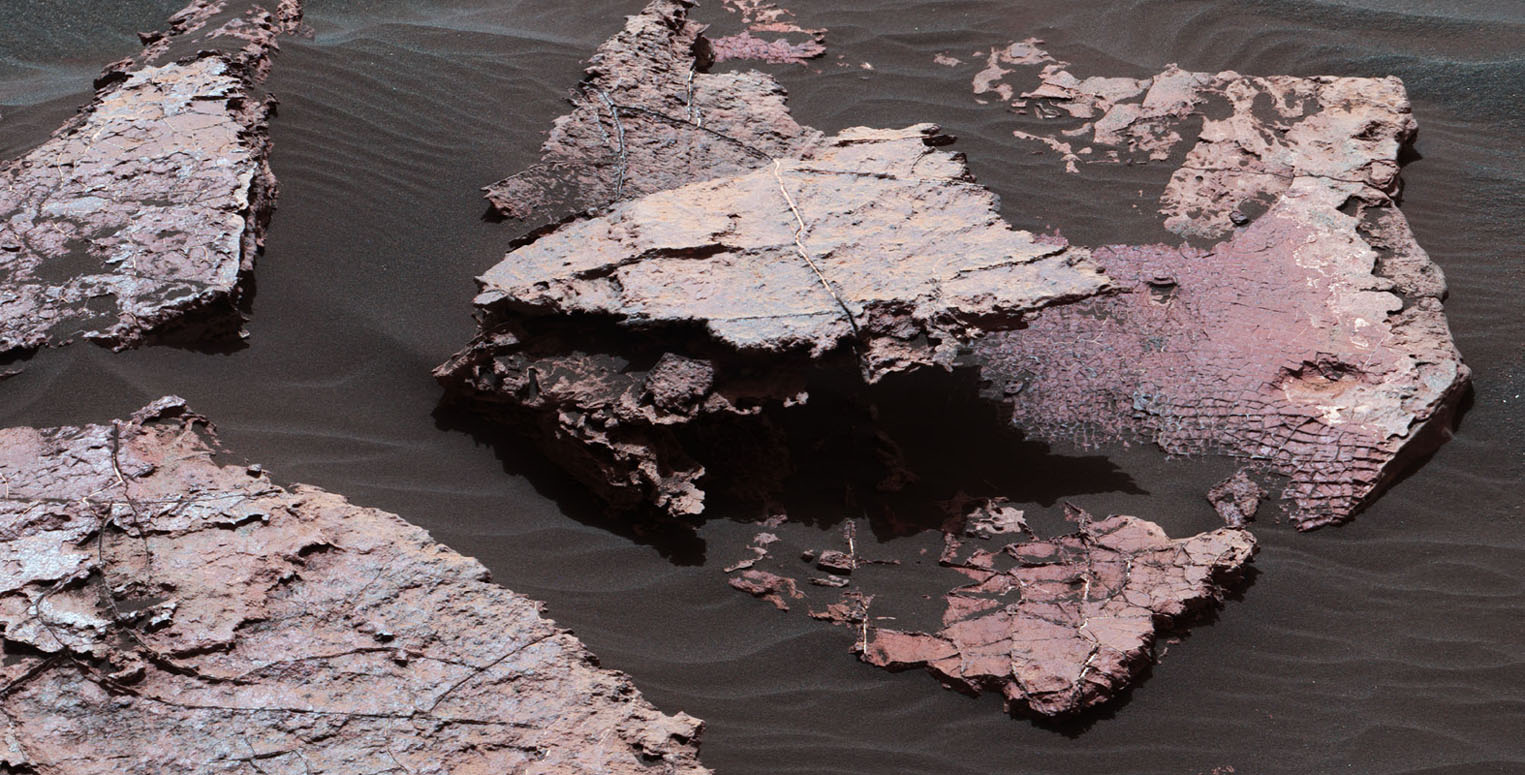
Probable mud cracks appearing as ridges, as seen by Curiosity rover

In January 2017, JPL scientists announced the discovery of mud cracks on Mars. This find adds more evidence that Gale Crater was wet in the past.

Studies of the wind around the Curiosity rover over a period of 3 billion years has shown that the Mount Sharp, the mound inside Gale Crater was created when winds removed material over billions of years and left material in the middle that is Mount Sharp. The researchers calculated that about 15,000 cubic miles (64,000 cubic kilometers) of material was removed from the crater. Curiosity has seen dust devils in action in the distance. Also, changes were visible as a dust devil passed close to the rover. Ripples in the sand below Curiosity were observed to move about one inch (2.5 cm) in just one day.

CheMin found feldspar, mafic igneous minerals, iron oxides, crystalline silica, phyllosilicates, sulfate minerals in mudstone of Gale Crater. Some of the trends in these minerals at different levels suggested that at least part of the time the lake had near-neutral pH.

An analysis of a large amount of data from ChemCam and APXS showed that most of the material encountered by Curiosity consists of just two major igneous rock types and traces of three others. One chief type is classified as a subalkaline, Mg-rich basalt (similar to MER Spirit basalt) and the other was a more evolved, higher Si, Al, lower Mg basalt.

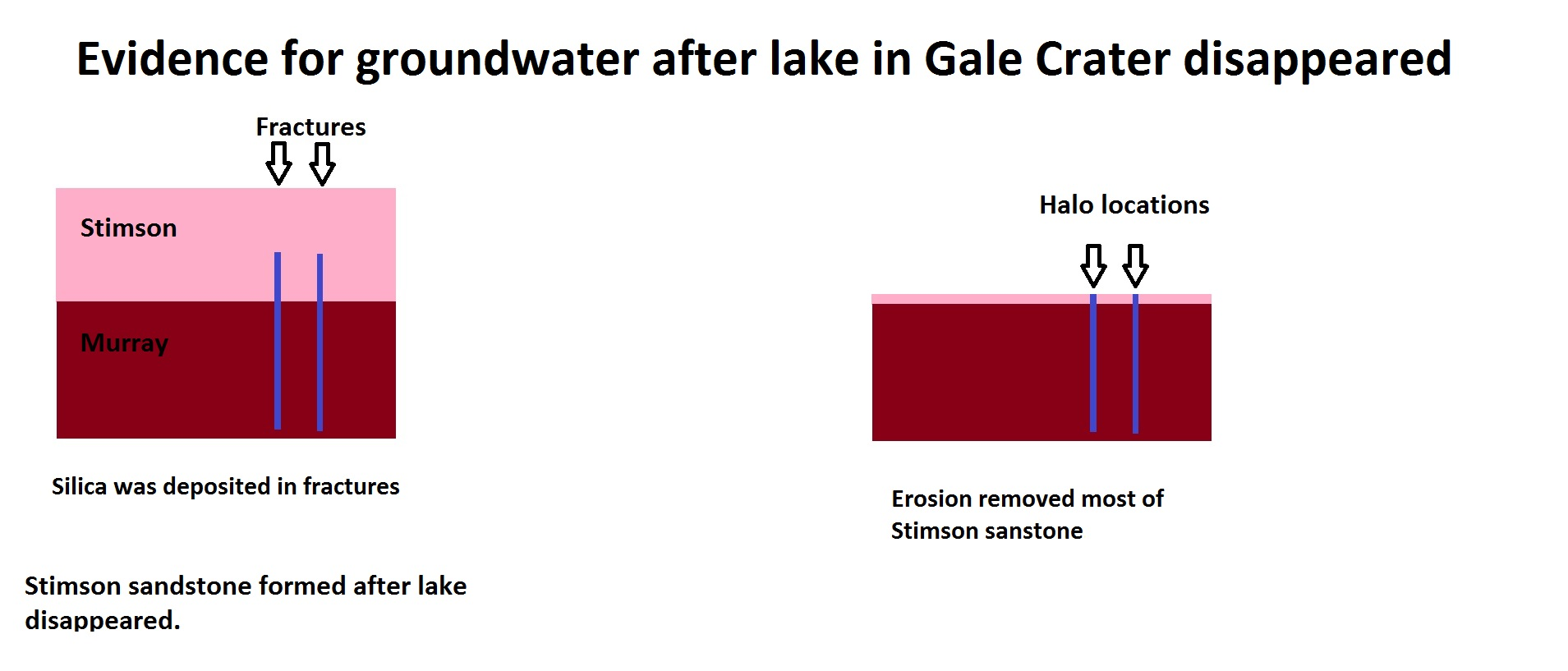
Fractures that went through both Murray mudstone and Stimson sandstone layers had silica deposited in them (shown in left drawing). After erosion removed most of Stimson layer, halos were found around the fractures by the Curiosity rover. Because the Stimson was formed after the lake disappeared, water must have been in the ground for a long time after the lake dried up.

A large group of researchers discovered halos around fractures that they water existed in the ground long after water disappeared from Gale crater. Groundwater, carrying dissolved silica, moved in fractures and deposited silica there. This silica enrichment went across young and old rocks.

Research of chemicals in layers in Gale Crater, published in 2017, suggest that the lake in Gale Crater had a neutral pH for much of the time. The mudstone in the Murray formation at the base of Mount Sharp indicated deposition in a lake environment. After the layers were deposited, an acid solution may have moved through the rock, which contained olivine and pyroxene, dissolving some minerals like magnetite and forming new ones like hematite and jarosite. The elements magnesium (Mg), iron (Fe), manganese (Mn), nickel (Ni), and zinc (Zn) were carried down. Eventually, Ni, Zn, and Mn coated (adsorbed onto) clay particles. Iron-oxides, Mg, and sulfur produced sulfates. The Murray formation was sampled at several locations for this research: Confidence Hills, Mojave 2, Telegraph peak, and Buckskin.

Research presented in a June 2018 press conference described the detection of more organic molecules in a drill sample analyzed by Curiosity. Some of the organic molecules found were thiophenes, benzene, toluene, and small carbon chains, such as propane or butane. At least 50 nanomoles of organic carbon are still in the sample, but were not specifically determined. The remaining organic material probably exists as macromolecules organic sulfur molecules. Organic matter was from lacustrine mudstones at the base of the ~3.5-billion-year-old Murray formation at Pahrump Hills, by the Sample Analysis at Mars instrument suite.

With two full Martian years (five Earth years) of measurements, scientists found that the annual average concentration of methane in Mars' atmosphere is 0.41 ppb. However, methane levels rise and fall with the seasons, going from 0.24 ppb in winter to 0.65 ppb in summer. The researchers also saw relatively large methane spikes, up to about 7 ppb, at random intervals. The existence of methane in the Martian atmosphere is exciting because on Earth, most methane is produced by living organisms. Methane on Mars does not prove that life exists there, but it is consistent with life. Ultraviolet radiation from the sun destroys methane does not last long; consequently, something must have been creating or releasing it.

Using date gathered with Mastcam, a team of researchers have found what they believe to be iron meteorites. These meteorites stand out in multispectral observations as not possessing the usual ferrous or ferric absorption features as the surrounding surface.

Emily Lakdaealla wrote a detailed 2018 book about the Curiosity rover's instruments and history. She listed the minerals that Curiosity's CheMin has discovered. CheMin has discovered olivine, pyroxene, feldspar, quartz, magnetite, iron sulfides (pyrite and pyrrhotite), akaganeite, jarosite, and calcium sulfates (gypsum, anhydrite, basanite)

Research presented in 2018 at the Geological Society of America Annual Meeting in Indianapolis, Indiana described evidence for huge floods in Gale Crater. One rock unit examined by Curiosity contains the rock conglomerate with particles up to 20 centimeters across. To create such a type of rock water must have been 10 to 20 meters in depth. Between two million years to 12,000 years ago, Earth experienced these types of floods.

Using various gravity measurements, a team of scientists concluded that Mount Sharp may have formed right where it is, as it is. The authors stated, "Mount Sharp formed largely in its current form as a free-standing mound within Gale." One idea was that it was part of material that covered a wide region and then eroded, leaving Mount Sharp. However, if that were the case, the layers on the bottom would be fairly dense. This gravity data show that the bottom layers are quite porous. Had they been under many layers of rock they would be compressed and be more dense. Intensity of the gravity was obtained by using data from Curiosity's accelerometers.

Researched published in Nature Geoscience in October 2019 described how Gale crater underwent many wet and dry cycles as its lake waters disappeared. Sulfate salts from evaporated water showed that pools of salty water once existed in Gale Crater. These ponds could have supported organisms. Basalts could have produced the calcium and magnesium sulfates that were found. Because of its low solubility, calcium sulfate is deposited early on as a lake dries up. However, the discovery of magnesium sulfate salts means that the lake must have almost totally evaporated. The remaining pools of water would have been very salty—such lakes on Earth contain organisms that are salt tolerant or "halotolerant". These minerals were found along the edges of what were lakes in the younger parts of Gale Crater. When Curiosity was exploring deeper in the crater, clays found there showed that a lake existed for a long time, these new findings of sulfates the lake dried up and then get wetter over and over.

Sulfate salts have been detected in other places in Gale as white veins caused by groundwater moving through cracks in the rocks.

Curiosity has found oxygen going into the air in Gale Crater. Measurements over three Martian years (almost six Earth years) by an instrument in the Sample Analysis at Mars (SAM) portable chemistry lab revealed that the level of oxygen went up throughout spring and summer by as much as 30%, and then dropped back to normal levels by fall. Each spring this occurred. These oxygen seasonal variations suggest some unknown process in the atmosphere or the surface is occurring.

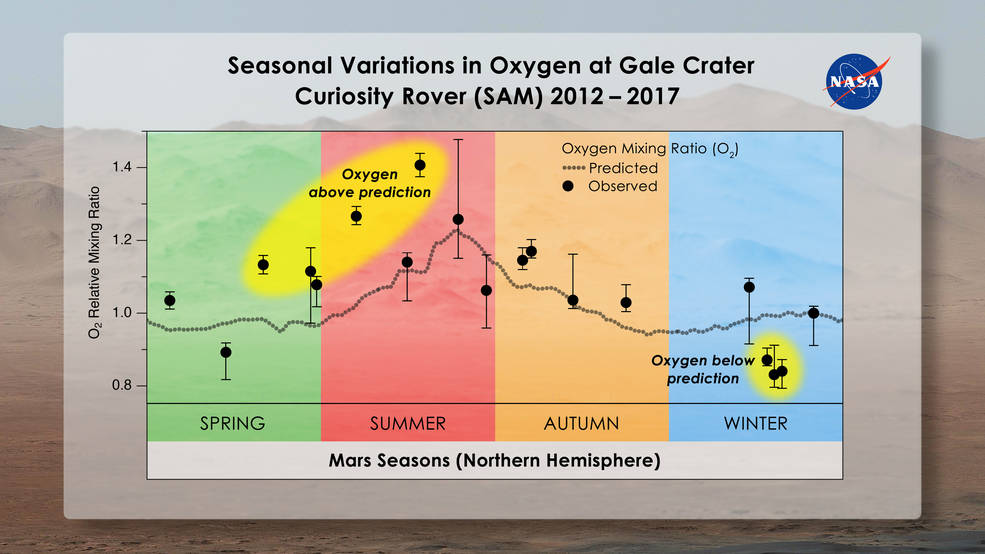
Mars seasonal oxygen Gale Crater

Evidence of life on Mars was published on January 19, 2022. Rover's Tunable Laser Spectrometer (TLS) determined the abundance of carbon isotopes in 24 samples. In many of the samples the relative amount of carbon-12 compared to carbon-13 suggested organisms altered the isotopes.

In July 2024 the Rover cracked open a rock with its wheel and found crystals of sulfur. Minerals containing sulfur were discovered, but never the pure element. It was found in Gediz Vallis.

Eventuality, Curiosity Rover found some iron carbonates. CheMin measurements of rocks found crystalline siderite (FeCO_{3}). One rock contained over 10 % of the mineral. The rocks also were composed of plagioclase with the elements sodium (Na)–, Ca-, and aluminum (Al)–, as well as Ca- and Mg-bearing silicate mineral pyroxene. Other minerals found were calcium sulfates, magnesium sulfates, different amounts of iron oxyhydroxides, and an unidentified x-ray amorphous material. Rover's Chemistry and Mineralogy (CheMin) instrument uses x-ray diffraction to determine sample mineralogy. The names of the rock formations and drill sites are CA, Canaima; TC, Tapo Caparo; UB, Ubajara; and SQ, Sequoia. V

A research team analyzed microscopic iron oxide crystals in rocks examined by the Curiosity rover by comparing the crystallographic properties with laboratory experiments. They found that shape of the crystals indicates the formation mechanism. The authors argue that a measured transition in the crystal properties coincides with the ancient climate change. The rover's Chemistry and Minerology (CheMin) instrument was used in the study. The mineral, hematite, showed different crystallite sizes at different elevations, being less than 10 nanometers in size at higher elevations but reaching up to 65 nanometers at lower ones. The larger sizes further down may have been a result of a process known as Ostwald ripening, where smaller crystals dissolve and contribute to the growth of larger ones. Despite Mars's climate becoming colder, conditions in buried rocks were warm and wet conditions were present for extended periods, potentially maintaining habitable conditions.

== Inverted relief ==
Some places on Mars show inverted relief. In these locations, a stream bed may be a raised feature, instead of a valley. The inverted former stream channels may be caused by the deposition of large rocks or due to cementation. In either case erosion would erode the surrounding land but leave the old channel as a raised ridge because the ridge will be more resistant to erosion.

== Fretted terrain ==
Parts of the Aeolis quadrangle contain fretted terrain which is characterized by cliffs, mesas, buttes, and straight-walled canyons. It contains scarps or cliffs that are 1 to 2 km in height.

== Layered terrain ==
Researchers, writing in Icarus, have described layered units in the Aeolis quadrangle at Aeolis Dorsa. A deposit that contains yardang was formed after several other deposits. The yardangs contain a layered deposit called "rhythmite" which was thought to be formed with regular changes in the climate. Because the layers appear harden, a damp or wet environment probably existed at the time. The authors correlate these layered deposits to the upper layers of Gale crater's mound (Mt. Sharp).

Many places on Mars show rocks arranged in layers. Sometimes the layers are of different colors. Light-toned rocks on Mars have been associated with hydrated minerals like sulfates. The Mars rover Opportunity examined such layers close-up with several instruments. Some layers are probably made up of fine particles because they seem to break up into find dust. Other layers break up into large boulders so they are probably much harder. Basalt, a volcanic rock, is thought to in the layers that form boulders. Basalt has been identified on Mars in many places. Instruments on orbiting spacecraft have detected clay (also called phyllosilicate) in some layers. Recent research with an orbiting near-infrared spectrometer, which reveals the types of minerals present based on the wavelengths of light they absorb, found evidence of layers of both clay and sulfates in Columbus crater. This is exactly what would appear if a large lake had slowly evaporated. Moreover, because some layers contained gypsum, a sulfate which forms in relatively fresh water, life could have formed in the crater.

Scientists were excited about finding hydrated minerals such as sulfates and clays on Mars because they are usually formed in the presence of water. Litght-toned materials on Mars often contain these minerals. Places that contain clays and/or other hydrated minerals would be good places to look for evidence of life.

Rock can form layers in a variety of ways. Volcanoes, wind, or water can produce layers. Layers can be hardened by the action of groundwater. Martian ground water probably moved hundreds of kilometers, and in the process it dissolved many minerals from the rock it passed through. When ground water surfaces in low areas containing sediments, water evaporates in the thin atmosphere and leaves behind minerals as deposits and/or cementing agents. Consequently, layers of dust could not later easily erode away since they were cemented together. On Earth, mineral-rich waters often evaporate forming large deposits of various types of salts and other minerals. Sometimes water flows through Earth's aquifers, and then evaporates at the surface just as is hypothesized for Mars. One location this occurs on Earth is the Great Artesian Basin of Australia. On Earth the hardness of many sedimentary rocks, like sandstone, is largely due to the cement that was put in place as water passed through.

== Linear ridge networks ==
Linear ridge networks are found in various places on Mars in and around craters. Ridges often appear as mostly straight segments. They are hundreds of meters long, tens of meters high, and several meters wide. It is thought that impacts created fractures in the surface, these fractures later acted as channels for fluids. Fluids cemented the structures. With the passage of time, surrounding material was eroded away, thereby leaving hard ridges behind. Since the ridges occur in locations with clay, these formations could serve as a marker for clay which requires water for its formation.

== See also ==
- Adirondack – Boulder on Mars
- Carbonates on Mars
- Climate of Mars
- Composition of Mars – Branch of the geology of Mars
- Equatorial layered deposits – Surface geological deposits on Mars
- Gale (crater)
- Geology of Mars – Geology of fourth planet from the Sun
- Groundwater on Mars – Water held in permeable ground
- Impact crater – Circular depression in a solid astronomical body formed by the impact of a smaller object
- Lakes on Mars – Former bodies of water on Mars
- Scientific information from the Mars Exploration Rover mission
- Timeline of Mars Science Laboratory – Event timeline of the NASA Mars Science Laboratory mission
- Yardangs on Mars – Aeolian formation

MC-01 Mare Boreum (features)
| MC-02 Diacria (features) | | MC-03 Arcadia (features) | MC-04 Acidalium (features) | MC-05 Ismenius Lacus (features) | | MC-06 Casius (features) | MC-07 Cebrenia (features) |
| MC-08 Amazonis (features) | MC-09 Tharsis (features) | MC-10 Lunae Palus (features) | MC-11 Oxia Palus (features) | MC-12 Arabia (features) | MC-13 Syrtis Major (features) | MC-14 Amenthes (features) | MC-15 Elysium (features) |
| MC-16 Memnonia (features) | MC-17 Phoenicis Lacus (features) | MC-18 Coprates (features) | MC-19 Margaritifer Sinus (features) | MC-20 Sinus Sabaeus (features) | MC-21 Iapygia (features) | MC-22 Mare Tyrrhenum (features) | MC-23 Aeolis (features) |
| MC-24 Phaethontis (features) | | MC-25 Thaumasia (features) | MC-26 Argyre (features) | MC-27 Noachis (features) | | MC-28 Hellas (features) | MC-29 Eridania (features) |
MC-30 Mare Australe (features)
