= Aguirre Department =

- Department
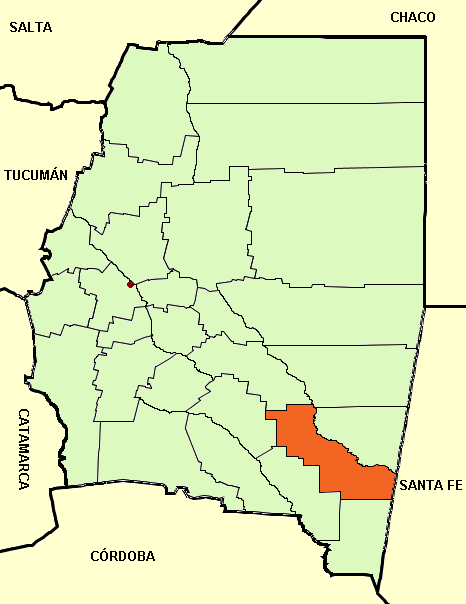
- Location of Aguirre Department within Santiago del Estero Province
- Coordinates (Pinto): 29°8′S 62°39′W
- Country: Argentina
- Province: Santiago del Estero
- Head town: Pinto

Area
  - Total: 3,692 km^{2} (1,425 sq mi)

Population (2010)
  - Total: 7,610
  - Density: 2.06/km^{2} (5.34/sq mi)
- Time zone: UTC-3 (ART)

Aguirre Department is a department of Santiago del Estero Province, Argentina. The capital lies at Pinto.

The department covers an area of 3692 km². The population as of 2010 was 7,610. Municipalities include Argentina, Casares and Malbrán.
