= El Portezuelo =

Coordinates: 28°28′S 65°38′W

- Municipality and village
- Interactive map of El Portezuelo
- Country: Argentina
- Province: Catamarca Province
- Time zone: UTC−3 (ART)

El Portezuelo is a village and municipality in Catamarca Province in northwestern Argentina.

El Portezuelo has 4 neighborhoods: La Quebrada, El Carril, Arturo Illia, and Hermana Jacinta Rodriguez. The bridge on the river Paclín divides La Quebrada from Carril.
