= Los Pirpintos =

Coordinates: 26°08′S 62°05′W

- Municipality and village
- Interactive map of Los Pirpintos
- Country: Argentina
- Province: Santiago del Estero Province
- Time zone: UTC−3 (ART)

Los Pirpintos is a municipality and village in Santiago del Estero Province in Argentina.
