= Malbrán =

- Municipality and village
- Location of Malbrán within Argentina
- Coordinates: 29°20′48″S 62°25′57″W
- Country: Argentina
- Province: Santiago del Estero
- Department: Aguirre
- Time zone: UTC−3 (ART)

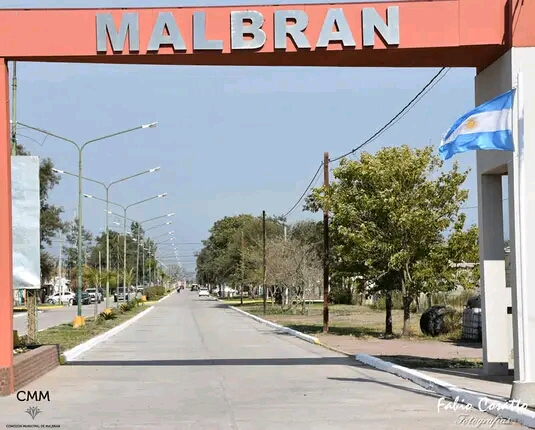
Entrance arch to Malbran

Malbrán is a municipality and village in Santiago del Estero in Argentina.

It is a City Commission (art.209 "Organic Law of Municipalities No.: 5590) is currently the second most populous city department Aguirre (905 hab. Census 2001). Located just 30 km away from the nearby town of Pinto (head of department) which concentrates and commercial banking.
