= Vilelas, Santiago del Estero =

Coordinates: 27°57′S 62°38′W

Vilelas
- Municipality and village
- Interactive map of Vilelas
- Country: Argentina
- Province: Santiago del Estero Province
- Time zone: UTC−3 (ART)

Vilelas is a municipality and village in Santiago del Estero Province in Argentina.
