= Pinto, Santiago del Estero =

Coordinates: 29°09′S 62°39′W

Pinto (Santiago del Estero)
- Municipality and village
- Interactive map of Pinto (Santiago del Estero)
- Country: Argentina
- Province: Santiago del Estero Province
- Department: Aguirre Department
- Time zone: UTC−3 (ART)
- Climate: Cfa

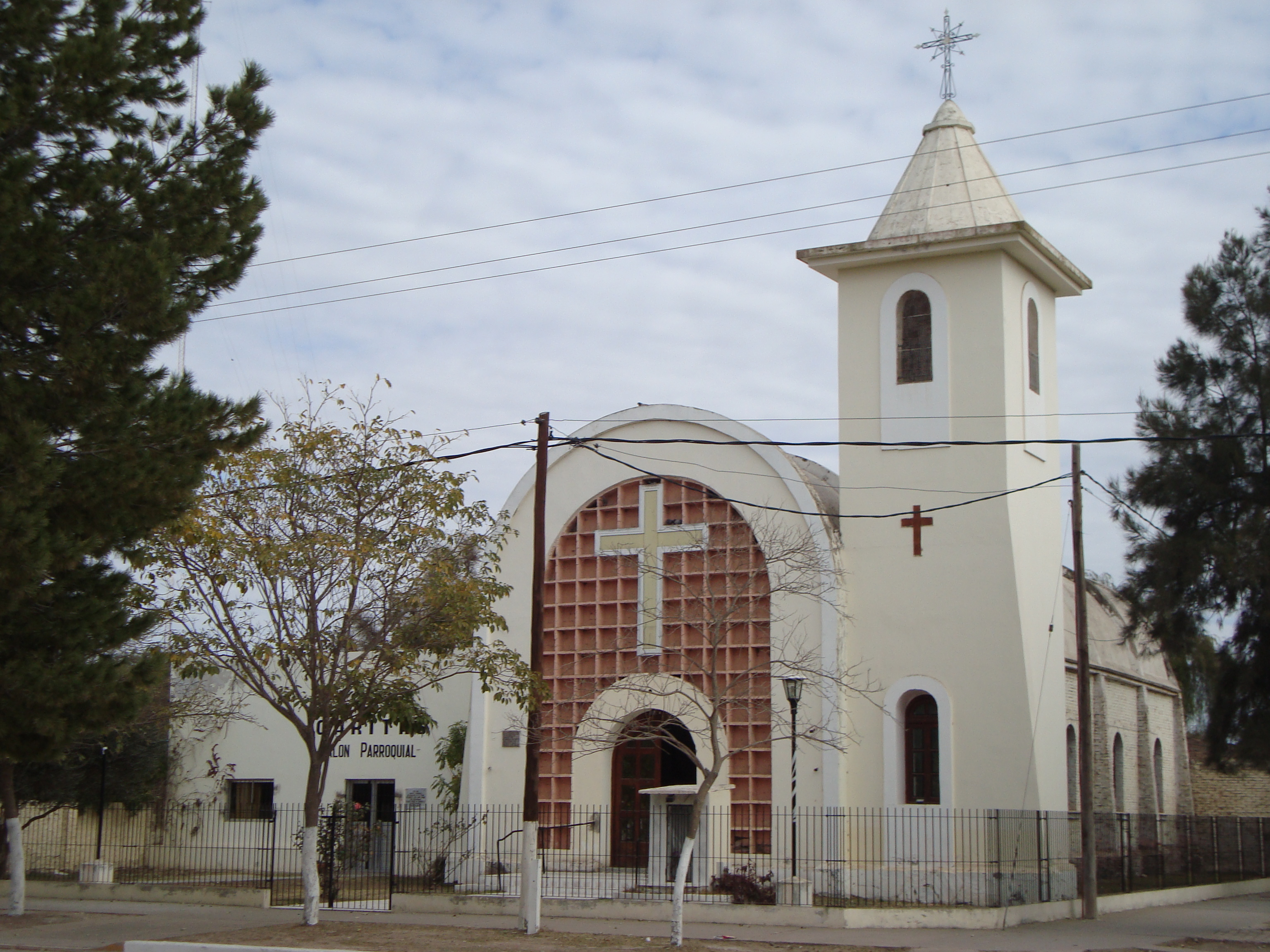
Pinto, Santiago del Estero

Pinto (Santiago del Estero) is a municipality and village in Santiago del Estero in Argentina.
