= Tintina (rock) =

Rock on the surface of Mars

Tintina Rock
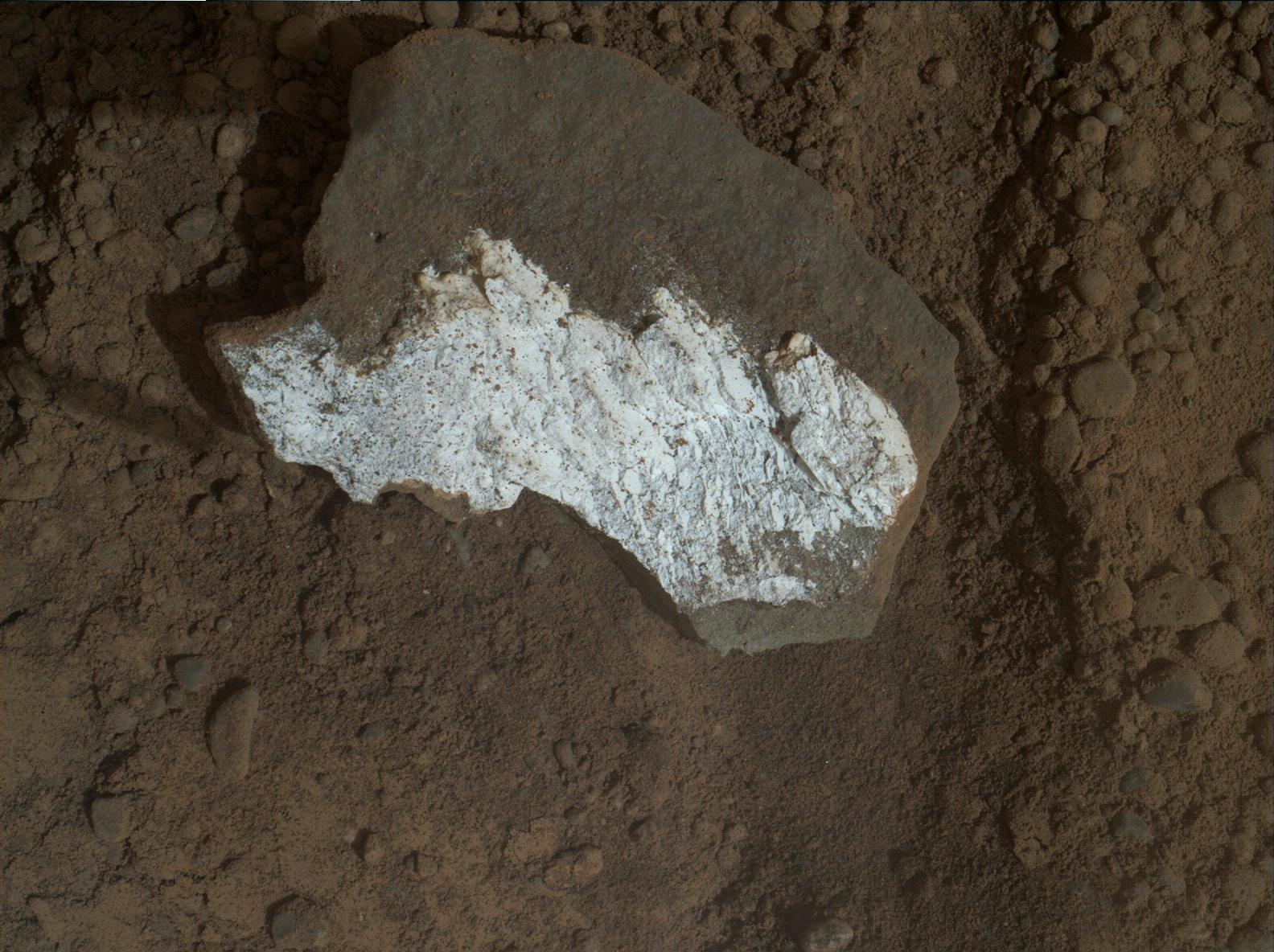
- Close-up of "Tintina" rock – broken exposed area is associated with strong signals of mineral hydration – as viewed by the Curiosity rover (January 19, 2013).
- Feature type: Rock
- Coordinates: 4.59°S 137.44°E

Tintina is a rock on the surface of Aeolis Palus, between Peace Vallis and Aeolis Mons (Mount Sharp), in Gale crater on the planet Mars. The approximate site coordinates are: 4.59°S 137.44°E.

The rock was encountered by the Curiosity rover on the way from Bradbury Landing to Glenelg Intrigue in January 2013. The rover ran over the rock and broke it. revealing white surface area in the rock. This was the brightest material yet seen by MastCam up to that time.

When the broken white area was analyzed with the rover's MastCam, strong signals of mineral hydration, as indicated by a ratio of near infrared reflectance intensities, were found. According to mission scientists, the mineral hydration signals were consistent with hydrated calcium sulfate, and a watery past on Mars.

Tintina Rock on Mars

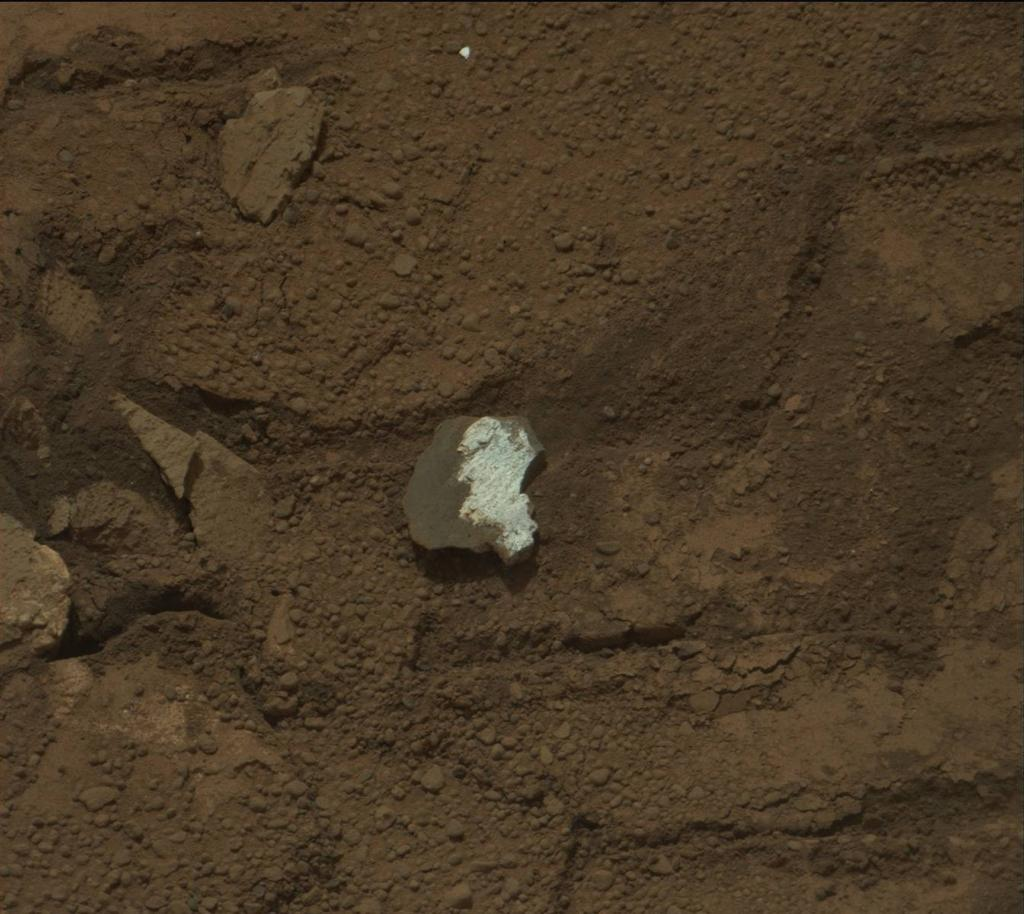
Broken area – Context View.

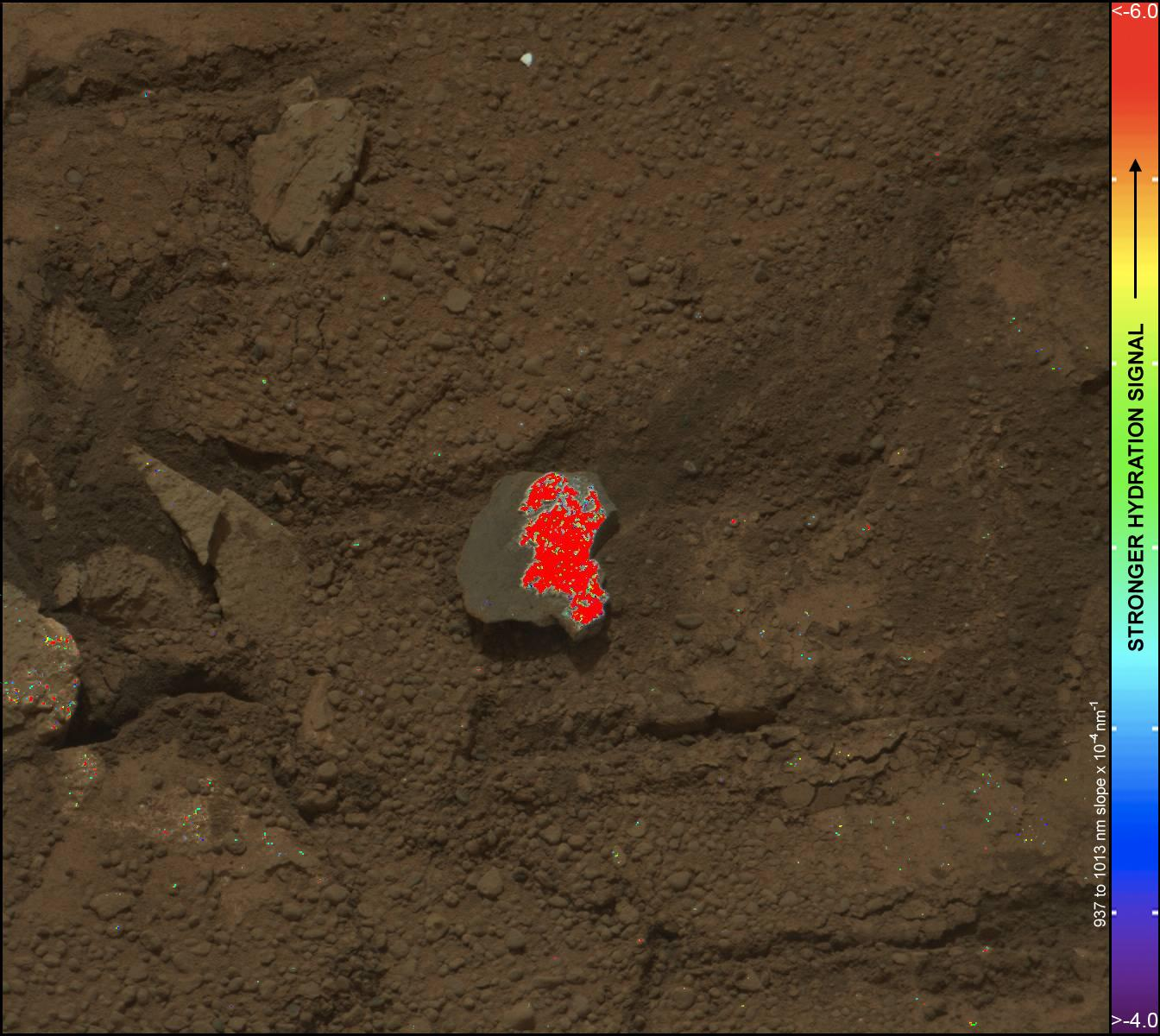
Broken area shows strong signals of mineral hydration (noted in red)

Viewed by the Curiosity Rover (January 19, 2013).

== See also ==
- Aeolis quadrangle
- Composition of Mars
- Geology of Mars
- List of rocks on Mars
- Timeline of Mars Science Laboratory
