= Pipo Mancera =

Spanish presenter (1942–2023)

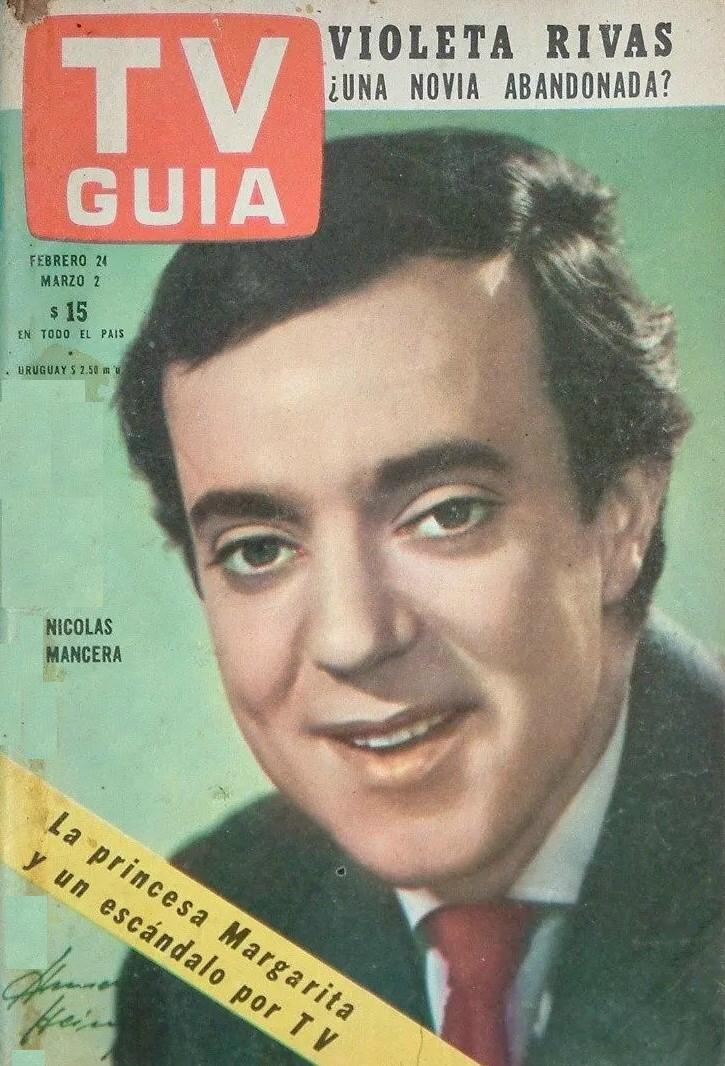
- Mancera in 1965
- Born: 20 December 1930; Buenos Aires, Argentina
- Died: 29 August 2011 (aged 80); Buenos Aires, Argentina
- Occupation: Presenter

José Nicolás "Pipo" Mancera (20 December 1930 – 29 August 2011) was an Argentine radio and television presenter and journalist. He has been described as "a television pioneer" and "a legend of Argentine television".

== Life and career ==
Born in Buenos Aires, Mancera started his career in the early 1960s as a film journalist. He had his breakout thanks to Sábados Circulares, a six hours long program he created and hosted between 1962 and 1974. In the show, he interviewed numerous international stars, including Sophia Loren, Pelé, Alain Delon, Marcello Mastroianni and Diego Maradona. He is regarded as an innovator, having introduced several new elements to Argentine television, such as hidden cameras, lie-detector segments, and animated–live action interaction. He was also active as a columnist for the newspaper La Razón, and appeared in several films.

During his career, Mancera received several awards and honours, notably a Lifetime Martín Fierro Award and a Silver Condor Award for his career. He died of cardiac arrest on 29 August 2011, at the age of 80.
