= Sacháyoj =

Coordinates: 26°41′S 61°50′W

- Municipality and village
- Interactive map of Sacháyoj
- Country: Argentina
- Province: Santiago del Estero
- Time zone: UTC−3 (ART)

Sacháyoj is a municipality and village in Santiago del Estero in Argentina.
