= Tintina =

Coordinates: 27°02′S 62°43′W

- Municipality and village
- Interactive map of Tintina
- Country: Argentina
- Province: Santiago del Estero
- Time zone: UTC−3 (ART)

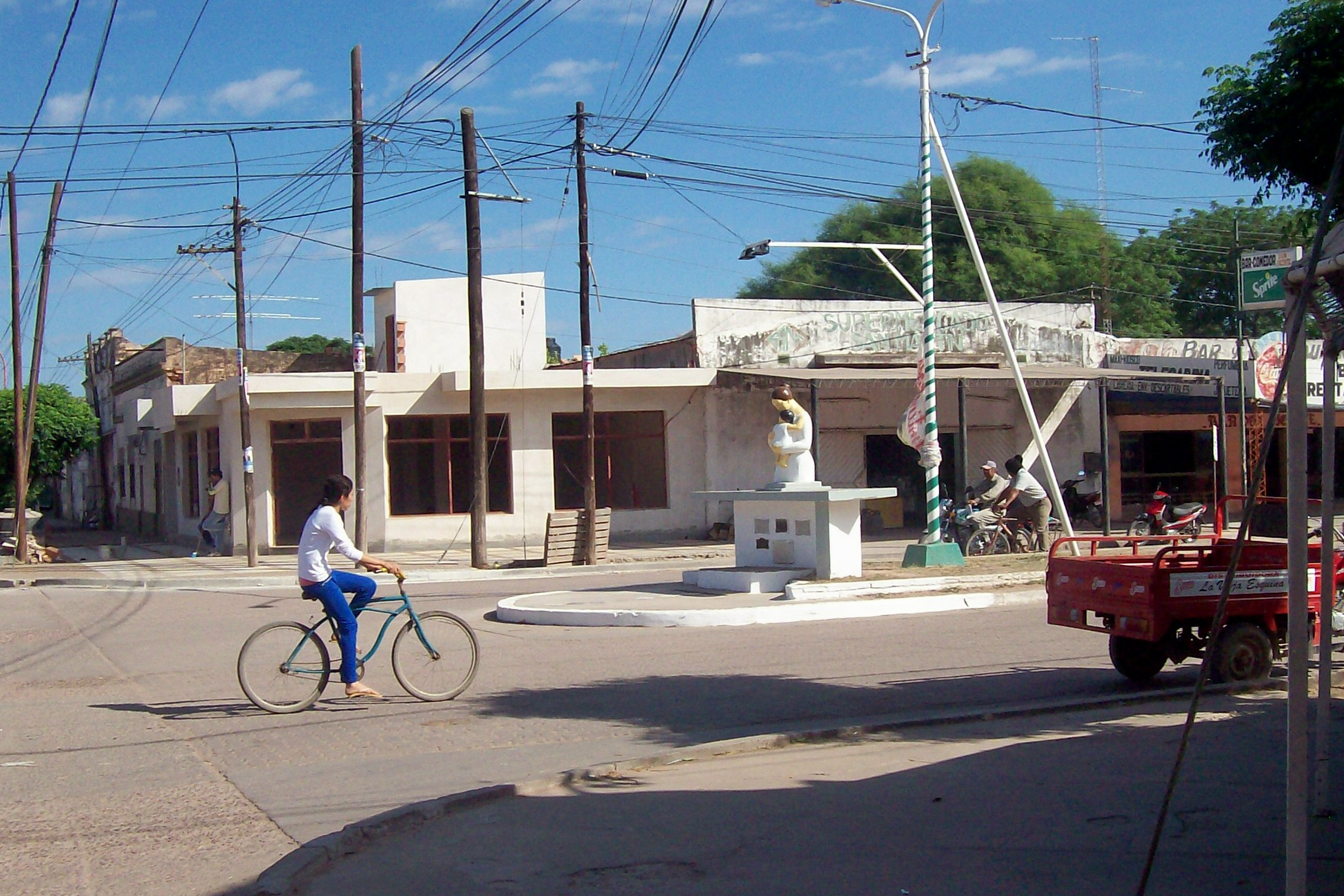
Tintina

Tintina is a municipality and village in Santiago del Estero in Argentina.
