= Graneros, Tucumán =

Coordinates: 27°39′S 65°27′W

Graneros (Tucumán)
- Interactive map of Graneros (Tucumán)
- Country: Argentina
- Province: Tucumán Province

Government
  - Type: Municipality
  - Intendant: Raquel Alejandra Graneros (PJ)
- Time zone: UTC−3 (ART)

Graneros (Tucumán) is a settlement in Tucumán Province in northern Argentina.
