= List of weather records =

In recent decades, new high temperature records have substantially outpaced new low temperature records on a growing portion of Earth's surface. Comparison shows seasonal variability for record increases.

The list of weather records includes the most extreme occurrences of weather phenomena for various categories. Many weather records are measured under specific conditions—such as surface temperature and wind speed—to keep consistency among measurements around the Earth. Each of these records is understood to be the record value officially observed, as these records may have been exceeded before modern weather instrumentation was invented, or in remote areas without an official weather station. This list does not include remotely sensed observations such as satellite measurements, since those values are not considered official records.

== Temperature ==
Increasingly, record temperatures have been warm record temperatures.

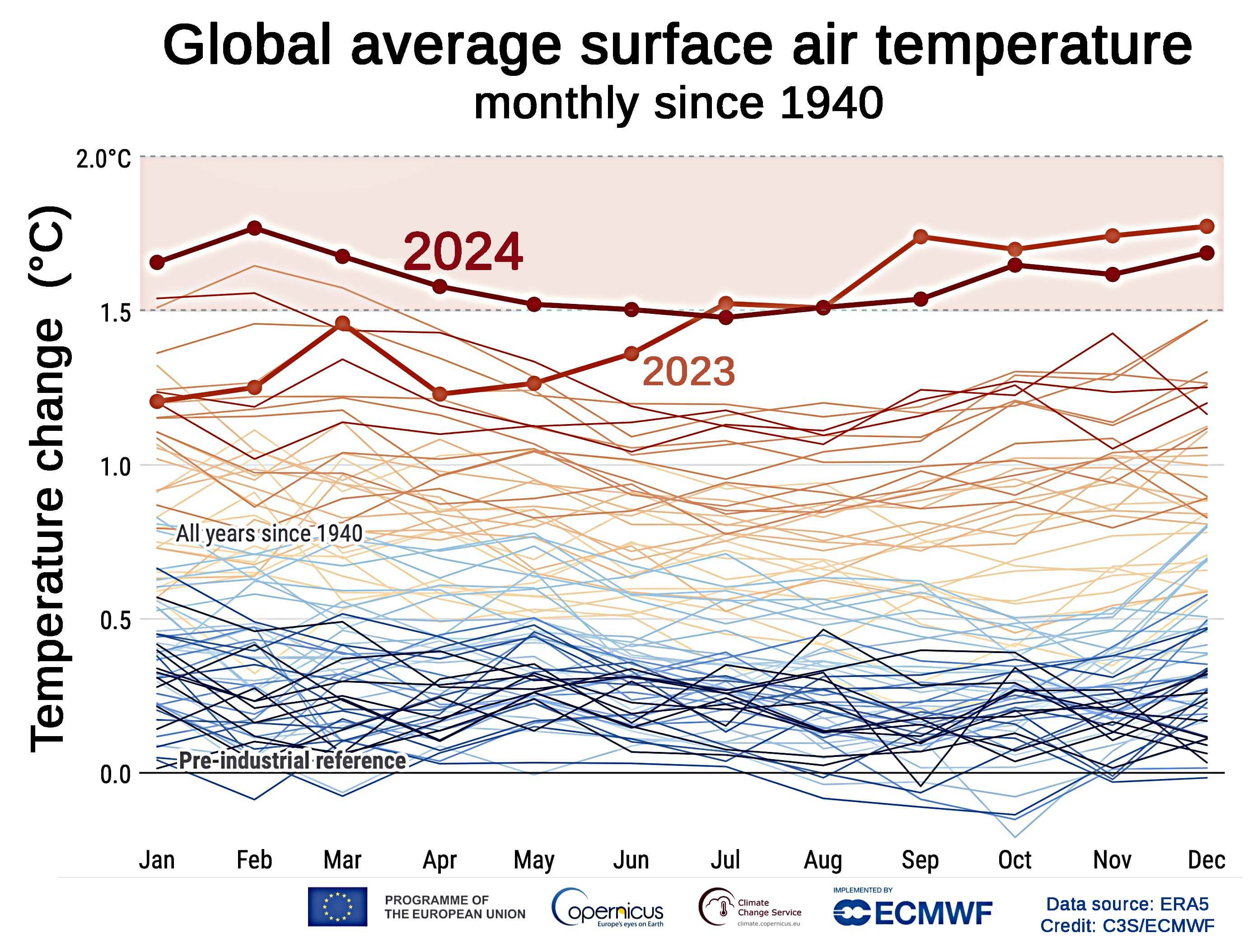
2024 saw the highest global average surface temperature in recorded history.

=== Measuring conditions ===
The standard measuring conditions for temperature are in the air, 1.25 metres (4.1 ft) to 2.00 metres (6.6 ft) above the ground, and shielded from direct sunlight intensity (hence the term x degrees "in the shade"). The following lists include all officially confirmed claims measured by those methods.

Temperatures measured directly on the ground may exceed air temperatures by 30 to 50 °C (54 to 90 °F). The highest natural ground surface temperature ever recorded may have been an alleged reading of 93.9 °C (201.0 °F) at Furnace Creek, California, United States, on 15 July 1972. In 2011, a ground temperature of 84 °C (183.2 °F) was recorded in Port Sudan, Sudan. The theoretical maximum possible ground surface temperature has been estimated to be between 90 and 100 °C (194 and 212 °F) for dry, darkish soils of low thermal conductivity.

Satellite measurements of ground temperature taken between 2003 and 2009, taken with the MODIS infrared spectroradiometer on the Aqua satellite, found a maximum temperature of 70.7 °C (159.3 °F), which was recorded in 2005 in the Lut Desert, Iran. The Lut Desert was also found to have the highest maximum temperature in five of the seven years measured (2004, 2005, 2006, 2007 and 2009). These measurements reflect averages over a large region and so are lower than the maximum point surface temperature.

Satellite measurements of the surface temperature of Antarctica, taken between 1982 and 2013, found a coldest temperature of −93.2 °C (−135.8 °F) on 10 August 2010, at 81.8°S 59.3°E. Although this is not comparable to an air temperature, it is believed that the air temperature at this location would have been lower than the official record lowest air temperature of −89.2 °C (−128.6 °F).

=== Hottest ===
==== Highest temperatures ever recorded ====
A world map showing areas with Köppen B classification (dry climates). The temperatures of the hot variants (BWh, BSh) of these climates have the potential to exceed 50 °C (122 °F) during the hottest seasons.

According to the World Meteorological Organization (WMO), the highest temperature ever recorded globally is 56.7 °C (134.1 °F) on 10 July 1913 in Furnace Creek (Greenland Ranch), California, but the validity of this record is challenged as possible problems with the reading have since been discovered. Christopher C. Burt, a weather historian writing for Weather Underground, believes that the 1913 Death Valley reading is "a myth", and is at least 2.2 or 2.8 °C (4 or 5 °F) too high. Burt proposes that the highest reliably recorded temperature on Earth could still be at Death Valley, but is instead 54.0 °C (129.2 °F) recorded on 30 June 2013. This is lower than a 1931 measurement of 55 °C (131 °F) recorded in Kebili, Tunisia, which has been verified by the WMO, although it has been disputed by most meteorologists. The temperature of 54 °C (129 °F) is also matched by a 1942 record from Tirat Zvi, Israel. In 2016 and 2017, readings in Kuwait and Iran also matched the 2013 Death Valley record, while readings in 2020 and 2021 also at Furnace Creek went even higher, up to 54.4 °C (130 °F), however, they have not yet been validated by WMO. The WMO has stated they stand by the 1913 record pending any future investigations.

The former highest official temperature on Earth, 58.0 °C (136.4 °F), measured in ʽAziziya, Libya on 13 September 1922, was reassessed in July 2012 by the WMO which published a report that invalidated the record. Another record hottest temperature was reportedly reached during a severe heat burst that occurred in Kopperl, Texas on 15 June 1960. Also nicknamed "Satan's Storm", the temperature is reported to have increased to around 60 °C (140 °F) in a matter of minutes during the decay phase of a thunderstorm. This event, however, is poorly known and is not commonly included on lists of the highest globally recorded temperatures. There have been other unconfirmed reports of high temperatures, but these temperatures have never been officially validated by national weather services/WMO, and are currently considered to have been recorder's errors, thus not being recognised as world records.

==== Highest global average temperature ====
The warmest day on record for the entire planet was 22 July 2024 when the highest global average temperature was recorded at 17.16 °C (62.89 °F). The previous record was 17.09 °C (62.76 °F) set the day before on 21 July 2024. The month of July 2023 was the hottest month on record globally. September 2023 was the most anomalously warm month, averaging 1.75 °C (3.15 °F) above the preindustrial average for September. The Copernicus Programme (begun 1940) had recorded 13 August 2016, as the hottest global temperature, but by July 2024, that date had been downgraded to the fourth hottest.

The World Meteorological Organization (WMO) stated in its State of the Global Climate 2025 report that the period from 2015 to 2025 represented the warmest eleven-year span since global temperature records began. The report also indicated that 2025 ranked among the two or three hottest individual years on record globally, with the global mean temperature estimated at 1.43 °C (2.57 °F) above the 1850-1900 preindustrial baseline.

Country/Region	Temperature	Town/Location	Date
Africa
Algeria	51.3 °C (124.3 °F)	Ouargla, Ouargla Province	5 July 2018
Botswana	43.8 °C (110.8 °F)	Maun	7 January 2016
Burkina Faso	47.5 °C (117.5 °F)	Dori	13 April 2016
Cape Verde	37.3 °C (99.1 °F)	Praia	2004
Chad	48.0 °C (118.4 °F)	Faya-Largeau	25 May 2023
Ceuta	40.8 °C (105.4 °F)	Ceuta	19 July 2023
Comoros	36.2 °C (97.2 °F)	Hahaya International Airport	12 March 2024
Egypt	50.9 °C (123.6 °F)	Aswan	7 June 2024
Eswatini (Swaziland)	47.4 °C (117.3 °F)	Lavumisa	?
Ethiopia	48.9 °C (120.0 °F)	Dallol, Afar	1966
Gabon	37.5 °C (99.5 °F)	Tchibanga	2008
Gambia	46.8 °C (116.2 °F)	Jenoi; Kuntaur	14 April 2000; May 2002
Ghana	44.6 °C (112.3 °F)	Navrongo	1 May 2024
Guinea	45.0 °C (113.0 °F)	Koundara, Boké Region	29 March 2017
Ivory Coast	41.5 °C (106.7 °F)	Odienne	February 1998
Kenya	42.7 °C (108.9 °F)	Wajir	2026
Madagascar	43.6 °C (110.5 °F)	Ejeda, Atsimo-Andrefana	?
Mali	48.5 °C (119.3 °F)	Kayes	3 April 2024
Mayotte	36.4 °C (97.5 °F)	Trevani	14 April 2020
Morocco	50.4 °C (122.7 °F)	Agadir (Inezgane Airport)	11 August 2023
Niger	49.0 °C (120.2 °F)	Bilma	8 June 2016
Nigeria	46.4 °C (115.5 °F)	Yola	2010
Republic of the Congo	39.6 °C (103.3 °F)	Impfondo	13 March 2024
Réunion	37.3 °C (99.1 °F)	St. Paul	21 January 2019
Rwanda	35.4 °C (95.7 °F)	Kigali	2005
Saint Helena, Ascension and Tristan da Cunha	34.9 °C (94.8 °F)	Georgetown	2010
Somaliland	47.8 °C (118.0 °F)	Berbera	2004
South Africa	48.8 °C (119.8 °F)	Vioolsdrif, Northern Cape	3 January 1993
Sudan	49.7 °C (121.5 °F)	Dongola	25 June 2010
Tanzania	39.4 °C (102.9 °F)	Abeid Amani Karume International Airport, Zanzibar City	2007
Togo	44.0 °C (111.2 °F)	Mango	31 March 2024
Tunisia	50.3 °C (122.5 °F)	Kairouan	11 August 2021
Uganda	40.0 °C (104.0 °F)	Kitgum	February 2005
Zambia	43.5 °C (110.3 °F)	Mfuwe, Eastern Province	2011
Antarctica
Antarctica	19.8 °C (67.6 °F)	Signy Research Station, Signy Island	30 January 1982
Asia
Abkhazia	43.0 °C (109.4 °F)	Lata, Abkhazia	?
Afghanistan (then, Islamic Republic of Afghanistan)	49.8 °C (121.6 °F)	Farah	July 1983
Bahrain	47.6 °C (117.7 °F)	Bahrain International Airport	29 May 2026
Bangladesh	45.1 °C (113.2 °F)	Rajshahi	18 May 1972
Bhutan	40.0 °C (104.0 °F)	Phuentsholing	27 August 1997
Brunei	39.2 °C (102.6 °F)	Mukim Sukang	July 2025
Cambodia	42.8 °C (109.0 °F)	Preah Vihear and Svay Leu District	27 April 2024
China	52.2 °C (126.0 °F)	Sanbu Township, Turpan, Xinjiang	16 July 2023
Hong Kong	39.8 °C (103.6 °F)	Sheung Shui	9 August 2026
India	51.0 °C (123.8 °F)	Phalodi, Rajasthan	19 May 2016
Indonesia	40.0 °C (104.0 °F)	Jatiwangi, Java	12 October 2002
Iran	53.7 °C (128.7 °F)	Ahvaz Airport (OIAW)	29 June 2017
Iraq	53.9 °C (129.0 °F)	Basra	22 July 2016
Palestine	51.2 °C (124.2 °F)	Kalya	22 June 1942
Japan	41.8 °C (107.2 °F)	Isesaki, Gunma	5 August 2025
Jordan	51.1 °C (124.0 °F)	Deir Alla	20 August 2010
Kazakhstan	49.1 °C (120.4 °F)	Turkistan	31 July 1983
Kuwait	54.0 °C (129.2 °F)	Mitribah, Al Jahra Governorate	21 July 2016 (Note: According to the World Meteorological Organization, the reported temperature is the highest recorded in Asia with Israel.)
Kyrgyzstan	44.6 °C (112.3 °F)	Jangy-Jer	July 2026
Laos	43.7 °C (110.7 °F)	Tha Ngon	1 May 2024
Lebanon	45.4 °C (113.7 °F)	Houche Al Oumara; Zahle	27 July 2020
Macau	39.0 °C (102.2 °F)	Coloane	22 August 2017
Malaysia	40.1 °C (104.2 °F)	Chuping	9 April 1998
Maldives	35.8 °C (96.4 °F)	Hanimaadhoo	27 February 2025
Mongolia	44.0 °C (111.2 °F)	Khongor, Darkhan-Uul Province	24 July 1999
Myanmar	47.2 °C (117.0 °F)	Myinmu	14 May 2010
Nepal	46.4 °C (115.5 °F)	Ataria	16 June 1995
North Korea	40.5 °C (104.9 °F)	Hoeryong	30 July 1977
Oman	51.6 °C (124.9 °F)	Joba	16 June 2021
Pakistan	53.5 °C (128.3 °F)	Mohenjo-daro; Turbat	26 May 2010; 28 May 2017
Philippines (first recorded under the (United States) Insular Government)	42.2 °C (108.0 °F)	Tuguegarao, Cagayan Valley	12 April 1912; 11 May 1969
Qatar	50.4 °C (122.7 °F)	Doha	14 July 2010
Russia (Asia)	42.7 °C (108.9 °F)	Ust-Kara, Zabaykalsky Krai	27 June 2010
Saudi Arabia	52.0 °C (125.6 °F)	Jeddah	22 June 2010
Singapore	37.0 °C (98.6 °F)	Tengah; Ang Mo Kio	17 April 1983; 13 May 2023
South Korea	42.5 °C (108.5 °F)	Yangsan, South Gyeongsang Province	2 August 2026
Sri Lanka	40.1 °C (104.2 °F)	Vavuniya	10 April 1983
Syria	49.4 °C (120.9 °F)	Al-Hasakah	30 July 2000
Taiwan	41.6 °C (106.9 °F)	Fuyuan	21 August 2022
Tajikistan	47.0 °C (116.6 °F)	Aivadj	1983
Thailand	45.4 °C (113.7 °F)	Tak	15 April 2023
Turkey	50.5 °C (122.9 °F)	Silopi, Şırnak Province	25 July 2025
Turkmenistan (then the Turkmen SSR, Soviet Union)	50.1 °C (122.2 °F)	Repetek Biosphere State Reserve, Karakum Desert	28 July 1983
United Arab Emirates	52.1 °C (125.8 °F)	Sweihan, Al Ain	July 2002
Uzbekistan	49.7 °C (121.5 °F)	Mashikuduk; Uchquduq	29 July 1983; 18 July 2026
Vietnam	44.2 °C (111.6 °F)	Tương Dương Commune, Nghệ An Province	7 May 2023
Europe
Akrotiri and Dhekelia	42.2 °C (108.0 °F)	Ayios Nikolaos, Dhekelia	15 July 2023
Albania	44.0 °C (111.2 °F)	Kuçovë	25 July 2023
Andorra	39.4 °C (102.9 °F)	Borda Vidal	28 June 2019
Armenia	43.7 °C (110.7 °F)	Meghri	1 August 2011
Austria	41.2 °C (106.2 °F)	Bad Deutsch-Altenburg	5 August 2026
Azerbaijan	46.0 °C (114.8 °F)	Julfa and Ordubad	?
Belarus	40.4 °C (104.7 °F)	Pinsk	29 June 2026
Belgium	41.8 °C (107.2 °F)	Begijnendijk, Flemish Brabant (Note: Part of the July 2019 European heat wave)	25 July 2019
Bosnia and Herzegovina	43.1 °C (109.6 °F)	Mostar	24 August 2007
Bulgaria	45.2 °C (113.4 °F)	Sadovo, Plovdiv Province	5 August 1916
Croatia (then the SR Croatia, SFR Yugoslavia)	42.8 °C (109.0 °F)	Ploče	5 August 1981
Cyprus	46.2 °C (115.2 °F)	Athalassa Visitor Centre	4 September 2020
Czech Republic	41.9 °C (107.4 °F)	Doksany	28 June 2026
Denmark	37.0 °C (98.6 °F)	Ødum, Favrskov Municipality Hans Christian Andersen Airport	27 June 2026
Estonia	35.6 °C (96.1 °F)	Võru	11 August 1992
Faroe Islands	26.3 °C (79.3 °F)	Vágar Airport	2003
Finland	37.2 °C (99.0 °F)	Joensuu Airport, Liperi	29 July 2010
France	46.0 °C (114.8 °F)	Vérargues, Hérault	28 June 2019
Germany	41.8 °C (107.2 °F)	Möckern-Drewitz, Saxony-Anhalt	27 June 2026
Greece	48.0 °C (118.4 °F)	Elefsina, Attica	10 July 1977
Guernsey	36.4 °C (97.5 °F)	Guernsey Airport	25 June 2026
Hungary	42.0 °C (107.6 °F)	Szécsény	30 June 2026
Iceland (then the Kingdom of Iceland)	30.5 °C (86.9 °F)	Teigarhorn, Djúpivogur	22 June 1939
Ireland (then part of the United Kingdom)	33.3 °C (91.9 °F)	Kilkenny Castle, County Kilkenny	26 June 1887
Isle of Man	28.9 °C (84.0 °F)	Isle of Man Airport	12 July 1983
Italy	48.8 °C (119.8 °F)	Floridia, Sicily	11 August 2021
Jersey	39.3 °C (102.7 °F)	Mason St Louis	25 June 2026
Kosovo	42.5 °C (108.5 °F)	Klina	25 July 2025
Latvia	37.8 °C (100.0 °F)	Ventspils	4 August 2014
Liechtenstein	37.4 °C (99.3 °F)	Ruggell	13 August 2003
Lithuania	37.5 °C (99.5 °F)	Zarasai, Utena County	30 July 1994
Luxembourg	41.4 °C (106.5 °F)	Remich, Remich	25 July 2019
Malta	43.8 °C (110.8 °F)	Malta International Airport	9 August 1999
Moldova	42.4 °C (108.3 °F)	Fălești	7 August 2012
Monaco	35.1 °C (95.2 °F)	Monaco	20 July 2022
Montenegro	44.8 °C (112.6 °F)	Podgorica; Danilovgrad	16 August 2007; 8 August 2012
Netherlands	40.7 °C (105.3 °F)	Gilze en Rijen, North Brabant (Note: A disputed record temperature of 42.9 °C (109.4 °F) was measured on 25 July 2019 in Deelen, Gelderland.)	25 July 2019
North Macedonia	45.7 °C (114.3 °F)	Demir Kapija, Demir Kapija	24 July 2007
Northern Cyprus	46.6 °C (115.9 °F)	Lefkoniko	2010
Norway	35.6 °C (96.1 °F)	Nesbyen, Buskerud	20 June 1970
Poland	40.5 °C (104.9 °F)	Słubice	28 June 2026
Portugal	47.4 °C (117.3 °F)	Amareleja, Beja	1 August 2003
Romania	44.5 °C (112.1 °F)	Ion Sion, Brăila County	10 August 1951
Russia (European part)	45.4 °C (113.7 °F)	Utta, Kalmykia	12 July 2010
San Marino	40.3 °C (104.5 °F)	Serravalle	3 August 2017; 9 August 2017
Serbia	44.9 °C (112.8 °F)	Smederevska Palanka, Podunavlje	24 July 2007
Slovakia	42.2 °C (108.0 °F)	Dolne Plachtince	6 August 2026
Slovenia	40.8 °C (105.4 °F)	Cerklje ob Krki	8 August 2013
Spain	47.6 °C (117.7 °F)	La Rambla, Cordoba (as La Rambla Privilegio)	14 August 2021
Svalbard	21.7 °C (71.1 °F)	Longyearbyen	25 July 2020
Sweden	38.0 °C (100.4 °F)	Ultuna, Uppsala County; Målilla, Kalmar County	9 July 1933; 29 June 1947
Switzerland	41.5 °C (106.7 °F)	Grono, Moesa District	11 August 2003
Ukraine	42.0 °C (107.6 °F)	Luhansk	12 August 2010
United Kingdom	40.3 °C (104.5 °F)	Coningsby, Lincolnshire	19 July 2022
Vatican City	40.8 °C (105.4 °F)	Vatican City	28 June 2022
North America
Anguilla	34.2 °C (93.6 °F)	The Valley	12 September 2015
Antigua and Barbuda	34.9 °C (94.8 °F)	V. C. Bird International Airport, St. John's	12 August 1995
Bahamas	36.7 °C (98.1 °F)	Freeport	15 August 2026
Barbados	35.6 °C (96.1 °F)	Saint James	September 2023
Belize	42.3 °C (108.1 °F)	Barton Creek	10 April 2024
British Virgin Islands	35.0 °C (95.0 °F)	Terrance B. Lettsome International Airport	22 July 2016
Canada	49.6 °C (121.3 °F)	Lytton, British Columbia	29 June 2021
Cayman Islands	35.3 °C (95.5 °F)	Owen Roberts International Airport, Grand Cayman	21 July 2023
Costa Rica	41.5 °C (106.7 °F)	Cerro Huacalito, Guanacaste Province	23 March 2024
Cuba	39.7 °C (103.5 °F)	Veguitas (Granma Province)	12 April 2020
Dominica	36.6 °C (97.9 °F)	Canefield Airport	27 August 2023
Dominican Republic	41.4 °C (106.5 °F)	Mao	8 August 2024
Greenland	25.9 °C (78.6 °F)	Maniitsoq	30 July 2013
Guatemala	45.0 °C (113.0 °F)	Estanzuela, Zacapa	12 May 1998
Honduras	43.3 °C (109.9 °F)	San Pedro Sula	23 March 1987
Martinique	37.6 °C (99.7 °F)	Caravelle	1 October 2025
Mexico	52.0 °C (125.6 °F)	Mexicali; Tepache, Sonora	July 1995; 20 June 2024
Nicaragua	41.6 °C (106.9 °F)	Chinandega	2 April 1972
Panama	40.0 °C (104.0 °F)	San Francisco	20 March 1998
Puerto Rico	40.0 °C (104.0 °F)	Ponce; Aguirre	21 August 2003; 17 September 2020
United States	56.7 °C (134.1 °F)	Furnace Creek, Death Valley, California	10 July 1913
United States Virgin Islands	36.1 °C (97 °F)	Saint Croix	9 September 2023
Oceania
Australia	50.7 °C (123.3 °F)	Oodnadatta, South Australia; Onslow, Western Australia	2 January 1960; 13 January 2022
Cocos (Keeling) Islands	33.2 °C (91.8 °F)	Cocos (Keeling) Islands	3 December 2024
Fiji	37.4 °C (99.3 °F)	Vatukoula	2003
Marshall Islands	35.6 °C (96.1 °F)	Utirik Atoll	24 August 2016
Nauru	34.6 °C (94.3 °F)	Nauru Arc-2	2003
New Caledonia	39.9 °C (103.8 °F)	Boulouparis	2002
New Zealand	42.4 °C (108.3 °F)	Rangiora, Canterbury	7 February 1973
Palau	35.6 °C (96.1 °F)	Roman Tmetuchl International Airport	2 June 2024
Samoa	35.3 °C (95.5 °F)	Asau	24 December 1968
Solomon Islands	36.1 °C (97.0 °F)	Honiara, Guadalcanal Province	1 February 2010
Tonga	35.5 °C (95.9 °F)	Niuafoou	1 February 2016
Vanuatu	36.2 °C (97.2 °F)	Lamap Malekula	8 February 2016
Wallis and Futuna	35.8 °C (96.4 °F)	Futuna Airport	10 January 2016
South America
Argentina	47.3 °C (117.1 °F)	Campo Gallo, Santiago del Estero Province	16 October 1936
Aruba	36.5 °C (97.7 °F)	Queen Beatrix International Airport, Oranjestad	2003
Bolivia	47.0 °C (116.6 °F)	Villamontes, Tarija Department	7 October 2024
Bonaire	36.3 °C (97.3 °F)	Flamingo International Airport, Kralendijk	2008
Brazil	44.8 °C (112.6 °F)	Araçuaí, Minas Gerais	19 November 2023
Chile	45.0 °C (113.0 °F)	Cauquenes, Maule Region (Note: This record is disputed because of the forest fires that occurred around the town of Cauquenes. It is highly probable those fires have influenced this record.)	26 January 2017
Colombia	43.4 °C (110.1 °F)	Jerusalen, Cundinamarca	14 September 2024
French Guiana	39.3 °C (102.7 °F)	Grand-Santi	2024
Guyana	40.1 °C (104.2 °F)	Ebini	26 August 2023
Paraguay	46.2 °C (115.2 °F)	Las Palmas, Boquerón	10 December 2022
Peru	41.8 °C (107.2 °F)	Tingo de Ponaza	26 October 2024
Uruguay	44.0 °C (111.2 °F)	Paysandú, Paysandú Department; Florida, Florida Department	20 January 1943; 14 January 2022
Venezuela	43.6 °C (110.5 °F)	Santa Ana de Coro, Falcón	29 April 2015

==== Other high-temperature records ====
Country/Region	Temperature	Town/Location	Date	Record	Info
Australia	37.8 °C (100.0 °F)	Marble Bar, Western Australia	31 October 1923 to 7 April 1924 (160 days)	Most consecutive days above 37.8 °C (100 °F)	-
Iran	70.7 °C (159.3 °F)	Lut Desert	2005	Highest natural ground surface temperature	-
USA (California)	48.9 °C (120.0 °F)	Death Valley	9 July 1917 to 17 August 1917 (40 days)	Most consecutive days above 48.9 °C (120 °F)	-
USA (California)	48.3 °C (118.9 °F)	Imperial, California	24 July 2018	Highest temperature during rain	-
Oman	44.2 °C (111.6 °F)	Khasab weather station	17 June 2017	Highest overnight low temperature (Note: The former world record was 43.3 °C (110 °F) set on 5 July 1918, in Death Valley, California.)	-
Oman	42.6 °C (108.7 °F)	Qurayyat, Muscat Governorate	25 June 2018	Highest minimum temperature for a 24-hour period and for a calendar day	-
Kuwait	50.0 °C (122.0 °F)	Mitribah	July 2017	Most days 50 °C (122 °F) or above in a month (20 days)	-
Kuwait	50.3 °C (122.5 °F)	Mitribah	July 2017	Highest average daily high recorded for a month	-
USA (California)	42.5 °C (108.5 °F)	Death Valley	July 2024	Highest average monthly temperature	-
Russia	38.0 °C (100.4 °F)	Verkhoyansk, Sakha Republic	20 June 2020	Highest temperature north of the Arctic Circle	-
Canada	49.6 °C (121.3 °F)	Lytton, British Columbia	29 June 2021	Highest temperature ever recorded north of the 50th parallel north	-

==== Humidity ====
- Highest dew point temperature: A dew point of 35 °C (95 °F) — while the temperature was 42 °C (108 °F) — was observed at Dhahran, Saudi Arabia, at 3:00 p.m. on 8 July 2003. (The relative humidity was 69%).
- Highest heat index: In the observation above at Dhahran, Saudi Arabia, the heat index ("feels like" temperature) was 81.1 °C (178.0 °F).
- Highest temperature with 100% relative humidity: A temperature of 34 °C (93 °F) with 100% relative humidity in Jask, Iran, on 21 July 2012.

=== Coldest ===
==== Lowest temperatures recorded ====
The lowest temperature recorded is −89.2 °C (−128.6 °F), in Vostok Station, Antarctica on 21 July 1983.

Table of values
Country/Region	Temperature	Town/Location	Date
Africa
Algeria	−20.0 °C (−4.0 °F)	Batna	4 January 1945
Burkina Faso	5.0 °C (41.0 °F)	Markoye	January 1975
Egypt	−18.0 °C (−0.4 °F)	Gabal Katrina at elevation of 2,629 m While −6 °C in Saint Katherine City at 1,586 m. Sinai Peninsula is geologically part of the African Plate, but geographically it is considered to be in Asia.	?
Botswana	−10.6 °C (12.9 °F)	Tsabong	30 July 1953
Eswatini (Swaziland)	−6.1 °C (21.0 °F)	Mbabane	22 July 1957
Gambia	4.4 °C (39.9 °F)	Boraba	February 1904
Ghana	6.7 °C (44.1 °F)	Bui	January 1957
Guinea	1.4 °C (34.5 °F)	Mali, Guinea	January 2009
Lesotho	−21.0 °C (−5.8 °F)		?
Madagascar	−8.5 °C (16.7 °F)	Nanokely	23 July 1963; August 1964
Morocco (then the French protectorate in Morocco)	−23.9 °C (−11.0 °F)	Ifrane	11 February 1935
Niger	−2.4 °C (27.7 °F)	Bilma	13 January 1995
Réunion	−5.0 °C (23.0 °F)	Gite de Bellecombe	10 September 1975
South Africa	−20.1 °C (−4.2 °F)	Buffelsfontein, near Molteno, Eastern Cape	23 August 2013
Spain (Canarias)	−14.5 °C (5.9 °F)	Teide, Tenerife	29 January 2018
Sudan	−1.0 °C (30.2 °F)	Zalingei	December 1961; January 1962
Antarctica
Antarctica	−89.2 °C (−128.6 °F)	Vostok Station	21 July 1983 (Note: This temperature is considered the lowest ever officially recorded in Antarctica and in the World, as it was perceived by ground-positioned thermometers in 1983. Satellite analyses made on 10 August 2010 pointed to a temperature of −93.2 °C (−135.8 °F) near Dome F in Queen Maud Land, but this record is not officially listed because it was measured by remote sensing methods that are not totally consistent, unlike the 1983 temperature. See Lowest temperature recorded on Earth for details.)
Asia
Afghanistan	−52.2 °C (−62.0 °F)	Shahrak	January 1964
Armenia	−46.3 °C (−51.3 °F)	Paghakn	January 2007
Azerbaijan	−33.0 °C (−27.4 °F)	Julfa and Ordubad	?
Bangladesh (then the Bengal Presidency of British India)	1.1 °C (34.0 °F)	Dinajpur	3 February 1905
China	−53.0 °C (−63.4 °F)	Mohe City, Heilongjiang	22 January 2023
Cambodia	7.0 °C (44.6 °F)	Mondulkiri, Ratanakiri and Preah Vihear	29 January 2007
Hong Kong	−6.0 °C (21.2 °F)	Tai Mo Shan	24 January 2016
India/Pakistan (disputed territory of Ladakh in Kashmir)	−34.0 °C (−29.2 °F)	Durbuk, Ladakh	17 February 2010
Indonesia	−5.6 °C (21.9 °F)	Kertasari	29 July 1915; 1922
Iran	−36.0 °C (−32.8 °F)	Saqqez	1972
Israel	−14.2 °C (6.4 °F)	Merom Golan, Golan Heights	10 January 2015
Japan	−41.0 °C (−41.8 °F)	Asahikawa, Hokkaidō	25 January 1902
Jordan	−16.0 °C (3.2 °F)	Shoubak	15 December 2013
Kazakhstan	−57.0 °C (−70.6 °F)	Atbasar	January 1893
Kuwait	−4.8 °C (23.4 °F)	Salmy	3 January 2009
Kyrgyzstan	−53.6 °C (−64.5 °F)	Fergana Valley	?
Lebanon	−23.1 °C (−9.6 °F)	Yammoune	20 January 1964
Malaysia	−5 °C (23 °F)	Mount Kinabalu	7 April 2023
Maldives	18.2 °C (64.8 °F)	Hanimaadhoo	23 December 2002
Mongolia	−55.6 °C (−68.1 °F)	Züüngovi, Uvs Province	26 December 1966
Myanmar	−6.0 °C (21.2 °F)	Hakha	30 December 1990
Nepal	−23.2 °C (−9.8 °F)	Tsho Rolpa Lake	16 February 1995
North Korea	−43.6 °C (−46.5 °F)	Sinmusong	2 January 1977
Oman	−9.7 °C (14.5 °F)	Jabel Shams	20 January 2015
Pakistan/India (undemarcated Kashmir area in disputed territory of Kashmir)	−26.0 °C (−14.8 °F)	Astore	December 1910
Philippines	3.0 °C (37.4 °F)	Baguio	8 January 1907
Qatar	1.5 °C (34.7 °F)	Abu Samra	5 February 2017
Russia (Asia) (first in the Russian Empire, then in the Russian SFSR, Soviet Union)	−67.8 °C (−90.0 °F)	Verkhoyansk and Oymyakon, both in Sakha Republic	15 January 1885; 5, 7 February 1892; 6 February 1933
Saudi Arabia	−12.0 °C (10.4 °F)	Turaif	February 1950
Singapore	19.0 °C (66.2 °F)	Paya Lebar	14 February 1989
South Korea	−32.6 °C (−26.7 °F)	Yangpyeong	5 January 1981
Sri Lanka	−2.7 °C (27.1 °F)	Nuwara Eliya	8 February 1914
Syria	−23.0 °C (−9.4 °F)	Idlib	January 1951
Taiwan	−18.4 °C (−1.1 °F)	Yushan	31 January 1970
Thailand	−1.5 °C (29.3 °F)	Dan Sai	5 January 1974
Turkey	−45.6 °C (−50.1 °F)	Ağrı, Ağrı Province	20 January 1972
Turkmenistan	−36.0 °C (−32.8 °F)	Daşoguz Region	?
United Arab Emirates	−5.7 °C (21.7 °F)	Jebel Jais, Ras Al Khaimah	3 February 2017
Vietnam (then DR Vietnam)	−6.1 °C (21.0 °F)	Sa Pa Ward, Lào Cai Province	4 January 1974
Europe
Albania	−34.7 °C (−30.5 °F)	Bizë	N/A (Note: The guide highlights Bizë as the coldest area within Tirana County, noting the −34.7 °C minimum as a defining climatic feature of the region's high-altitude terrain. Rather than treating the value as exceptional, it is presented as a distinguishing trait of Bizë's geography within the county's climatic profile.) (Note: The recorded low of −34.7 °C at Bizë is the lowest well-documented temperature in an inhabited area in Albania, though the source explicitly states Bizë is one of the country's coldest villages rather than the absolute coldest. Temperatures of this level are relatively typical for Albania's continental mountain regions, notably the higher elevations like Mount Korab and the Northern Alps, which annually experience −25 °C temperatures, often approach −35 °C, and occasionally experience exceptional lows near −40 °C, although rarely with formal documentation due to the limited presence of weather stations in those regions.)
Austria	−52.6 °C (−62.7 °F)	Grünloch doline	19 February 1932
Belarus (then the Byelorussian SSR, Soviet Union)	−42.2 °C (−44.0 °F)	Slavnom, Vitebsk Region	17 January 1940
Belgium	−30.1 °C (−22.2 °F)	Valley of the Lesse in Rochefort	20 January 1940
Bosnia and Herzegovina (then the SR Bosnia and Herzegovina, SFR Yugoslavia)	−43.5 °C (−46.3 °F)	Veliko Polje	24 January 1963
Bulgaria	−38.3 °C (−36.9 °F)	Tran	25 January 1947
Croatia	−34.6 °C (−30.3 °F)	Gračac	13 January 2003 (Note: A reading of −35.5 °C (−31.9 °F) in Čakovec on 3 February 1929 and −36.0 °C (−32.8 °F) in Gospić were not measured under standard conditions and are not considered to be official record lows in Croatia.)
Cyprus	−12.8 °C (9.0 °F)	Trikoukia, Prodromos	30 January 1964
Czech Republic (then part of Czechoslovakia)	−42.2 °C (−44.0 °F)	Litvínovice	11 February 1929
Denmark	−31.2 °C (−24.2 °F)	Thisted Municipality, North Denmark Region	8 January 1982
Estonia	−43.5 °C (−46.3 °F)	Jõgeva, Jõgeva County	17 January 1940
Finland	−51.5 °C (−60.7 °F)	Pokka, Kittilä, Lapland	28 January 1999
France	−41.2 °C (−42.2 °F)	Mouthe, Doubs	17 January 1985
Germany	−45.9 °C (−50.6 °F)	Funtensee, Berchtesgadener Land, Bavaria	24 December 2001
Greece	−27.8 °C (−18.0 °F)	Ptolemaida	27 January 1963
Hungary	−35.0 °C (−31.0 °F)	Görömbölytapolca	16 February 1940
Iceland (then Danish Iceland)	−37.9 °C (−36.2 °F)	Grímsstaðir	21 January 1918
Ireland (then part of the United Kingdom)	−19.1 °C (−2.4 °F)	Markree Castle, County Sligo	16 January 1881
Italy	−50.6 °C (−59.1 °F)	Busa Riviera, Pale di San Martino	7 January 2022
Latvia	−43.2 °C (−45.8 °F)	Daugavpils	8 February 1956
Lithuania	−42.9 °C (−45.2 °F)	Utena, Utena County	1 February 1956
Luxembourg	−24.6 °C (−12.3 °F)	Wiltz	22 January 1942
Malta	−1.7 °C (28.9 °F)	Ta' Qali	1 February 1962
Moldova	−35.5 °C (−31.9 °F)	Brătușeni, Edineț District	20 January 1963
Monaco	−5.2 °C (22.6 °F)	Monaco	10 February 1986
Netherlands (then Nazi-occupied Netherlands)	−27.4 °C (−17.3 °F)	Winterswijk, Gelderland	27 January 1942
North Macedonia (then the SR Macedonia, SFR Yugoslavia)	−31.5 °C (−24.7 °F)	Berovo, Berovo Municipality	27 January 1954
Norway (then part of Sweden–Norway)	−51.4 °C (−60.5 °F)	Karasjok, Finnmark	1 January 1886
Poland	−41.1 °C (−42.0 °F)	Litworowy Kocioł, Western Tatras	17 February 2025
Portugal	−16.0 °C (3.2 °F)	Penhas da Saúde, Covilhã Municipality; Miranda do Douro	16 January 1945 and 5 February 1954
Romania	−38.5 °C (−37.3 °F)	Bod, Brașov County	25 January 1942
Russia (Europe) (then the Russian SFSR, Soviet Union)	−58.1 °C (−72.6 °F)	Ust-Shchuger, Komi Republic	31 December 1978
Serbia	−39.8 °C (−39.6 °F)	Karajukića Bunari, Zlatibor District	26 January 2006
Slovakia (then Czechoslovakia)	−41.0 °C (−41.8 °F)	Vígľaš-Pstruša	11 February 1929
Slovenia (then SR Slovenia, SFR Yugoslavia)	−34.5 °C (−30.1 °F)	Babno Polje	15 February 1956; 16 February 1956; 13 January 1968 (Note: The lowest unofficially measured temperature in Slovenia was recorded at Komna on 9 January 2009 and reached −49 °C (−56 °F).)
Spain	−32.0 °C (−25.6 °F)	Estany Gento (Province of Lleida) (Note: The records of −34.1 °C (−29.4 °F) of Clot del Tuc de la Llança, Catalonia, and −35.4 °C (−31.7 °F) of Vega de Liordes, León, both registered in January 2021, are not recognized by AEMET.)	2 February 1956
Sweden	−52.6 °C (−62.7 °F)	Vuoggatjålme, Lappland	2 February 1966
Switzerland	−42.5 °C (−44.5 °F)	La Brévine	12 January 1987
Ukraine (then the Ukrainian SSR, Soviet Union)	−41.9 °C (−43.4 °F)	Luhansk	8 January 1935
United Kingdom	−27.2 °C (−17.0 °F)	Braemar, Aberdeenshire; Altnaharra, Sutherland	11 February 1895; 10 January 1982; 30 December 1995
North America
Antigua and Barbuda	16.1 °C (61.0 °F)	V. C. Bird International Airport, Antigua	31 December 1974 and 28 January 1976
Canada	−63.0 °C (−81.4 °F)	Snag, Yukon	3 February 1947
Cayman Islands	11.1 °C (52.0 °F)	Owen Roberts International Airport, Grand Cayman	11 February 1968
Cuba	0.0 °C (32.0 °F)	Indio Hatuey, Matanzas Province	3 February 2026
Dominican Republic	−7.0 °C (19.4 °F)	Valle Nuevo, La Vega Province	17 January 1983
Greenland	−69.6 °C (−93.3 °F)	Klinck Automated Weather Station, Greenland Ice Sheet	22 December 1991
Guatemala	−11.5 °C (11.3 °F)	Olintepeque, Quetzaltenango Department	January 1987
Martinique	12.1 °C (53.8 °F)	Champflore	11 December 2022
Mexico	−30.0 °C (−22.0 °F)	Ahumada Municipality	11 January 1962
Panama	2.0 °C (35.6 °F)	Bajo Grande, Chiriquí Province	20 February 1995
Puerto Rico	7.2 °C (45 °F)	Garza	24 March 1955
US Virgin Islands	16.1 °C (61 °F)	Saint Croix	20 January 2000
United States (Alaska)	−62.2 °C (−80 °F)	Prospect Creek, Alaska	23 January 1971
United States (contiguous)	−56.7 °C (−70 °F)	Rogers Pass, Montana	20 January 1954
South America
Argentina	−30.0 °C (−22.0 °F)	Alto Rio Senguer, Chubut Province	24 July 2001
Brazil	−14.0 °C (6.8 °F)	Caçador, Santa Catarina	11 June 1952
Chile	−37.0 °C (−34.6 °F)	Coyhaique Alto, Aysen Region	21 June 2002
Colombia	−11.0 °C (12.2 °F)	Páramo de Berlín, Tona, Santander	11 December 1974
Curaçao	18.9 °C (66.0 °F)	Willemstad	12 December 2017
Guyana	13.0 °C (55.4 °F)	Kaieteur Falls	January 2004
French Guiana	14.8 °C (58.6 °F)	Saül	13 October 1975
Paraguay	−7.5 °C (18.5 °F)	Pratts Gill, Boquerón Department	13 July 2000
Peru	−28.2 °C (−18.8 °F)	Macusani, Puno Region	6 July 1968
Uruguay	−11.0 °C (12.2 °F)	Melo, Cerro Largo Department	14 June 1967
Oceania
Australia	−23.0 °C (−9.4 °F)	Charlotte Pass, New South Wales	29 June 1994
United States (Hawaii)	−12.8 °C (9.0 °F)	Mauna Kea, Hawaii	?
Nauru	20.4 °C (68.7 °F)	Yaren District	6 August 1922
New Zealand	−25.6 °C (−14.1 °F)	Ranfurly, Central Otago	17 July 1903
Samoa	8.4 °C (47.1 °F)	Afiamalu	?
Solomon Islands	16.6 °C (61.9 °F)	Honiara International Airport	11 August 1993

==== Other low-temperature records ====
- Coldest summer (month of July in the Northern Hemisphere): −33 °C (−27.4 °F); Summit Camp, Greenland on 4 July 2017.
- Lowest temperature in the Northern Hemisphere: −69.6 °C (−93.3 °F); Greenland Ice Sheet, Greenland on 22 December 1991.
- Coldest average monthly temperature in the Northern Hemisphere: −56.7 °C (−70.1 °F); Verkhoyansk, Russia for the month of January 1892.
- Coldest temperature in the tropics: −28.2 °C (−18.8 °F); Macusani, Peru on 6 July 1968.

=== Record extreme temperature differences ===
- Greatest 2-minute temperature increase: 27 °C (49 °F), from −20 °C (−4 °F) to 7 °C (45 °F); Spearfish, South Dakota, on 22 January 1943.
- Greatest 24-hour temperature increase: +57 °C (+102.6 °F), from −48 °C (−54 °F) to 9 °C (48 °F); Loma, Montana, on 15 January 1972.
- Greatest 2 minute temperature drop: 15.0 °C (27.0 °F) at Sydney Airport, Australia, on 23 January 2010, from 41.0 °C (105.8 °F) at 3:11PM to 26.0 °C (78.8 °F) at 3:13PM.
- Largest temperature range in one area: 105.8 °C (190.4 °F), from −67.8 °C (−90.0 °F) on 15 January 1885, 5,7 February 1892 to 38.0 °C (100.4 °F) on 20 June 2020; Verkhoyansk, Sakha Republic, Russia

== Precipitation ==
- Least per year (locale): 0.2 millimetres (0.008 in) per year or less, Quillagua, Antofagasta Region, Chile.

=== Rain ===
- Most in 60 seconds (1 minute): 38 mm (1.5 in). Barot, Sainte-Anne, Grande-Terre, Guadeloupe, France 11:03–11:04 am on 26 November 1970.
- Most in 180 seconds (3 minutes): 62 mm (2.4 in). Portobelo, Colón, Panama, 29 November 1911
- Most in 300 seconds (5 minutes): 106 mm (4.2 in). Portobelo, Colón, Panama, 29 November 1911
- Most in 60 minutes (1 hour): 305 mm (12.0 in). Holt, Missouri, United States, 22 June 1947.
- Most in 12 hours (1/2-day): 1,144 mm (45.0 in); Cilaos, Réunion, 8 January 1966, during Tropical Cyclone Denise.
- Most in 24 hours (1 day): 1,825 mm (71.9 in); Cilaos, Réunion, 7–8 January 1966, during Tropical Cyclone Denise.
- Most in 48 hours (2 days): 2,493 mm (98.1 in); Cherrapunji, Meghalaya, India, 15–16 June 1995.
- Most in 72 hours (3 days): 3,929 mm (154.7 in); Commerson, Réunion, 24–26 February 2007, during Cyclone Gamede.
- Most in 96 hours (4 days): 4,869 mm (191.7 in); Commerson, Réunion, 24–27 February 2007, during Cyclone Gamede.
- Most in one year: 26,470 mm (1,042 in); Cherrapunji, Meghalaya, India, 1860–1861.
- Most from a single tropical cyclone: 6,433 mm (253.3 in); Commerson, Réunion, during Cyclone Hyacinthe in January 1980.
- Highest average annual total (observed over 10 years): 11,872 mm (467.4 in) (over 38 years) and 12,701 mm (500.0 in) (1998–2010); Mawsynram, Meghalaya, India or 13,466 mm (530.2 in) (1980–2011); López de Micay, Cauca, Colombia.
- Most consecutive days with measurable rain a day with at least 0.01 inches (0.25 mm) of rainfall: 331 days in Oahu, Hawaii, 1939–1940

=== Snow ===
- Most in a 24-hour period: 230 centimetres (90.6 in) of snow on Mount Ibuki, Japan on 14 February 1927.
- Most in one calendar month: 9.91 meters (390 inches) of snow fell in Tamarack, California, in January 1911, leading to a snow depth in March of 11.46 meters (451 inches) (greatest measured in North America).
- Most in one season (1 July – 30 June): 29.0 meters, (95 ft); Mount Baker, Washington, United States, 1998 through 1999.
- Most in one-year period: 31.5 meters (102 ft); Mount Rainier, Washington, United States, 19 February 1971 to 18 February 1972.
- Deepest snowfall recorded: 11.82 meters (38.8 ft) on Mount Ibuki, Japan on 14 February 1927.
- Lowest latitude that snow has been recorded at sea level in North America: Snow fell as far south as the city of Tampico, Mexico, in February 1895 during the Great Freeze.
- Highest temperature that has been recorded on a day with snow: On March 12, 2026, in Arlington, Virginia, a high temperature of 77 degrees Fahrenheit (25 degrees Celsius) was reached shortly after midnight. Later in the day, 2mm of snow were recorded.

== Wind speeds ==
- Fastest ever recorded: 484±32 km/h (301±20 mph) (3-second gust); calculated by a DOW (Doppler On Wheels) radar unit in the 1999 Bridge Creek–Moore tornado between Oklahoma City and Moore, Oklahoma, USA, 3 May 1999. In 2007, the wind speeds were re-examined and adjusted to a maximum official wind speed of 321 mph (516.6 km/h). A DOW calculation of a subvortex of the 2013 El Reno tornado was estimated in a range of 257–336 mph (414–541 km/h) in 2024.
- Fastest non-tornadic winds: 408 km/h (254 mph) (3-second gust); recorded by anemometer in Severe Tropical Cyclone Olivia passing over Barrow Island, Western Australia, 10 April 1996.
- Fastest non-cyclonic winds: 372 km/h (231 mph) (1-minute average); recorded by anemometer on Mount Washington, New Hampshire, USA, 12 April 1934.
- Fastest daily average: 174 km/h (108 mph); Port Martin (Adélie Land), Antarctica, 24-hour period from 21 March 1951 to 22 March 1951.

== Tornadoes ==
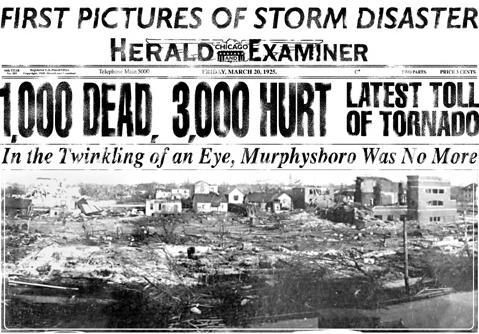
The Tri-State Tornado holds many records, including the longest known tornado track, fastest speed for a significant tornado, and the deadliest tornado outside of Bangladesh.

=== Deadliest in history ===
- On Earth: Approximately 1,300 deaths (Daulatpur–Saturia tornado); Manikganj District, Bangladesh on 26 April 1989.
- In North America: 695 deaths (Tri-State Tornado); Missouri, Illinois, Indiana, United States, 18 March 1925.
- In Europe: 600 or more deaths (Grand Harbour Tornado); Valletta, Malta, 23 September 1551 or 1556 (sources conflict).
- In South America: 300 deaths (1926 Encarnación tornado), Encarnacióm, Paraguay, 20 September 1926.
- In Australia: Three deaths, Kin Kin, Queensland tornado, 14 August 1971.

=== Outbreaks ===
- Largest: The 2011 Super Outbreak: 207 confirmed tornadoes occurred in a span of 24 hours on April 27, 2011, with a total of 367 occurring throughout the duration of the outbreak. They affected six US states, and included 33 rated EF2, 21 rated EF3, 11 rated EF4, and 4 rated EF5.
- Most severe: The 1974 Super Outbreak produced 7 F5, 23 F4, 34 F3, and 34 F2 tornadoes on April 3–4, 1974. It received a score on expert Thomas P. Grazulis's outbreak intensity score of 578, surpassing the 2011 outbreak's score of 378.

== Tropical cyclones ==
=== Most intense (by minimum surface air pressure) ===
- Most intense ever recorded: 870 hPa (25.69 inHg); eye of Super Typhoon Tip over the northwest Pacific Ocean, 12 October 1979.
- Most intense in the Western Hemisphere: 872 hPa (25.75 inHg); eye of Hurricane Patricia over the eastern Pacific Ocean, 23 October 2015.
- Most intense ever recorded on land: 892 hPa (26.35 inHg); Craig Key, Florida, United States, eye of the Labor Day Hurricane, 2 September 1935. While other landfalling tropical cyclones potentially had lower pressures, data is vague from areas other than the Atlantic basin, especially before the invention of weather satellites.
- Most intense landfall (estimated): 884 hPa (26.10 inHg); Rakiraki District, Viti Levu, Fiji, during Cyclone Winston, 20 February 2016. Although no official land pressure readings were recorded at the landfall site, it is estimated that Winston made landfall with the aforementioned pressure. A reading of 880hPa (26inHg) from Bathurst Bay, Queensland, Australia, during Cyclone Mahina, on 4 March 1899 is disputed to have been recorded by Captain William Porter, the same person who recorded the currently established mark of 914hPa (27inHg). Further evidence to back up this claim comes in the form of an eyewitness estimate for the storm surge at Ninian Bay, 30 km from Bathurst Bay, which was said to be approximately 13m. This figure would be consistent with the pressure of 880 hPa (26 inHg) allegedly recorded by Capt. Porter.

=== Most precipitation ===
- Most precipitation from a single tropical storm: 6,433 mm (253.3 in); Commerson, Réunion, during Cyclone Hyacinthe in January 1980.

== Other severe weather ==
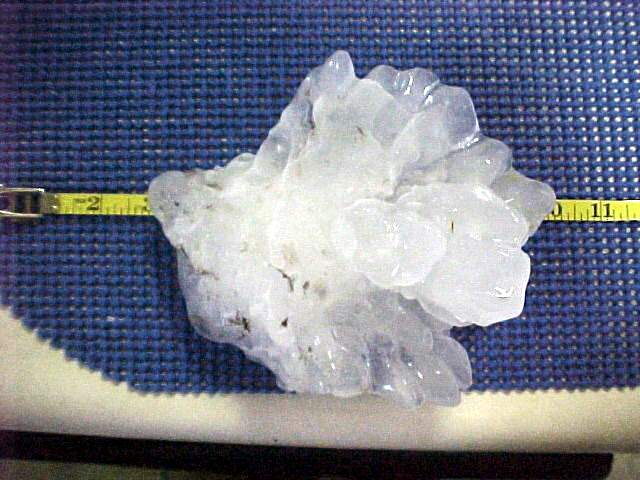
A picture of the Aurora, Nebraska hailstone, measured at 47.6 cm (18.75 in) in circumference

Satellite loop of the record-breaking supercell near Chicago producing intense lightning on June 13, 2022

=== Hail ===
- Heaviest officially recorded: 1.02 kg (2.25 lb); Gopalganj District, Bangladesh, 14 April 1986.
- Largest diameter officially measured: 20 cm (8.0 in) diameter, 47.3 cm (18.625 in) circumference; Vivian, South Dakota, USA, 23 July 2010.
- Largest circumference officially measured: 47.6 cm (18.75 in) circumference, 17.8 cm (7.0 in) diameter; Aurora, Nebraska, USA, 22 June 2003.

=== Lightning ===
- Longest lightning bolt: 829 km (515 mi) ± 8 km. On 22 October 2017, extended from eastern Texas to near Kansas City, United States.
- Longest duration for a single lightning flash: 17.1 seconds on 18 June 2020 in Uruguay and northern Argentina.

=== Ultraviolet index ===
- Highest ultraviolet index measured: On 29 December 2003, a UV index of 43.3 was detected at Chile/Bolivia's Licancabur volcano, at 19,423 feet (5,920 m) altitude. A light-skinned individual in such conditions may experience moderate sunburn in as little as 4 minutes.

=== Thunderstorm cloud height ===
- Tallest non-tropical thunderstorm The official confirmed tallest thunderstorm was a supercell that occurred on May 24, 2016 near Nueva Rosita, in rural areas of the Mexican state of Coahuila, in the Big Bend area of the Rio Grande basin. This storm had a cloud top height of 68,000 ft (21 km; 12.9 mi). Lightning from this storm was detected as far as 50–60 mi (80–97 km) away from the center of the storm. A supercell thunderstorm that struck Chicago, Illinois and surrounding areas on June 13, 2022, may have surpassed its height, being at least over 60,000 ft (18 km; 11 mi) and potentially reaching as high as 65,000–70,000 ft (20–21 km; 12.3–13.3 mi) above the ground.

== Other categories ==
- Highest air pressure ever recorded [above 750 meters (2,461 feet)]: 1084.8 hPa (32.03 inHg); Tosontsengel, Zavkhan, Mongolia, 19 December 2001. This is the equivalent sea-level pressure; Tosontsengel is located at 1,300 metres (4,300 ft) above sea level.

The highest adjusted-to-sea-level barometric pressure ever recorded (below 750 meters) was at Agata, Evenkiyskiy, Russia (66°53′N 93°28′E, elevation: 261 m (856.3 ft)) on 31 December 1968 of 1083.3 hectopascals (hPa) (31.99 inHg).
The discrimination is due to the problematic assumptions (assuming a standard lapse rate) associated with reduction of sea level from high elevations.

== See also ==
- Weather of 2013
- Extremes on Earth
- List of extreme temperatures in Canada
- List of snowiest places in the United States by state
- U.S. state and territory temperature extremes
- United Kingdom weather records
- Weather extremes in Canada
- Climate change
