= China–Iceland relations =

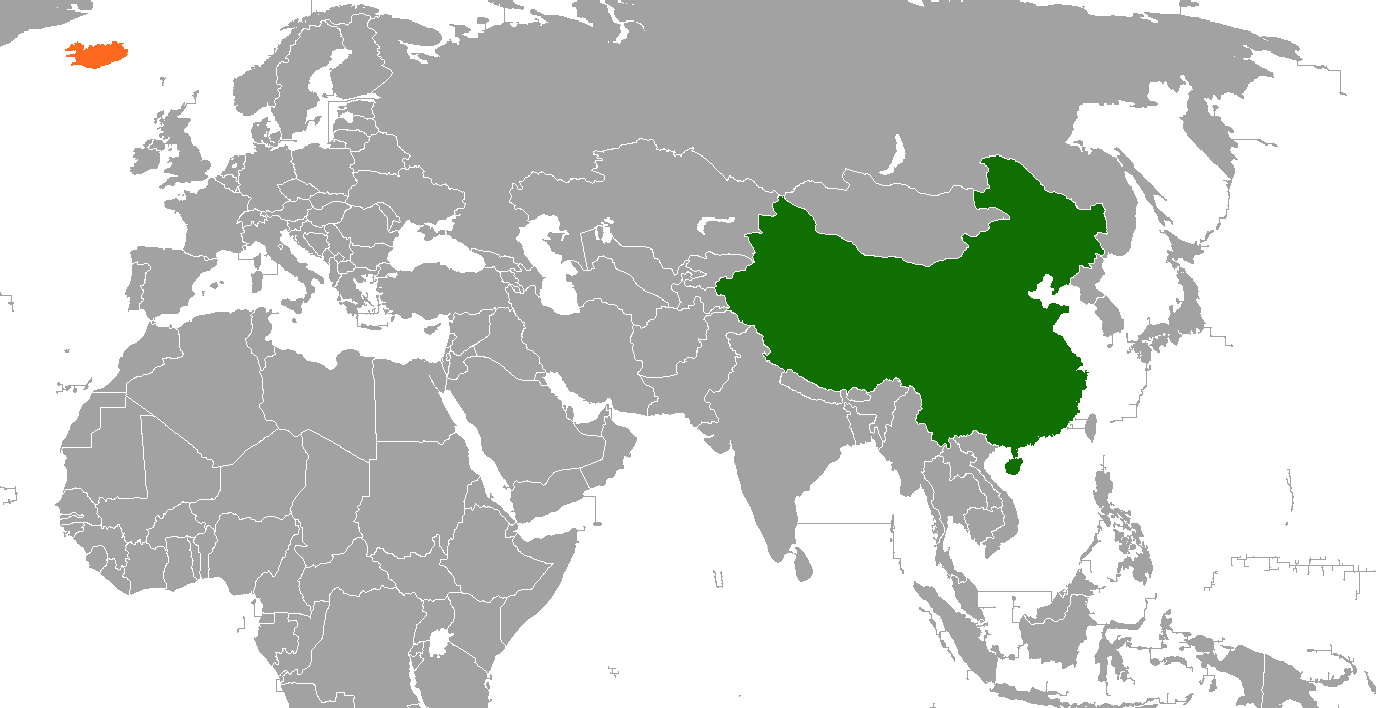
- China: Iceland

Diplomatic mission
- Embassy of China, Reykjavík: Embassy of Iceland, Beijing

Envoy
- Zhang Keyuan: Stefán Skjaldarson

China–Iceland relations formally began on 8 December 1971, when Iceland recognised Beijing. Prior to the signing of a Free Trade Agreement between the two countries in 2013, diplomatic activities between them were relatively few in number. However, since this event, political cooperation has increased. There is growing number of economic and cultural ties, as their political partnership has expanded.

In addition, Iceland is helping to develop China's renewable energy sector; specifically, in the field of geothermal power.

== History ==
In May 1972, China assigned the first resident ambassador to Iceland.

In 1995, Iceland set up its embassy in Beijing and assigned its first resident ambassador to China.

In December 1995, China resumed the practice of sending resident ambassadors to Iceland (between 1983 and 1995, the Chinese ambassador to Copenhagen, Denmark, was also accredited to Iceland).

In 2005, Iceland was the first country to recognise China as a market economy.

In 2010, Enex, an Icelandic firm, signed an agreement on digging for geothermal energy in Inner Mongolia and Shaanxi, China.

In 2011, Chinese tycoon Huang Nubo offered to buy Grímsstaðir in North-East Iceland. The deal fell through.

In 2013, Iceland signed a Free Trade Agreement with China.

== Economic relations ==
=== The Free Trade Agreement (FTA) ===
On the 15 April 2013, Iceland and China signed a Free Trade Agreement. The agreement was signed by the Minister for Foreign Affairs and External Trade of Iceland, Mr. Össur Skarphéðinsson, and Mr. Gao Hucheng, Minister of Commerce of the People’s Republic of China. The negotiations began in 2007 and spanned until 2013. The agreement eventuated after four rounds of talks during 2007–2008, and two rounds in December 2012 and January 2013.

The FTA was China's first with a member state of the European Economic Area. It covers trade in goods and services, rules of origin, trade facilitation, intellectual property rights, institutional provisions, dispute settlement, competition and investment.

The FTA removed all tariffs on industrial products from China. This accounted for 99% of Chinese exports to Iceland at the time of signing. In addition, tariffs on 7830 tariff lines of Icelandic imports were removed. This accounted for 82% of Icelandic exports to China at the time of signing.

The tariffs on a small class of exports to China will be removed following a transitional period of 5 to 10 years.

=== Economic relations prior to agreement ===
Trade between Iceland and China prior to the FTA was small in scale. In 2011, less than 1% of Iceland's total export went to China, and more than 7% of Iceland's imports came from China. The trade balance was in favour of China. From 1999 to 2011, exports from Iceland to China grew by 1.400%, while Icelandic imports from China grew by 1.000%. The majority of trade between the two nations consisted of seafood products, as it accounted for 94.3% of Icelandic exports to China between 2009 and 2011.

Trade was progressively increasing. During the period of 2011 to 2012, Icelandic exports to China increased by 41%, reaching US$61.2 million. In the same time period, Icelandic imports from China increased by 84%, reaching US$340.8 million. In 2012, China ranked fourth in imports into Iceland and was its largest trading partner in Asia. In addition, China ranked nineteenth in Iceland's export market.

== Cultural relations ==
=== Tourism ===
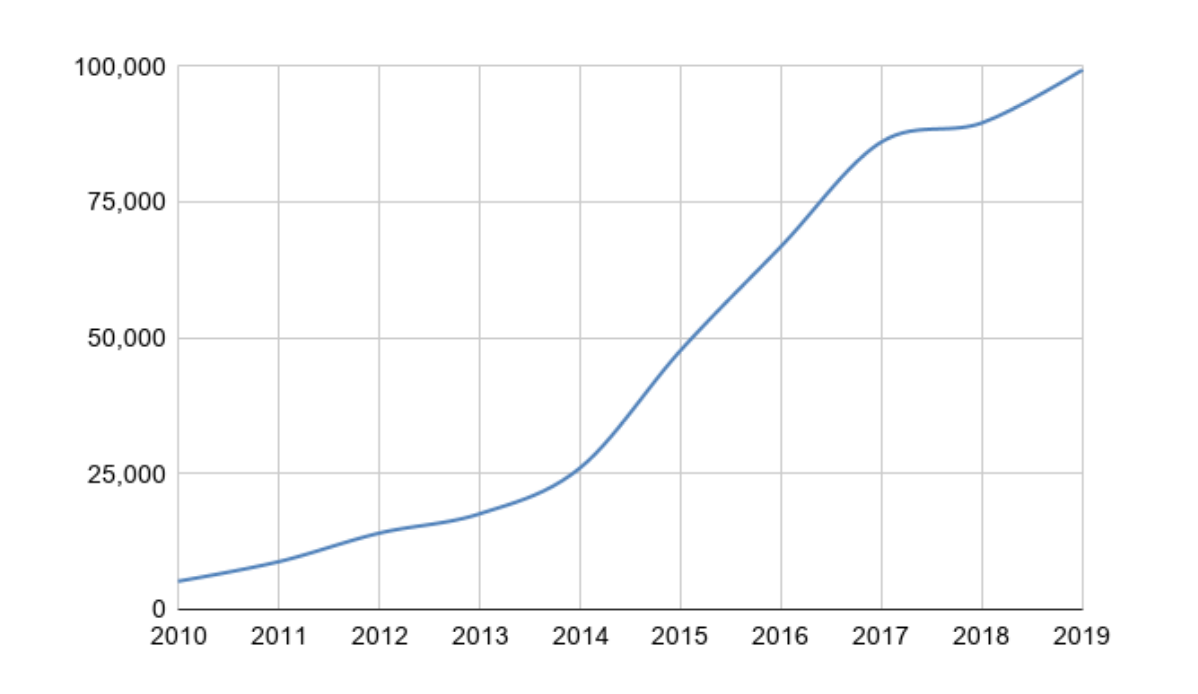
Number of Chinese tourists that travelled to Iceland between 2010 and 2019.

Chinese tourism to Iceland is a nascent, but growing sector. In 2006, Chinese tourists accounted for 1.1% of Iceland's total international visitors. There were an estimated 10,000 Chinese tourists to the country that year. Tourism numbers began to noticeably rise in 2015, as 47,643 Chinese people visited Iceland. The following year this number increased by 40%, and in 2017 it increased by 80%. By 2019, a little less than 100,000 Chinese tourists visited Iceland. That is 10 times more than the number that visited in 2006. Chinese tourists made up 5% of Iceland's total international visitors for that year.

Þórhallsdóttir and Ólafsson have theorised this rapid growth in tourism was due to recent events where Iceland received significant media attention. The first of which occurred in 2008, as Iceland economic collapse devaluated its currency making it a less expensive place to travel. The second event was the eruption of Eyjafjallajökull in 2010. Delays and cancellations of flights all over the world, boosted Iceland's international profile. In addition, in the wake of the eruption, the government launch a tourism campaign called Inspired by Iceland. The campaign was run by Promote Iceland and aimed to assure people that Iceland was still a safe place to travel.

=== Education ===
On 13 May 2019, an agreement of mutual recognition of higher education between Iceland and China was signed. The agreement was signed by Lilja Alfreðsdóttir, minister of education and culture in Iceland, and Chen Baosheng, Minister of Education of China. The aim of the agreement was to facilitate student exchanges and strengthen language education. Prior to the agreement, about 30 Icelanders studied abroad in China, and more than 30 Chinese students studied in Iceland every year. The agreement intends to increase access and flow between international universities, as the University of Iceland has entered into exchange program agreements with 15 universities in China.

The University of Iceland has a School of Asian Studies, in which Chinese language courses are offered. In addition, since 2006, the Beijing International Studies University has offered Icelandic language courses.

=== Science ===
In October 2018, the China Iceland Arctic Research Observatory was officially opened. It is a joint project between Aurora Observatory (AO), an Icelandic non-profit foundation, and the Polar Research Institute of China (PRIC). It is located in Kárhóll. Initially, it was intended to be used for aurora and upper atmosphere research. Now, it is also being used to research satellite remote sensing.

=== China Iceland Cultural Fund ===
In 2010, Huang Nubo founded the China Iceland Cultural Fund. The foundation was based in China. Huang was the chairman of the board that consisted of the Icelandic ambassador to China, Kristín A. Árnadóttir, and the director of Beijing University's Poetry Center, Professor Xie Mian. The purpose of the foundation was to support cultural collaborations between the two countries, with particular emphasis on the field of literature. It was intended to operate for 10 years. During this time, Huang guaranteed to contribute US$1 million to the fund. The fund was responsible for hosting several Chinese-Icelandic poetry festivals. These festivals were held in both Iceland and China.

== Geopolitical strategy ==
The Chinese embassy in Reykjavík

=== Embassies ===
In 1995, Iceland opened an embassy in Beijing. This was Iceland's first diplomatic mission in Asia. It is serves as a key base for their diplomatic relations in Asia, as Mongolia, North Korea, South Korea, Cambodia, Laos, Thailand and Vietnam are also all under the jurisdiction of this embassy.

China have an embassy in Iceland. It is four storeys tall, and can hold approximately 500 personnel. There are officially 5 Chinese diplomats accredited to Iceland.

=== 2008 financial crisis ===
In December 2008, during the 2008 financial crisis, Chinese fireworks providers agreed to defer payment for their annual shipment to Reykjavik. This reflected favourably on China, as gamlárskvöld (New Year's Eve) celebrations were able to proceed as scheduled.

China helped Iceland recover from its economic collapse in 2008. Icelandic president, Ólafur Ragnar Grímsson, remarked about geo-political relations towards Iceland during this time, “China and India lent a helping hand to Iceland in many constructive ways, while Europe was unfriendly and the U.S. was absent”.

On June 9, 2010, the Central Bank of Iceland and the People's Bank of China signed a three-year bilateral currency swap agreement. This amounted to over US$480 million. This currency swap was renewed again in 2013 and 2016.

=== Memorandum of understanding ===
In 2012, Iceland was the first stop on Premier Wen Jiabao diplomatic tour of Europe. On 20 April 2012, during his visit, prime minister, Jóhanna Sigurðardóttir, and Premier Jiabao presided over the signing of a memorandum of understanding (MoU) between the two countries. It consisted of the following business and bilateral agreements:

- Framework agreement on Arctic cooperation
- MoU between the Chinese Ministry of Land Resources on Geothermal and Geosciences Cooperation and the Icelandic Foreign Ministry
- Letter of intent between the Government of Iceland and China National Blue Star Group on two projects in Iceland
- Framework agreement between China Petrochemical and Orka Energy Ltd
- Sinopec agreed to join the Expansion of Geothermal Development Scope and Cooperation
- MoU between Promote Iceland and China Development Bank on planning consultancy cooperation

=== The Belt and Road Initiative ===
On 2 February 2018, Jin Zhijian, the Chinese ambassador to Iceland, encouraged Iceland to join the Belt and Road Initiative.

In September 2019, during an official visit to Iceland, U.S. vice president, Mike Pence, congratulated Iceland for rejecting the offer to join the Belt and Road Initiative. He said "the United States is grateful for the stand Iceland took rejecting China's Belt and Road financial investment in Iceland." At this time there has been no official statement released by the Icelandic government about its decision to participate in the Belt and Road Initiative. The Icelandic prime minister, Katrín Jakobsdóttir, corrected the statement made by Vice President Pence. It was stated that the Icelandic government was still considering whether to join the Belt and Road Initiative, but had not yet "opened up for it".

=== Arctic Circle ===
On the same day that the FTA with was signed with China, President Grímsson founded the Arctic Circle. This is a nonprofit and nonpartisan organisation that facilitates dialogue and cooperation around issues of Arctic governance. China was one of the first countries invited to join the organisation.

In May 2019, China held an Arctic Circle Forum in Shanghai. The forum was organised by the Ministry of Natural Resources of the People's Republic of China, in consultation with the Ministry of Foreign Affairs of the People's Republic of China. Significant discussion was directed towards Arctic involvement in the Belt and Road Initiative, as well as renewable energy projects.

=== The Arctic Council ===
On 15 May 2013, China was officially granted observer status of the Arctic Council. There are 8 Arctic states and 13 observer states on this committee. All are allowed to participate in determining the future of policy in the northern polar region.

=== Chinese property investment ===
In August 2011, Chinese real estate developer, Huang Nubo, and the Chinese Investment Group, Zhongkun, offered US$8.8 million to buy 300 square kilometres of Icelandic land. This would have granted them ownership of 0.3% of the country's land mass. The location of interest was a remote, farmland location in northwest of Iceland – Grímsstaðir á Fjöllum. They had planned to invest US$200 million into the area in order to build a luxury hotel, spa and golf resort. This resort was to be linked to two national parks – Vatnajokull and Jokulsargljufur.

The offer was rejected by the government because, under Icelandic law, entities from outside the European Economic Area are prohibited from purchasing land. The Icelandic interior minister, Ögmundur Jónasson and the figure responsible for making the decision, was suspicious of the offer. He stated that “China has been very active in buying up land around the world so we need to be aware of the international ramifications.”

== Energy relations ==
=== Business partnerships ===
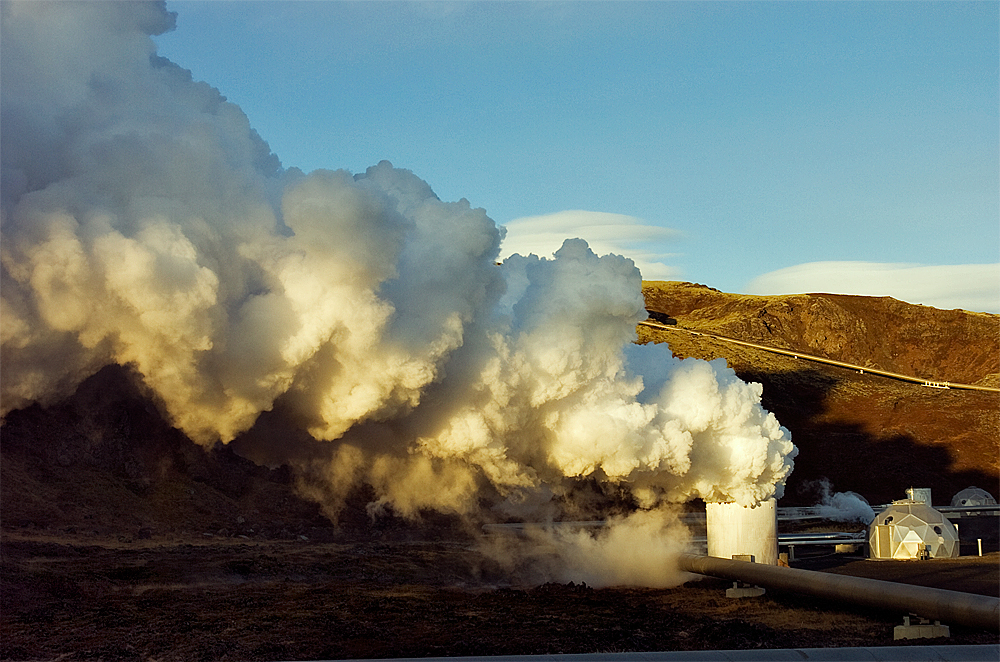
Geothermal power plant in Iceland

In 2006, Iceland's largest geothermal company, Orka Energy, and Sinopec (China Petroleum & Chemical Corporation) partnered in a joint venture called Shaanxi Green Energy Geothermal Development (SGE). Sinopec owned 51% of SGE, and Orka Energy owned 49%. The first project of SGE was to develop a geothermal heating system in Xianyang. The aim was to expand its central heating system by 1500%, reaching 100 million square meters by 2020. In addition, SGE has agreed to future projects in Hebei and Shandong provinces. As of 2019, SGE was the world's largest geothermal district heating company.

In 2010, Geysir Green Energy and Star Petroleum Company (Sinopec subsidiary) signed a framework agreement to establish the Sino-Icelandic Green Energy Geothermal Development Corporation. The goal of this new corporation was to further develop China's geothermal district heating services.

In 2018, the Asian Development Bank loaned US$250 million to the Arctic Green Energy Corporation and Sinopec for the development of geothermal resources in China.

In February 2019, the Beijing Research Institute of Uranium Geology (BRIUG) and Arctic Green Energy signed a MoU that formalised their cooperation in geothermal exploration and application. The MoU had a specific focus on high-temperature geothermal fields in China with the aim of developing projects that allow for electric power generation.

=== Technical education ===
By 2007, Chinese students had participated more than any other nation in the United Nations University Geothermal Training Programs in Reykjavik. In total, approximately 90 students had taken part.

In 2019, the Chinese National Energy Agency and Arctic Green Energy signed a cooperation agreement to begin a geothermal training program in China. The program is operated under the supervision of the National Energy Authority. The program centre is located in Beijing. It accepts up to 150 university educated students a year. In comparison to the United Nations program in Iceland that accepts a maximum of 35 students.

=== Oil and gas ===
In October 2013, China National Offshore Oil Corporation (CNOOC), Eykon Energy and Petoro Iceland agreed upon a joint venture. This allowed them to obtain a license to explore for oil and gas within the Dreki region of the North Atlantic. CNOOC had the majority ownership of the project, as it held a 60% share. In January 2018, CNOOC announced that it would not renew its exploration licence due to insufficient evidence of potential fossil fuels and the hazardous environmental conditions of the area.

Another of site of interest is Gammur. CNOOC has made it evident that it would participate in development bids for the area. However, this is dependent upon government approval. CNOOC is awaiting authorisation that would allow for a strategic environmental assessment of Gammur.
