= De la Garza =

De la Garza is a surname. Notable people with the surname include:

- Alana de la Garza (born 1976), American actress
- Bernardo de la Garza (born 1970), Mexican politician
- Bianca de la Garza, American journalist and television personality
- Carlos de la Garza (1807–1882), Tejano rancher and entrepreneur
- Carlos de la Garza (music producer), 21st century American mixer, record producer, engineer, musician and songwriter
- Eliseo Arredondo de la Garza (1870–1923), Mexican politician and diplomat
- Emeterio de la Garza Jr. (1873–1928), Mexican politician and businessman
- Emilio A. De La Garza (1949–1970), United States Marine Corps lance corporal posthumously awarded the Medal of Honor
- Gabriela de la Garza (born 1976), Mexican actress
- Ignacio de la Garza (1905–?), Mexican footballer
- Jorge Luis de la Garza (born 1981), Mexican politician
- José Antonio de la Garza (1776–1851?), Tejano who was the first landowner in San Antonio, Texas, and mayor of San Antonio
- Juan de la Garza (born 1961), Mexican retired javelin thrower
- Kika de la Garza (1927–2017), American politician and lawyer
- Lucia and Mila de la Garza, half of The Linda Lindas American rock band and daughters of the music producer
- Luis de la Garza (born 1954), Mexican-born American television executive, businessman, community leader and convicted bank robber
- Madison De La Garza (born 2001), American actress and filmmaker
- Mauricio González de la Garza (1923–1995), Mexican journalist, writer and music composer
- Mercedes de la Garza (born 1939), Mexican writer, historian, researcher and academic
- Patricia de la Garza De León (1775–1849), matriarch of one of the prominent founding families of early Texas
- Rodolfo de la Garza (1942–2018), American political scientist
- Rosa María de la Garza (born 1960), Mexican anti-human trafficking activist
- Rosario Ibarra de la Garza (1927–2022), Mexican activist and politician
- Venustiano Carranza de la Garza (1859–1920), Mexican politician and President of Mexico

== See also ==
- A. J. DeLaGarza (born 1987), American soccer player who also played internationally for Guam
- Garza (surname)
