= Garza (surname) =

Garza is a Spanish surname and the Spanish word for the heron. Garza has also become a part of many placenames.

House of Garza

People bearing the name include:

- Aarón Sáenz Garza (1891–1983), Mexican politician
- Ale Garza (born 1977), American comic artist
- Alex Garza (born 1994), American politician
- Alicia Garza (born 1981), American civil rights activist, co-founder Black Lives Matter
- Cayetano Garza (born 1972), American comic designer and illustrator
- Daniel Garza (born 1985), Mexican tennis player
- Daniel "Dani Doom" Garza, member of Design the Skyline
- Ed Garza (born 1969), American politician from Texas
- Emilio M. Garza (born 1947), American jurist
- Eugenio Garza Lagüera (1923–2008), Mexican businessman and philanthropist
- Eugenio Garza Sada (1892–1973), Mexican industrialist and philanthropist
- Jaime Garza (actor) (1954–2021), Mexican actor
- Jaime Garza (boxer) (born 1959), Mexican American boxer
- John Garza (born 1955), American politician
- José Garza, American lawyer and district attorney
- José María Garza Galán (1846–1902), Mexican politician from Coahuila
- Juan Raul Garza (1956–2001), American murderer
- Justin Garza (born 1994), American baseball player
- Lázaro Garza Ayala (1830–1913), Mexican politician from Nuevo León
- Luka Garza (born 1998), American basketball player
- Mariana Garza (born 1970), Mexican singer and actress
- Matt Garza (born 1983), American baseball player
- Mauricio Fernández Garza (born 1950), Mexican politician, businessman and collector
- Manuel Uribe Garza (1965–2014), one of the heaviest people who ever lived
- Pablo González Garza (1879–1950), Mexican general
- Pablo Garza (fighter) (born 1983), American mixed martial arts fighter
- Ralph Garza Jr. (born 1994), American baseball player
- Reynaldo G. Garza (1915–2004), Mexican American jurist
- Roque González Garza (1885–1962), Mexican president
- Tony Garza (born 1959), Mexican-American politician and diplomat
- A family of wrestlers:
  - Héctor Garza (1969–2013), ring name of Héctor Solano Segura; uncle of Angel and Humberto
  - Humberto Garza Carrillo (born 1995), known as Humberto Carrillo
  - Humberto Garza Solano (born 1992), known as Angel Garza
- The three members of American band Los Lonely Boys:
  - Henry Garza (born 1978), guitarist and vocalist
  - Jojo Garza (born 1980), bass player and vocalist
  - Ringo Garza (born 1981), drummer and vocalist

== See also ==
- A. J. DeLaGarza (born 1987), American-born soccer player who also played for Guam
- Garza (disambiguation)
- De la Garza, a list of people with the surname
