= Garza =

Garza may refer to:

- Garza (surname), including a list of people with the surname
- Garza, Santiago del Estero, Argentina, a municipality and village
- Garza County, Texas, United States
- Garza language, an extinct language of Texas and Mexico
- Dante Garza, a Killzone 2 character
- Azar v. Garza, a United States Supreme Court case also known as Garza v. Hargan.
- Garza v. Idaho, a United States Supreme Court case

== See also ==
- De la Garza, a list of people with the surname
