= The Roy Petty Show =

- Genre: Talk radio
- Presented by: Roy Kevin Petty
- Starring: Roy Kevin Petty
- Country of origin: United States
- Original language: Spanish
- No. of seasons: 15

Production
- Production location: Dallas
- Running time: 60 minutes

Original release
- Network: Univision America
- Release: 1 November 1999 – present

The Roy Petty Show, also called Hora Legal con el Abogado Roy Petty, is a Spanish language daily television and radio show which first aired nationally on TeleAmerica television in November 1999. The program is hosted by criminal and immigration defense attorney Roy Petty. Roy Petty served on the defense team for Dairo Antonio Úsuga, the former leader of the Clan del Golfo known as Otoniel, and his extended family. Since June 2010, the show has been cohosted by Univision television personality Reyna Cavasos. The show was created by the Hispanic community leader Luis de la Garza to follow his Foro 44 program. The show moved to Univision in November 2002; and it changed to a radio format in May 2012 when it began airing on Univision America radio. It was also broadcast on KTNO radio in Dallas.

== Premise ==
This series is a lively and informative talk show which features the criminal and immigration defense attorney Roy Petty who answers caller questions about legal matters, principally immigration and consumer advocacy. Roy Petty was a civil rights lawyer in Chicago and Washington, DC. The show's "Scams Exposed!" segment has led to judgments and criminal prosecutions against con artists who have defrauded immigrants. In March 2005, the show exposed a multimillion-dollar document fraud scam orchestrated by an undocumented Mexican Fidelina Cuevas. In 2013, the Roy Petty Show exposed fraud which led to a civil fraud judgment against Mundo Latino of Dallas and Cecilia McDaniel. As a result of the investigation, Mundo Latino filed for bankruptcy and shut down.

In September 2008, Roy Petty won a court judgment overturning the prohibition on granting citizenship to immigrants with recent DWI convictions. The court found that immigration officials must follow the law and cannot invent rules that Congress has not authorized.

The Roy Petty Show broadcasts a weekly segment for victims of domestic violence and advises victims how to leave abusive relationships and how to obtain a U visa and legal status as the victim of crime. Another weekly segment teaches traditional values such as paying taxes, obeying traffic laws, and respecting law enforcement including immigration officers.
