= Möðrudalur =

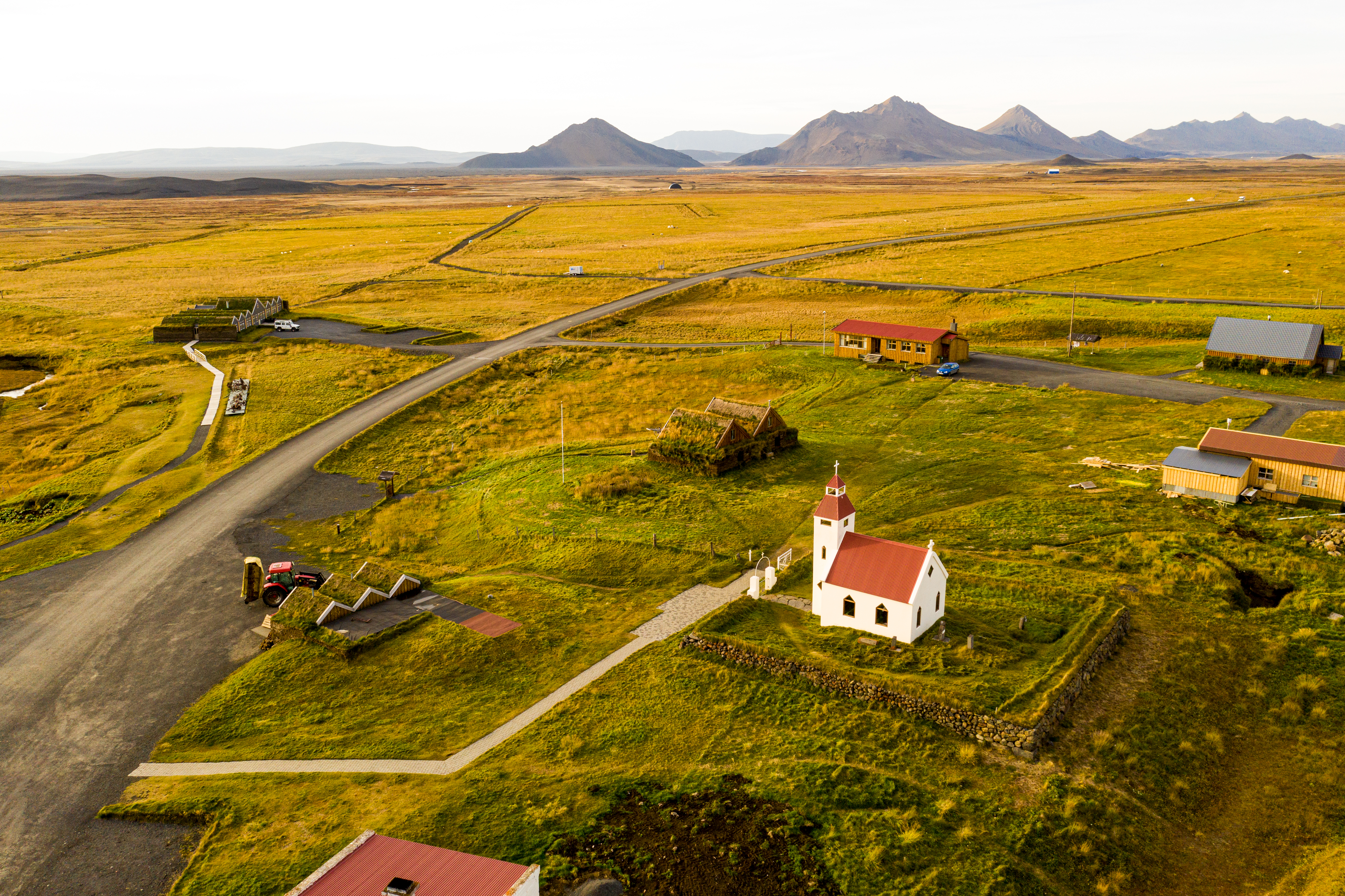

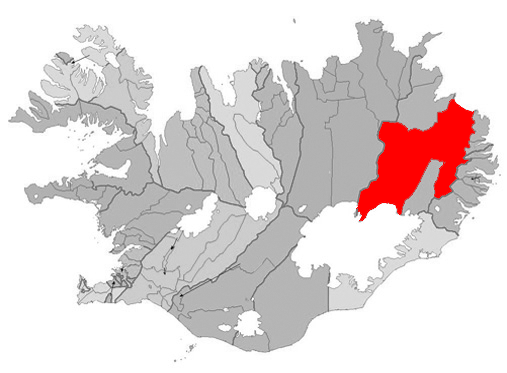
- Location of the Municipality of Fljótsdalshérað

- Location of Möðrudalur in Iceland
- Coordinates: 65°22′27″N 15°53′3.7″W
- Country: Iceland
- Constituency: Northeast Constituency
- Region: Eastern Region
- Municipality: Múlaþing
- Elevation: 469 m (1,539 ft)

Möðrudalur (Icelandic pronunciation: [ˈmœðrʏˌtaːlʏr̥]) is a farm settlement in Norður-Múlasýsla in Eastern Iceland, and the highest inhabited place in the country, at 469 m (1,539 ft) above sea level.

Möðrudalur is a popular tourist destination, and was formerly located on The Ring Road until the road was moved to its current Háreksstaðaleið route to the north of Möðrudalur.

A church was built in Möðrudalur in 1949 by Jón A. Stefánsson. A guesthouse, a small store and a restaurant are operated in the area. Nearby the settlement one finds also the Kunsthalle Tropical.

== Climate ==
The lowest temperature ever recorded in Iceland, -38.0 °C (-36.4 °F) was recorded concurrently in Möðrudalur and the neighboring Grímsstaðir on 21 January 1918.

Climate data for Möðrudalur, 1990–2009 normals (452 m)
Month	Jan	Feb	Mar	Apr	May	Jun	Jul	Aug	Sep	Oct	Nov	Dec	Year
Record high °C (°F)	10.4 (50.7)	9.7 (49.5)	12.0 (53.6)	18.6 (65.5)	19.5 (67.1)	23.0 (73.4)	26.0 (78.8)	26.0 (78.8)	21.7 (71.1)	15.1 (59.2)	14.7 (58.5)	13.8 (56.8)	26.0 (78.8)
Mean daily maximum °C (°F)	−0.7 (30.7)	−1.2 (29.8)	−0.8 (30.6)	1.6 (34.9)	6.6 (43.9)	11.0 (51.8)	13.6 (56.5)	13.0 (55.4)	8.5 (47.3)	3.0 (37.4)	0.5 (32.9)	−0.9 (30.4)	4.5 (40.1)
Daily mean °C (°F)	−4.4 (24.1)	−4.8 (23.4)	−4.0 (24.8)	−1.6 (29.1)	3.1 (37.6)	7.0 (44.6)	9.3 (48.7)	8.8 (47.8)	5.0 (41.0)	0.1 (32.2)	−2.8 (27.0)	−4.3 (24.3)	1.0 (33.7)
Mean daily minimum °C (°F)	−8.6 (16.5)	−8.6 (16.5)	−7.9 (17.8)	−5.0 (23.0)	−0.2 (31.6)	3.2 (37.8)	5.6 (42.1)	4.9 (40.8)	1.9 (35.4)	−3.0 (26.6)	−6.7 (19.9)	−8.3 (17.1)	−2.7 (27.1)
Record low °C (°F)	−30.5 (−22.9)	−33.0 (−27.4)	−28.5 (−19.3)	−27.5 (−17.5)	−10.7 (12.7)	−6.6 (20.1)	−0.6 (30.9)	−4.6 (23.7)	−13.2 (8.2)	−22.0 (−7.6)	−28.0 (−18.4)	−32.2 (−26.0)	−33.0 (−27.4)
Average precipitation mm (inches)	24.1 (0.95)	21.5 (0.85)	22.0 (0.87)	17.2 (0.68)	20.5 (0.81)	24.0 (0.94)	38.6 (1.52)	42.1 (1.66)	33.3 (1.31)	35.4 (1.39)	29.8 (1.17)	25.6 (1.01)	334.1 (13.16)
Source: Icelandic Meteorological Office

== Gallery ==
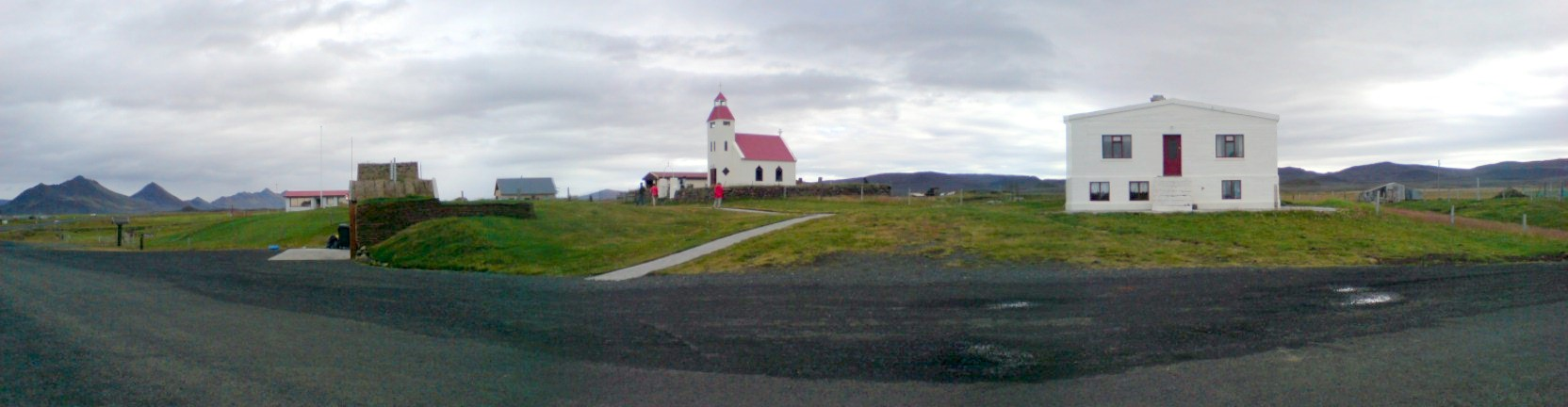
Panorama of the settlement at Möðrudalur.
