= Ignacio de la Garza =

Mexican footballer (1905–?)

Personal information
- Date of birth: 1905
- Position: Goalkeeper

International career
Years	Team	Apps	(Gls)
1923	Mexico	6	(0)

Ignacio de la Garza (born 1905, date of death unknown) was a Mexican footballer who played as a goalkeeper. He made six appearances for the Mexico national team in 1923. He was also part of Mexico's squad for the football tournament at the 1928 Summer Olympics, but he did not play in any matches.
