= Grímsstaðir =

- Village
- Location of Grímsstaðir in Iceland
- Coordinates: 65°38′32″N 16°7′13″W
- Country: Iceland
- Constituency: Northeast Constituency
- Region: Northeastern Region
- Municipality: Norðurþing
- Time zone: UTC+0 (GMT)

Grímsstaðir (Icelandic pronunciation: [ˈkrimsˌstaːðɪr̥]) is a settlement in north-east Iceland whose weather station has recorded the low-temperature record for Iceland of -38°C. This temperature was also recorded concurrently in the neighbouring settlement of Möðrudalur on 21 January 1918. It is a sheltered location (at altitude of about 400 metres) between two upland areas (above 800 metres).

It is situated just off Route 1 (the main ring road around the island), where it crosses the large river Jökulsá á Fjöllum, about 37 km or 23 miles east of Lake Mývatn. The river was bridged in 1947: before that, traffic between north and east Iceland had to use a ferry.

Currently the settlement has some accommodation for tourists, with discussions for growth. It also has an airstrip, in common with many isolated rural settlements in Iceland. It is a recognised stop on the bus route between Akureyri and Egilsstaðir (up to one bus per day in summer) although it is only during summer that the buses venture off the main road to the settlement itself.

== Climate ==
Grímsstaðir features a tundra climate (Köppen climate classification: ET) due to being located in the uplands at some altitude. It is also close to a subarctic climate (Köppen climate classification: Dfc).

Climate data for Grímsstaðir 1991–2020 normals, extremes 1949–present (384 m)
Month	Jan	Feb	Mar	Apr	May	Jun	Jul	Aug	Sep	Oct	Nov	Dec	Year
Record high °C (°F)	11.5 (52.7)	10.9 (51.6)	11.0 (51.8)	19.8 (67.6)	21.6 (70.9)	24.8 (76.6)	27.2 (81.0)	27.4 (81.3)	22.5 (72.5)	15.6 (60.1)	13.5 (56.3)	12.0 (53.6)	27.4 (81.3)
Mean daily maximum °C (°F)	−0.7 (30.7)	−0.8 (30.6)	−0.3 (31.5)	2.4 (36.3)	7.1 (44.8)	12.1 (53.8)	14.3 (57.7)	13.4 (56.1)	9.3 (48.7)	3.7 (38.7)	0.5 (32.9)	−0.8 (30.6)	5.0 (41.0)
Daily mean °C (°F)	−3.8 (25.2)	−4.1 (24.6)	−3.4 (25.9)	−0.9 (30.4)	3.2 (37.8)	7.6 (45.7)	9.6 (49.3)	8.7 (47.7)	5.5 (41.9)	0.8 (33.4)	−2.2 (28.0)	−3.9 (25.0)	1.4 (34.5)
Mean daily minimum °C (°F)	−7.7 (18.1)	−7.7 (18.1)	−6.9 (19.6)	−4.0 (24.8)	−0.3 (31.5)	3.4 (38.1)	5.7 (42.3)	4.8 (40.6)	2.4 (36.3)	−2.1 (28.2)	−6.0 (21.2)	−7.7 (18.1)	−2.2 (28.0)
Record low °C (°F)	−38.0 (−36.4)	−26.1 (−15.0)	−30.0 (−22.0)	−26.0 (−14.8)	−16.4 (2.5)	−6.5 (20.3)	−3.3 (26.1)	−5.1 (22.8)	−13.1 (8.4)	−19.2 (−2.6)	−26.6 (−15.9)	−29.2 (−20.6)	−38.0 (−36.4)
Average precipitation mm (inches)	27.1 (1.07)	22.1 (0.87)	23.2 (0.91)	18.5 (0.73)	25.5 (1.00)	28.8 (1.13)	49.8 (1.96)	44.5 (1.75)	46.5 (1.83)	41.1 (1.62)	34.8 (1.37)	28.4 (1.12)	390.3 (15.37)
Average precipitation days (≥ 1.0 mm)	8.0	7.1	7.0	5.7	6.5	7.3	10.4	9.7	10.1	10.0	9.3	8.6	99.7
Average snowy days (≥ 0 cm)	23.9	19.5	22.5	15.0	4.5	0.3	0.0	0.0	1.2	6.2	16.8	23.0	132.9
Source 1: Icelandic Met Office
Source 2: NOAA
