= Coyhaique Alto =

- Location within Chile
- Coordinates: 45°28′S 71°33′W
- Country: Chile
- Region: Aysén
- Province: Coyhaique
- Elevation: 728 m (2,388 ft)
- Time zone: UTC−04:00 (Chilean Standard (CLT))
  - Summer (DST): UTC−04:00 (Time does not change in Coyhaique)
- Climate: Csc

Coyhaique Alto is a Chilean frontier complex located in Aysén Region.

== Climate ==
The climate is subpolar oceanic (Csc/Dsc), with very cool summers and cold winters. In June 2002, it registered -37 °C, the coldest official temperature of South America.

Climate data for Coyhaique Alto (1994–2011)
Month	Jan	Feb	Mar	Apr	May	Jun	Jul	Aug	Sep	Oct	Nov	Dec	Year
Mean daily maximum °C (°F)	17.4 (63.3)	19.5 (67.1)	16.1 (61.0)	11.9 (53.4)	9.1 (48.4)	5.5 (41.9)	4.9 (40.8)	6.7 (44.1)	9.2 (48.6)	11.3 (52.3)	13.3 (55.9)	16.0 (60.8)	11.7 (53.1)
Daily mean °C (°F)	11.7 (53.1)	12.6 (54.7)	9.7 (49.5)	6.2 (43.2)	3.7 (38.7)	0.3 (32.5)	0.0 (32.0)	1.8 (35.2)	4.2 (39.6)	6.5 (43.7)	8.3 (46.9)	10.6 (51.1)	6.3 (43.3)
Mean daily minimum °C (°F)	5.9 (42.6)	5.6 (42.1)	3.3 (37.9)	0.4 (32.7)	−1.7 (28.9)	−4.9 (23.2)	−4.9 (23.2)	−3.2 (26.2)	−0.8 (30.6)	1.7 (35.1)	3.2 (37.8)	5.2 (41.4)	0.8 (33.5)
Average precipitation mm (inches)	15 (0.6)	10 (0.4)	16 (0.6)	31 (1.2)	39 (1.5)	30 (1.2)	43 (1.7)	38 (1.5)	15 (0.6)	15 (0.6)	16 (0.6)	19 (0.7)	290 (11.4)
Source: Atlas Agroclimatico de Chile
