= Mauricio González de la Garza =

Mexican journalist, writer and music composer

Mauricio González de la Garza (October 6, 1923 – July 2, 1996) was a Mexican journalist, writer and music composer.

== Life and career ==
Mauricio González de la Garza was born in Nuevo Laredo, Tamaulipas, Mexico on October 6, 1923.

His parents were Josefina de la Garza de los Santos and Mauricio González Hinojosa. Mauricio was the third of five siblings. The family suffered a big tragedy on April 1934 when the father died from rabbies. Her mother then started to operate a Money Exchange business to support her children.

Mauricio studied at St Agustin School and then at the Laredo College. In 1950 he emigrated to Mexico City to study medicine. After a year he quit and started his studies of Philosophy at the University of Mexico (UNAM).

Mauricio worked as an editor and translator and in 1953 he started therapy session with the most renowned psychoanalyst of the time: Santiago Ramirez. In 1958 Mauricio secluded himself in the Monastery of Santa de la Resurreccion in Ahuacatitaln, Morelos. He stayed there for almost 5 years. During this time he conducted therapy sessions with some of the monks. The use of psychoanalysis at the monastery became very famous after it the Abbot gave an interview to Paris Match and Life magazines.

In 1962, Mauricio traveled to New York where he worked at the Modern Language Materials Development Center. At the center he co-author levels 3 and 4 of the Texts Books dedicated to Teach Spanish as a Foreign Language.

In 1967 Mauricio published his first novel El Rio de la Misericordia. Later he wrote El Padre Prior in which he recounts his life at the monastery. Mauricio started to write OP Eds at different Mexican news papers. By the 1970 he was contributing on a daily basis in different news papers in the country, like Diario de Monterrey, la Voz de Michoacan y El Ciudadano de Nuevo Laredo. He became very famous with his column Mauricio Dice. His column was part of a nationally syndicated news paper: Excelsior.

In 1981 Mauricio published Ultimate Lla made. A political essay that had 26 reprints and sold more than a million books. In this essay Mauricio criticized the Partido Revolucionario Institucional and for the first time in Mexico he wrote against the president Jose Lopez Portillo.

Mauricio was forced to leave the country and he self exile in Falfurrias, Texas. Later, when he came back to Mexico he wrote OPEDs in the 73 news papers of the group Organization Editorial Mexicana.

He wrote more than 15,000 articles during his life.

Mauricio also wrote and registered more than 40 songs. One of them became the theme of the Telenovela El amor llego mas tarde. The song, Polvo enamorado, was later recorded by Josh Jose.

== Bibliography ==
Mauricio also wrote several short stories and poems. He published the following books

- Río de la misericordia (Fiction, Published in 1967)
- Wahtl Whitman, racista, antimperialista, antimexicano ( Essay, published in 1971)
- El Padre Prior (Fiction,Published in 1971)
- Rey de oros (Fiction,Published in 1972)
- Abel o Purgatorio de Amor (Fiction, 1977)
- Última Llamada(Political Essay, published in 1981)
- Carta abierta a Miguel de la Madrid, con copia a los mexicanos (Political Essay, 1988)
- El milagro azul (Fcition, 988)
- México rumbo a México (Political Essay, 1993)
- De Puebla los Fulgores (Essay about Puebla 1995)
- Soneto (Fiction, 1990)
- Essay about Walt Whitman
