= Tha Ngon =

- Village
- Location within Laos
- Coordinates: 18°07′53″N 102°37′32″E
- Country: Laos
- Province: Vientiane Prefecture
- Time zone: UTC+7 (Laos Standard Time)

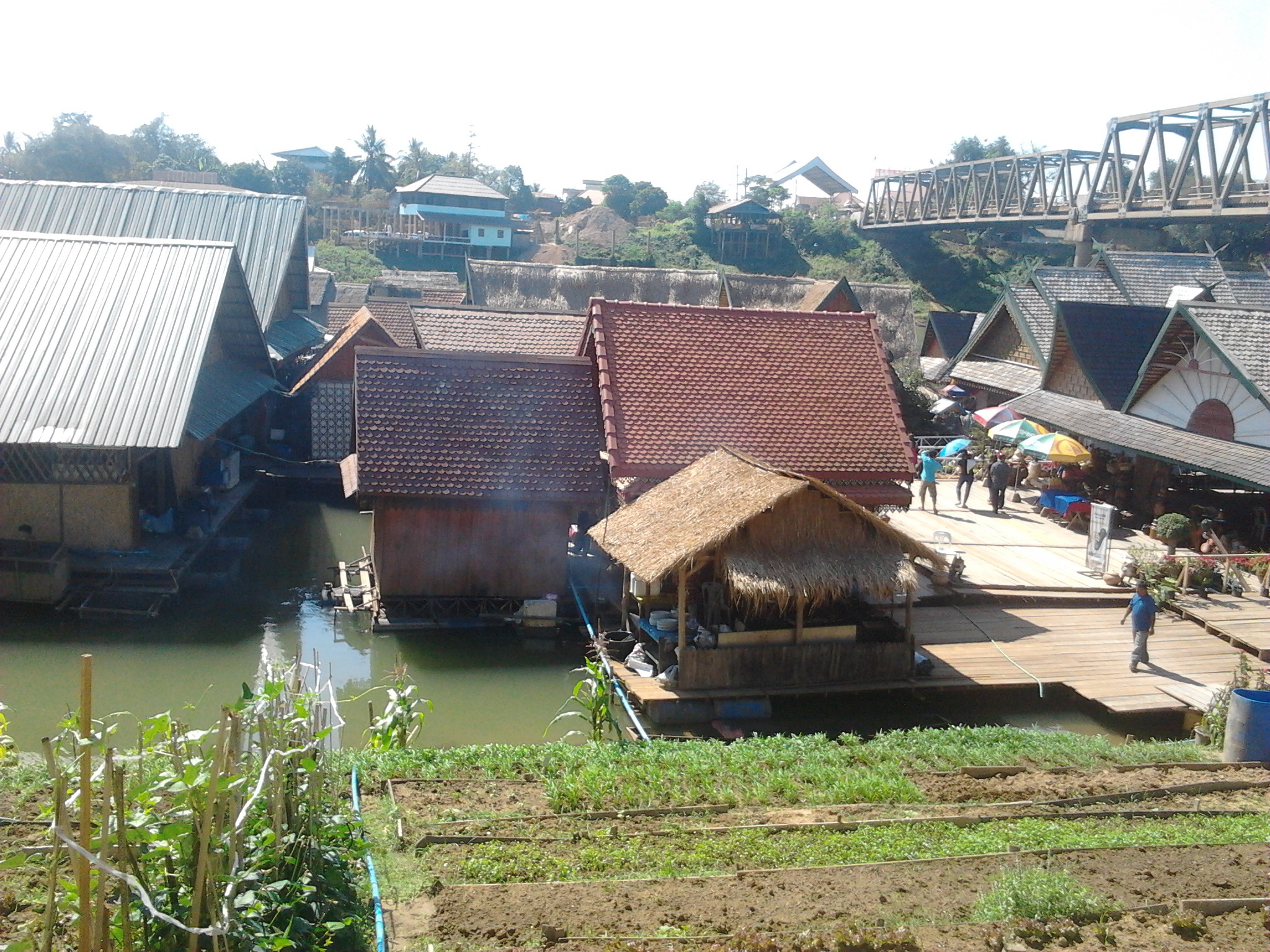

Tha Ngon is a village in Vientiane Prefecture, Laos, It lies just north of the city of Vientiane and just to the south of the Nam Ngum River.
