= Geysir Green Energy =

Icelandic energy company

Geysir Green Energy is an Icelandic energy company. It is part-owned by Atorka, Íslandsbanki, VGK-Invest and Reykjanesbæjar and specializes in projects related to geothermal energy production and maximising potential in low-temperature areas. Geysir Green Energy was established on 5 January 2007, and on 30 April 2007 the company purchased a 15.2% stake in Hitaveita Suðurnesja for 7.6 billion króna. Among the major projects of the company is ENEX, a subsidiary which develops power plants that use geothermal energy. Enex-China is a joint project between Enex and the Chinese Shaanxi Geothermal Energy Development Corporation. The company also owns stake in Ram Power Inc., which is involved in the development of geothermal energy in the United States.
