= Luis de la Garza =

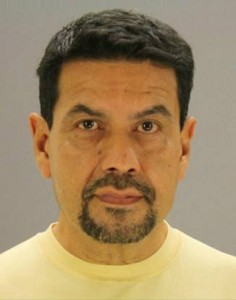
- Luis de la Garza
- Born: May 20, 1954 (age 72); Mexico City, Mexico
- Education: Universidad Autonoma de Mexico; Instituto Politécnico Nacional
- Occupations: in prison for Bank Robber, ex Businessman and radio talk show host, community leader, etc...
- Spouse: Blanca Estrada

Luis de la Garza (born May 20, 1954 in Mexico City, Mexico) is currently in prison arrested by the FBI for bank robbery. used to be a television executive, businessman, and community leader in Texas. He is the recipient of numerous community awards for his personal success in business and media, as well as for his efforts to assist other Mexican-American entrepreneurs to start their own businesses. To the shock of his family and many who have worked with him, de la Garza was arrested by the FBI for being a serial bank robber on June 22, 2013. He subsequently pleaded guilty to bank robbery charges and is currently serving a 20-year federal prison sentence in Seagoville, TX.

== Background ==
De la Garza obtained his bachelor's degree in geology from the Instituto Politécnico Nacional and his master's degree in hydrogeology from the Universidad Nacional Autónoma de México. He subsequently worked for the Mexican government and was responsible for detecting, studying, and drilling for water with a team of 600 under his command. At the peak of his career, he married and moved to Houston, Texas. Unable to work within his field of expertise due to a language barrier, de la Garza earned his living performing manual labor. Soon after, he divorced and moved to Dallas, where he became a successful entrepreneur in the restaurant and automobile businesses.

== TeleAmerica ==
In the mid-eighties, de la Garza was invited to host a radio show and developed a new passion for media. In 1994, de la Garza founded TeleAmerica a Spanish-speaking television station serving the Hispanic community giving them a venue to open express their opinion to. A couple of years later it became TeleAmerica Spanish Network, broadcasting to different states through independent stations but still under the TeleAmerica logo.

By then, de la Garza had become politically active within the Hispanic community and his Show Foro 44 on KLEG-LP had made a name for itself. The show largely focused on local issues, including education, health, business, and regional politics. In December 1999, after seeing the need for an immigration and consumer advocacy advice program, he produced The Roy Petty Show until 2002 when it moved to Univision America. De la Garza became active in American politics, meeting with numerous Senators and Congressmen, peacefully protesting against laws which he viewed as anti-immigrant, and conducting community organizing activities in Mexican neighborhoods.

== Awards and other ventures ==
De la Garza has been the recipient of many community awards. He was twice named one of the most influential media personalities by the advocacy group Hispanic 100. He has also received recognition from the Latino Peace Officers Association, Who’s Talking (issued by The Dallas Morning News as one of the best Talk Shows), the Venegas Foundation, the Arlington Hispanic Advisory Council, the League of United Latin American Citizens and the Dallas Police Department.

In 2006, de la Garza began efforts to found a new television station while continuing to host his radio show ConSentido. He also stayed active in business, founding a new organization, RETO Group/Representacion Total, which aimed to strengthen ties between business people in Mexico and the United States in order to create new opportunities for development and investment. Throughout his efforts in business and political advocacy, de la Garza expressed that he aimed to build bridges between Mexicans in Mexico and the United States and that the only way to effect change is to participate, be active, and create opportunities for future generations.

== Bank robbery arrest, guilty plea and sentencing ==
On June 22, 2013, de la Garza was arrested by the FBI and charged with the April 22 robbery of a Wells Fargo bank in Farmers Branch, Texas, during which the perpetrator covered his face with a mask as he entered the location and demanded money from the tellers at gunpoint. According to The Dallas Morning News, a witness who saw the robber prior to his putting on the mask described the robber's features to police, who created a sketch that was widely distributed. The sketch helped lead police to de la Garza, whom a witness later pointed out from a lineup. Agents from the FBI Bank Robbery Task Force identified de la Garza as the "Mesh Mask Bandit", who was believed to have been involved in nearly 20 bank robberies since December 2012.

De la Garza's wife and people who worked with him expressed shock at the arrest, although others who know him stated that de la Garza had a gambling addiction. In addition, The Dallas Morning News reported that he had legal problems in the past. He pleaded guilty in 2005 to failing to file a corporate tax return and was ordered to pay about $72,000 to the IRS.

In November 2013, de la Garza pleaded guilty to committing robberies at five banks in the Dallas-Fort Worth area between April 2010 and May 2013. He also confessed to committing more than a dozen other bank robberies since 2010. He was sentenced to 20 years in federal prison on April 17, 2014, and is currently being held at the Federal Correctional Institution, Seagoville, a low-security facility in Texas. He is scheduled for release in 2030.
