= Huang Nubo =

Chinese businessman

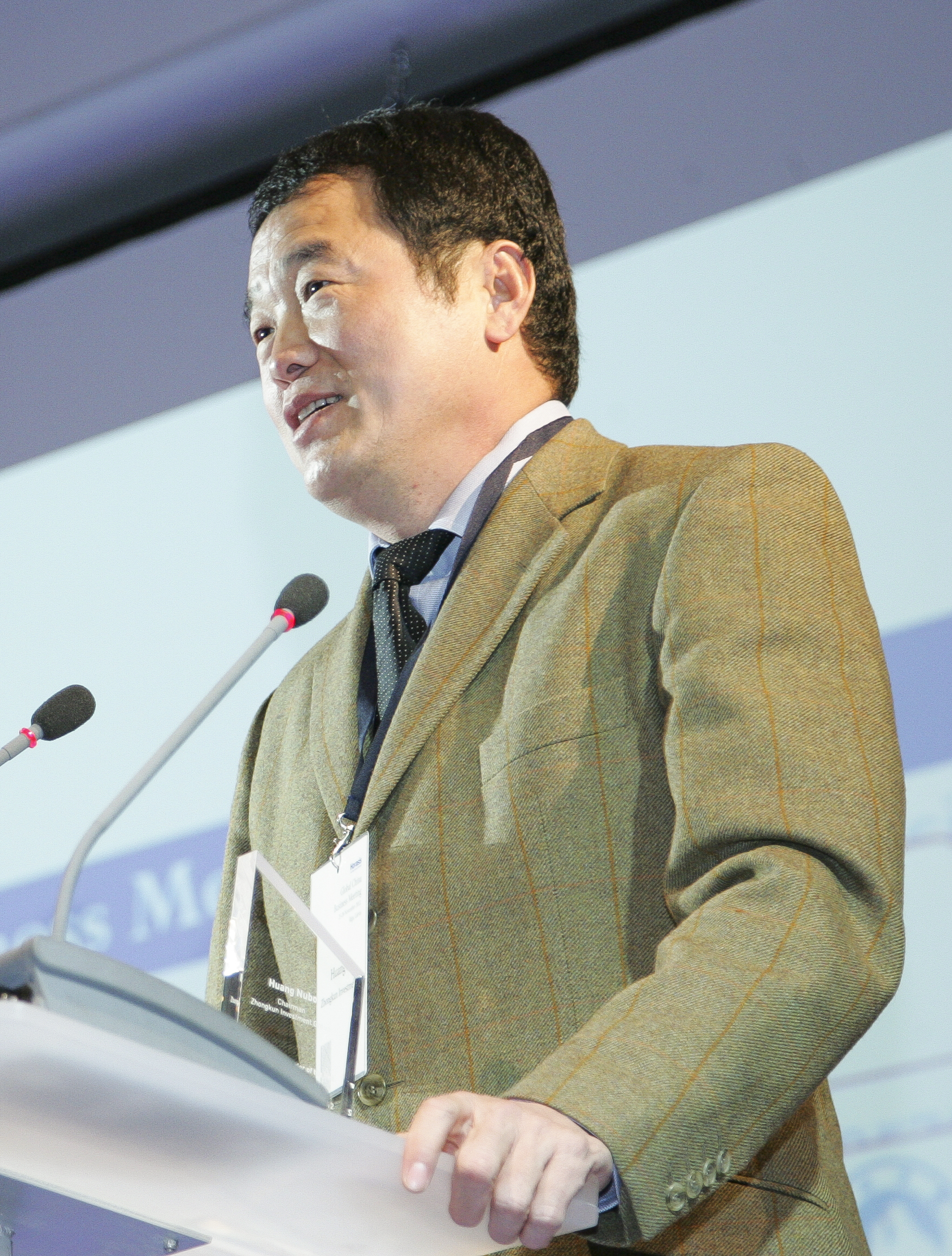
- Huang Nubo at the Horasis Global China Business Meeting in 2012
- Born: 1956 (age 69–70); Lanzhou
- Education: Peking University (BLit); China Europe International Business School (MBA)
- Occupation: Chairman of Beijing Zhongkun Investment Group
- Political party: Chinese Communist Party
- Children: Huang, Sichen

Huang Nubo (Chinese: 黄怒波; born 1956) is a Chinese real estate developer, entrepreneur, poet, and mountaineer who founded and remains Chairman of Beijing Zhongkun Investment Group. According to Hurun Report, his net worth is US$2.3 billion as of 2014, ranking 90th among the 400 richest Chinese.

Born in Lanzhou, Gansu province, Huang grew up in Yinchuan, Ningxia. From 1977 to 1981, he studied at Peking University's Chinese Language department, receiving a bachelor's degree. From 1981 to 1990, Huang worked in the Publicity Department of the Chinese Communist Party. From 1996 to 1998, he studied for his Executive Master of Business Administration, which he received from the China Europe International Business School (CEIBS).

In August 2011, Huang caused a stir in Iceland when he proposed to buy 300 kilometres (190 mi) of the island, encompassing 0.3% of the country, to develop a $200 million property with a "120-room hotel, airport, golf course and horse-riding facilities." The proposal was met with skepticism in Iceland.

Currently, he is the chairman of Beijing Zhongkun Investment Group, director of the Chinese Poetry Association (Chinese: 中国诗歌学会), and vice-president of the Chinese Mountaineers Society (Chinese: 中国登山协会).

Huang has given over 1 billion renminbi to charity.
