= Rossana Chahla =

Argentine politician

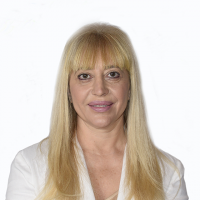

Mayor of San Miguel de Tucumán
- Incumbent
- Assumed office 28 October 2023
- Preceded by: Germán Alfaro

National Deputy
- In office 10 December 2021 – 28 October 2023
- Succeeded by: Elia Mansilla

Minister of Public Health of Tucumán Province
- In office 29 October 2015 – 7 December 2021
- Governor: Juan Manzur
- Preceded by: Pablo Yedlin
- Succeeded by: Luis Medina Ruiz

Personal details
- Born: Rossana Elena Chahla; 3 April 1966 (age 60) San Miguel de Tucumán, Argentina
- Party: Justicialist Party
- Other political affiliations: Peronist Loyalty; Frente de Todos (2019–2023); Unión por la Patria (2023–present)
- Spouse: Marcelo San Pedro
- Children: 3
- Parent(s): Elías Chahla; Amelia Testa
- Education: Doctorate in Medicine (Gynaecology); Master in Medical Education; Diploma in Direction of Health Systems
- Alma mater: National University of Tucumán
- Occupation: Gynaecologist
- Website: rossanachahla.com.ar

Rossana Elena Chahla (born 3 April 1966) is an Argentine gynaecologist and politician. A member of the Justicialist Party, she has been serving as Mayor of San Miguel de Tucumán since 2023, the first woman to hold the office. She was previously a National Deputy from 2021 to 2023 representing Tucumán Province for the Frente de Todos and, before that, the Public Health Minister of Tucumán Province between 2015 and 2019.

As a physician, she specialized in reproductive medicine, colposcopy, obstetrics and public health and is a titular professor of the chair of Gynaecology of the National University of Tucumán, a fellow of the American College of Obstetricians and Gynecologists since 2011 and a member of the European Society of Human Reproduction and Embryology. She was President of the Society of Gynaecology and Obstetrics of Tucumán between 2000 and 2002 and Director of the Institute of Maternity and Gynaecology "Nuestra Señora de las Mercedes" between 2003 and 2015.

== Background and education ==
Rossana was born in San Miguel de Tucumán on 3 April 1966 to businessman Elías Chahla, son of a Syriac Orthodox Syrian immigrant from Homs who was himself married to a Maronite Lebanese woman from Beirut, and Amelia Testa, an Italian from Liguria. Rossana was raised Roman Catholic. She completed her primary and secondary studies at the Colegio Nuestra Señora del Huerto in her birth city. She got her license and doctorate in medicine from the National University of Tucumán.

== Political career ==
After taking up the governorship of Tucumán in 2015, Juan Manzur appointed Chahla as provincial Minister of Public Health after having positively evaluated her direction in the Institute of Maternity and Gynaecology, which Chahla had been carrying out since November 2003. During her tenure in the ministry, a discussion for the decriminalization of abortion in Argentina took place, which she did not support.

She headed the list of candidates for national deputies of the Frente de Todos for Tucumán in the legislative elections of 2021, being seconded by Agustín Fernández. In them, she obtained the first place with 42.15% of the votes, winning in all the departments of the province except Capital, Chicligasta and Yerba Buena. The competing lists of Juntos por el Cambio and Fuerza Republicana obtained 39.94% and 10.48% respectively of the votes in those same elections.

In the provincial elections of 2023, she was the candidate of the provincial ruling party on the list "Peronist Loyalty" for the municipality of San Miguel de Tucumán, then incumbed by the opposition Germán Alfaro. Despite being one of the three districts where Chahla had lost in the 2021 legislative elections, she won against the opposition candidate Beatriz Ávila (National Senator and spouse of Alfaro) by 6,205 votes, according to the final count of votes. The seat which she occupied in Congress, with a mandate until 2025, will be occupied by Elia Fernández de Mansilla, mayor of the municipality of Aguilares.

== Personal life ==
She is married to Marcelo San Pedro, who works in the sale of scientific equipment, and has three children. She has a sister named María Emilia Chahla, with whom she is often mentioned in the press in relation to an ongoing filiation lawsuit initiated in 1999 by Ángel Eduardo Páez, who claims to share her biological father. Rossana is not opposed to marriage equality.

== Academic works ==
- "Análisis por series temporales de la incidencia de varicela y el impacto de la implementación de la vacuna en Tucumán." Chahla, Rossana and others (Ministerio de Salud de la Nación, 2020–08)
- "Caracterización de los accidentes de tránsito en un hospital público de San Miguel de Tucumán y su relación con una campaña de prevención, período 2017 - 2018." Chahla, Rossana and others (Gobierno de la Provincia de Tucuman. Ministerio de Salud Pública, 2019–10)
- "Changes in vascular function and autonomic balance during the first trimester of pregnancy and its relationship with the new-born weight" Chahla, Rossana and others (Informa Healthcare, 2021–08)
- "Convalescent Plasma Therapy in SARS-COV-2 Infection, Experience in Tucumán Argentina: An Observational Study." Chahla, Rossana and others (Frontiers in Mecial Case Reports, 2021–06)
- "Evento Epidemiological surveillance of Sars-Cov-2 occurrence in wastewater from Gran San Miguel de Tucumán, Argentina." Chahla, Rossana and others (Fundación Revista Medicina, 2021)
- "Evaluación de variables cardiovasculares en una población calchaquí de media y alta montaña de Tucumán." Chahla, Rossana and others (Sociedad Argentina de Cardiología, 2021–04)
- "Hipertensión arterial como factor de riesgo mayor en la prevalencia de accidente cerebrovascular e infarto agudo de miocardio en la provincia de Tucumán." Chahla, Rossana and others (Provincia de Tucumán. Ministerio de Salud Pública, 2017–08)
- "Marcadores tempranos hemodinámicos y bioquímicos para riesgo metabólico en niños con antecedentes de retardo de crecimiento intrauterino." Chahla, Rossana and others (Ministerio de Salud Publica de Tucuman, 2020–04)
- "El ovocito desde la ovogénesis hasta la ovulación" in Tratado de reproducción humana: Fisiopatología, fertilización asistida, reprogenética y aplicaciones clínicas. Chahla, Rossana and others (Ascune, 2020)
- "Vascular Function in Children with Low Birthweight and Its Relationship with Early Markers of Cardiovascular Risk." Chahla, Rossana and others (Karger, 2016–07)

== Electoral history ==
=== Executive ===
Electoral history of Rossana Chahla
Election	Office	List	Votes			Result	Ref.
Election	Office	List	Total	%	P.	Result	Ref.
2023	Mayor of San Miguel de Tucumán	Front of All for Tucumán	158,564	41.96%	1st	Elected	

=== Legislative ===
Electoral history of Marcela Fabiana Passo
Election	Office	List	#	District	Votes			Result	Ref.
Election	Office	List	#	District	Total	%	P.	Result	Ref.
2021	National Deputy	Frente de Todos	1	Tucumán Province	408,245	42.18%	1st (Note: Presented on an electoral list. The data shown represents the share of the vote the entire party/alliance received in that constituency.)	Elected	
