= Agustín Fernández (politician) =

Argentine politician

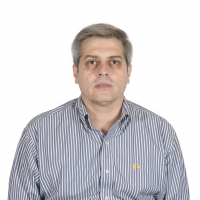

National Deputy
- In office 10 December 2021 – 10 December 2025

Personal details
- Born: March 16, 1967 (age 59) Aguilares, Argentina
- Party: Justicialist Party

Agustín Fernández (born 16 March 1967) is an Argentine realtor and politician. He served as a member of the Argentine Chamber of Deputies for Tucumán Province from 2021 to 2025 and chaired the Independencia parliamentary bloc. He previously served as mayor of Aguilares from 2003 to 2015 and as secretary of justice of Tucumán Province from 2020 to 2021.

== Political career ==
His political career began in 2003, when he was elected mayor of Aguilares. He was reelected in 2007 and 2011. His final term ended in 2015, when he was succeeded by Peronist politician Elia Fernández de Mansilla.

In 2020, he briefly served as secretary of justice in the government of Tucumán Province. In 2021, he contested the 2021 Argentine legislative election as a Justicialist Party candidate for the Argentine Chamber of Deputies, alongside Rossana Chahla. They were elected with 42.18% of the vote.

In January 2024, Fernández attracted controversy after first signing the committee report supporting President Javier Milei's Bases Law. He subsequently formed the Independencia parliamentary bloc with deputies from Tucumán Province aligned with Osvaldo Jaldo, breaking away from the Union for the Homeland bloc to support Milei's government.

=== Controversies ===
In November 2021, during the legislative election campaign, officials from PRO's Tucumán branch filed a criminal complaint against candidates from the Frente de Todos, including Fernández, over alleged irregularities involving the distribution of provincial subsidies before the election.
