= Agustín Fernández =

Agustín Fernández may refer to:

- Agustín Fernández (artist) (1928–2006), Cuban artist
- Agustín Fernández (footballer) (born 1982), Spanish footballer
- Agustín Fernández (politician) (born 1967), Argentine deputy
- Agustín Fernández (runner) (born 1938), Spanish Olympic runner
- Agustín Fernández Mallo (born 1967), Spanish physicist and writer
- Agustín Fernández Sánchez (born 1958), Bolivian composer
