= Germán Alfaro =

Argentine politician

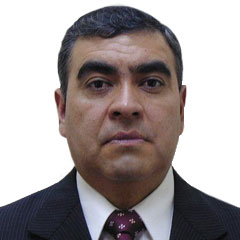

Mayor of San Miguel de Tucumán
- In office 28 October 2015 – 28 October 2023
- Preceded by: Domingo Amaya
- Succeeded by: Rossana Chahla

National Deputy
- In office 10 December 2007 – 10 December 2011
- Constituency: Tucumán Province

Provincial Legislator of Tucumán
- In office 27 October 1999 – 27 October 2003
- Preceded by: Pablo Yedlin
- Succeeded by: Luis Medina Ruiz

Personal details
- Born: Rossana Elena Chahla; 21 September 1965 (age 60) San Miguel de Tucumán, Argentina
- Party: Party for Social Justice (2019–2023); Compromiso Tucumán (2023–present)
- Other political affiliations: Cambiemos (2015–2019); Juntos por el Cambio (2021–present)
- Spouse: Beatriz Ávila

Germán Enrique Alfaro (born 21 September 1965) is an Argentine politician and leader of the Social Justice Party. He was part of the Justicialist Party, later migrating to the Party for Social Justice, the Agreement for the Bicentennial, and Together for Change. He was mayor of the city of San Miguel de Tucumán between 2015 and 2023. In 2021, he was elected senator, and the next day he resigned from his seat to leave the position to his wife, deputy Beatriz Ávila.

== Biography ==
He was born on September 21, 1965, in the city of San Miguel de Tucumán. He grew up in the Villa Amalia neighborhood, where he lived until 2000. He completed his primary studies at the John Kennedy Institute; he completed his secondary studies at the General Araoz Military High School in Lamadrid, graduating as a Second Lieutenant of the Reserve. He is married to the National Representative for Tucumán, Beatriz Ávila, with whom he is the father of four children.

== Political career ==
He began political activism from a very young age within Peronism, which nourished his political vocation. He was twice elected Councilor of the City of San Miguel de Tucumán for the Justicialista Party in the periods (1995 -1999 / 2011–2013). He was also a provincial legislator in the period (1999–2003) and a National Deputy (2007–2011), and served twice as Secretary of the Government during Domingo Amaya's administration. In a debate of candidates for Mayor organized by the newspaper La Gaceta and Canal 8 (Tucumán), Alfaro gave his sworn statement to journalists so that they could compare it with the sworn statement at the end of his term if he is elected. After being elected, and a week after taking office as mayor, he clarified that the public presentation of the content of his sworn statement was only a "political gesture", and that it will not be made public. Finally, a Tucumán prosecutor investigates the possible commission of violations of the Electoral Code National. The prosecutor charged the delegate of the Ministry of Social Development in Tucumán, Laura Costa.

On October 17 of the following year he created his own party, the Party for Social Justice, with which he ran in the legislative elections of that year. He supported José Cano at the provincial level, from whom he would distance himself in 2017 after the complaint by prosecutor Guillermo Marijuán for alleged illicit negotiations in South Korea of a group of those close to José Cano, main referent of Cambiemos in Tucumán. In the midst of the campaign for the 2017 legislative elections, in Tafí Viejo it was reported that trucks from the Ministry of Social Development of the Nation were unloading appliances, beds and mattresses in San Miguel de Tucumán, in charge of Alfaro who supposedly delivered them irregular property of the national State in private vehicles and trucks in the capital of Tucumán with the intention of "buying votes." Social Development sends appliances to Tucumán to buy votes.

In the 2019 elections he was a member of the Vamos Tucumán list and was re-elected mayor by winning the elections with 41.88 percent of the votes.

On October 31, 2019, he assumed his second term with the objective "of being able to finish what he started, of being able to give back to all the neighbors what I have received and am receiving as mayor, affection and more affection." In the legislative elections of 2021 he was elected senator for the province of Tucumán. The mayor had assured that he was not a testimonial candidate. He presented himself as a candidate for Together for Change. and after having assured that he was not a testimonial candidate, he resigned from his seat to give his place to his wife Beatriz Ávila.

He ran for Vice Governor of Tucumán in the Tucumán Provincial Elections of 2023, with Roberto Antonio Sánchez as a candidate for governor. He lost with 34.09% of the votes.

In the 2023 provincial elections he promoted and supported the candidacy of his wife Beatriz Ávila for the Mayor of San Miguel de Tucumán, for Together for Change Tucumán. In a close election, Ávila lost the mayoralty to the Peronist candidate Rossana Chahla.
