= Miguel Ángel Acevedo =

Argentine accountant and politician (born 1960)

Vice Governor of Tucumán
- Incumbent
- Assumed office 29 October 2023
- Governor: Osvaldo Jaldo
- Preceded by: Osvaldo Jaldo
- In office 20 September 2021 – 23 February 2023
- Governor: Osvaldo Jaldo
- Preceded by: Osvaldo Jaldo

Personal details
- Born: April 8, 1960 (age 66) Ceres, Santa Fe, Argentina
- Party: Justicialist Party
- Profession: Public accountant

Miguel Ángel Acevedo (born 8 April 1960) is an Argentine public accountant and politician. He has been the vice governor of the Province of Tucumán since 2023.

== Biography ==
Miguel Ángel Acevedo was born in Ceres, Santa Fe. His family moved to San Miguel de Tucumán when he was four. He received his degree as a national public accountant from the Saint Thomas Aquinas University of the North.

In 1984, Acevedo became a technician for the General Directorate of Organization and Methods of Tucumán Province. He became the head of the directorate in the 1990s during the military governorship of Antonio Domingo Bussi. During this period, he also became secretary of state for finance and was the province's minister of economy.

In the early 2000s, Acevedo became aligned with the Peronist state governments of Julio Miranda and José Alperovich, and became a trusted member of their administrations. In 2002, he was appointed director of fiscal policy. From 2003 until 2007, he was the "Undersecretary of State of the Secretariat of Coordination with Municipalities and Rural Communes", and was secretary of that department from 2007 until 2015. In 2015, Acevedo became the province's interior minister.

After the candidacy of Juan Luis Manzur, who was running for vice governor of Tucumán, was annulled by the Supreme Court of Argentina on 9 May 2023, Acevedo was presented as a replacement candidate, becoming the running mate of Osvaldo Jaldo of the Frente de Todos party. Jaldo and Acevedo were elected with 55% of the votes in the 2023 Argentine provincial elections.
