= Independence (legislative bloc) =

Independence Independencia
- Leader: Osvaldo Jaldo
- President: Agustín Fernández
- Founded: 24 January 2024
- Ideology: Federal Peronism; Jaldism
- Senate (Tucumán seats): 0 / 3
- Chamber of Deputies (Tucumán seats): 3 / 9
- Governors: 1 / 24
- Legislature of Tucumán: 34 / 49

The Independence (Spanish: Independencia) is an Argentine legislative bloc founded in 2024 and promoted by the governor of Tucumán Osvaldo Jaldo, in the context of the negotiations for the approval of the Bases Law of President Javier Milei in January 2024.

== History ==
The bloc foundation arose from negotiations between the government of Javier Milei and the Peronist government of the Province of Tucumán, in which Governor Osvaldo Jaldo agreed to support the approval of the Law of Bases for Freedom, although later the bloc has distanced from the government.

This measure was criticized by various sectors of Peronism and the Left. Furthermore, a sector of the Tucumán Justicialist Party led by Juan Luis Manzur decided not to join the new bloc, among them is Manzur himself, the national senator Sandra Mendoza, the deputies Pablo Yedlin and Carlos Aníbal Cisneros.
