= Daniel Gollan =

Argentine cardiologist and politician

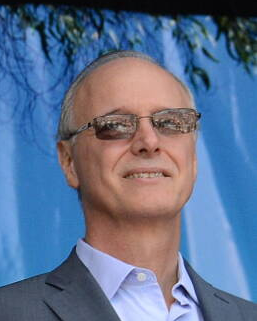

National Deputy
- Incumbent
- Assumed office 10 December 2021
- Constituency: Buenos Aires

Minister of Health of Buenos Aires Province
- In office 12 December 2019 – 28 July 2021
- Governor: Axel Kicillof
- Preceded by: Andrés Scarsi
- Succeeded by: Nicolás Kreplak

Minister of Health
- In office 26 February 2015 – 10 December 2015
- President: Cristina Fernández de Kirchner
- Preceded by: Juan Luis Manzur
- Succeeded by: Jorge Lemus

Personal details
- Born: 5 June 1955 (age 71) Rosario, Argentina
- Party: Justicialist Party
- Education: National University of Rosario

Daniel Gollán (born 5 June 1955) is an Argentine cardiologist and politician. He served as Health Minister of Argentina for a brief period during the presidency of Cristina Fernández de Kirchner in 2015, and as Health Minister of Buenos Aires Province from 2019 to 2021. Since 2021, he has been a National Deputy.

== Early life and education ==
Gollan was born on 5 June 1955 in Rosario. He studied medicine at the National University of Rosario, during the Dirty War. As a student, he joined the Juventud Universitaria Peronista, the Justicialist Party's student wing, where he met the future president Néstor Kirchner. He studied under the guidance of the cardiologist Floreal Ferrara.

== Political career ==
He led the ANMAT from 2008 to 2010, and advised the Carta Abierta group on health-related issues.

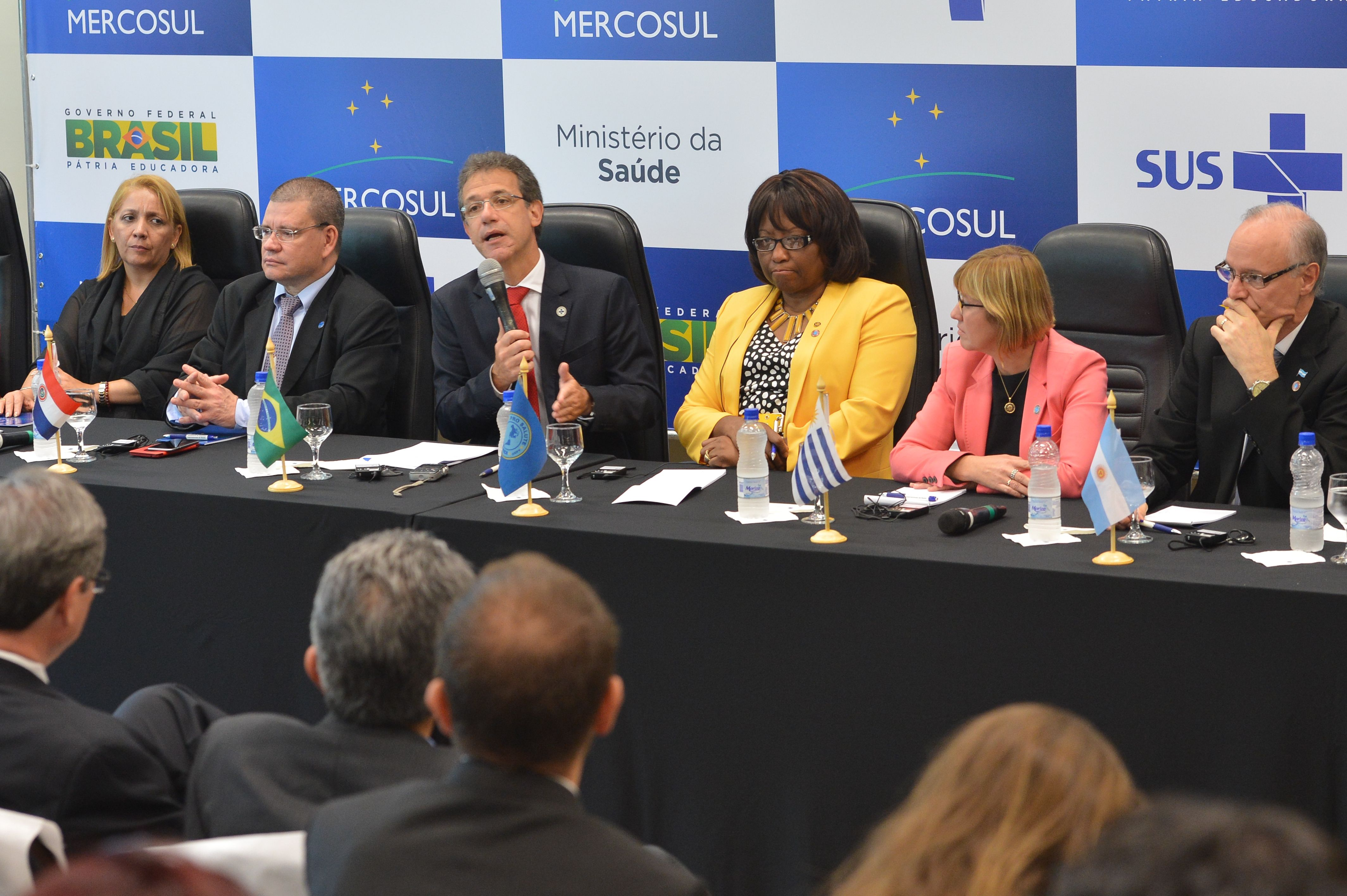
Daniel Gollan with fellow health ministers of Mercosul in 2015

He was appointed minister of health in Argentina, on 26 February 2015. Replacing Juan Luis Manzur. Kirchnerism could not achieve a victory for Daniel Scioli in the 2015 presidential election that allowed him to prevent a ballotage, and runs for a runoff election against Mauricio Macri. Kirchnerism reacted with a negative campaigning against Macri. Gollan said, in his Twitter account, "The 12 new radiation therapy centers to treat cancer will continue if Scioli is president. Think well before you vote". The opposition asked for his resignation, and Gollan deleted the post and claimed that his account had been hacked. Still, his previous posts had a similar tone. Anyhow, the statements in this negative campaigning showed to be true, as after Scioli lost the election and Mauricio Macri become the President of Argentina, many hospitals were closed, Argentina's public health system was seriously deteriorated and the Health Ministry itself was demoted to a Secretariat, with lower budget and less decision powers.

Ahead of the 2021 primary elections, Gollán was confirmed as the second candidate in the Frente de Todos list to the Argentine Chamber of Deputies in Buenos Aires Province. He resigned from his post as Health Minister of the province on 28 July 2021 to focus on the campaign, and was succeeded by his vice-minister, Nicolás Kreplak.

== Electoral history ==
Electoral history of Daniel Gollán
Election	Office	List	#	District	Votes			Result	Ref.
Election	Office	List	#	District	Total	%	P.	Result	Ref.
2021	National Deputy	Frente de Todos	2	Buenos Aires Province	3,444,446	38.59%	2nd (Note: Presented on an electoral list. The data shown represents the share of the vote the entire party/alliance received in that constituency.)	Elected	
