= Osvaldo Jaldo =

Argentine politician (born 1958)

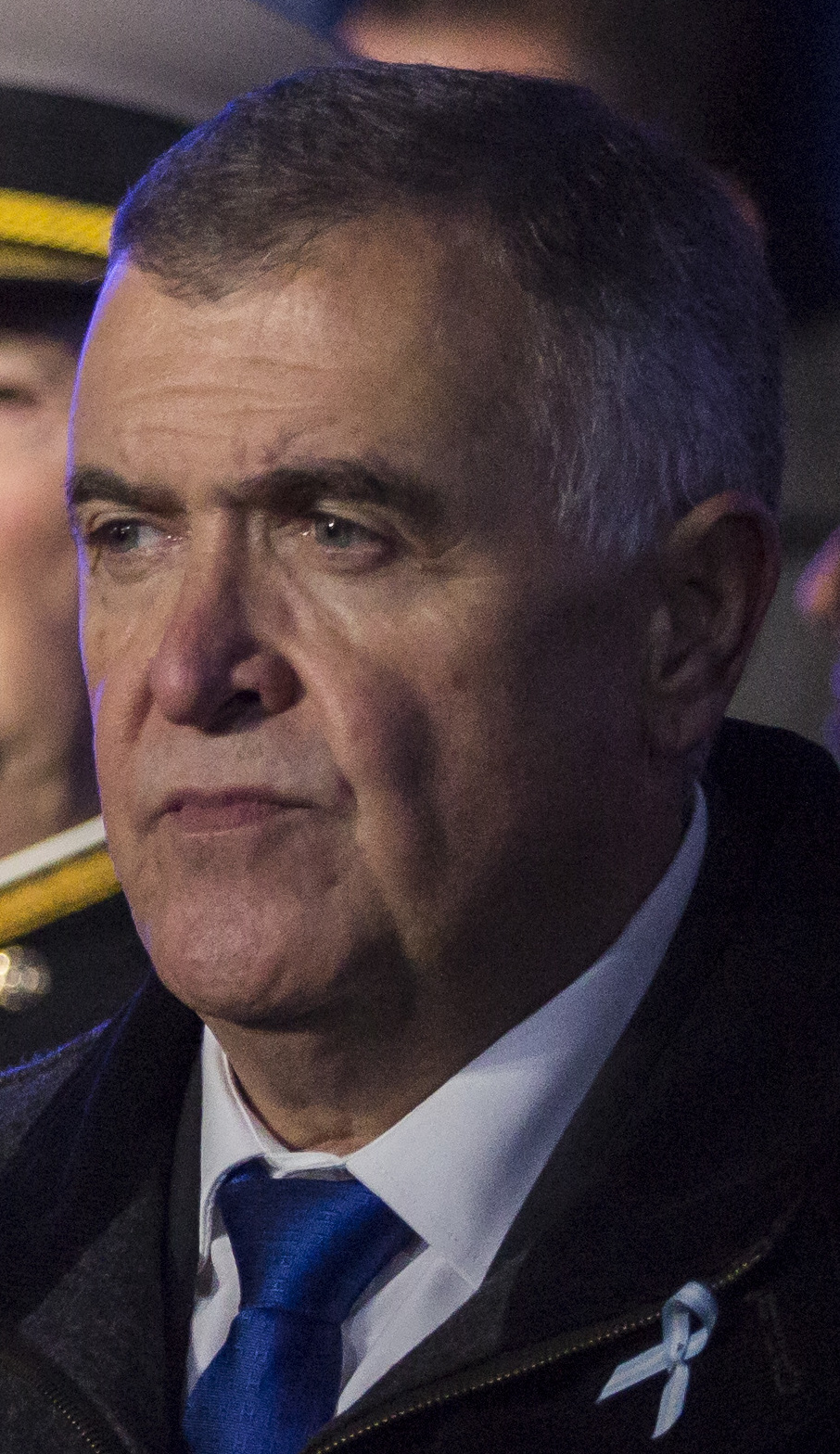

Governor of Tucumán
- Incumbent
- Assumed office 29 October 2023
- Vice Governor: Miguel Ángel Acevedo
- Preceded by: Juan Luis Manzur
- In office 20 September 2021 – 23 February 2023
- Vice Governor: Himself
- Preceded by: Juan Luis Manzur
- Succeeded by: Juan Luis Manzur

Vice Governor of Tucumán
- In office 29 October 2015 – 20 September 2021
- Governor: Juan Luis Manzur
- Preceded by: Juan Luis Manzur
- Succeeded by: Miguel Ángel Acevedo
- In office 23 February 2023 – 29 October 2023
- Governor: Juan Luis Manzur
- Preceded by: Miguel Ángel Acevedo
- Succeeded by: Miguel Ángel Acevedo

National Deputy
- In office 10 December 2013 – 5 March 2014
- Constituency: Tucumán

Personal details
- Born: April 19, 1958 (age 68) Trancas, Tucumán, Argentina
- Other political affiliations: Justicialist Party
- Education: Universidad del Norte Santo Tomás de Aquino
- Website: www.osvaldojaldo.com.ar

Osvaldo Francisco Jaldo (April 19, 1958) is an Argentine public accountant and politician. Since 2023, he has been governor of the province of Tucumán. He had been vice governor between 2015 and 2023; he served between September 2021 and February 2023 as interim governor following the appointment of Governor Manzur as Chief of Staff of Ministers of the Nation.

== Biography ==
Jaldo is a native of the town of Trancas, province of Tucumán. He received his degree as a national public accountant from the Universidad del Norte Santo Tomás de Aquino.

=== Political career ===
In 1987 he was elected mayor of Trancas. From 1989 to 1995 he was a provincial legislator.

In 1995 he returned to the mayor of Trancas and in 1999 he returned to the Legislature.

In 2000 he was appointed Minister of Economy during the mandate of Governor Julio Miranda.

In 2003 he was elected for a third term as mayor of Trancas. In 2004 he was appointed as controller of the province's Popular Savings Bank.

In 2007 he was elected as a provincial legislator. In 2009 he was elected national deputy. At the request of Governor José Alperovich, he resigned from office before taking office to continue heading the Ministry of the Interior.

In 2011 he was elected provincial legislator. The governor decided to keep him at the head of the Ministry of the Interior.

In 2013 he was elected national deputy. The following year he was summoned by Governor Alperovich to take charge of the Ministry of the Interior.

In 2015 he was elected vice-governor, accompanying Juan Manzur in the formula, a position for which he was re-elected in Tucumán provincial elections of 2019 .

In 2017 he was elected national deputy. He resigned before taking office.

In 2020, he was elected pro tempore head of PARLANOA by his peers from the provinces of the region.

=== Interim Government ===
In September 2021, following the appointment of Governor Manzur as head of the Cabinet of Ministers, summoned by the President of the Nation Alberto Fernández, Jaldo was placed in charge of the provincial Executive Branch.

In 2023 he was elected governor of Tucumán accompanied by Miguel Acevedo as a candidate for vice-governor who ran for the banning of Juan Manzur, obtaining the 54.96% of the votes against Roberto Sánchez of Together for Change.

== Management as Governor ==
After he served as interim governor between 2021 and February 2023, he was elected governor in the Tucumán provincial elections of 2023, and since October 29, 2023, he has been the governor of Tucumán.

=== Government Cabinet ===
Ministries of the Government of Osvaldo Jaldo
| Briefcase | Headline | Period |
|---|---|---|
| Ministry of Government and Justice | Regino Amado | October 29, 2023 - in office |
| Ministry of Economy and Production | Daniel Abad | October 29, 2023 - in office |
| Ministry of Education | Susana Montaldo | October 29, 2023 - in office |
| Ministry of Social Development | Federico Masso | October 29, 2023 - in office |
| State Attorney | Gilda Pedicone de Valls | October 29, 2023 - in office |
| Ministry of the Interior | Dario Monteros | October 29, 2023 - in office |
| Ministry of Health | Luis Medina Ruiz | December 7, 2021 - in office |
| Ministry of Security | Eugenio Agüero Gamboa | October 26, 2021 - in office |
| General Secretary of the Interior | Federico Nazur | October 29, 2023 - in office |
| Ministry of Public Works and Public Services | Santiago Yanotti | October 29, 2023 - in office |

== Controversies ==
=== Dispute with Juan Manzur ===
In the 2021 PASO primaries he generated controversy by breaking the unity of the Justicialista Party of Tucumán by presenting himself as a candidate for Deputy, generating an internal when facing the list of candidates of the governor Juan Manzur, in addition to a series of statements against the driver of the executive government of the province. Finally, Jaldo, upon losing the election with 39.64% of votes, declined his candidacy despite having won second place for the General Elections, being replaced by Agustín Fernandez. In September 2021, Manzur was appointed Chief of Ministers, so Jaldo assumed the Interim governorship, calming the internal situation. In the Tucumán provincial elections of 2023 candidates for the governorship with the Jaldo-Manzur formula were in unity, but due to Manzur's disqualification from being a candidate, the formula finally ended up being formed by Jaldo and Miguel Acevedo.

In 2024, the Unity was broken when the legislative bloc of the Justicialista Tucumán Party separated into two currents, generating controversy with the deputies closest to Jaldo entering the Independence Block while the deputies closest to Manzur they remained in the block of Unión por la Patria.

=== Creation of the Independence parliamentary group ===
In January 2024, it generated internal controversies in Unión por la Patria after three national deputies for Tucumán decided to leave the coalition bloc to form their own Independencia bloc after voting in favor of the ruling. of the "Bases Law" of the government of Javier Milei. After this, the governor argued that "the national government acceded to the requests of Tucumán and the different sectors of production" and declared that they were not being pressured by anyone and acted in total freedom. Among the negative reactions is that of the head of the UxP bloc, Germán Martínez: "He who betrays once, does it twice."
