= Protests against Javier Milei =

Argentinian protests against reforms by Javier Milei

2024 Argentina protests Protestas argentinas de 2024
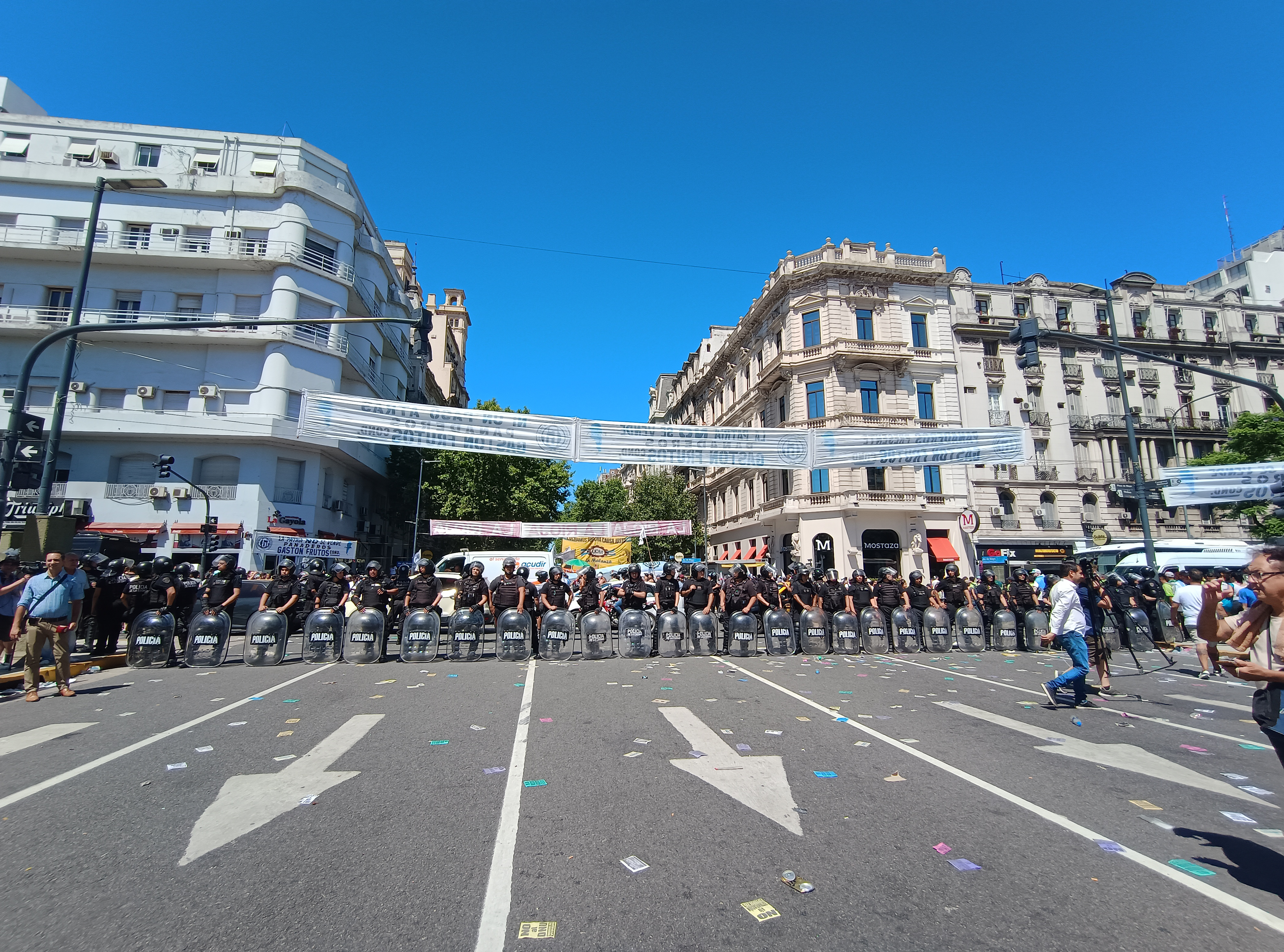
- Date: January – June 2024
- Location: Mainly Buenos Aires, Argentina
- Methods: Protests, demonstrations, civil disobedience, civil resistance, online activism, riots

The 2024 Argentina protests were a series of protests and riots in Argentina that took place from January to June 2024 in response to reforms introduced by President Javier Milei.

Milei proposed reducing the number of government ministries and addressing economic challenges through spending cuts and fiscal reforms. He also criticised previous administrations for what he described as excessive public spending. Protesters, however, opposed the reforms, accusing the government of contributing to rising inflation and poverty and of weakening Argentina's democratic institutions.

The reform package included tax incentives for investors and the dismissal of thousands of state employees. Protesters described these measures as a "radical overhaul".

On 12 June 2024, the Argentine Senate passed Milei's reforms by a vote of 37–36. The legislation included provisions on privatisation and tax breaks for investors. Most demonstrations took place in Buenos Aires, the capital and most populous city of Argentina. Riot police attempted to disperse the crowds and arrested 18 demonstrators. A vehicle belonging to the radio station Cadena 3 was set on fire during the unrest.

== Background ==
As inflation rose above 100% in May 2023, Milei's standing in opinion polls increased. In the August 2023 primary elections, which were viewed as an indicator of voter preferences ahead of the October 2023 general election, he emerged as the leading candidate.

Milei was inaugurated president on 10 December 2023. In addition to facing limited support in Congress, Milei publicly discussed a broad package of reforms, prompting opposition among trade unions and other groups.

According to The Washington Post, Milei's reform package includes a wide range of measures:

- declaration of a state of emergency, granting the president expanded powers in areas such as energy, pensions, security, and taxation until 2027
- privatization of several state-owned companies
- significant tax breaks and incentives for foreign companies investing US$200 million or more
- extension of probationary periods for workers
- tax amnesty

The reform package drew substantial criticism from Kirchnerism, non-Kirchnerist Peronism, smaller left-wing groups, and the Radical Civic Union.

== Protests ==
=== January ===
The reform package was implemented on 24 January. A general strike was organised across Argentina in response to the measures. The United States Embassy in Argentina advised U.S. tourists to "avoid areas of demonstrations". Tens of thousands of people took part in protests against Milei's reforms. Protesters marched to the CGT, the country's main trade union. "We come to defend 40 years of democracy, defend the homeland", CGT leader Héctor Daer told the crowd. Reports stated that approximately 40,000 people participated. On 31 January, police dispersed anti-government protests, injuring 25 journalists and arresting six people.

=== February ===
On 1 February, four women were arrested for peacefully protesting in front of Congress Plaza. Two days later, several Argentine human rights groups accused the Argentine Federal Police of using chemical agents and rubber bullets against 35 journalists and lawyers.

On 8 February, activists launched a protest along Pueyrredón Bridge as part of a national strike. Demonstrations continued on 23 February, when thousands protested across Argentina to demand food aid for low-income communities as inflation worsened.

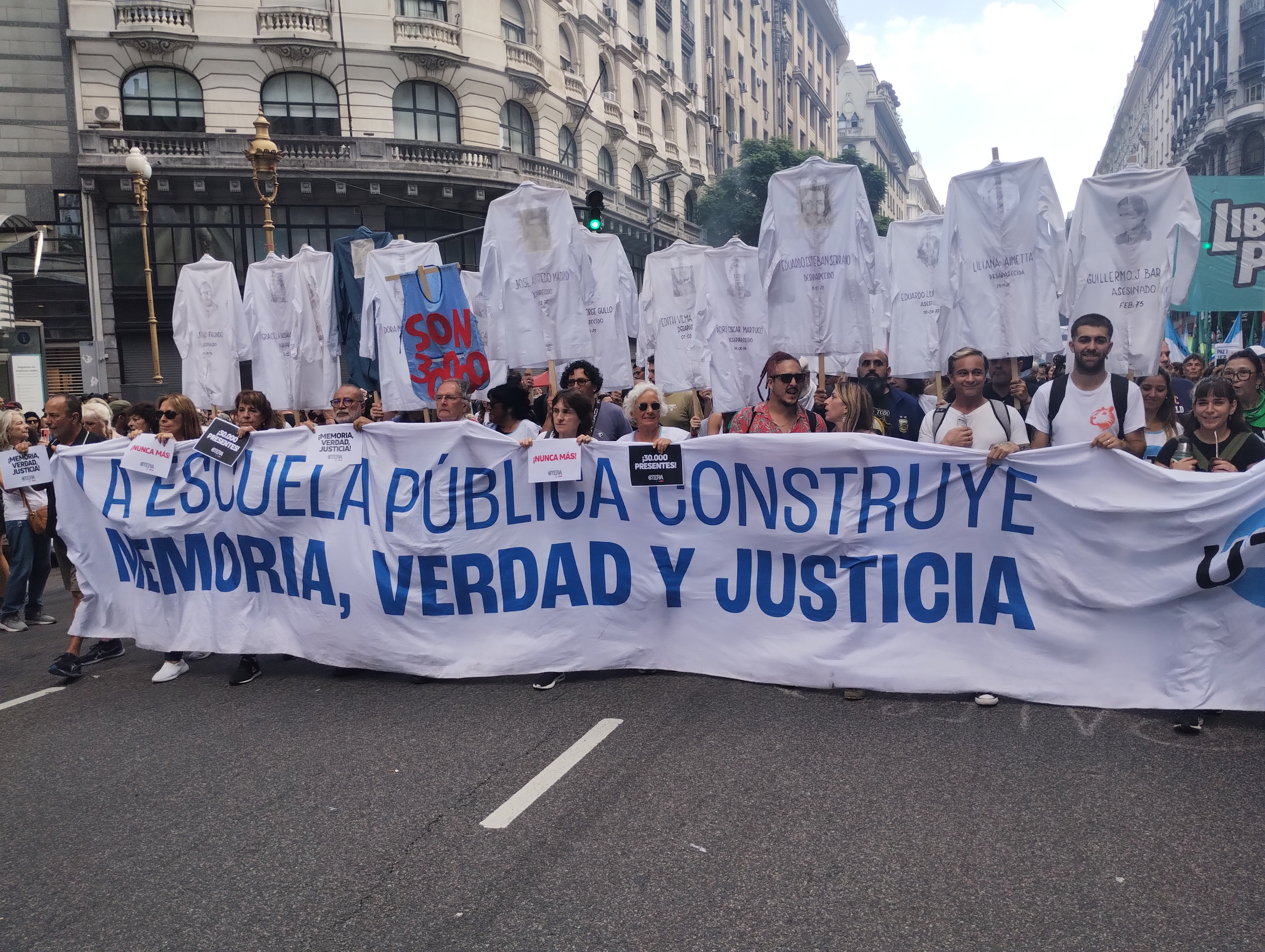
Buenos Aires rally for justice, 24 March 2024

=== March ===
On 18 March, social movements blocked more than 500 roads nationwide. Several people sustained minor injuries, and reports of a violent police crackdown emerged in Mendoza. The following day, two police officers and a journalist were injured in anti-government unrest.

=== April ===
On 10 April, 11 protesters were arrested and at least six people were injured when police dispersed demonstrations in Buenos Aires. The following day, police clashed with anti-government protesters demonstrating against spending cuts, injuring at least six people.

On 23 April, universities in Argentina organised a large march opposing budget cuts. According to social organisations, the demonstration was dispersed and several arrests were reported.

On 26 April, mass protests took place across Argentina against reduced higher education funding.

=== May ===
On 7 May, 11 people were arrested during a protest demanding increased food aid. The demonstration took place outside the presidential residence in Olivos.

On 9 May, Argentina's largest trade unions announced a 24-hour strike, which brought much of the country to a halt as banks, businesses, and public agencies closed.

On 26 May, police in Córdoba dispersed a peaceful anti-government protest, resulting in several injuries and arrests.

On 30 May, train services in Buenos Aires slowed significantly due to a conductors' protest.

=== June ===
On 12 June, Argentina's Senate passed Milei's reform package. In response, anti-government protesters clashed with police forces in Buenos Aires and in other cities across the country. Security forces used tear gas and water cannons against demonstrators outside the National Congress of Argentina. At least five people were injured and treated by medical personnel. Protesters threw stones and Molotov cocktails near Congress. The Buenos Aires press union reported that at least a dozen journalists were hit by rubber bullets. Authorities stated that at least 20 police officers were injured. Police later reported the arrest of 15 people.

== Responses ==
- The IACHR reported that "approximately 285 individuals had been injured as a result of the actions of law enforcement agencies".
- The Human Rights Law Centre stated that "physical injuries [were] caused by the excessive and unjustified use of force" during the protests.
- Officials from the Milei administration accused violent demonstrators of attempting to destabilise the government, describing the actions as a "modern coup d'état".

== Decline ==
After taking office in December 2023, Patricia Bullrich issued a protocol addressing demonstrations and roadblocks carried out by piquetero groups. The Workers' Party filed an habeas corpus petition seeking to prevent the protocol from taking effect, but judge Gustavo Pierretti rejected the request. Several piquetero groups called for a large demonstration on 20 December, one week after the inauguration of President Javier Milei.

The government announced that demonstrators who committed crimes during protests—such as roadblocks or vandalism—would lose their welfare benefits. It also provided a phone number for reporting piquetero leaders allegedly coercing individuals to participate in demonstrations. The protest saw low turnout, and the hotline reportedly received 660 complaints.

These policies were maintained for subsequent demonstrations. Welfare assistance that had previously been managed by piquetero organizations was returned to direct state administration, and social leaders working within the Ministry of Social Development—despite potential conflicts of interest—were dismissed. Audits indicated that some social organizations responsible for managing outsourced welfare aid allocated only a portion of the resources for their intended purpose.

These developments weakened the influence of piquetero groups, and the size of protests and demonstrations declined significantly.

== See also ==
- Public image of Javier Milei
