= 2009 swine flu pandemic in Argentina =

2009 flu pandemic in Argentina
- Confirmed cases Deaths confirmed

- +1 cases +50 cases +10 cases +100 cases

- 1+ death 50+ deaths 10+ deaths 100+ deaths
- Disease: Swine influenza
- Pathogen: H1N1
- First outbreak: from Mexico DF
- Arrival date: 29 June 2009
- Confirmed cases: 12,010
- Deaths: 626
- Total ILI cases: 1,479,988

Government website
- H1N1 at the Ministry of Health website

The influenza A virus subtype H1N1 (initially known as swine influenza virus or as new flu, and also locally known as gripe A, gripe porcina, and influenza porcina) arrived in Argentina in late April 2009, through air traffic contact with endemic areas, especially Mexico and the United States. The World Health Organization (WHO) and the Argentine health authorities expressed their concern from the beginning of the outbreak, that the imminent arrival of the southern winter could cause "more serious" effects in the southern hemisphere than those caused in Mexico, and could lead to a rebound of the epidemic around the world. The flu or influenza is mainly a seasonal disease that becomes most prevalent in winter.

The first infection was confirmed on May 7 in a man who had come from Mexico City and had entered the country without symptoms on April 24. The second case was detected on May 22. Towards the end of May infection started in some schools in the northern community of the City of Buenos Aires and its suburbs, the main part of the country affected by the epidemic.

On June 15 the first death was announced: a three-month-old baby in the Greater Buenos Aires area. In the second half of June, coinciding with the onset of winter, the virus was widely transmitted in Buenos Aires and spread to other parts of the country, especially the Province of Santa Fe, with its center in the city of Rosario.

On June 29, the Government decided to close schools throughout the month of July, a measure which affected 11 million students. Pregnant women and other categories at risk were also dispensed from working. The measures taken by the authorities were primarily targeted to limit contagion during the winter months until the start of spring.

The peak of infection lasted from the end of June until the beginning of July, increasing normal hospital demand fivefold and causing the collapse of the systems organizing hospital wards, home doctors and work place doctors. The most affected area was Greater Buenos Aires, home to some 12 million people. It was estimated that up to 10% of the population of that region (approximately 1,200,000 people) could be affected by the pandemic of influenza A.

In Argentina, seasonal flu outbreaks kill about 4,000 people each year, equivalent to a rate of 10 deaths per 100,000 inhabitants. The contingency plan developed in 2006 to face a possible influenza pandemic estimated that the dead could reach 13,000 in the event of a moderate rate of infection (15%) and 30,000 in the event of a serious infection rate (35%).

== Timeline ==
=== April ===
April 26: The Ministry of Health issued an Epidemic Alert order asking airlines to report passengers with influenza symptoms arriving from Mexico and United States. The government also stepped up safety checks, and thermal scanners were used in airports to detect passengers running fevers.

April 28: The Argentine government suspended all flights originating in Mexico until May 15 as a precautionary measure. The first flight coming from Mexico arrived at Ezeiza International Airport on May 20.

=== May ===
May 1: The Argentine government sent charter flights to Mexico to pick up all Argentine tourists abroad who wished to return.

May 7: The first case of Influenza A (H1N1) was confirmed in the country, a tourist who had recently returned from Mexico. This man was from Puerto Madryn, Chubut Province.

May 22: Health Authorities confirmed the second case, a woman who had arrived from the United States about 20 days before.

=== June ===
June 25: A case of human-to-swine transmission was discovered in Buenos Aires province. The hog farm where it occurred was interdicted. This was the second known case of reverse-zoonosis in the world.

June 28: Due to the ongoing legislative elections and the possible resignation of the Health Minister, Graciela Ocaña, reports of confirmed cases and deaths were suspended.

June 29: Argentina's Health Minister, Graciela Ocaña, announced her resignation due to some political instability in the country and stated that the current government did not support her on some projects and plans she recommended for the betterment of the country. The Provinces of Santa Fe (after confirming the first two deaths), San Luis (with 5 confirmed cases and more than 30 suspected cases) and Santiago del Estero (which on the same day confirmed 12 cases of swine flu) each decided to suspend all classes of elementary, primary and secondary schools, and recommended that the universities adopt the same procedure.

June 30: The government of the Autonomous City of Buenos Aires alongside the government of the Buenos Aires province, decreed a Health Emergency, though public services continued their operations. Winter holidays for students had started two weeks before.

=== July ===
July 2: The newly appointed Health Minister Juan Luis Manzur estimated the number of affected people to be as high as 100,000, as well as 44 confirmed deaths.

July 14: The number of officially recognised cases skyrocketed, with 137 deaths, making the death toll in Argentina the second highest in the world, only behind the United States and surpassing confirmed cases in Mexico.

July 28: Impact on health services diminished significantly according to various specialists, though the death toll continued to increase, partly because of the delay in confirming previous fatalities. There had been no official report by the national Health Ministry since July 14.

July 30: Official reports of confirmed deaths from the provinces put the death toll around 260, while Critica newspaper published an interview with Jorge Yabkowski, president of the Sindical Federation of Health Professionals of Argentina (Fesprosa), giving an estimate death toll from H1N1 flu of above 400 (while USA was at 340), based on the false death count in Buenos Aires, where many patients may have "entered the hospitals almost dead and were not tested for H1N1".

=== August ===
August 3: The students returned to schools in all except 3 provinces, while awaiting a possible second wave. The estimated cumulative number of H1N1 cases was more than 400,000 Argentinians.

August 5: A new report was released by the ministry of health, showing 762,711 ILI cases up to Aug 1, 2009, of which more than 700,000 were of the A (H1N1) swine flu type. Only 47% of the 337 confirmed H1N1 flu deaths had a history of chronic disease or any other risk factor. Additionally, 402 deaths were in the process of being confirmed, whereas the number of cases began to decrease in 18 of the 24 provinces.

August 14: Further decrease in activity levels. Official death count: 404.

August 24: Indicators showed a decreasing activity tendency, while intensity was still high. The impact on health services returned to low, and most provinces had no recent deaths. The official death count was 439.

August 29: Week 32 saw no further decrease in new ILI cases, reaching 818,031 cumulative cases. Confirmed deaths: 465, deaths under study: 349.

=== September ===
September 7: ILI cases reported up to week 33: 1,054,707. Cumulative data up to week 32: 8,384 H1N1 lab-confirmed cases, 512 deaths (+196 under study), respiratory disease cases requiring hospitalization: 8,962.

September 12: Week 35 national report stated that up to week 34 there were 8,851 (+467) total lab-confirmed cases, with 514 (+2) confirmed deaths among them and 196 (+0) additional deaths under study (no provinces specified). The cumulative respiratory disease cases requiring hospitalization were 9,480 (+518), and the cumulative ILI cases reported were 1,060,285 (+5,578).

September 26: There was no official report for week 36. Week 37 national report: 9,036 (+185) total lab-confirmed cases; 538 (+24) confirmed deaths; 252 (+56) additional deaths under study. Cumulative respiratory disease cases requiring hospitalization: 10,306 (+826); cumulative ILI cases reported: 1,098,834 (+38,549).

=== October ===
October 2: Week 38 national report: 9,049 (+13) total lab-confirmed cases; 539 (+1) confirmed deaths; 254 (+2) additional deaths under study. Cumulative respiratory disease cases requiring hospitalization: 10,773 (+467); cumulative ILI cases reported: 1,151,655 (+52,821).

October 10: Week 39 national report: 9,119 (+70) total lab-confirmed cases; 580 (+41) confirmed deaths; 247 (−7) additional deaths under study. Notably, the date of decease of last confirmed death is August 20. Cumulative respiratory disease cases requiring hospitalization: 11,086 (+313); cumulative ILI cases reported: 1,163,433 (+11,778).

October 24: Week 40 national report: 9,196 (+77) total lab-confirmed cases; 585 (+5) confirmed deaths; 247 (+0) additional deaths under study. Last confirmed death: September 5. Cumulative respiratory disease cases requiring hospitalization: 11,689 (+603); cumulative ILI cases reported: 1,187,540 (+24,107).

=== November ===
November 1: Week 42 national report: 10,209 (+1,013) total lab-confirmed cases; 593 (+8) confirmed deaths; 248 (+1) additional deaths under study. Last confirmed death: September 12. Cumulative respiratory disease cases requiring hospitalization: 12,139 (+450); cumulative ILI cases reported: 1,219,949 (+32,409).

== Timeline Summary ==
2009	A (H1N1) Flu Outbreak and Pandemic Milestones in Argentina
May 7	First case confirmed in Chubut.
May 22	First case confirmed in Buenos Aires province.
May 23	First case confirmed in the City of Buenos Aires.
May 24	Community outbreaks confirmed.
May 30	First case confirmed in Neuquen.
June 1	First case confirmed in Santa Fe.
June 11	First case confirmed in Misiones.
June 12	First case confirmed in Córdoba.
June 14	First case confirmed in Tierra del Fuego.
June 15	First death confirmed in Buenos Aires province.
June 16	First death confirmed in the City of Buenos Aires.
June 17	First case confirmed in Chaco.
June 18	First case confirmed in Tucuman.
June 19	First case confirmed in Santa Cruz.
June 20	First case confirmed in San Juan.
June 21	First case confirmed in San Luis.
June 21	First case confirmed in Salta.
June 21	First case confirmed in La Pampa.
June 22	First case confirmed in Jujuy.
June 22	First case confirmed in Rio Negro.
June 22	First case confirmed in Mendoza.
June 22	Characterization of the genome of the virus.
June 23	First case confirmed in Corrientes.
June 23	First case confirmed in Entre Rios.
June 23	First case confirmed in Formosa.
June 24	First death confirmed in Misiones.
June 26	Second known cases of reverse zoonosis in the world.
June 27	First death confirmed in Santa Fe.
June 29	First case confirmed in Santiago del Estero.
June 30	First case confirmed in Catamarca.
July 1	First death confirmed in Corrientes.
July 4	First case confirmed in La Rioja.
July 5	First death confirmed in Córdoba.
July 14	First death confirmed in La Pampa.
July 21	First death confirmed in Mendoza.
July 24	First death confirmed in San Luis.
July 24	First death confirmed in Santiago del Estero.
August 1	First death confirmed in Tucuman.

== Confirmed cases and deaths by province ==
Confirmed cases and deaths by province
Provinces	National Health Ministry		Provinces / news reports		Source
Provinces	Confirmed Cases	Deaths	Confirmed Cases	Deaths	Date / Comment	References
Provinces	9,196	585	11,459	678	Sum of reports
Buenos Aires	2,888	207	2,888	207	Oct 23, PAHO
City of Buenos Aires	3,529	196	3,529	196	Oct 23, PAHO
Santa Fe	572	83	760	89	Jul 19/Aug 31
Córdoba	492	26	1,327	40	Aug 1/15, news
Misiones	38	3	195	23	Sep 9, Prov. MH
Rio Negro	129	10	256	21	Aug 21, news
Neuquén	219	11	271	13	Aug 16, HSN
Corrientes	129	8	179	13	Aug 27, news
Entre Ríos	149	8	199	12	Aug 30, news
Santa Cruz	83	7	253	11	Aug 9, news
Mendoza	119	6	150	10	Aug 18, news
San Luis	61	5	61	8	Sep 9, news
Santiago del Estero	39	3	110	6	Jul 27/31, news
San Juan	37	2	41	5	Aug 24, news
Salta	91	1	91	5	Aug 6, news
Tucumán	50	1	50	5	Aug 11, news
La Pampa	139	4	139	4	Aug 5, MSAR
Chubut	80	2	170	3	Sep 10, Prov. MH
Formosa	80	1	129	3	Aug 25, news
Chaco	36	0	157	2	Aug 7, news
Jujuy	22	1	259	1	Aug 10, news
Catamarca	3	0	3	1	Aug 27, news
Tierra del Fuego	187	0	187	0	Aug 12, PAHO
La Rioja	24	0	55	0	Aug 25, news
Latest national report, Oct 29, 2009 (no provinces specified): 10,209 (+1,013) total lab-confirmed cases; 593 (+8) confirmed deaths; 248 (+1) additional deaths under study. Cumulative respiratory disease cases requiring hospitalization 12,139 (+450); cumulative ILI cases reported: 1,219,949 (+32,409).

== Confirmed cases and deaths by date ==
Day	Number of confirmed cases	Added cases on that day
May 7	1	+1
May 22	2	+1
May 24	5	+3
May 25	19	+14
May 27	37	+18
May 28	70	+33
May 29	80	+10
May 30	100	+20
May 31	115	+15
June 1	131	+16
June 2	144	+13
June 3	151	+7
June 5	174	+23
June 6	202	+28
June 7	215	+13
June 8	235	+20
June 9	256	+21
June 10	281	+25
June 11	343	+62
June 12	470	+127
June 13	569	+99
June 14	644	+75
June 15	733	+89
June 16	871	+138
June 17	918	+47
June 18	946	+28
June 19	1,010	+64
June 20	1,080	+70
June 21	1,118	+38
June 22	1,213	+95
June 23	1,294	+81
June 24	1,391	+97
June 25	1,488	+97
June 26	1,587	+99
July 4	2,409	+822
July 5	2,485	+76
July 9	2,677	+192
July 11	2,928	+251
July 14	3,056	+128
Aug 5	5,619	+2,563
Aug 13	6,768	+1,149
Aug 21	7,173	+405
Aug 28	8,240	+1,067
Sep 4	8,384	+144
Sep 12	8,851	+467
Sep 25	9,036	+185
Oct 2	9,049	+13
Oct 9	9,119	+70
Oct 23	9,196	+77
Oct 29	10,183	+987
Nov 6	10,248	+65
Nov 18	11,030	+782
Dec 4	11,234	+204
Dec 11	11,393	+159
Dec 18	11,458	+65
Dec 30	11,746	+288

Day	Number of confirmed cases	Added cases on that day
June 15	1	+1
June 16	4	+3
June 18	6	+2
June 19	7	+1
June 22	10	+3
June 23	17	+7
June 24	21	+4
June 25	23	+2
June 26	26	+3
June 29	31	+5
June 30	41	+10
July 2	44	+3
July 3	52	+8
July 4	57	+5
July 10	82	+25
July 12	100	+18
July 14	137	+37
July 29	227	+90
Aug 5	337	+110
Aug 13	404	+67
Aug 21	439	+35
Aug 28	465	+26
Sep 4	512	+47
Sep 12	514	+2
Sep 25	538	+24
Oct 2	539	+1
Oct 9	580	+41
Oct 23	585	+5
Oct 29	593	+8
Nov 6	600	+7
Dec 4	613	+13
Dec 11	616	+3
Dec 18	617	+1
Dec 30	617	–
