= María Simón =

Argentine sculptor (1922–2009)

- Born: María Simón Padrós; 1922; Aguilares, Tucumán, Argentina
- Died: 5 July 2009 (aged 86–87); Buenos Aires, Argentina
- Known for: Sculpture
- Awards: Georges Braque Prize (1966)

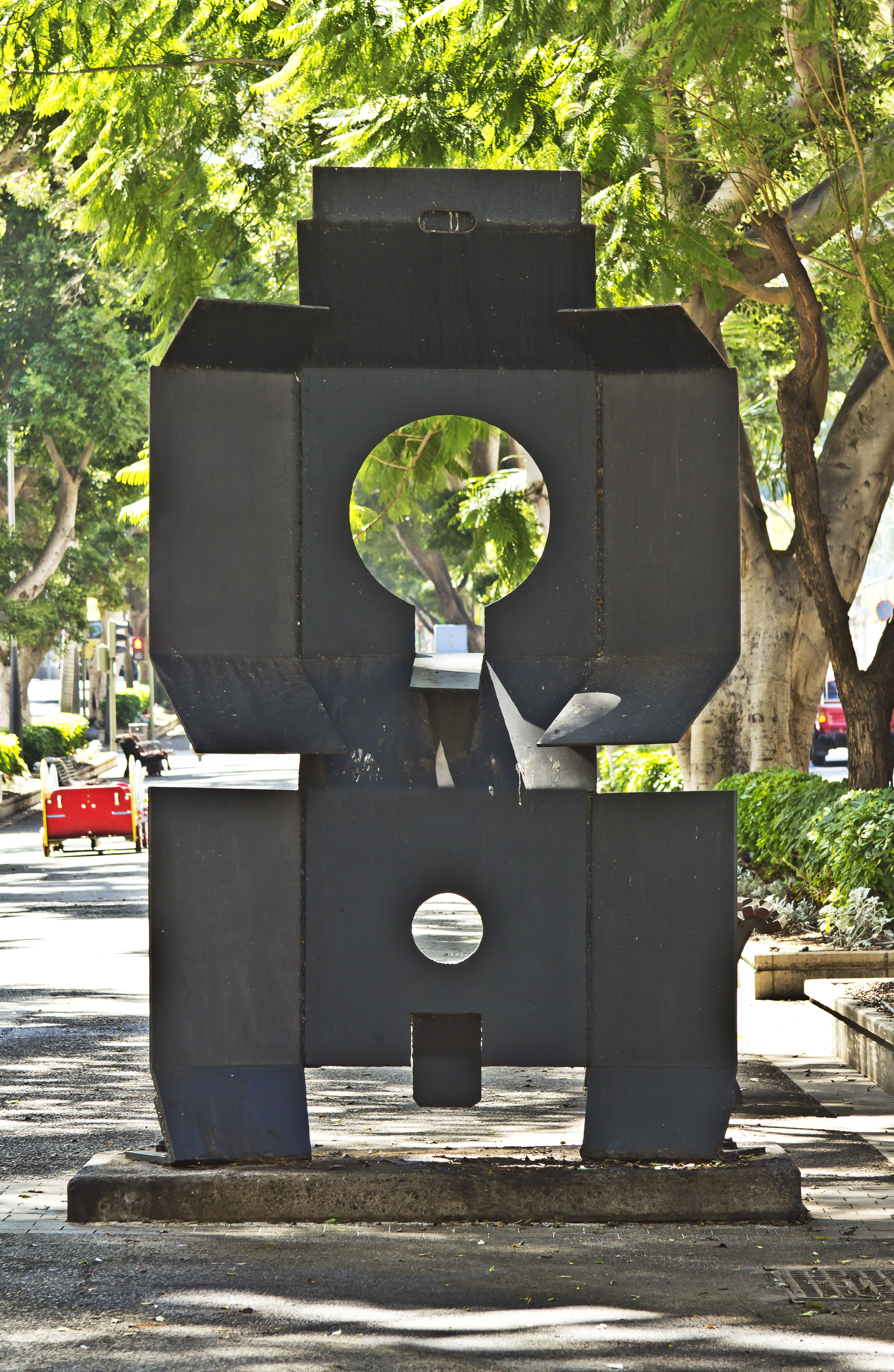
María Simón's work Hombre was exhibited at the I Exposición Internacional de Escultura en la Calle in Santa Cruz de Tenerife.

María Simón Padrós (1922 – 5 July 2009) was an Argentine sculptor.

== Biography ==
Simón was born in Aguilares, Tucumán in 1922. Her father, John Simon Padrós, was an engineer, a prominent politician and industrialist; her mother was Emilia Dublé.

At the age of 20, Simón studied sculpture with Jean Labourdette and five years later, with Libero Badíi. In 1964, she obtained a grant awarded by the British Council and moved to London, where she exhibited at the Institute of Contemporary Arts (ICA). Two years later, she received the Georges Braque Prize, and decided to move to Paris, where she remained for thirty-five years. There, she participated in various exhibitions at the Galería Rioboo, Salones de Mayo, Réalités Nouvelles, and the Museo de Bellas Artes. She also participated in the Venice Biennale (1972), Biennale of Tapestry in Lausanne, Biennials of Engraving at Ljubljana and in Puerto Rico, the First International Sculpture Street Exhibition in Santa Cruz de Tenerife, and the Basel Fail. In 1975, she won the Second Prize in Sculpture at the Biennial of São Paulo, and the First Prize at the Biennale Gravure Gibet in France. In 1981, she was awarded the Bronze Medal by the European Academy of Fine Arts.

Simón worked predominantly in bronze, followed by iron and aluminum. She used lead, resin, acrylic, textiles, cardboard or wood in her works. In Paris, she experimented with cardboard boxes collected from the street. The box becomes a symbol of the human being discarded after use. Simón moved to Buenos Aires in 2001, where she lived and worked until her death in 2009.
