= Beatriz Ávila =

Argentine politician (born 1966)

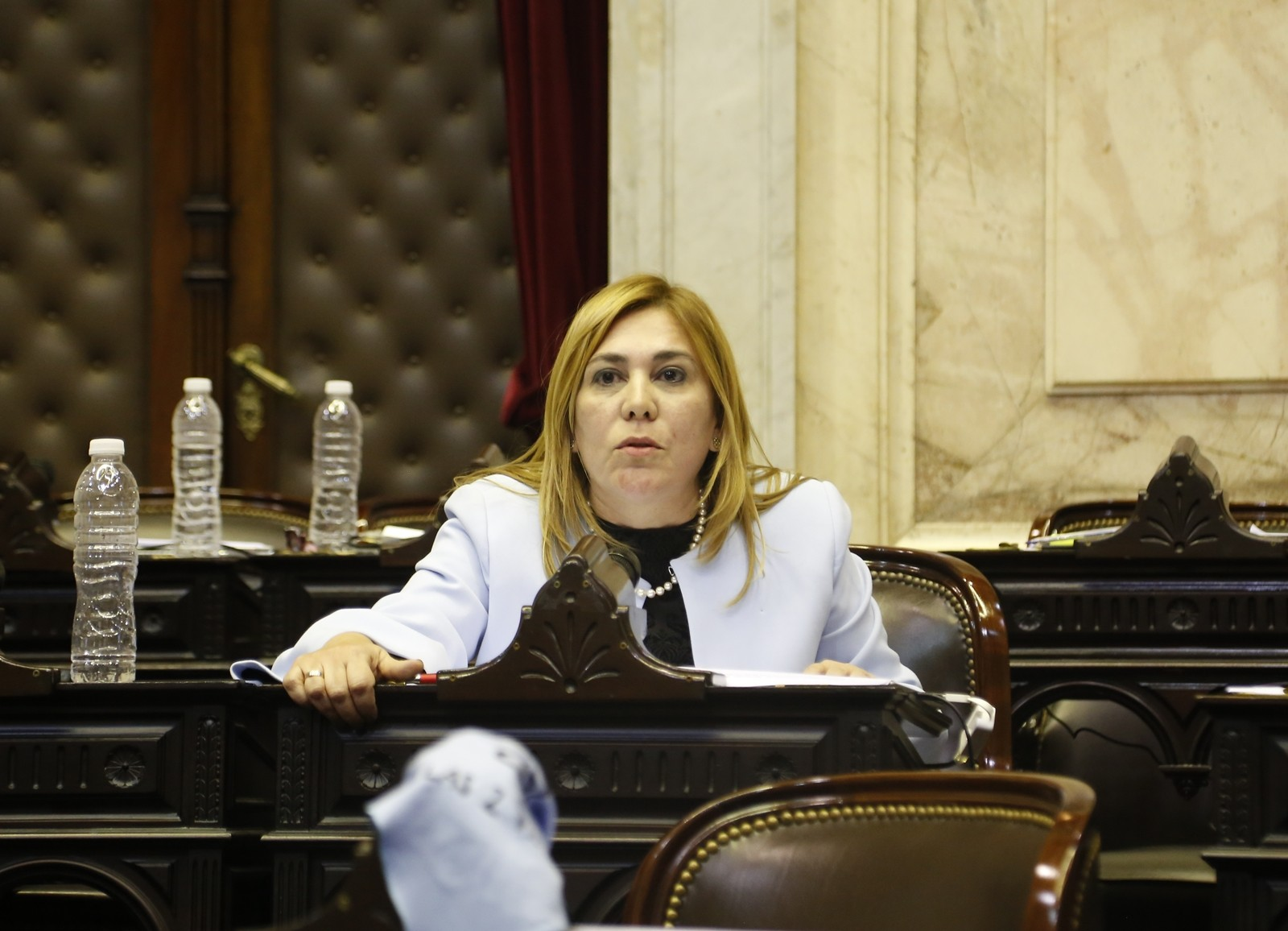

National Senator
- Incumbent
- Assumed office 10 December 2021
- Constituency: Tucumán

National Deputy
- In office 10 December 2017 – 10 December 2021
- Constituency: Tucumán

Provincial Legislator of Tucumán
- In office 29 October 2003 – 29 October 2015
- Constituency: I – Capital

Personal details
- Born: Beatriz Luisa Ávila; 5 October 1966 (age 59) San Miguel de Tucumán, Argentina
- Party: Party for Social Justice
- Other political affiliations: Cambiemos (2017–2019); Juntos por el Cambio (2021–present)

Beatriz Luisa Ávila (born 5 October 1966) is an Argentine journalist and politician, currently serving as a National Senator for Tucumán Province. Ávila previously served as a member of the Legislature of Tucumán from 2003 to 2017, and as a National Deputy from 2017 to 2021.

== Early life and education ==
Ávila was born on 5 October 1966 in San Miguel de Tucumán. She studied social communication at Instituto San Miguel, specializing on journalism in 1989. From 1992 to 2003 she worked at the Tucumán-based newspaper La Gaceta. Ávila is married to Germán Alfaro, mayor of San Miguel de Tucumán and founder of the Party for Social Justice, of which Ávila is a member.

== Political career ==
Ávila ran for a seat in the Argentine Chamber of Deputies in the 2017 legislative election; she was the second candidate in the Cambiemos list in Tucumán, behind José Manuel Cano. The list was the second-most voted, with 32.56% of the votes, enough for both Cano and Ávila to make it past the D'Hondt cut to be elected. She was sworn in on 10 December 2017.

Ávila initially formed part of the Cambiemos parliamentary inter-bloc, forming the Party for Social Justice single-member bloc. Following the 2019 general election, Ávila broke away from the Cambiemos inter-bloc and joined Pablo Ansaloni, José Luis Ramón and Antonio Carambia in forming the "Federal Unity for Development" inter-bloc. The move received nationwide attention and was criticized by president Mauricio Macri, head of the Cambiemos alliance. In November 2020, she broke away from the Federal Unity for Development inter-bloc, and remained in her single-member bloc by herself.

As a national deputy, Ávila formed part of the parliamentary commissions on Freedom of Expression, Municipal Affairs, Social Action and Public Health, and Co-operative Affairs and NGOs. She was an opponent of the legalization of abortion in Argentina, voting against the two Voluntary Interruption of Pregnancy bills that were debated by the Argentine Congress in 2018 and 2020.

=== National Senator ===
Ávila and her husband, Germán Alfaro, were the Juntos por el Cambio (JxC) candidates to the Tucumán seats in the Argentine Senate in the 2021 legislative election. Juntos por el Cambio was the second-most voted list in the province, granting Alfaro the minority seat as per the limited voting system used for the Argentine upper house. However, shortly after the election, Alfaro announced he would not be taking his seat; this meant the seat would go to the second candidate in the JxC list, Ávila.
