= Agustín Fernández (composer) =

Agustín Fernández (born 1958) is a Bolivian-born composer, conductor, and academic whose work spans contemporary classical music, electroacoustic composition, chamber music, opera, and orchestral music. His compositions are characterized by the integration of European modernist techniques with Latin American musical traditions, particularly those of Bolivia and Argentina. Over a career spanning more than five decades, he has established an international reputation through performances across Europe, North and South America, and Asia. Fernández served as Professor of Music at Newcastle University from 1995 until 2019 and has remained active as a composer following his departure from the United Kingdom. His works have been performed by ensembles and soloists, including the Royal Northern Sinfonia, Juilliard Symphony, Orquesta de Cadaqués, Orquesta de Castilla y León, New Juilliard Ensemble, Momenta Quartet, and Trío Apolo.

== Early life and education ==
Fernández was born in Bolivia, where he began his musical studies.

After completing his early education in Bolivia, he continued his musical studies abroad. He studied composition in Japan with the influential composer Akira Ifukube, whose refined orchestration and panache in the treatment of traditional materials had a lasting impact on Fernández's artistic development. He later pursued postgraduate studies in the United Kingdom, where he became closely associated with the contemporary music scene and established his academic career.

== Career ==
In the United Kingdom, after obtaining an MMus at Liverpool University and a PhD at City University Fernández was composer-in-residence at Queen's University Belfast since 1990 until 1994. Following a year's lectureship at Dartington College of Arts, he worked as a composition lecturer at Newcastle University from 1996 until 2007 and Professor of Composition there from 2007 until his resignation in 2019.

Fernández developed an international career as both composer and educator during the 1980s and 1990s. His compositions were increasingly performed by professional ensembles throughout Europe, and he gained recognition for works that combined sophisticated modernist techniques with elements inspired by Latin American culture.

In 1995 he joined Newcastle University as a lecturer in music. Over 24 years at the university, he taught composition, orchestration, and contemporary music while supervising postgraduate research. He was promoted to Professor of Music and became an influential figure in the university's music programmes, mentoring numerous composers and contributing to its international reputation.

Alongside his academic responsibilities, Fernández maintained an active compositional career. His works received commissions from orchestras, festivals, and chamber ensembles throughout Europe and the Americas. His music has been performed at international festivals dedicated to contemporary music and broadcast by radio organizations in several countries.

Following his retirement from Newcastle University in 2019, Fernández returned to Bolivia while continuing his international compositional activities. His recent work has reflected a renewed engagement with Bolivian musical traditions, collaborating with performers such as Trío Apolo and contributing folk arrangements and original works inspired by folk musical forms.

As was reported by the British tabloid press, in March 2020 Fernández was found guilty of sexual offences, for which Newcastle Crown Court gave him a lengthy custodial sentence. He was absent from the trial. Fernández has vehemently denied the accusations made against him and considers himself the target of a miscarriage of justice. He has also refuted tabloid reports of his having fled after being sentenced, stressing that he was absent from the country at the time of his trial. The issue remains unresolved.

== Music and style ==
Fernández's music reflects a synthesis of twentieth-century European modernism and Latin American musical traditions. While his early compositions drew upon post-tonal harmony and complex rhythmic structures, his later works increasingly explored Bolivian folk traditions, integrating rhythmic and melodic characteristics of genres such as taquirari, cueca, yaraví, and morenada into contemporary concert music.

Fernández often transforms traditional musical materials into original thematic and structural ideas. His works are noted for their highly developed textures, contrapuntal writing, expressive harmonic language, and attention to instrumental colour. His catalogue encompasses orchestral, chamber, solo instrumental, vocal, electroacoustic, and operatic compositions.

== Musical works ==
Fernández's work has been performed and acclaimed internationally, featuring at festivals such as Focus!, Summergarden (New York), ISEA (Montreal), International New Music Week (Bucharest), Latin American Music Festival (Caracas), Huddersfield Contemporary Music Festival, London International Opera Festival and many others. Some of his folk arrangements have been singled out for their wide appeal.

Misa de Corpus Christi, first premièred in La Paz under the twenty year-old composer's direction in 1978, was later destroyed and then recomposed in 2009 for performances in 2010 and 2011.

While his first electroacoustic work, the opera Teoponte, had mixed reviews on its London première (1988), the also electroacoustic Wounded Angel (1989) was generally well received internationally and was released twice on commercial recordings. His second opera, The Wheel (1993), was generally considered a success on its London première by Royal Opera House's now extinct Garden Venture. Also well received were two subsequent works for baritone, choir and orchestra: Approaching Melmoth, premièred in 2000 with Thomas Allen as the soloist, and Notes from Underground (2016). Upon the New York première of his String Quartet No. 2 Sin tiempo (a Koussevitzky commission), one reviewer commented “…this city needs a Fernández festival”.

Fernández has been a regular visitor to Romania for speaking engagements and performances of his work, especially at the Sigismund Toduță International Festival in Cluj-Napoca and also at the SIMN Festival in Bucharest. In 2018 the Music Academy Gheorghe Dima of Cluj-Napoca awarded him an honorary doctorate.
