= Agustín Fernández (artist) =

Cuban painter, sculptor, and multimedia artist

- Born: April 16, 1928; Havana, Cuba
- Died: June 2, 2006 (aged 78); New York, United States of America
- Movement: Surrealism
- Spouse(s): Maria Elena Molinet de la Caridad, Lia Fernández (born Epelboim)

Agustín Fernández (16 April 1928 - 2 June 2006) was a Cuban painter, sculptor, and multimedia artist. Although he was born in Cuba, he spent the majority of his career outside of Cuba, and produced art in Havana, Paris, San Juan, and New York.

== Biography ==
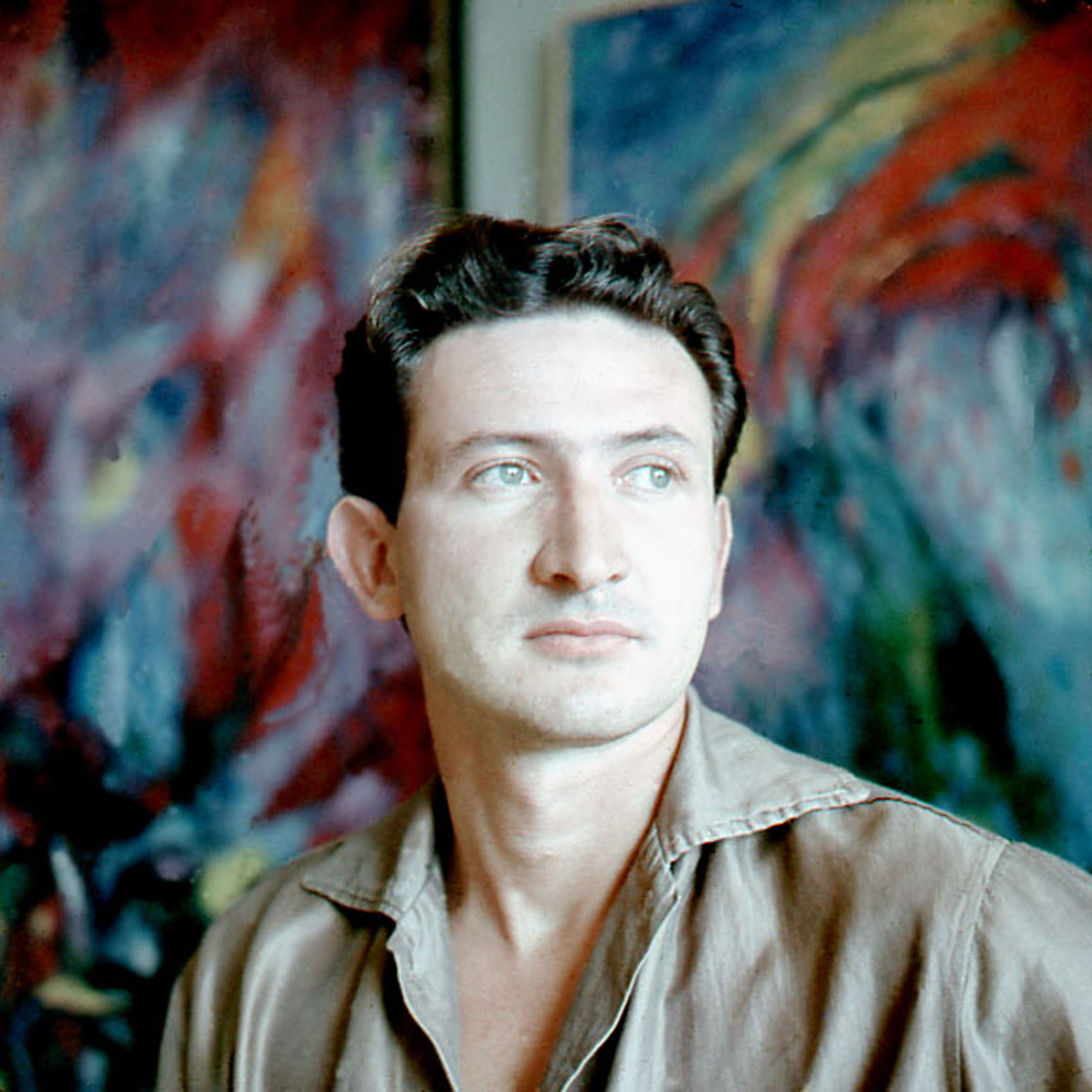
Agustín Fernández c. 1952.

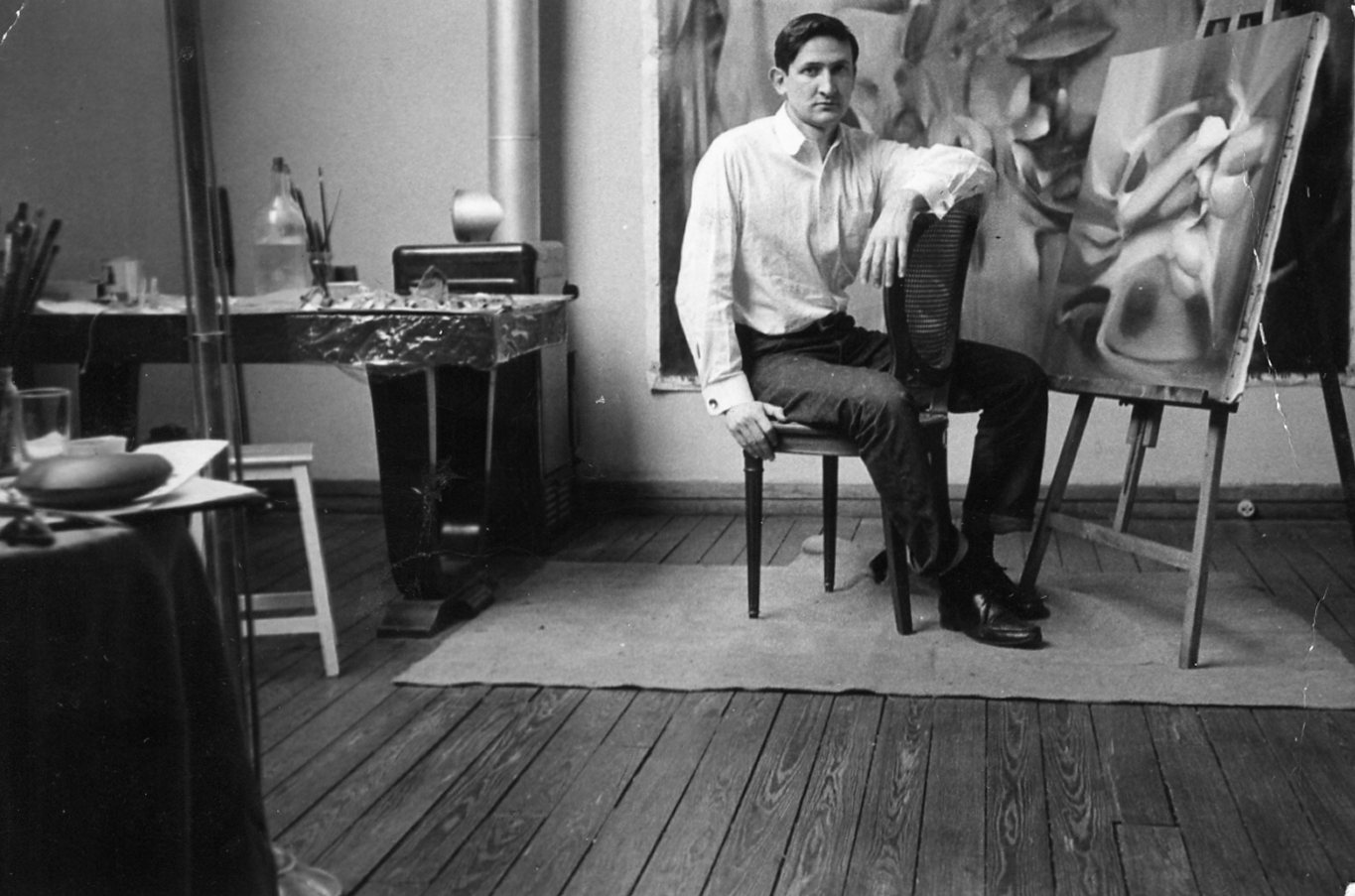
Fernández in his studio in Paris.

At the age of 11, in 1939, he took his first drawing lessons, soon entering the Jesuit-school Belén de Embarque, where he received painting classes. In 1944 he began studying at the art school La Anexa, and two years later he entered the San Alejandro National Academy of Fine Arts. He also pursued doctoral studies in philosophy and literature at the University of Havana, which he did not complete. After graduating from San Alejandro, he traveled to New York, where he studied with George Grosz and Yasuo Kuniyoshi at the Art Students League.

Back in Havana, he exhibited at the Ciudad Cultural Nuestro Tiempo, revealing himself as key emerging artists of the Cuban avant-garde. In 1953, he travels to France and Spain on the British ocean liner "Queen of the Pacific". For approximately two years he lives in Spain, attending courses at the Real Academia de Bellas Artes de San Fernando in Madrid. In 1953, and until 1955, he was part of the group Los Once. In this first period he exhibited his works in Madrid (Bucholz Gallery, 1953), Washington D.C. (Pan-American Union, 1954), New York (Acquisitions of painting and sculpture, MoMA, 1958), and Caracas (Museum of Fine Arts, 1959). He also participated in the IV and V Biennial of the Museum of Modern Art of Sao Paulo, receiving a mention in 1957.

== International career ==
Although Fernández began his career in his country, most of his works were made and exhibited abroad. In 1959, with the triumph of the Cuban Revolution, he received a scholarship to study in Paris. Due to political differences, Fernandez decided to go into exile in Paris. There he maintained contact with Simone Collinet - André Breton's first wife, who directed the Fürstenberg Gallery-as well as Roberto Matta, Joan Miró, Max Ernst, Alain Bosquet and Richard Wright. In 1967 he participated in MoMA's retrospective on Latin American art 1931-1966.

By 1969 he moved to San Juan, Puerto Rico, after obtaining a contract with La Casa del Arte gallery. He also exhibited 20 collages on silkscreen at the Colibri Gallery.

In 1972, he moved permanently to New York City. There he became friends with the photographer Robert Mapplethorpe. He exhibited in the following galleries, among others: Anita Shapolsky, Gimpel and Weitzenhoffer Gallery, ACA Gallery, Mitchell Algus and Nina Menocal Gallery, Mexico City. In New York he produced his famous group of paintings: Armors. Agustin Fernandez participated during his career in a variety of art fairs, among them: the May Salon, Paris Internationale, FIAC (Paris), Independent, Frieze (New York) and in Maastricht (Netherlands). In the period 1978-1979 he received a scholarship as a visual artist from the Cintas Foundation. In the 1990s he focused on developing a series of sculptural objects in which he returned to his surrealist essence. In 1992 Florida International University presented a major retrospective of his work.

Two paintings by Fernández have been featured in cinema: "Développement d'un délire" appeared in Brian De Palma's film Dressed to Kill (1980), and in The Father of the Bride (2022), starring Cuban American actor Andy Garcia.

== Private life ==
Agustín Fernández first married María Elena Molinet in 1952. A second marriage followed in 1961 to Lia Epelboim, who had escaped from Romania during the World War II. They had three children: Clodio, Clea and Sebastian. Fernández died on Thursday, June 2, 2006, in New York, at the age of 78, due to complications from pneumonia. Lia had died a few weeks earlier. By the time of his death, Fernández had had some thirty solo exhibitions and participated in over one hundred group exhibitions. He left unpublished memoirs in which he recounts his childhood and youth in Cuba, as well as the influences of masters such as Diego Velázquez in the development of his career as an artist.

== Solo exhibitions ==
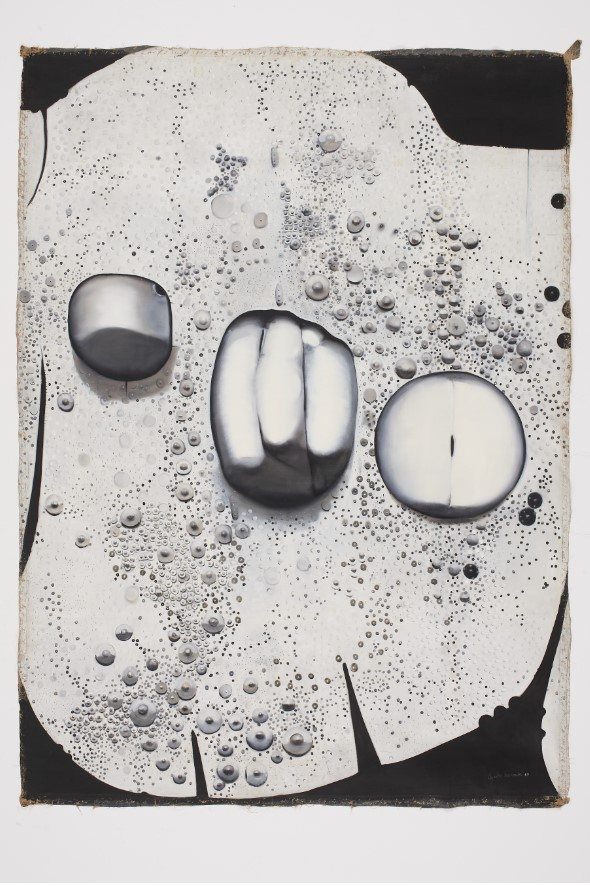
Looking at and Understanding Two Different Operations, 1963.

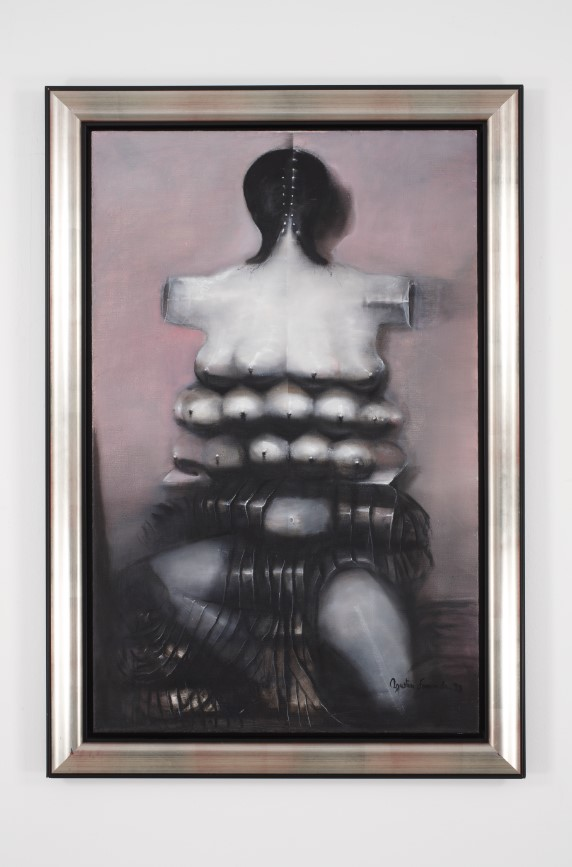
Untitled, 1998.

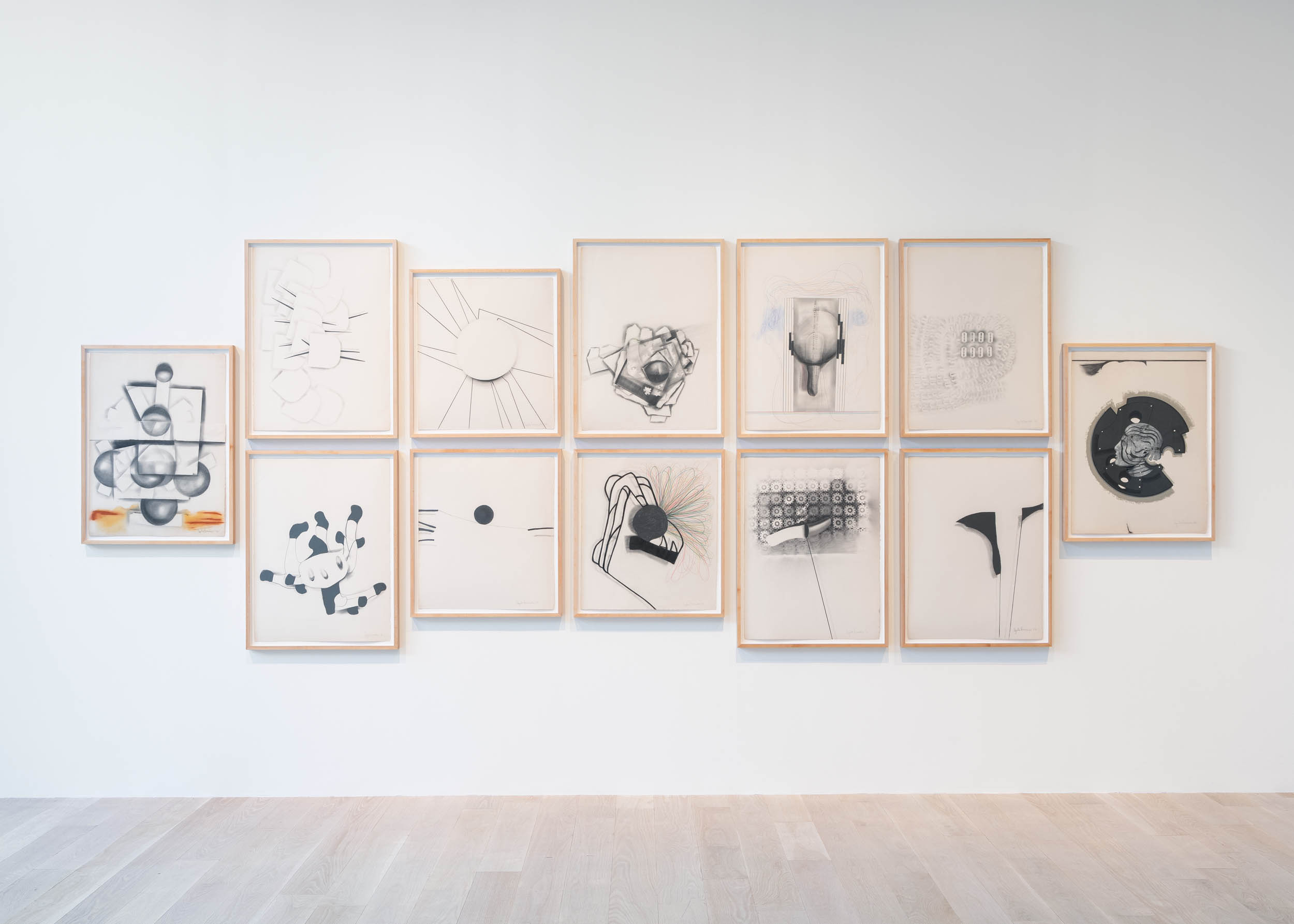

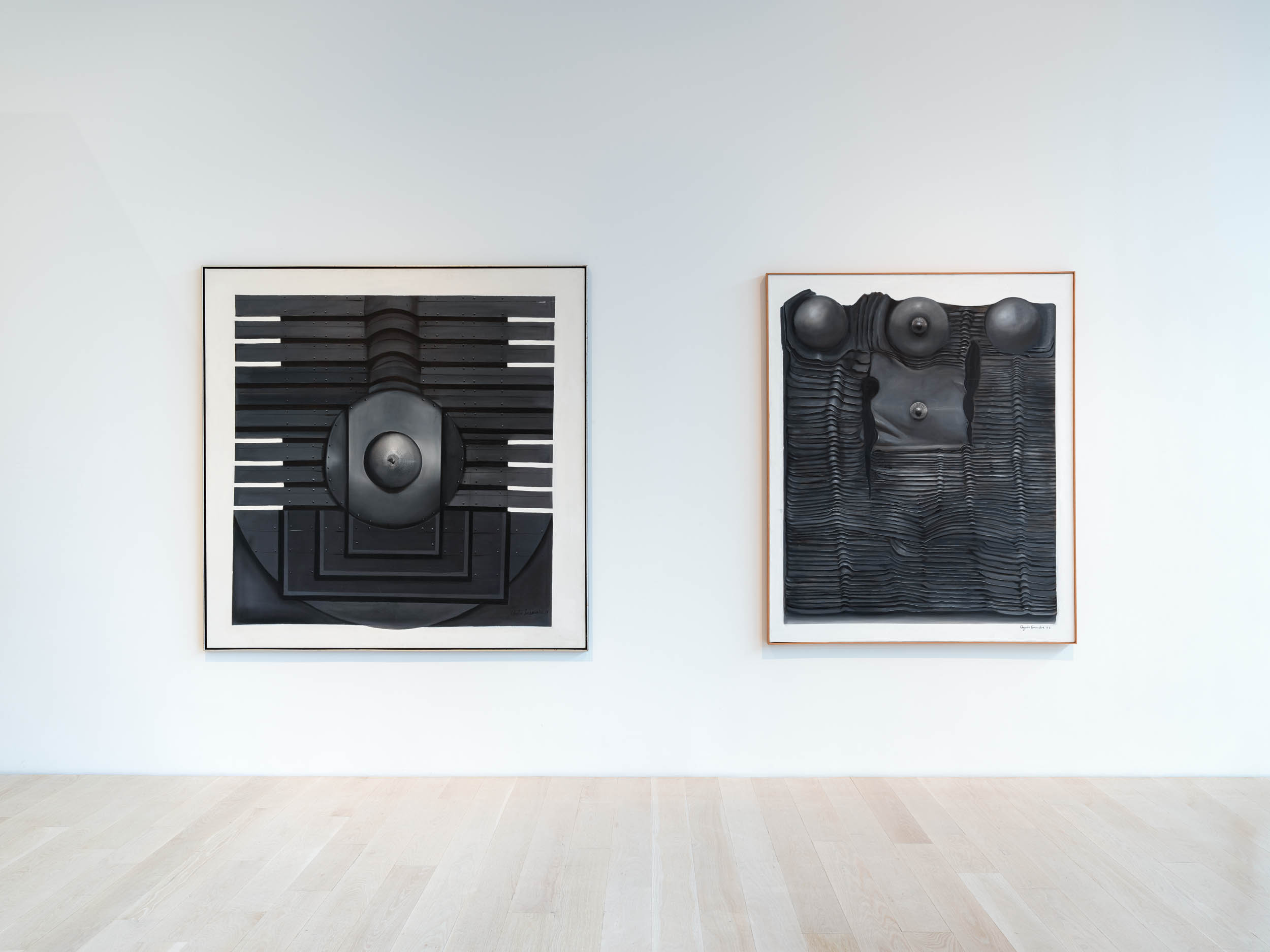
Two views of the exhibition Agustín Fernández: Armaduras, Instituto de Arte Contemporáneo (ICA).

- 1951: Agustín Fernández Expone Óleos, Galería Lyceum, Havana, Cuba.
- 1952: Agustín Fernández, Galería Sociedad Nuestro Tiempo, Havana, Cuba.
- 1953: Agustín Fernández, Galería Bucholz, Madrid, Spain, April 24-May 8
- 1954: Agustín Fernández: 15 Paintings, Pan American Union, Washington D.C.
  - Agustín Fernández: Óleos, Gouaches, Galería Lyceum, Havana, Cuba.
- 1955: Agustín Fernández, Duveen Graham Gallery, New York, October 17 November 5
- 1958: Agustín Fernández, Condon Riley Gallery, New York.
- 1959: Agustín Fernández: Pinturas y Dibujos, Museo de Bellas Artes, Caracas, Venezuela.
  - Agustín Fernández: Pinturas y Dibujos, Galería Contemporánea, Caracas, Venezuela.
  - Agustín Fernández: Pinturas y Dibujos, Circulo de Bellas Artes, Maracaibo, Venezuela.
  - Agustín Fernández, Bodley Gallery, New York.
- 1960: Agustín Fernández: Peintures Récentes, Galerie Fürstenberg, Paris.
- 1962: Agustín Fernández, Galleria Del Cavallino, Venice, Italy.
  - Agustín Fernández, Galerie Fürstenberg, Paris.
  - Agustín Fernández, Galleria Del Naviglio Milan, Italy.
- 1964: Agustín Fernández, Galerie Fürstenberg, Paris.
- 1966: Agustín Fernández, Objets-Tableaux, Galerie Jacqueline Ranson, Paris.
  - Agustín Fernández: Objects, Books, Engravings and Collages, Librairie Nicaise, Paris.
- 1968: Agustín Fernández: Pinturas y Dibujos, Galería La Casa del Arte, San Juan, Puerto Rico.
- 1969: Agustín Fernández, Walton Gallery, London.
- 1970: Agustín Fernández: Oleos, Dibujos, Grabados, Galería La Casa del Arte, San Juan, Puerto Rico.
- 1973: Agustín Fernández: Collages, Colibrí Gallery, San Juan, Puerto Rico.
  - Agustín Fernández: Retrospectiva, Museo de la Universidad de Puerto Rico, Rio Piedras.
- 1974: Agustín Fernández: Retrospectiva, at the Galería Las Américas, in San Juan, Puerto Rico
- 1976: Agustín Fernández, Gimpel and Weitzenhoffer Gallery, New York.
  - Agustín Fernández, Gallery 24 Collection, Miami, Florida.
  - Agustín Fernández: Retrospective, Metropolitan Museum and Art Center.
- 1979: Agustín Fernández: Recent Paintings and Drawings, ACA Gallery, New York.
- 1980: Agustín Fernández: Recent Works, Robert Samuel Gallery, New York.
- 1982: Agustín Fernández: Drawings, at the Osuna Gallery, Washington D.C.
- 1989: Agustín Fernández, Galerie Fürstenberg, Paris.
- 1992: Agustín Fernández: A Retrospective, The Art Museum, Florida International University, Miami, Florida.
- 1994: Agustín Fernández: Oleos y Dibujos 1969 1994, Galería Nina Menocal, México D.F.
- 1999: Four Latin American Masters: Agustín Fernández, Perez Celis, Antonio Seguí, Oswaldo Vigas, Anita Shapolsky Gallery, New York.
- 2000: Agustín Fernández: Large Paintings, Signal 66 Gallery, Washington D.C.
- 2001: Agustín Fernández: An Exhibit of Recent Works, Aroca Gallery, Miami, Florida.
- 2005: Agustín Fernández: Paintings, Drawings, Sculpture, Collage: 1960-2005, Mitchell Algus Gallery, New York.
- 2008: Agustín Fernández: Translating Martí, West Dade Regional Library, Miami, Florida.
- 2013: Form’s Transgressions: The Drawings of Agustin Fernandez. The Patricia and Philip Frost Art Museum, Florida International University, Miami Florida, and the Snite Museum of Art, University of Notre Dame, Indiana.
- 2014: Agustin Fernandez: Ultimate Surrealist. The American University Museum, Katzen Arts Center, Washington DC.
- 2015: Agustin Fernandez: Paintings and Works on Paper. Mitchell Algus Gallery, New York, New York.
- 2016: Agustin Fernandez: Paintings and Works on Paper. The Independent New York, presented by Mitchell Algus Gallery, New York, New York.
  - Agustin Fernandez, Paris Internationale Art Fair, Paris, presented by Mitchell Algus Gallery, New York, New York.
- 2017: Paintings and Works on Paper by Agustin Fernandez. Frieze Art Fair, New York, presented by Mitchell Algus Gallery, New York, New York.
- 2018: Agustin Fernandez: Paradoxe de la Jouissance, Marie du IVeme arrondissement, Paris, France.
  - Hole in the Wall, Leon Tovar Gallery, New York, New York.
- 2019: Master Drawings, Leon Tovar Gallery, New York, New York.
  - Armaduras, Institute of Contemporary Art, Miami, Miami Beach, Florida.
- 2021: Agustin Fernandez, Independent Art Fair, New York, presented by Mitchell Algus Gallery, New York, New York.
  - Agustin Fernandez: Drawings and Collages, Mitchell Algus Gallery, New York, New York.
- 2022: Master Drawings, Leon Tovar Gallery, New York, New York.

== Collections ==
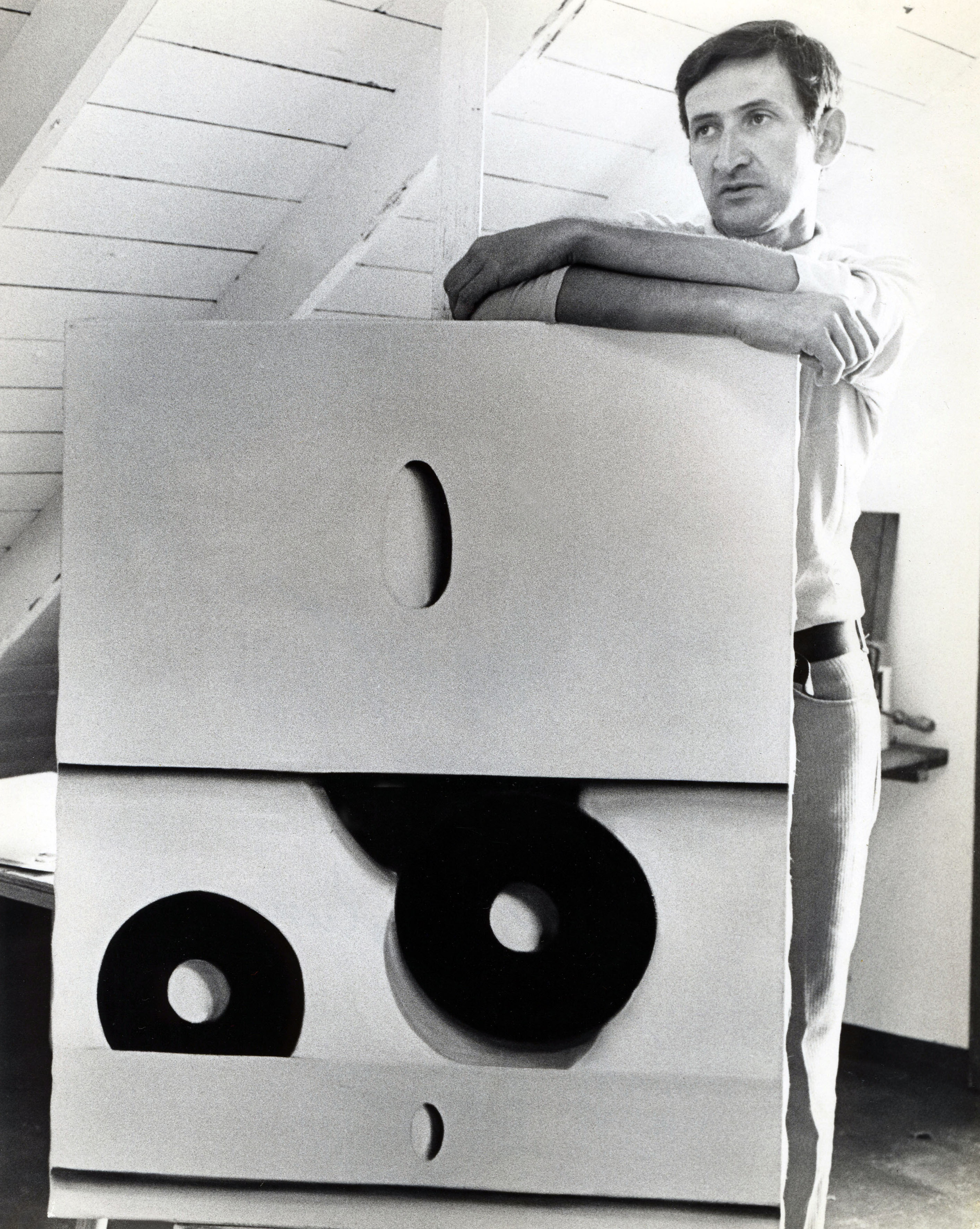
Fernández with one of his paintings.

- Art Museum of the Americas
- Brooklyn Museum of Art
- Cabinet des Estampes
- Cintas Foundation
- Círculo de Bellas Artes
- El Museo del Barrio
- Godwin-Ternbach Museum
- Jack S. Blanton Museum of Art
- JP Morgan Chase Collection
- Lowe Art Museum
- Miami-Dade Public Library
- Museo de Arte Moderno La Tertulia
- Museo de Arte de Ponce, Ponce
- Museo Nacional de Bellas Artes
- Museum of Art, Nova Southern University
- Museum of Latin American Art
- Museum of Modern Art
- Newark Museum
- New Mexico Museum of Art
- New York Public Library
- Snite Museum of Art
- Saint Thomas University Library
- The Frost Art Museum
- The Patrick Lannan Foundation
- Tucson Museum of Art
- University of Texas-Pan American
- Utah Museum of Fine Arts
- Victoria and Albert Museum
- Worcester Art Museum
- Yale University Art Gallery
