= Jorge Lemus =

Argentine politician

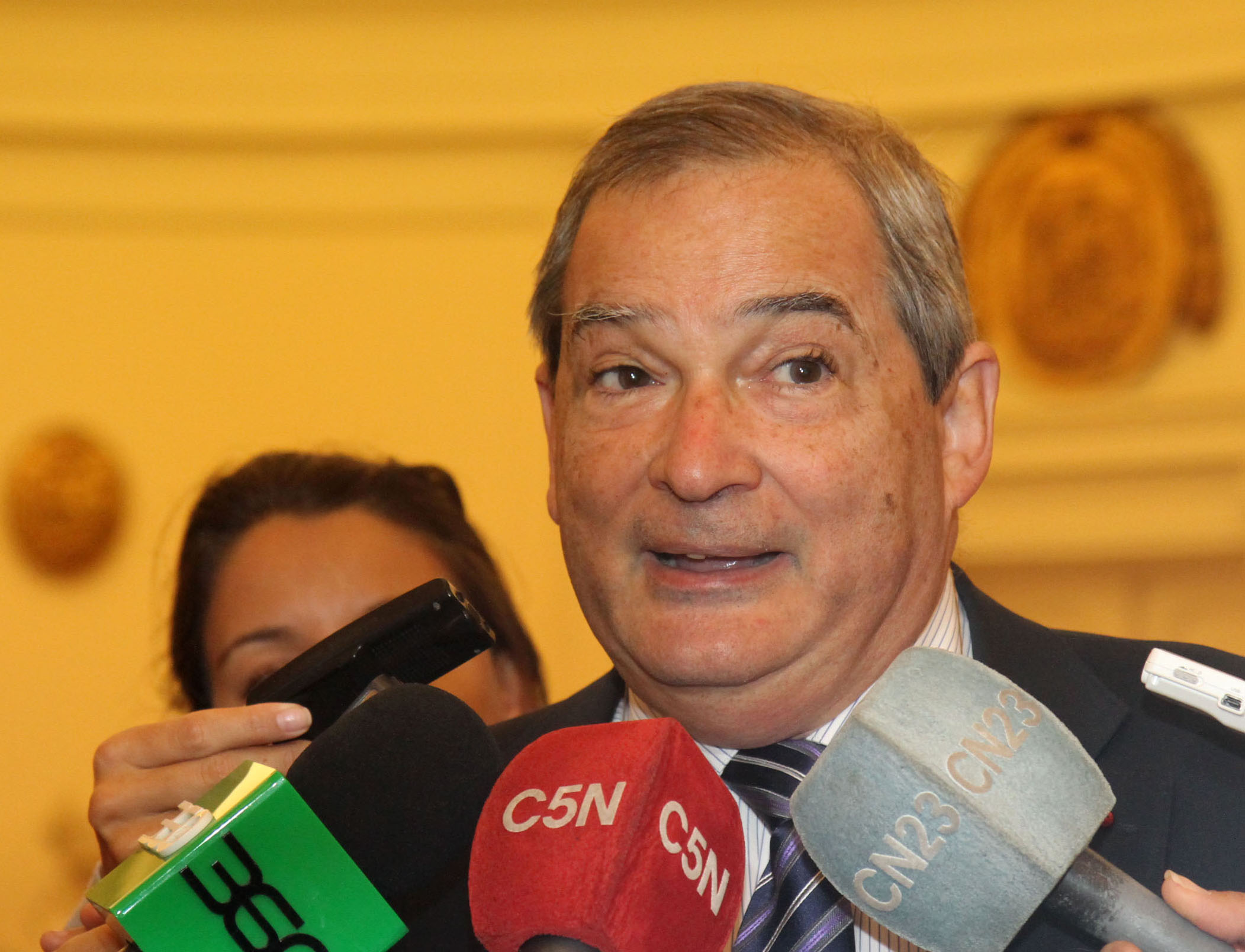
Jorge Lemus

Jorge Lemus (born June 9, 1948, Buenos Aires) is an Argentine politician. He was appointed minister of health of Buenos Aires in 2007, under mayor Mauricio Macri. He resigned in 2012, but stayed in the Republican Proposal party. Macri won the 2015 elections, and appointed him national minister of health.
