= La Gaceta (Tucumán) =

Daily newspaper based in Tucumán, Argentina

- Type: Daily newspaper
- Format: Broadsheet
- Owner(s): Grupo García Hamilton
- Publisher: Alberto García Hamilton
- Founded: 1912
- Political alignment: Conservatism
- Headquarters: Tucumán, Argentina
- Circulation: 46,000
- Website: La Gaceta

La Gaceta is a daily newspaper founded in San Miguel de Tucumán, Argentina, and the most prominent in the Argentine Northwest.

== Spot ==
La Gaceta Salta spot.

== History ==
=== Editorial stance ===
La Gaceta was established on August 4, 1912, by Alberto García Hamilton, an Uruguayan publisher who left for neighboring Argentina following a political dispute. La Gaceta earned a reputation for conservatism, and was opposed to populist leader Hipólito Yrigoyen during the 1920s, as well as to the pro-development administration of Arturo Frondizi, who had the paper censored in 1960.

=== Design and format ===
The daily has historically been among the most modern in the region, being the first in South America to use offset printing, and the first to be fully computerized and use the largest newspaper format characterized by long vertical pages called broadsheet. It is currently the largest and most influential newspaper in Tucumán Province, and is considered to be one of the main dailies in the country, outside Buenos Aires. In 1995, the daily's design was renewed and color was incorporated. As a result, La Gaceta has been awarded several international prizes ever since.

Gacenet, La Gaceta's online edition, was created in 1999.

There is a local version of the newspaper for the Salta Province since August 4, 2014.

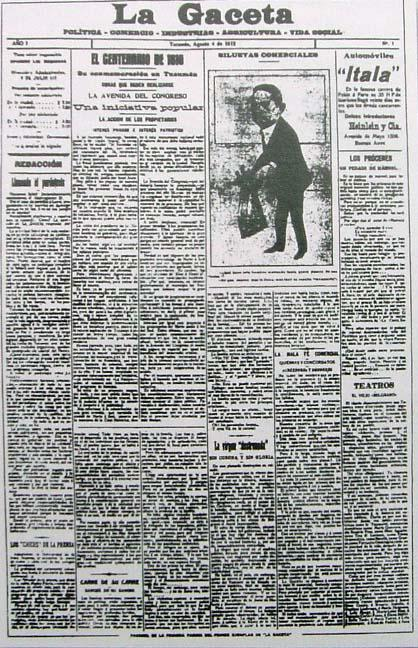
La Gaceta's first frontpage (August 4, 1912)

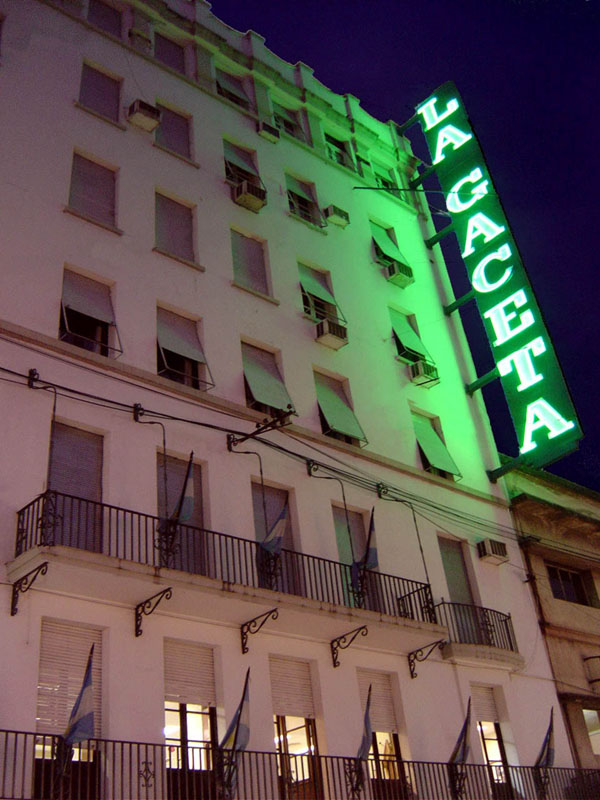
Headquarters in San Miguel de Tucumán
