= Law of Bases and Starting Points for the Freedom of Argentines =

Argentine Omnibus bill proposed by Javier Milei in 2023

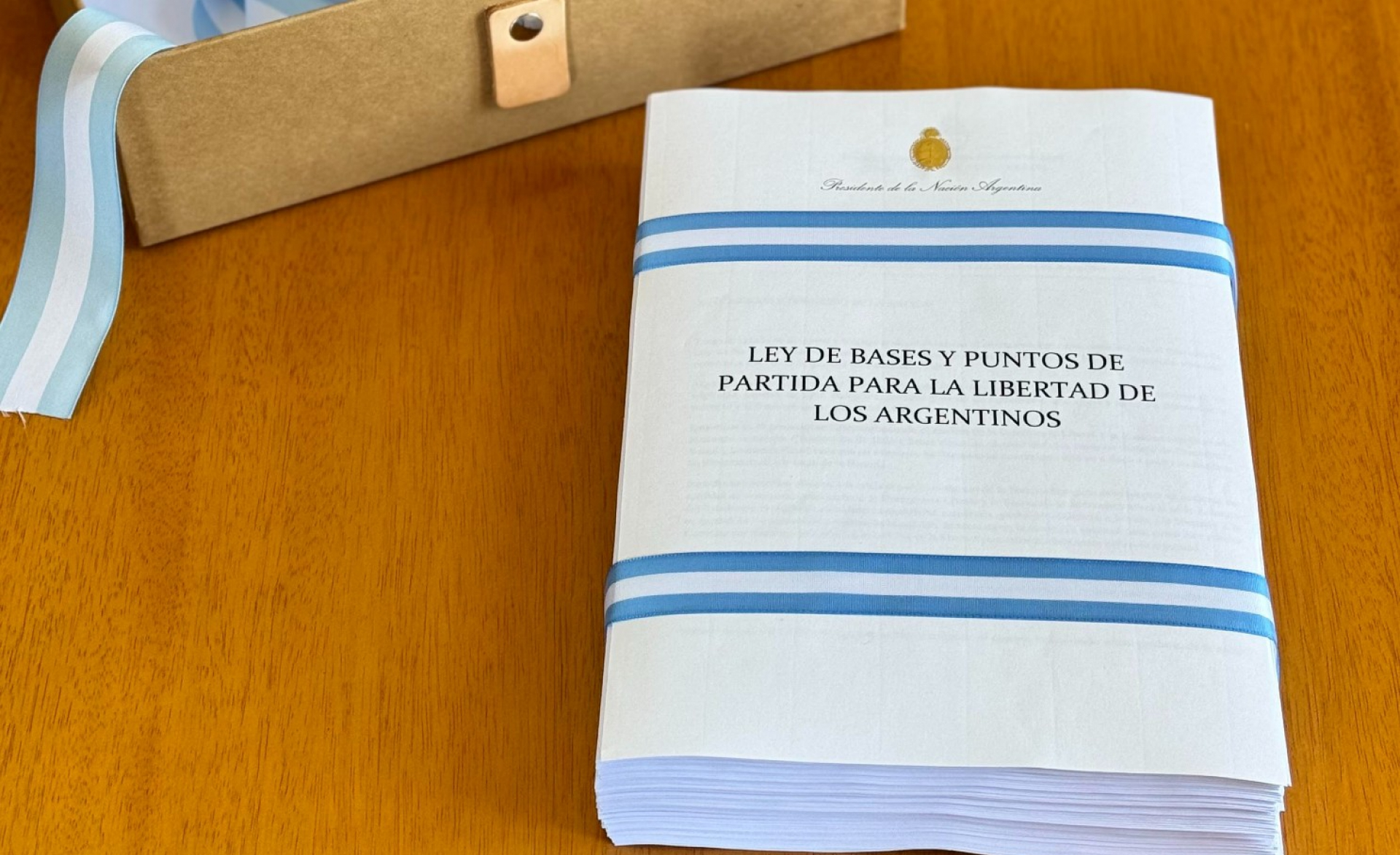

The Law of Bases and Starting Points for the Freedom of Argentines is an extensive economic reform omnibus bill proposed by Argentine President Javier Milei on 27 December 2023. It was passed in the Argentine Senate and returned to the chamber of deputies on 12 June 2024, in a 36-36 tie broken by vice president Victoria Villarruel. The Argentine Chamber of Deputies voted in favor of the bill 147-107 on June 27th along with associated financial reform passing 136-116.

== Background ==
The original bill contained 664 articles, which were modified into a bill with 232 articles. Changes to the original bill included restoring an income tax that was eliminated in 2023, reducing the number of companies privatized, lowering the number of different public emergencies, and modifying a proposed retirement mobility formula.

== Content ==
Provisions in the bill include:

=== Emergency ===
- Conserves the ability to make public emergency declarations, specifically limiting it to issues related to administration, economy, finance, and energy for a one year period.
- Adds that the Federal Executive report to the Federal Legislature monthly about what actions the delegated powers are doing and the results of the actions in detail.

=== State Reform ===
- Grants the Federal Executive the power to modify and reorganize state departments, state-owned companies and societies, trust funds, and certain decentralized agencies.
- Totally or partially privatizes several state-owned companies, including "Aerolíneas Argentinas S.A., Energía Argentina S.A., Radio y Televisión Argentina S.E., Aguas y Saneamiento Argentino S.A., Correo Oficial de la República Argentina S.A., and Corredores Viales S.A.".

=== Contracts ===
- Empowers the Federal executive to renegotiate or cancel contracts for construction and public works or for supplying goods and services, excluding contracts for "privatization processes, activity promotion regimes, investment, or production stimulus programs".

=== Energy ===
- Grants the Federal Executive the power to adapt laws related to electricity and electrical regulatory frameworks.
- Creates environmental legislation for hydrocarbon exploration and distribution.
- Creates the Federal Regulatory Authority for Gas and Electricity to replace the Federal Electricity Regulatory Authority and the Federal Gas Regulatory Authority.

=== Investments ===
- Creates the “Incentive Regime for Large Investments” that establishes and organizes "Large Investments" for the interest of the nation, its provinces, and its municipalities.
- Renders null and void any local or national measures that limits or "distorts" what is established.

== Protests ==
The omnibus bill was strongly opposed by many leftist political parties, labor unions, and social organizations for limiting labor rights and promoting heavy tax breaks and tariffs in favor of large corporations.

On 12 June, protests erupted in downtown Buenos Aires as the bill was being deliberated in the Senate. Protesters used molotov cocktails, sticks, stones, and other objects to throw at police officers and riot police, and also used gasoline to burn down two cars outside of Congress. Police used water cannons, rubber bullet guns, tear gas canisters, and pepper spray to repel protesters and force them to disperse. At least 20 police officers were injured and over a dozen protesters were arrested. Among the protesters were labor union workers, pensioners, teachers, bankers, and truckers.

Milei's government condemned the rioters as "terrorists" who by interrupting the Congress deliberation were "attempting to carry out a coup d’état".
