= Aguilares, Argentina =

Aguilares
- City
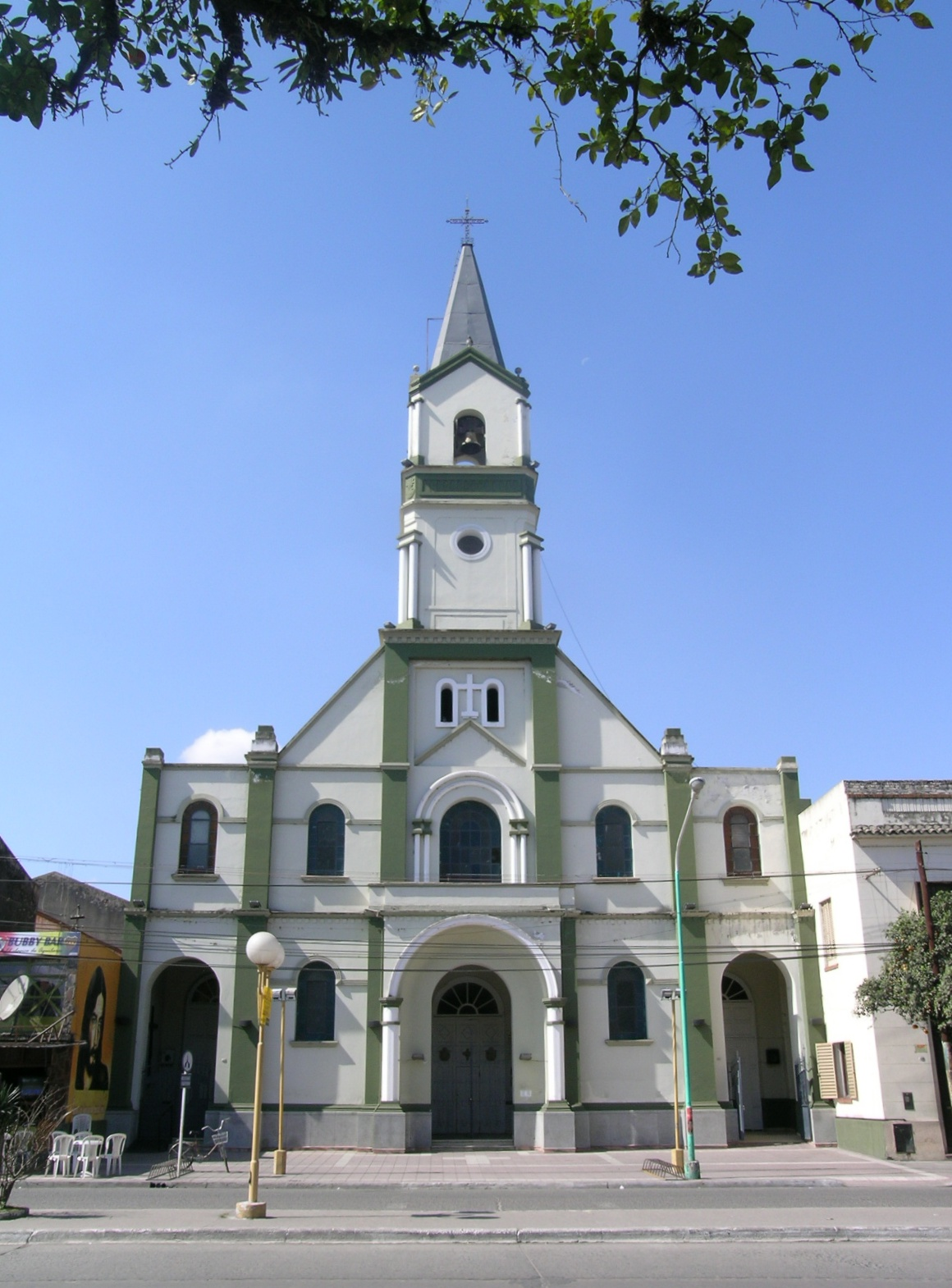
- Parish of the Virgin of Carmen

- Location of Aguilares in Argentina
- Coordinates: 27°26′S 65°37′W
- Country: Argentina
- Province: Tucumán
- Department: Río Chico

Government
  - Intendant: Gimena Mansilla (PJ)
- Elevation: 333 m (1,093 ft)

Population (2010 census)
  - Total: 32,097
- Demonym: aguilarense
- Time zone: UTC−3 (ART)
- CPA base: T4152
- Dialing code: +54 3865
- Climate: Cfa
- Website: Official website

Aguilares is a city in the south of the Tucumán Province, Argentina. It is the largest urban area in the Rio Chico Department, as well as the department seat.

Located 85 km (53 mi) south of the provincial capital, San Miguel de Tucumán, the city extends along route 38, and between the Medinas River (in the north) and the Barrientos Creek (in the south).

Like many cities in Argentina, there are many plazas and parks where people enjoy mate. In the main plaza there is a church (see the above picture) to one side of the plaza facing west. Surrounding the plaza there are many small stores and cafes. On special holidays or events, these plazas become the center of celebrations or fairs.

== History ==
The city was established in 1888 by Governor Lídoro Quinteros. Two important sugar mills (Aguilares and Santa Barbara) and a large footwear factory (Alpargatas SAIC) along with a very dynamic agricultural activity in its surrounding area, account for the city's economic cornerstones.

== Notable people ==
- María Simón (1922–2009), sculptor
