= Saint Thomas Aquinas University of the North =

Coordinates: 26°49′58″S 65°12′21″W

Universidad del Norte Santo Tomás de Aquino
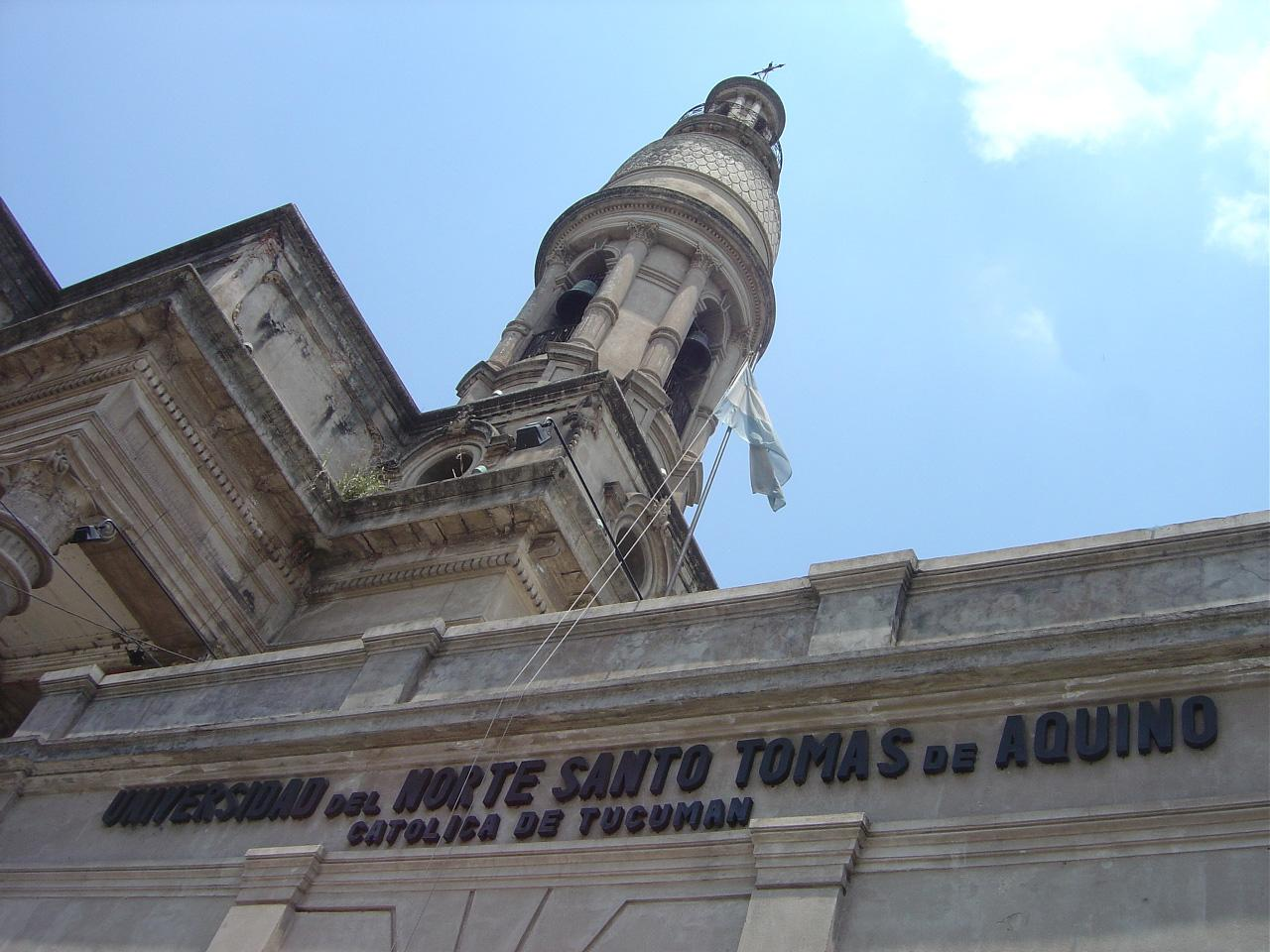
- Motto: Univer Cath Thom æ Aqvi
- Type: Private
- Established: August 6, 1965
- Chancellor: Fray Javier Posse OP
- President: Dr.
- Location: San Miguel de Tucumán, Argentina
- Website: www.unsta.edu.ar

The Universidad del Norte de Santo Tomás de Aquino (Saint Thomas Aquinas North University, UNSTA) is a Catholic university located in San Miguel de Tucumán, Tucumán province, Argentina.
