= Juan Luis Manzur =

Argentine politician

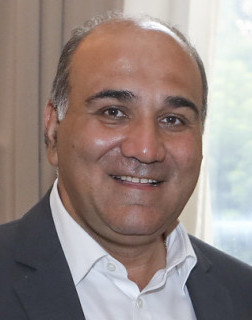

National Senator
- Incumbent
- Assumed office 10 December 2023
- Constituency: Tucumán

Governor of Tucumán
- In office 29 October 2015 – September 21, 2021
- Vice Governor: Osvaldo Jaldo
- Preceded by: José Alperovich
- In office February 23, 2023 – October 29, 2023
- Vice Governor: Osvaldo Jaldo
- Preceded by: Osvaldo Jaldo (interim)
- Succeeded by: Osvaldo Jaldo

Chief of the Cabinet of Ministers
- In office 20 September 2021 – 15 February 2023
- President: Alberto Fernández
- Preceded by: Santiago Cafiero
- Succeeded by: Agustin Rossi

Vice Governor of Tucumán
- In office 27 February 2015 – 29 October 2015
- Governor: José Alperovich
- Preceded by: Regino Amado
- Succeeded by: Osvaldo Jaldo
- In office 10 December 2007 – 1 July 2009
- Governor: José Alperovich
- Preceded by: Fernando Juri
- Succeeded by: Sergio Mansilla

Minister of Health
- In office 1 July 2009 – 26 February 2015
- President: Cristina Fernández de Kirchner
- Preceded by: Graciela Ocaña
- Succeeded by: Daniel Gollán

Minister of Health of Tucumán
- In office 10 December 2003 – 10 December 2007
- Governor: José Alperovich
- Succeeded by: Pablo Yedlin

Personal details
- Born: January 8, 1969 (age 57) San Miguel de Tucumán, Argentina
- Party: Justicialist Party
- Other political affiliations: Front for Victory (2003–2015); Frente de Todos (2019–present)
- Education: National University of Tucumán; University of Buenos Aires

Juan Luis Manzur (Spanish pronunciation: [ˈxwan ˈlwis manˈsuɾ]; born 8 January 1969) is an Argentine surgeon and politician currently serving as a National Senator for Tucumán Province. A member of the Justicialist Party, he previously served as Chief of the Cabinet of Ministers from 2021 to 2023, under President Alberto Fernández. He previously served as Minister of Health of Argentina from 2009 to 2015, and as Governor of Tucumán from 2015 to 2021.

== Early life and education ==
Manzur was born in San Miguel de Tucumán to a Maronite Catholic father from Lebanon and an Argentine mother. He received a medical degree from the University of Tucumán and completed his residency at the public Álvarez Hospital, in Buenos Aires. Manzur later received a master's degree in Health Systems and Services Administration from the University of Buenos Aires.

== Political career ==
Following a stint as Vice Minister of Health for the Province of San Luis, in 2002 he was named Public Health Secretary of the District of La Matanza, a western, mainly blue-collar suburb of the Argentine capital. Recommended by the National Health Minister, Ginés González García, Manzur was appointed Health Minister of Tucumán Province by the new Governor, José Alperovich, in 2003. Manzur soon earned plaudits in his post, which oversaw public health in one of Argentina's least-developed provinces. One widely used yardstick of public health, the infant mortality rate, fell from 23 per 1,000 births (40% above the national average) in 2003, to 13 in 2006 (matching the national average). The perinatal mortality rate (a late fetal death, or of an infant under one week old) likewise fell during the same period in Tucumán from 24 to 18 per 1,000 births. These news helped Manzur secure Governor Alperovich's nod to be a running mate for his successful, 2007 bid for re-election.

=== Health minister ===
Manzur was sworn in on July 1, the day after a public health emergency was declared over a worsening H1N1 virus ("swine flu") epidemic, which had claimed 44 fatalities by the time he was sworn in. His tenure would thereafter be focused on expanding childhood immunizations, childhood preventive medicine, diagnostic care against coeliac disease and HPV, mobile health, access to organ transplants, and smoking cessation programs. Staunch opposition from the powerful Roman Catholic Church in Argentina forced Manzur to reverse steps toward protecting women's reproductive rights, cancelling proposals in 2010 that would have guarantee access to legal abortions.

He stepped down as Health Minister in February 2015 to return to the post of Vice Governor of Tucumán, and was expected to run to succeed Governor Alperovich in provincial elections later in the year.

=== Cabinet Chief ===
On 20 September 2021, Manzur was appointed Chief of the Cabinet of Ministers by President Alberto Fernández in replacement of Santiago Cafiero. Manzur's appointment was part of a cabinet reshuffle following the government's poor showings in the 2021 legislative primary elections. Manzur did not resign from his position as governor of Tucumán, instead taking a leave of office while vice governor Osvaldo Jaldo assumed interim executive powers.

Political offices
Preceded by Graciela Ocaña	Minister of Health; 2009–2015	Succeeded by Daniel Gollán
Preceded by José Alperovich	Governor of Tucumán; 2015–2021	Succeeded by Osvaldo Jaldo
Preceded by Santiago Cafiero	Chief of the Cabinet of Ministers; 2021–2023	Succeeded by Agustin Rossi
