= Pablo Yedlin =

Argentine politician

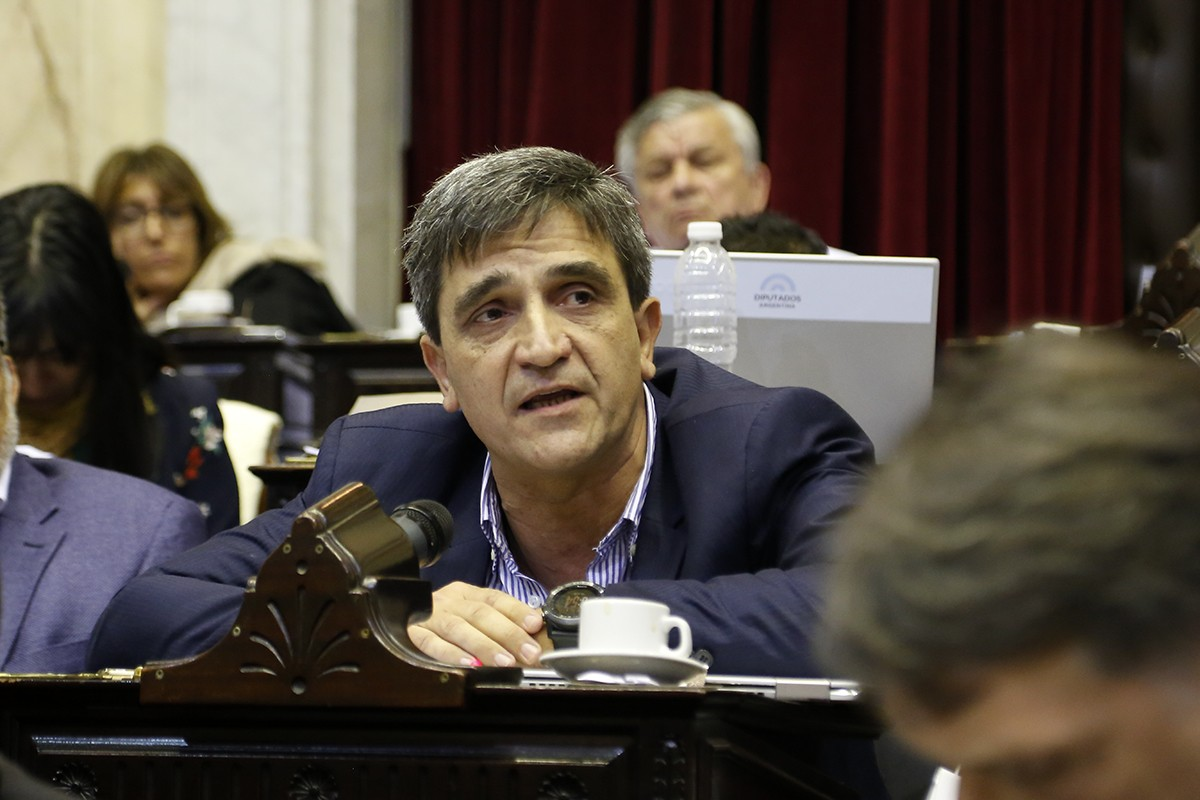

National Deputy
- Incumbent
- Assumed office 10 December 2023
- Constituency: Tucumán
- In office 10 December 2017 – 10 December 2021
- Constituency: Tucumán

National Senator
- In office 10 December 2021 – 10 December 2023
- Succeeded by: Juan Luis Manzur
- Constituency: Tucumán

Minister of Public Health of Tucumán
- In office 29 October 2007 – 29 October 2015
- Governor: José Alperovich
- Preceded by: Juan Luis Manzur
- Succeeded by: Rossana Chahla

Personal details
- Born: 16 July 1966 (age 60) San Miguel de Tucumán, Argentina
- Party: Justicialist Party
- Other political affiliations: Front for Victory (2007–2017); Frente de Todos (2019–2023); Union for the Homeland (2023–present)
- Education: National University of Tucumán

Pablo Raúl Yedlin (born 16 July 1966) is an Argentine physician and politician, currently serving as a National Deputy since 2023. He previously held the same position from 2017 to 2021.

Yedlin served as Minister of Public Health of Tucumán Province under Governor José Alperovich and as General Secretary of Government under Governor Juan Luis Manzur. From 2021 to 2023 he was a National Senator. He is a member of the Justicialist Party.

== Early life and career ==
Yedlin was born on 16 July 1966 in San Miguel de Tucumán. He studied medicine at the National University of Tucumán, graduating in 1990. Starting in 1995, he was the resident pediatrician at the Sanatorio Parque in San Miguel de Tucumán, and had a similar post at the Sanatorio 9 de Julio starting in 2001.

He is married to Viviana Nieman and has three children. His brother, Gabriel Yedlin, is also a politician and served in the Chamber of Deputies and as a provincial minister as well.

== Political career ==
In 2003, Yedlin was appointed Secretary of Coordination at the Ministry of Public Health of Tucumán Province by Governor José Alperovich. The following year, he was appointed Medical Executive Secretary of the Provincial Health System. In 2007, Yedlin was appointed Minister of Public Health, succeeding Juan Luis Manzur. Under Yedlin's administration, Tucumán inaugurated the Néstor Kirchner Hospital in the provincial capital in 2014.

In 2015, following the election of Manzur as Governor of Tucumán, Yedlin was appointed General Secretary of Government.

=== National Deputy ===
Yedlin ran for a seat in the Chamber of Deputies in the 2017 legislative election, as the third candidate in the Justicialist Front list in Tucumán (behind then-Vice Governor Osvaldo Jaldo and Gladys Medina). The list was the most voted in the general election with 46.89% of the vote, but it still did not receive enough votes for Yedlin to be elected. He took office on nevertheless, as Jaldo never resigned from the vice-governorship. Yedlin formed part of the Justicialist Bloc, within the Federal Argentina inter-bloc. Following the 2019 election, Yedlin became part of the Frente de Todos bloc.

As a national deputy, Yedlin formed part of the parliamentary commissions on Social Action and Public Health (of which he was appointed president), Human Rights and Guarantees, General Legislation and Prevention of Addictions. He was a supporter of the 2020 Voluntary Interruption of Pregnancy bill, which legalized abortion in Argentina. He also pushed for the unanimous approval of the new Law on Vaccines (Law 27.491), the Law on Digital Prescriptions (Law 27.553) and the law on COVID-19 vaccine acquisition (Law 27.573).

Ahead of the 2021 primary election, Yedlin was confirmed as the first Senator candidate in the Frente de Todos list in Tucumán.
