= Governor of Tucumán Province =

- Provincial coat of Arms
- Incumbent; Osvaldo Jaldo since 29 October 2023
- Style: Governor
- Status: Head of the local government
- Appointer: Direct popular vote
- Inaugural holder: Ernesto Padilla
- Formation: 1913

This is a list of governors of Tucumán Province, Argentina, after its separation in 1814 from the Municipality of Salta del Tucumán.

== Civil war ==
Term	Governor	Portrait	Notes
October 1814 – September 1817	Bernabé Aráoz		Formerly governor of Salta del Tucumán
September 1817 – November 1819	Feliciano de la Mota Botello		Appointed by the Directory
November 1819 – November 1821	Bernabé Aráoz		Chosen after a revolution, President of Republic of Tucumán
November – 10 January 1822	Abraham González		Took power in coup
10 January 1822 – 9 February 1822	José Víctor Posse		Elected by the council
February 1822 – October 1822	Chaotic situation		Several short term governors including Diego Aráoz
October 1822 – August 1823	Bernabé Aráoz		
August 1823 – ?September 1824	Diego Aráoz		
?September 1824 – ?February 1825	Nicolás Laguna		
February 1825 – 26 November 1825	Javier López		
26 November 1825 – 25 November 1826	Gregorio Aráoz de Lamadrid		Unitarian Party, overthrew López
25 November 1826	Nicolás Laguna		Federalist, named after the defeat of Lamadrid
25 November 1826 – 12 July 1827	Gregorio Aráoz de Lamadrid		
12 July 1827 – 20 February 1828	Nicolás Laguna		Federalist, named after the defeat of Lamadrid in the Rincón de Valladares.
20 February 1828 – 20 January 1829	José Manuel Silva		Unitarian Party
20 January 1829 – 20 February 1829	Manuel Lacoa		Unitarian Party
20 February 1829 – 14 April 1829	Javier López		Unitarian Party
14 April 1829 – 9 December 1829	Javier Paz		Interim
9 December 1829 –	Javier López		Unitarian Party
22 February 1831 – 1832	José Frías		Interim
1832 – 12 November 1838	Alejandro Heredia		Federalist, reelected twice, killed in pursuit of his government
November 1838 – December 1840	Bernabé Piedrabuena		Unitarian Party
December 1840 – January 1841	Pedro de Garmendia		Unitarian Party
January 1841 – 23 May 1841	Gregorio Aráoz de Lamadrid,		Unitarian Party
23 May 1841 – 14 November 1841	Marco Avellaneda,		Unitarian Party
14 November 1841 – 14 June 1852	Celedonio Gutiérrez		Federalist, reelected several times
14 June 1852 – 16 January 1853	Manuel Alejandro Espinosa		Unitarian Party
16 January 1853 – 23 October 1853	Celedonio Gutiérrez		Federalist, returned to office through a revolution
23 October 1853 – 9 April 1856	José María del Campo		Unitarian Party, Priest
9 April 1856 – 14 September 1856	Anselmo Rojo		Unitarian Party
14 September 1856 – 16 May 1858	Agustín Justo de la Vega		Unitarian Party
16 May 1858 – 16 March 1860	Marcos Paz		Unitarian Party
16 March 1860 – 31 August 1861	Salustiano Zavalía		Unitarian Party
31 August 1861 – 7 July 1861	Benjamín Villafañe		Unitarian Party
7 July 1861 – 17 December 1861	Juan Manuel Terán		Federalist

== Liberal / autonomist ==
Term	Governor	Portrait	Notes
17 December 1861 – 10 April 1864	José María del Campo		Mitrista
10 April 1864 – 10 April 1866	José Posse		
10 April 1866 – 30 June 1867	Wenceslao Posse		Mitrista.
30 June 1867 – 2 September 1869	Octavio Luna		Autonomista.
2 September 1869 – 6 December 1869	Belisario López		Autonomista.
6 December 1869 – 7 February 1871	Uladislao Frías		Autonomista.
7 February 1871 – 9 December 1873	Federico Helguera		Autonomista.
9 December 1873 – 6 December 1875	Belisario López		Autonomista.
6 December 1875 – 10 October 1877	Tiburcio Padilla		Autonomista.
10 October 1877 – 12 October 1878	Federico Helguera		Autonomista.
12 October 1878 – 12 October 1880	Domingo Martínez Muñecas		
12 October 1880 – 12 October 1882	Miguel M. Nougués		
12 October 1882 – 12 October 1884	Benjamín Paz		Autonomista.
12 October 1884 – 3 September 1886	Santiago Gallo		Autonomista.
3 September 1886 – 12 June 1887	Juan Posse		Autonomista.
12 June 1887 – 10 July 1887	Salustiano Zavalía		Federal interventor.
10 July 1887 – 17 June 1890	Lidoro Quinteros		Autonomista.
17 June 1890 – 16 November 1890	Silvano Bores		Interino.
16 November 1890 – 1893	Próspero García		Autonomista.
1893	Eugenio Méndez		Radical revolutionary.
1893 – 20 February 1894	Domingo Teófilo Pérez		Federal interventor.
20 February 1894 – 28 November 1895	Benjamín Aráoz		Autonomista, died in office.
28 November 1895 – 1898	Lucas Córdoba		Autonomista.
1898–1901	Próspero Mena		Autonomista.
1901 – 4 October 1904	Lucas Córdoba		Autonomista.
4 October 1904 – 1905	José Antonio Olmos		Autonomista.
1905 – 2 April 1906	Domingo Teófilo Pérez		Federal interventor.
2 April 1906 – 2 April 1909	Luis Nougués		Autonomista.
2 April 1909 – 2 April 1913	José Frías Silva		Autonomista.
2 April 1913 – 2 April 1917	Ernesto Padilla		Autonomista

== 20th century ==
Term	Governor	Portrait	Notes
2 April 1917 – 26 December 1920	Juan Bautista Bascary		Radical.
26 December 1920 – 1920	Juan M. Garro		Federal interventor.
1920–1921	Federico Álvarez de Toledo		Federal interventor.
1921–1922	Benito Nazar Anchorena		Federal interventor.
1922–1923	Octaviano Vera		Radical Antipersonalista.
1923–1924	Luis Roque Gondra		Federal interventor.
1924–1928	Miguel Mario Campero		Radical Personalista ( yrigoyenista)
1928 – 6 September 1930	José Sortheix		Radical Personalista (yrigoyenista).
6 September 1930 – 1931	Ramón Castillo		De facto.
1931	Tito Luis Arata		De facto.
1931–1932	Horacio Calderón		De facto.
1932	Filiberto de Oliveira Cézar		De facto.
1932–1934	Juan Luis Nougués		Partido Provincial "Defensa-Bandera Blanca".
1934	Ricardo Solá		Federal interventor.
1934–1935	Miguel Bonastre		Federal interventor.
1935–1939	Miguel Mario Campero		Radical Concurrencista (U.C.R. Tucumán)
1939 – 4 June 1943	Miguel Critto		Radical Concurrencista (U.C.R. Tucumán)
20 February 1943 – 8 June 1943	Alberto Arancibia Rodriguez		Interventor federal.
8 June 1943 – 1943	Juan Rogelio Alvelo		De facto.
1943–1944	Alberto Baldrich Nacionalista		De facto.
1944	Adolfo Silenzi de Stagni		De facto.
1944	Francisco Ramos Mejía (hijo)		De facto.
1944	Alejandro Tissone		De facto.
1944 – 25 May 1946	Enrique García		Peronist.
25 May 1946 – 4 June 1950	Carlos Domínguez		Peronist.
4 June 1950 – 4 June 1952	Fernando Pedro Riera		Peronist.
4 June 1952 – 4 March 1955	Luis Cruz		Peronist.
4 March 1955 – 21 September 1955	José Humberto Martiarena		Federal interventor.
21 September 1955 – 24 September 1955	Horacio Zenarruza		De facto.
24 September 1955 – 4 October 1955	Jorge Mario Moretti		De facto.
4 October 1955 – 29 April 1957	Antonio Vieyra Spangenberg		De facto.
29 April 1957 – 5 May 1957	Daniel Ignacio Parodi		De facto.
5 May 1957 – 24 April 1958	Nicolás Mario Juárez García		De facto.
24 April 1958 – 1 May 1958	Abel Garaycochea		De facto.
1 May 1958 – 29 March 1962	Celestino Gelsi		UCRI.
29 March 1962 – 9 April 1962	Julio Martín Sueldo		De facto.
9 April 1962 – 21 May 1962	Carlos Alfredo Imbaud		De facto.
21 May 1962 – 31 May 1962	José Emilio Vigil Monteverde		De facto.
31 May 1962 – 15 November 1962	Ricardo Arandía		De facto.
15 November 1962 – 12 October 1963	Alberto Gordillo Gómez		De facto.
12 October 1963 – 28 June 1966	Lázaro Barbieri		UCRP.
28 June 1966 – 1966	Delfor Elías Otero		De facto.
1966–1968	Fernando Aliaga García		De facto.
-	Roberto Avellaneda		De facto.
1968–1970	Jorge Daniel Nanclares		De facto.
1970	Jorge Rafael Videla		De facto.
1970–1971	Carlos Alfredo Imbaud		De facto.
1971 – 25 May 1973	Oscar Sarrulle		De facto.
25 May 1973 – 24 March 1976	Amado Nicomedes Juri		Justicialist.
24 March 1976 – 1978	Antonio Domingo Bussi		De facto.
1978–1980	Lino Montiel Forzano		De facto.
1980–1983	Antonio Luis Merlo		De facto.
1983	Carlos Salmoiraghi		De facto.
1983	Mario Fator		De facto.

== Return to democracy (since 1983) ==
Governor	Term in office	Party	Election	Vice Governor
Pedro Fernando Riera	10 December 1983 – 10 December 1987	PJ	1983	—N/a
José Domato	10 December 1987 – 18 January 1991	PJ	1987	—N/a
Julio César Aráoz (Federal Interventor)	18 January 1991 – 29 October 1991	PJ	—N/a	
Ramón "Palito" Ortega	29 October 1991 – 29 October 1995	PJ	1991	Julio César Díaz Lozano
Antonio Bussi	29 October 1995 – 29 October 1999	FR	1995	Roque Raúl Topa
Julio Miranda	29 October 1999 – 29 October 2003	PJ	1999	Sisto Terán Nougués
José Alperovich	29 October 2003 – 29 October 2015	PJ	2003	Fernando Juri
José Alperovich	29 October 2003 – 29 October 2015	PJ	2007	Juan Luis Manzur
José Alperovich	29 October 2003 – 29 October 2015	PJ	2011	Juan Luis Manzur
Juan Luis Manzur	29 October 2015 – Incumbent	PJ	2015	Osvaldo Jaldo
Juan Luis Manzur	29 October 2015 – Incumbent	PJ	2019	Osvaldo Jaldo
Osvaldo Jaldo (Interim)	20 September 2021 – 23 February 2023	PJ	2019	Michael Acevedo

== See also ==
- Legislature of Tucumán
