= Aráoz =

Araoz is a variation of the Spanish Basque name Araotz which means "cold valley" in ancient Basque. The valley and municipality of Araotz (Araoz) has existed for more than 800 years. Basque surname, with Other variations of Araotz are Araoz, Arauz, Arautz and Araos. and may also refer to:

- Alejandro Fernández de Araoz y de la Devesa (1894–1970), Spanish lawyer and banker
- Alvin J. Araoz (1987-), American Entrepreneur
- Antero Flores Aráoz (1942–), Peruvian lawyer and politician
- Arturo Tabera Araoz (1903–1975), Roman Catholic cardinal from Spain
- Bernabé Aráoz (1776–1824), Argentine politician
- Claudio Fernández-Aráoz, Argentine business theorist and author
- Daniel Aráoz (disambiguation), several people
- Diego Aráoz (1771–1840), Argentine soldier and politician
- Duberty Aráoz (1920–?), Bolivian footballer active in the 1950s
- German Araoz, Argentine professional rugby union player
- Gregorio Aráoz de Lamadrid (1795–1857), Argentine military leader
- Mercedes Aráoz (1961–), Peruvian politician
- Pedro Miguel Aráoz (1759–1832), Argentine statesman and priest
