= Gregorio Paz =

Argentine soldier

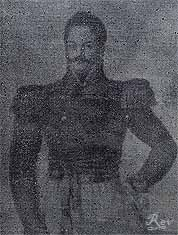
- Born: 1797; San Miguel de Tucumán
- Died: 7 September 1869 (aged 71–72); Buenos Aires
- Occupation: Soldier

Gregorio Paz (1797 - 7 September 1869) was an Argentine soldier who fought in the war of Independence, the war against the Peru–Bolivian Confederation and in the Argentine civil wars.

== Early years ==
Gregorio Paz was born in San Miguel de Tucumán in 1797. He was the son of Juan Bautista Paz, who served several times as minister of the province, and his brother was the vice president Marcos Paz. Gregorio Paz joined the Northern Army in 1814, where he participated in the Battle of Sipe-Sipe. After this, he joined the army of the Republic of Tucumán and participated in the civil wars of the early 1820s. In 1823 he was appointed commander of Amaichá Valley and Colalao Valley, on the western edge of the province.

He served under the leaders Javier López and Gregorio Aráoz de Lamadrid He participated in the Battle of El Tala at the front of the reserve, and was appointed to the rank of colonel in November 1826. He organised a squadron to fight in the War with Brazil (1825-1828), but it was used in the Argentine civil war, early on participating in the Battle of Rincon de Valladares. He fought in the army of the governor of Tucumán, Javier López, in the Battle of La Tablada against Facundo Quiroga, and in the subsequent campaign in Catamarca Province. There he organised the provincial army and commanded it in a campaign against La Rioja Province, which failed due to poor organisation of his forces. He returned to take part in actions in La Rioja, and was taken prisoner in 1831.

== Civil war ==
The federal governor Alejandro Heredia took his father, Juan Bautista Paz, as its general minister, and he obtained a pardon for his son. By 1835, after outstanding performance in the combat of Famaillá in January 1836, when former Governor Javier Lopez was finally defeated, he earned the post of commander of the forces of Tucumán. A few days later he occupied the north of the province of Catamarca in support of the ambitions of Heredia, who defeated the governor of that province, Felipe Figueroa, in the Battle of Chiflón. Due to that campaign, the province of Tucumán ceded more than half its area to the province of Catamarca.

In October of that year he married Ángela de Iramain, originally from Santiago del Estero and daughter of the late lieutenant governor of the province of the Republic of Tucumán, Domingo Iramain. Shortly after the campaign he led the invasion of Salta Province, in which Colonel Felipe Heredia held the government. He was appointed commander of arms of the province of Salta.

== War against the Peru-Bolivian Confederation ==
In April 1837 he was sent to the governor of Buenos Aires, Juan Manuel de Rosas, by the governments of Tucumán, Catamarca, Salta and Jujuy, to arrange support for the External Relations Minister of the Argentina Confederation for the war against the Peru-Bolivian Confederacy. While in Buenos Aires talking to Rosas, the legislature promoted him to colonel major, equivalent to general. During the war he was the commander of a division of the Argentine army, of which the nominal commander was Alejandro Heredia, and occupied the town of Humahuaca. Argentine troops commanded in the indecisive Battle of Santa Bárbara on September 13, 1837.

Moving to Orán, he led a campaign from there to Tarija, where he obtained from the military commander of that place, Ildefonso Cuellar, a ruling against General Andrés de Santa Cruz. He was supported in this campaign by commanders Virto Manuel and Manuel de la Barcena. In their victorious advance toward Tarija, he sent Virto to recover Iruya, but he was repulsed. On 18 June 1838 they encountered hit enemy outposts, but on the 21st began to withdraw, due to the failure in Iruya. His army was overtaken and defeated by General Braun in the Battle of Coyambuyo, or Battle of Montenegro, lost largely due to the defection of his infantry. He had to give up all the territory he had won and return to Oran. On August 22, Heredia ordered the withdrawal of his army, leaving continuation of the war to the forces of Chile, which eventually defeated Santa Cruz. On 12 November of that year, Governor Heredia, "Protector of the North", was killed by an officer of his army.

== In Buenos Aires ==
Heredia's death caused a stir in all the provinces of northern Argentina, and supporters of the deceased were removed from their governorships. The new governor of Tucuman, Bernabé Piedrabuena, expelled Paz from his province, and he settled in Buenos Aires in December of that year. He dedicated himself to denouncing the progressives of the Unity Party in the province, but for the moment Rosas took no action and joined his army. In 1840 he was appointed commander of the southern section of the city of Buenos Aires, to deal with the invasion of Juan Lavalle. He spent the following years in the obscurity of diverse administrative positions in the Buenos Aires army.

== San Gregorio ==
In late 1852, after the Battle of Caseros and the revolution of September 11, he joined the revolution led by Hilario Lagos, which confronted the separatist government of Buenos Aires led by Valentín Alsina. He was the chief of staff of the army, and directed operations against the reactionary forces led by Colonel Pedro Rosas y Belgrano. He was trapped at the mouth of the río Salado, where Paz was defeated in the Battle of San Gregorio on 22 January 1853. This led to the start of the siege of Buenos Aires, which after several months was about to fall into federal hands. But the betrayal of the federal fleet commander forced to siege to be raised. Paz became commander of Rosario, a key post. The city government demanded - in exchange for not attacking the province of Santa Fe - the removal of Paz, which occurred on the last day of 1854.

During the two years following, he inspected the military forces of the southern Confederacy and submitted an extensive report to President Justo José de Urquiza. On 27 December 1856 he retired with pay. He lost his pension after the Battle of Pavón, but regained it in 1868, when he was incorporated into the "List of Warriors of Independence". He died in Buenos Aires on 7 September 1869.
