= Abraham González (general) =

Argentine soldier

Governor of Tucumán Province
- In office 29 August 1821 – 10 January 1822
- Preceded by: Bernabé Aráoz
- Succeeded by: José Víctor Posse

Personal details
- Born: 1782 Concepción de la Sierra, Misiones Province
- Died: c. 1838 Buenos Aires
- Party: Federalist Party
- Occupation: Soldier
- Known for: Governor of Tucumán Province

Abraham González (1782 – c. 1838) was an Argentine soldier who participated in the Spanish American wars of independence and the Argentine Civil Wars, and was governor of Tucumán Province.

== Early years ==
Abraham González was born in Concepción de la Sierra, Misiones Province in 1782. In his youth he lived in the Banda Oriental and joined militias that took part in the uprising led by José Gervasio Artigas in 1811. He fought in the Battle of Las Piedras and the Battle of Cerrito in one of the divisions that took the city of Montevideo in 1814. González was sent to the Northern Army and participated in the campaign of José Rondeau in Upper Peru (Bolivia), fighting in the disastrous Battle of Sipe-Sipe. He spent the rest of that decade in the city of San Miguel de Tucumán, a member of the small garrison was left of the Northern Army, under the command of Colonel Domingo Arévalo.

== Republic of Tucumán ==
In mid November 1819, with two other officers, González arrested the governor, Feliciano de la Mota Botello, Colonel Arévalo and General Manuel Belgrano. He then called an open meeting where Bernabé Aráoz was made governor. Soon after, Aráoz separated the province from obedience to the Directory and proclaimed the "Republic of Tucumán". The new governor promoted González to the rank of lieutenant colonel. In March 1821 war broke out between Salta Province and Tucumán, and forces under Alejandro Heredia invaded the province, sent by Martín Miguel de Güemes. Aráoz took charge of the Tucumán army, which defeated the Salta forces at Rincón de Marlopa, just south of Tucuman, on 3 April. His chief of staff, Manuel Arias, directed a charge by González's infantry and cavalry that decided the victory. After this action he was promoted to general.

In late August, González was a leader of malcontents in the army allied with the caudillo Juan Felipe Ibarra of Santiago del Estero. González deposed Governor Aráoz on the excuse that he was not helping in the war of independence and had not sent a deputy to the Congress of Cordoba. González was appointed governor on 29 August 1821 and appointed Dr. José Mariano Serrano as his Minister. The first thing he did was to declare that the republic was extinct, which was unavoidable since Catamarca Province had also separated. His government limited itself to measures that maintained peace with its neighbors.

== Later years ==
His enemies, allies of Aráoz such as Javier Lopez, overthrew González on 10 January 1822, appointing in his stead Diego Aráoz, a relative of Bernabé Aráoz. González was sent as a prisoner to Córdoba, where he was released. He completely disappeared from the public eye and spent the rest of his life working in the field in Buenos Aires Province, under his brother, Colonel Bernardo González, a very close friend of Juan Manuel de Rosas. He died in Buenos Aires around 1838.
