= Feliciano de la Mota Botello =

Argentine politician

Governor of Tucumán Province
- In office 6 October 1817 – 11 November 1819
- Preceded by: Bernabé Aráoz
- Succeeded by: Bernabé Aráoz

Personal details
- Born: 1769 Santa Fe (Argentina)
- Died: c. 1830 San Fernando del Valle de Catamarca
- Occupation: Merchant, Soldier
- Known for: Governor of Tucumán Province

Feliciano de la Mota Botello (1769–1830) was an Argentine politician who became governor of Tucumán Province in the years after the May Revolution.

== Early years ==
Feliciano de la Mota Botello was born in 1769 in Santa Fe, in what was then the Viceroyalty of the Río de la Plata. He had settled in Catamarca Province by 1790. He became one of the leading merchants in the city, and was several times mayor of the city. He traveled regularly on business to Buenos Aires, where he became interested in the Patriotic Society, which put him in touch with Mariano Moreno and Manuel Belgrano, an important connection.

== Catamarca leader ==
After the May Revolution in 1810 these relationships led to his appointment of Commander of Arms and lieutenant governor of the "possession" of Catamarca, which was part of the Salta del Tucumán Province. He was given the military rank of lieutenant colonel.

He reached Catamarca in October 1810 and set out to instill the revolutionary spirit in his province. He also formed a corps of 150 Catamarca volunteers to join the First Expedition to Upper Peru. All while he was in government he helped form the provincial militias and aid the national armies.

Mota was replaced in January 1812 by Domingo Ortiz de Ocampo from La Rioja Province, brother of the former chief of the Army of the North. He remained in Catamarca as military chief, and in September 1814 was re-appointed lieutenant governor. The next month, Salta del Tucumán was divided into Salta Province and Tucumán Province, with Catamarca part of Tucumán. However, the town of Santa María was transferred from Catamarca to Salta. Mota protested to the Directory, and took control of Santa María. He took advantage of the fact that Salta was occupied in repelling royalist forces. He continued to send aid to the Army of the North, although his relations with the commander José Rondeau were strained.

== Governor of Tucumán ==
When Manuel Belgrano took over the army, he found Colonel Bernabé Aráoz, Governor of Tucumán, to be too powerful. Aráoz was a patriot, but with conservative political views, and refused to become subordinate to Belgrano. Belgrano accused Aráoz of not providing enough help from provincial funds, and in September 1817 Belgrano got the Director Juan Martín de Pueyrredón to appoint Mota Botello in his place as governor of Tucumán. Belgrano and Mota soon had to accept that Aráoz had not hidden anything. There simply was no money to help the Army of the North. Meanwhile, the government in Buenos Aires was spending all their revenue on fighting the federalist rebels and on supporting the Army of the Andes in its campaign in Chile. Belgrano was unable to attempt a fourth expedition to Upper Peru (Bolivia).In late 1818 the army moved to Córdoba to fight against the federalist in Santa Fe Province, which ended in a federalist victory in the Battle of Cepeda (1820).

A small part of the Army remained in Tucumán under Colonel Domingo Arévalo. After a two years of monotonous and poor governance, Mota was collaborating with Arevalo, who was in command of three corps of the Dragoons, led by the captains Felipe Heredia, (Note: Felipe Heredia was the brother of Alejandro Heredia, the future leader of Tucuman) Abraham González and Manuel Cainzo. The captains staged a coup on 10 November 1819 and arrested Mota, who was wounded in the arm, Arevalo and Belgrano. (Note: Belgrano had resigned the command of the Northern Army and was sick, convalescing in army barracks; he was to die seven months later.) The same day, the City Council elected Bernabé Aráoz as governor of Tucumán for a second term. He refused to obey the Directory, which would anyway disappear in less than three months.

== Later career ==
Mota was detained several weeks, until it became clear that he could not reclaim a position that been given him by a government that no longer existed. Released, he returned to Catamarca, which remained dependent on Tucumán. He was lieutenant governor, reporting to Aráoz, between August 1820 and March 1821. He was then replaced by Don Juan Jose de la Madrid, who had long experience in the Tucumán council, and was husband of Aráoz's sister Catalina. Shortly after he left office, forces from Salta led by Apolinario Figueroa imposed a new government on Catamarca that was independent of Tucumán, but dependent on the "protection" of Salta. This lasted a month. In late April, Catamarca returned to Tucumán.

However, in August 1821, when the power of Aráoz began to subside, a board of officers and chapter members declared the autonomy of Catamarca Province.

Three days later Aráoz was deposed and his successor, General Abraham González, did not have the strength to prevail over Catamarca. The first governor was a civilian, Nicolás Avellaneda y Tula, (Note: Avellaneda was the father of Marco Avellaneda, antirrosista leader in 1840, and Nicolás Avellaneda, who would later be president.) but the leaders of the movement were the colonels Mota, Eusebio Gregorio Ruzo and Marcos Antonio Figueroa. They later formed the federal party in the province. Mota appeared for some time like the lawgiver in his province during the federal governments of Ruzo and Figueroa.

He died in March 1830 in San Fernando de Catamarca.
