= Javier López (general) =

Argentine soldier

Governor of Tucumán Province
- In office 11 May 1821 – 2 June 1821
- Preceded by: Bernabé Aráoz
- Succeeded by: Bernabé Aráoz

Governor of Tucumán Province
- In office 15 July 1822 – 26 November 1825
- Preceded by: Diego Aráoz
- Succeeded by: Gregorio Aráoz de Lamadrid

Governor of Tucumán Province
- In office 20 February 1829 – 14 April 1829
- Preceded by: Manuel Lacoa
- Succeeded by: Javier Paz

Governor of Tucumán Province
- In office 9 December 1829 – 22 February 1831
- Preceded by: Javier Paz
- Succeeded by: José Frías

Personal details
- Born: 1794 Monteros
- Died: 24 January 1836 (aged 41–42) San Miguel de Tucumán
- Party: Unitarian Party
- Occupation: Soldier
- Known for: Governor of Tucumán Province

Francisco Javier López (1794 – 24 January 1836) was an Argentine soldier, a leader in the Unitarian Party and several times Governor of Tucumán Province.

== Early struggles ==
Francisco Javier López was born in Monteros, Tucumán Province in 1794. Although poor, his family claimed descent from the founders of the almost mythical city of Esteco. As a youth he devoted himself to horse racing, the favorite entertainment in San Miguel de Tucumán, at the "Campo de las Carreras" where the Battle of Tucumán would later be fought. The future caudillo Bernabé Aráoz employed him in his shop, taught him to write and sent him on business trips to Buenos Aires. He married Lucía Aráoz Alurralde, and they had four children, Benjamín, Javier, Serafina and Domitila.

In 1819, having recently assumed command of the Republic of Tucumán, Aráoz made López a cavalry colonel. When Martín Miguel de Güemes of Salta Province invaded Tucumán in 1821, he was defeated by the troops of Abraham González and Javier Lopez at Rincón de Marlopa. A few months later González overthrew Aráoz and assumed the governorship of Tucumán, imprisoning those loyal to the caudillo including López. López escaped, and on 8 January 1822 overthrew González. He became military chief, while Diego Aráoz was named governor. The two men quarreled, and on 15 July 1822 López assumed the governorship.

== Civil war in Tucumán ==
During the following months, the province entered a period of violent anarchy, in which the two Aráoz's and Javier López in turned seized the governorship. They all wanted to rule, and had different political agendas. Bernabé Aráoz was supported by the rural population, so his supporters became Federales. López's friends, with a more urban base, would become Unitarians. If many of the caudillos on the Federales side fought only to keep control of their fiefdoms, it was clear from the example of Javier López that many unitarian leaders had the same goal. In August 1823 López and Diego Aráoz overthrew Bernabé Aráoz, who fled to Salta Province. The two leaders sealed their alliance with the marriage of Diego Aráoz's daughter Lucia to López. After this, Diego Aráoz resigned himself to supporting his son-in-law, and ended his political career.

In February 1824, López was elected governor. In March of that year the governor of Salta, Juan Antonio Álvarez de Arenales, handed Bernabé Aráoz back to López's force, who executed him. López eliminated competition from Nicolás Laguna, the most important federal civilian leader of the province, and also a relative of Diego Araoz. López reorganized the legislature, dissolved the council, sent deputies to the General Congress of 1824 (one of them was Colonel Alejandro Heredia), and sent several young people to study in Buenos Aires, including Juan Bautista Alberdi and Marcos Paz. Although there were some attempts at revolt, the province remained largely at peace. When Congress was preparing to pass a Unitarian constitution, López came out for that party.

In late 1825 Colonel Gregorio Aráoz de Lamadrid came to the province to gather troops for the war against the Empire of Brazil. Suspicious of what would happen in his absence, and also wanting to avenge the death of his relative Bernabé Araoz, in late November Lamadrid took power in a daring surprise attack and the Legislature appointed him governor. López returned to face him, but was defeated by Lamadrid and had to flee to Metán in Salta.

== The League of the Interior ==
In early 1826, López moved to Buenos Aires, where he befriended the war minister, Carlos María de Alvear. When he took charge of the campaign against Brazil, Alvear took him as his aide. He was present at the Battle of Ituzaingó and commanded a cavalry regiment in the Battle of Camacuã. He returned to Buenos Aires with Alvear, and thence to Tucumán. Nicolás Laguna was governor there, but was soon replaced by José Manuel Silva. López led a revolution against him, and on 2 February 1829 López had himself elected governor.

López immediately declared his support for the revolution led by Juan Lavalle, who had overthrown the government of Manuel Dorrego and started a civil war that spread throughout the country. His province prepared for civil war and joined the Unitarian League of Interior, led by José María Paz from Córdoba. His first step was to invade Catamarca Province, where he deposed the federalist governor. Then he joined José María Paz's army in Córdoba, and fought under his command in the Battle of la Tablada de Tolomosa. Lamadrid had to fight in the same army, but refused to join the Tucumán division.

López invaded Catamarca again and returned the Unitarians to power, and from there attacked La Rioja Province, briefly occupying the capital when it was evacuated by the caudillo Facundo Quiroga. Just after returning to Tucumán, he had to intervene for the third time in Catamarca, which prevented him from fighting in the Battle of Oncativo. In May 1830 he invaded Santiago del Estero Province, overthrowing the leader Juan Felipe Ibarra. But in December of that year he was defeated by the Federales in Santiago del Estero, who returned to power.

In February 1831, he resigned the governorship and was replaced by José Frías, taking over command of the Tucumán forces. López repeatedly tried to recover Santiago del Estero, but in August finally retired to his own province. José María Paz was taken prisoner in May 1831, and the army command passed to Lamadrid. Hounded by the Federales from almost every direction, he retired to Tucumán. Rudecindo Alvarado, governor of Salta, refused to join forces with Lamadrid. With the troops he could muster, and with the right wing of his army under Javier Lopez, Lamadrid was defeated by Facundo Quiroga at the Battle of La Ciudadela on 4 November 1831. All the Unitarian leaders had to flee to Bolivia.

== Final campaign ==
López settled in Tupiza, where he went into business. In Tucumán, his nephew Dr. Angel López attempted several insurrections against Alejandro Heredia. On 22 June 1834 General José Jerónimo Helguera, Javier López, and Angel Lopez launched an attempted Unitarian revolution in Tucumán to overthrow the Federalist Heredia. The attempt failed, and López escaped to Bolivia. In June 1835, the López's again marched to Tucumán via Salta, but failed in their invasion. This invasion was supported by Governor of Salta, Pablo Latorre, and led to a civil war between Federales.

López's last attempt to return to power was in January 1836. Accompanied by his nephew and Colonel Segundo Roca, they descended from the Altiplano to Santa María, Catamarca, and from there invaded Tucumán. They were defeated by Heredia, who sentenced them to death, saying that "I have not found a safe spot on earth where they will not continue doing evil." Only Colonel Roca was saved through the intercession of Agustina Paz, the daughter of Heredia's minister, Juan Bautista Paz. He married Agustina and they were the parents of the future general and president Julio Argentino Roca.

Javier López was shot along with his nephew Angel López in Independence Square in Tucumán on 24 January 1836.
