= Diego Aráoz =

Argentine soldier

Diego Aráoz Valderrama

Governor of Tucumán Province
- In office January 1822 – .
- Preceded by: Abraham González (general)
- Succeeded by: Bernabé Aráoz

Governor of Tucumán Province
- In office August 1823 – .
- Preceded by: Bernabé Aráoz
- Succeeded by: Nicolás Laguna

Personal details
- Born: 1771
- Died: 1840 (aged 68–69)
- Occupation: Soldier
- Known for: Governor of Tucumán Province

Diego Aráoz Valderrama (1771–1840) was an Argentine soldier who was governor of Tucumán Province several times in the early nineteenth century during a time of political chaos and internecine struggle among the ruling elite of the province.

== Background ==
Diego Aráoz was born in 1771. His father was Francisco Javier de Aráoz Paz y Figueroa, and his mother was María Petrona de Ledesma Valderrama Diez Andino. On 11 April 1804 he married Micaela Alurralde Ávila. Their daughter Lucía Aráoz Alurralde was born the next year.

Diego was a distant relative of Bernabé Aráoz, being his father's second cousin. There was bitter enmity between Diego Aráoz and Bernabé Aráoz, which can probably be traced to family conflicts in the late eighteenth century. Bernabé Aráoz was elected governor of Tucumán on 12 November 1819, and the next year proclaimed the Republic of Tucumán, consisting of today's provinces of Tucumán, Santiago del Estero and Catamarca. The republic was attacked by Martín Miguel de Güemes, Governor of Salta, whom Bernabé Aráoz finally defeated on 3 April 1821. The republic dissolved as both Santiago del Estero and Catamarca obtained autonomy from Tucumán. On 28 November 1821, Abraham González, chief of the armed forces, deposed Bernabé Aráoz, who took refuge in the countryside.

== Power struggles ==
Within the residual Tucumán Province a three-way power struggle continued between Bernabé Aráoz, Diego Aráoz and Javier López. In January 1822, Javier López and Diego Aráoz defeated and deposed Abraham González. López and Diego Aráoz could not agree on power sharing, and seemed ready to clash. The council appointed Diego Aráoz as governor to resolve the matter. Bernabé Aráoz then returned to Tucumán, and López gave him his support. Eventually Diego Aráoz resigned and Bernabé took his place.

Soon after, Diego Aráoz launched new hostilities. The council tried to calm the situation by appointing a compromise candidate as governor, Clemente Zavaleta, but the upheavals continued. López allied himself with Juan Felipe Ibarra of Santiago del Estero and attacked Tucumán, but was defeated. Zavaleta resigned the governorship. Pedro Valarde took office, then there was a triumvirate, than Diego Aráoz, then Velarde, and then once more Diego Aráoz. In July 1822 Bernabé Aráoz defeated Diego Aráoz and was elected governor by the council, but Diego returned in August and defeated Bernabé. For a few days Dr. Nicolás Laguna assumed the government.

In October, Bernabé Aráoz defeated the combined forces of Diego Aráoz and Javier López, winning the governorship for the next eleven months. Early in August 1823, Diego Aráoz attacked and took the city. Bernabé Aráoz gathered forces in the country, and fought Javier López at the Rincón de Marlopa on 25 August 1823. He was defeated and fled to Salta. The two leaders sealed their alliance with the marriage of Diego Aráoz's daughter Lucia to Javier López. After this, Diego Aráoz resigned himself to supporting his son-in-law, and ended his political career. Aráoz was replaced as governor by Dr. Laguna.

== Later years ==
In February 1824 Javier López was appointed governor. In 1825 López was deposed by the Unitarian Gregorio Aráoz de Lamadrid.

Diego Aráoz died in 1840.
