= Abraham González =

Abraham González may refer to:

- Abraham González (general), (1782–c. 1838), Argentine soldier who was governor of Tucumán Province, Argentina
- Abraham González (governor) (1864–1913), governor of the Mexican state of Chihuahua
- Abraham González Uyeda (born 1966), Mexican politician
- Abraham Arrieta González, Mexican luchador, or professional wrestler
- Abraham González (footballer) (born 1985), Spanish footballer
- Abraham González International Airport, an airport in Ciudad Juárez, Chihuahua, Mexico
