= Fort Abipones =

Fort Abipones (Spanish: Fuerte de Abipones) was a military outpost in the Quebrachos Department near the southern border of Santiago del Estero Province of the United Provinces of the Río de la Plata, today's Argentina. Now in ruins, it remains a tourist attraction. It is named for the indigenous Abipón people.

The fort was established to protect the frontier of Río Seco, supporting the forts of San Juan, Candelaria (built by Francisco Bedoya), Saladillo and Puesto de Sánchez. At that time, the settlers were under threat from the Chaco Indians. During the early years of independence, Juan Felipe Ibarra commanded the militia at the fort, and also owned land in the vicinity. He led his men on the first military expedition to Upper Peru, and in March 1820 led these men in support of the revolution in Santiago del Estero when it declared autonomy from the Republic of Tucumán created by Bernabé Aráoz.
