= Federico Helguera =

Juan Antonio Federico Helguera (13 June 1823 – 17 August 1892) was an Argentine businessman and politician who twice served as governor of Tucumán Province.

He was the son of Crisanta Garmendia and Lieutenant Colonel Gerónimo Helguera, a veteran of the war of independence, and was baptized in Buenos Aires on 18 June 1823. In 1836 his family was forced to relocate to Copiapó, Chile, after his father participated in a revolt against Alejandro Heredia. He was educated in Santiago under the tutelage of his uncle, General Francisco Antonio Pinto, the former president of Chile. In 1838, after the death of his father, he was forced to interrupt his studies and devote himself to business and mining. In 1851 he spent a year in Tucumán, where his mother was living. He lived in Chile until 1859, when he moved permanently to Tucumán Province.

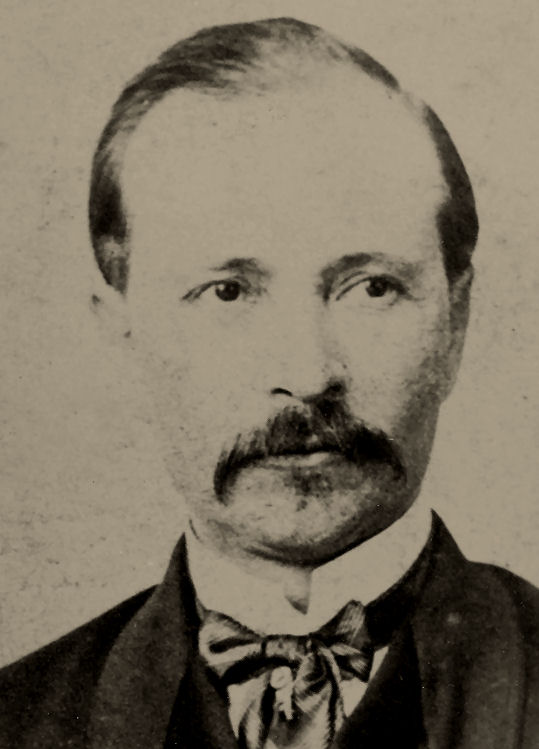
Federico Helguera

In 1864 he married Elvira Molina Cossio. The union produced six children, of which three survived: Federico, Gerónimo, and María Elvira Josefa Helguera Molina. He fathered another son out of wedlock, Aníbal Helguera Sánchez.

A member of the National Autonomist Party, Helguera was a provincial deputy during the periods 1868–69, 1870–71, 1875–76, 1879–80, and 1882–83; a provincial senator in 1886; a member of the Deliberative Council of the Government of the Federal Intervention in 1887; and governor of Tucumán Province in 1871–73 and 1877–78. During his time in office he promoted public education and social services. He made significant personal donations to the school that would later bear his name, and to improve the streets of San Miguel de Tucumán.

His personal connections enabled him to serve as a mediator in commercial interactions between northern Argentina and Chile. Among other things, he was a pioneer in the export of tobacco, an industry which spurred the development of the city of Concepción and transformed it into an agricultural center. In the course of his career, Helguera crossed the Andes more than thirty times. His business interests were diverse and included foreign imports, cattle ranching, and real estate investments.

He died on 17 August 1892 in San Miguel de Tucumán.
