= Juan Bautista Paz =

Argentine jurist and lawyer

- Born: 1772; San Miguel de Tucumán, Viceroyalty of Peru
- Died: 1844 (aged 71–72); San Miguel de Tucumán
- Occupation: Lawyer

Juan Bautista Paz (1772–1844) was an Argentine jurist and lawyer, a member of the National Congress of 1819 and the General Conference of 1824, and several times cabinet minister and deputy governor of Tucumán Province during the first half of the nineteenth century.

== Early years ==
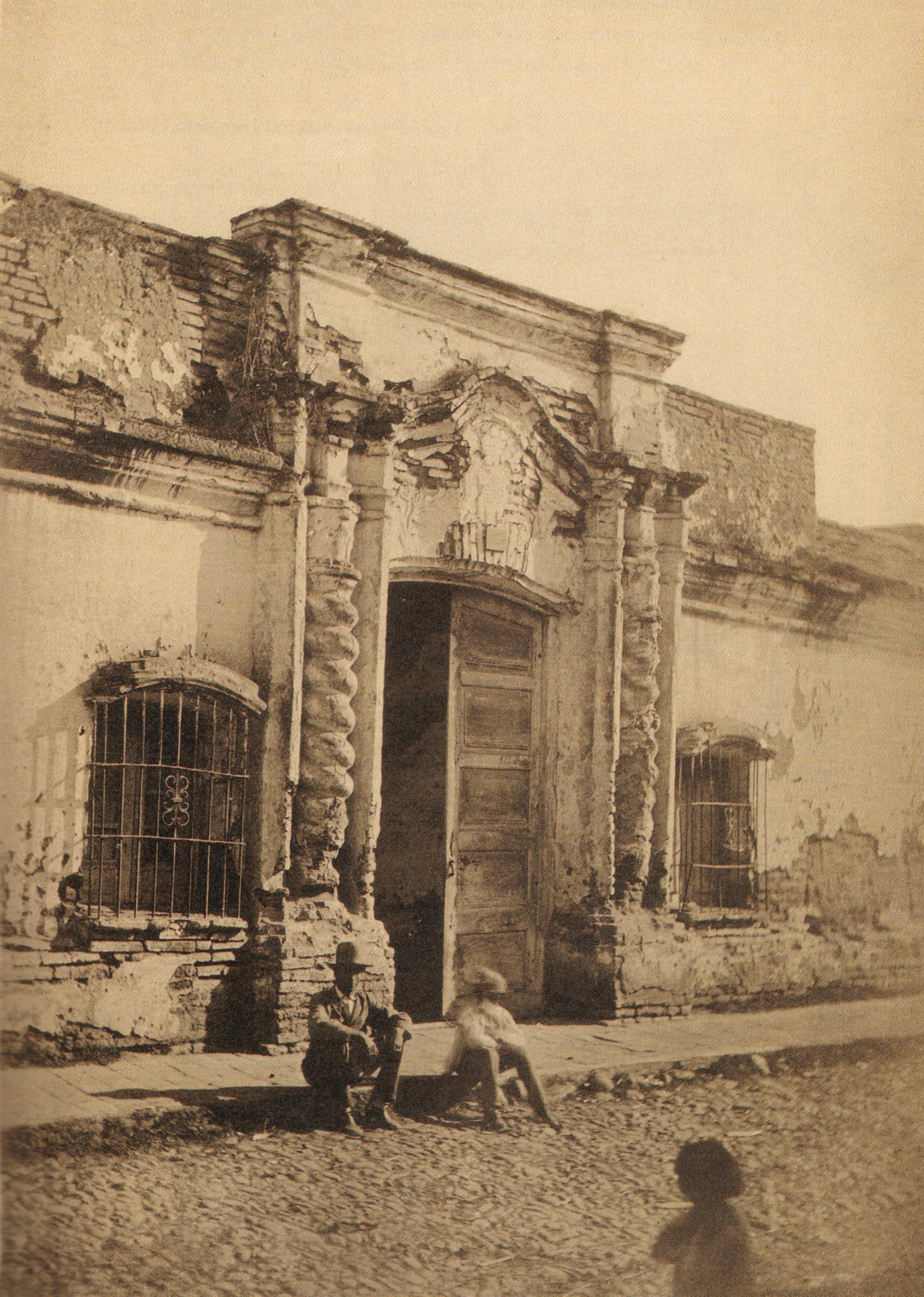
The old Casa de Tucumán, where the independence of the United Provinces of the Río de la Plata (Now Argentina) was proclaimed in 1816. Photograph from 1868

Juan Bautista Paz was born in San Miguel de Tucumán in 1772, the son of a merchant from Santiago del Estero. He studied law at the University of Charcas and gained a doctorate in jurisprudence shortly before 1800, when he enrolled in the Audiencia of Buenos Aires. He soon returned to Tucumán, where he held several positions in the local council. When the council heard about the May Revolution in Buenos Aires on June 26, 1810, Juan Bautista Paz cast the deciding vote for the town to back the patriots' side. The following year, Paz was a member of the Local Government Board. He gave up that post in early 1812. He helped General Manuel Belgrano to organize a key victory in the Battle of Tucumán, and the following year he was mayor of the town.

== Tucumán political leader ==
Juan Bautista Paz was lieutenant governor in Tucumán during the first governorship of Bernabé Araoz, until Tucumán was separated from Salta Province in 1816. The electors refused to recognize the election of Pedro Miguel Aráoz and Juan Bautista Paz as deputies in 1816, causing Paz to resign. He continued to occupy positions of importance, especially under Aráoz. Aráoz's successor, Feliciano de la Mota Botello, appointed him fiscal agent, a position equivalent to that of finance minister of the province. In 1819 he was appointed Member of the National Congress, a position he held until its dissolution after the Battle of Cepeda. In that position he voted in favor of the 1819 Constitution of Argentina, but had no part in its wording.

Paz returned to Tucumán in February 1820, and Governor Araoz appointed him a Minister in the government. He helped draft the constitution of the Republic of Tucumán. The people of Santiago del Estero were inclined to autonomy. Aráoz sent Juan Bautista Paz to arrange the election of deputies, with a military force led by Juan Francisco Echauri. One of Echauri's first actions was to change the members of the municipality to one in favor of Tucumán. The people of Santiago del Estero rebelled. Eventually peace was settled between Tucumán and Santiago with a treaty of 5 June 1821. In February 1821 he signed the Vinará treaty on behalf of Aráoz, the first between Tucumán and Santiago del Estero, which formally recognized the separation of Santiago del Estero from the province of Tucuman.

During the following years, in which the province of Tucumán was shaken by wars between supporters of Bernabé Araoz and Javier López, he held important political positions with both sides. After the fall of both, he became a minister of General Gregorio Aráoz de Lamadrid, the new head of Tucumán. In November 1826 Juan Bautista Paz joined the new National Congress, which voted for the unitary constitution. He supported the government of Bernardino Rivadavia - especially his policy against provincial autonomy - and returned to his home province shortly after the resignation of Rivadavia.

== Civil war and after ==
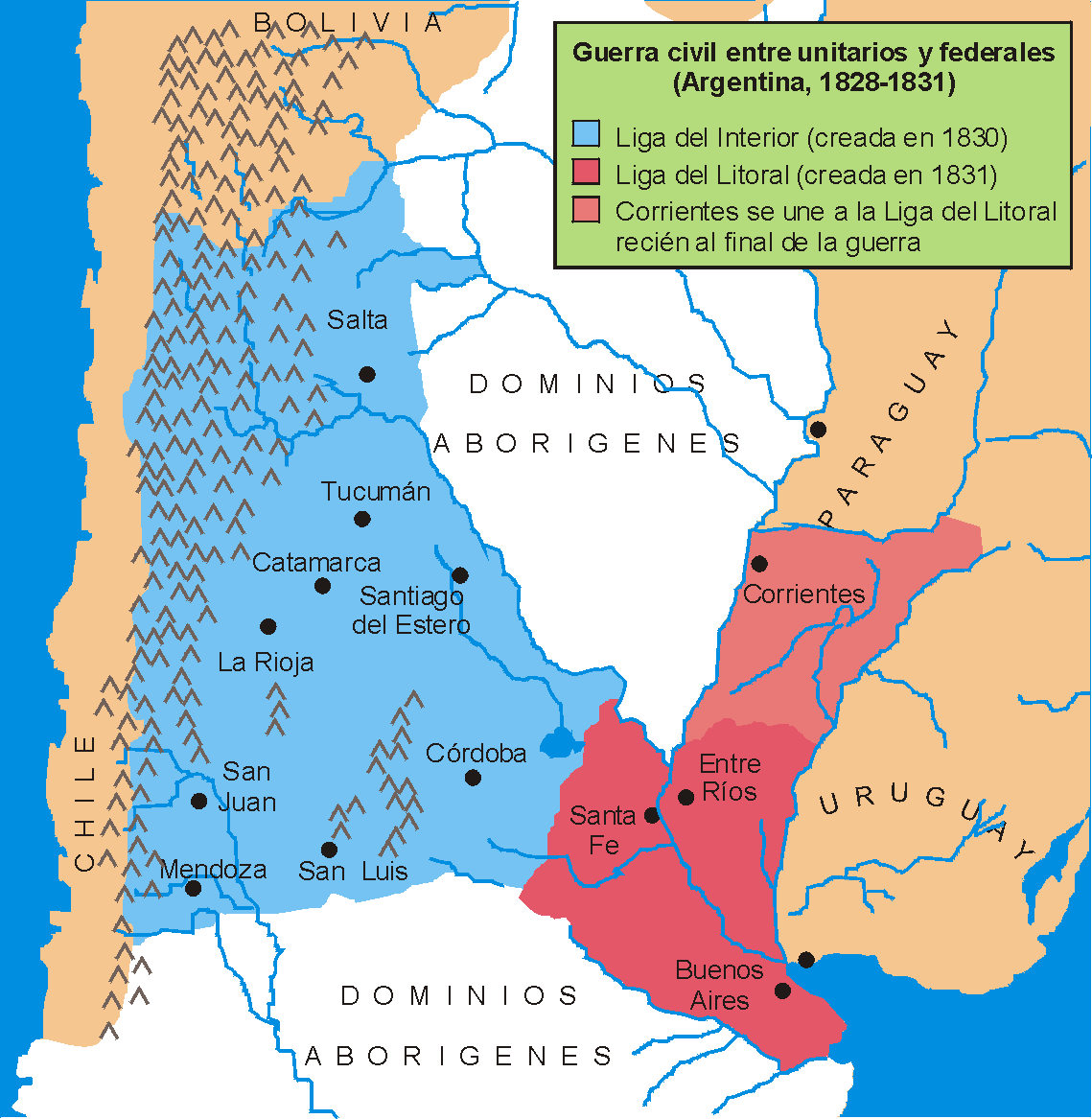
Unitarian (blue) and Federal (red) leagues

Juan Bautista Paz was a minister in the government of Governor Javier Lopez at the start of the civil war that started in December 1828, and for various periods was deputy governor of Tucumán. He governed the province during the long absence of Lopez in Córdoba Province, in support of the Unitarian League and General José María Paz.

When the Unitarian League was defeated in 1831, the new governor and Federal warlord, Alejandro Heredia, appointed Paz a minister in the government. Several times he was deputy governor, especially during the military campaigns of Heredia. In one of them, in 1836, Javier Lopez was captured, along with several of the warlords under his command, and all of them were executed. Only Colonel Segundo Roca was saved, by special request of Paz to the governor. The reason for this request was that Roca was courting his daughter, Agustina Paz, with whom he married a few months later.

Paz also was delegate of the governor for almost a year, while the governor directed the war against Bolivia. He handed back to Heredia shortly before he was killed. After the crime that killed Heredia, the government appointed Colonel Bernabé Piedrabuena, an officer of weak character who was quickly surrounded by young staff, such as Marco Avellaneda, who did not want an old functionary such as Paz. He retired to his farm near the capital, where he focused on planting sugar cane and manufacturing liquor, alcohol and sugar. He died in San Miguel de Tucuman in 1844.

Juan Bautista Paz was the father of General Gregorio Paz and Vice President Marcos Paz. By his daughter Agustina and Colonel Roca, he was grandfather of General Julio Argentino Roca, twice president of Argentina.
