= Silvano Bores =

Argentine politician

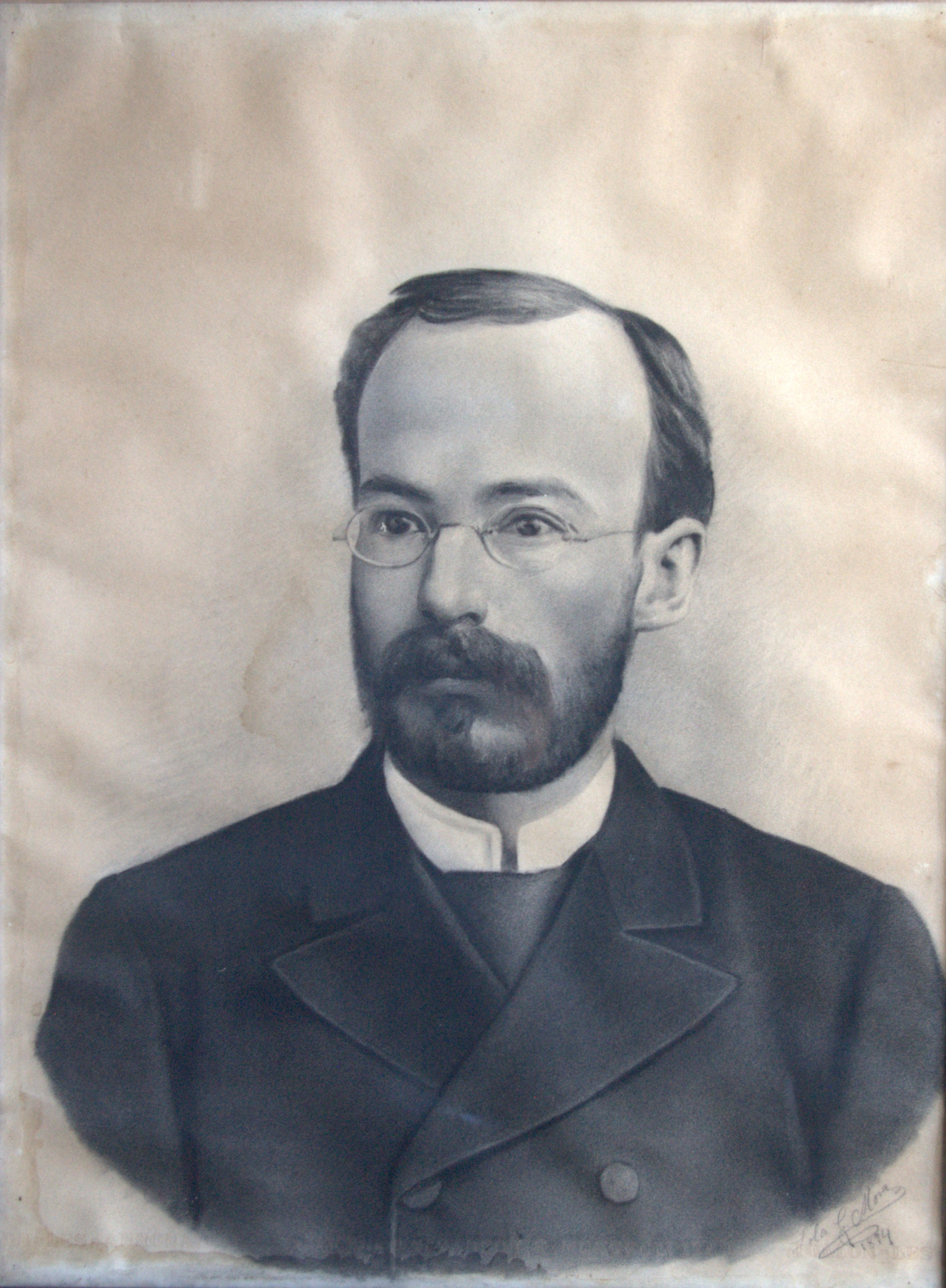
Portrait of Silvano Bores

Silvano Bores (17 February 1855, Tucumán–19 March 1903, Córdoba) was an Argentine politician who was elected four times to the Chamber of Deputies, in 1880, 1888, 1898 and 1902, and was the Governor of Tucumán Province from 17 June 1890 to 16 November 1890. He was part of the Generation of '80 and was a poet.
