= Lino Montiel Forzano =

Argentine army general and politician (1923/1924 – 2023)

Governor of Tucumán Province
- In office 6 December 1977 – 29 March 1981
- Preceded by: Antonio Domingo Bussi
- Succeeded by: Antonio Luis Merlo

Personal details
- Born: Lino Domingo Montiel Forzano; 1923/1924
- Died: 9 October 2023 (aged 99)
- Occupation: Army general

Lino Domingo Montiel Forzano (1923/1924 – 9 October 2023) was an Argentine army general and politician. He served as Governor of Tucumán Province from 1977 to 1981.

Montiel died in October 2023, at the age of 99.
