= Santiago Gallo =

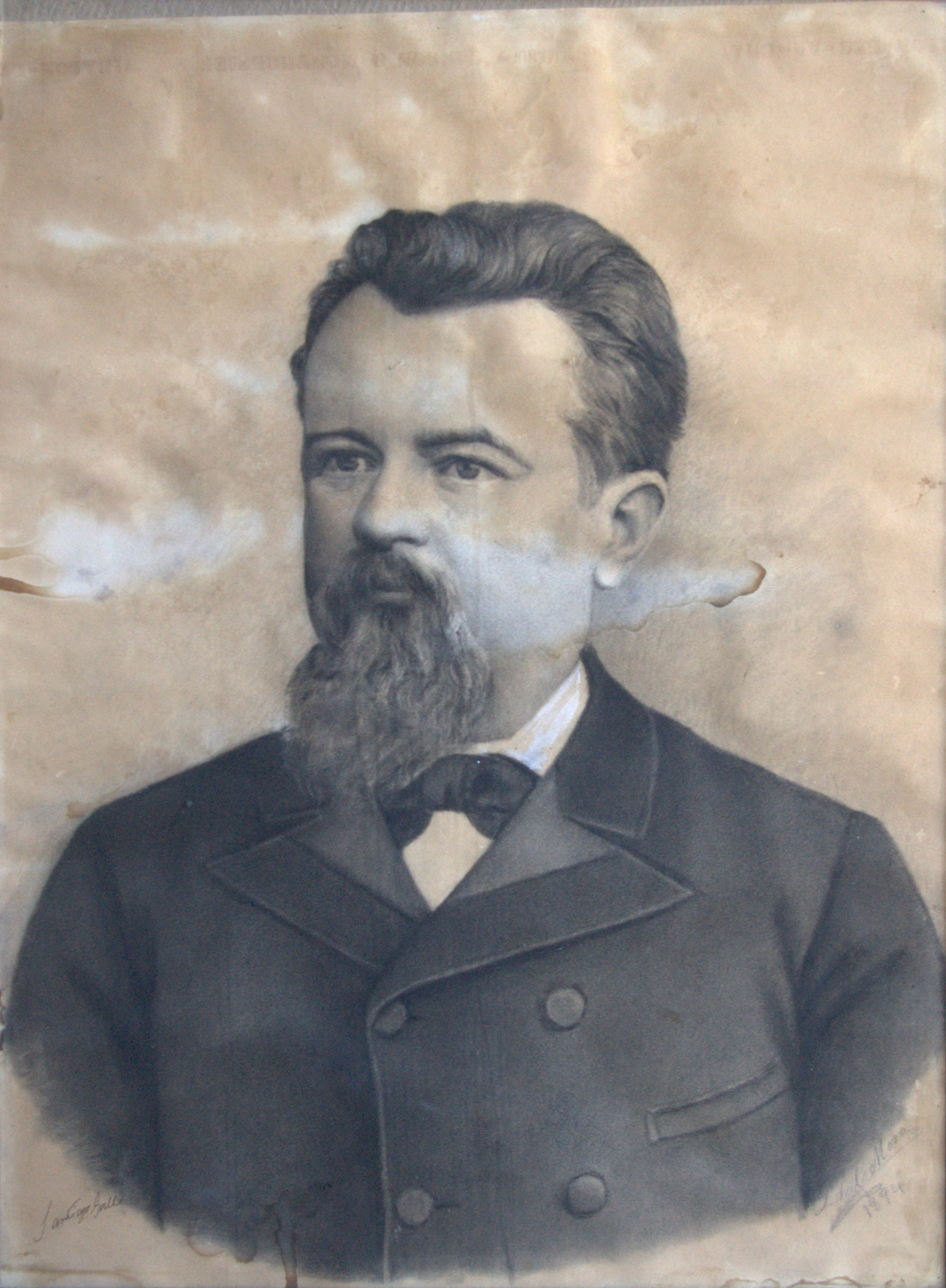

Santiago Gallo (1851–1909) was an Argentine sugar industrialist and Tucumán politician. He was born in San Miguel de Tucumán in 1851 and died in 1909.

== Career ==
Santiago Gallo and his brother Delfin Gallo grew up in San Miguel de Tucumán and belonged to the Tucumán oligarchy. Unlike his brother, his activities were concentrated in the sugar industry. He was in charge of two mills in Tucumán, Lujan and El Colmenar, and one in Santiago del Estero, the Contreras mill.

== Political controversy ==
Santiago Gallo became Governor of Tucumán on October 12, 1884, as a successor of Benjamin Paz. As he was an opponent of Miguel Juárez Celman he was prevented from taking office. His enemies turned to the recent Tucumán Constitution, whose Article 13 said that the current governor would fulfill his term to the end, but the successor should conform to the new Constitution. As it concerned Benjamin Paz, who was a few days from demitting office when the constitution was passed, he was entitled to three years in office. As it related to Galló he would only serve two years. The question was settled by the Permanent Electoral College and ruled that the governor should remain for three years.

However, the opposition asked for the Federal Congress’ intervention. President Julio Argentino Roca complied with the Tucumán opponents, but warned Delfín Galló that he could not guarantee that the same thing would happen after his presidency ended. In June 1886, Juárez Celman was sworn in as president.

== Resignation ==
In accordance with the agreement with Roca, on September 3 Galló resigned the governorship, and was replaced by someone else close to "Juarism", such as the industrialist Juan Posse.
