= Daniel Aráoz =

Daniel Aráoz may refer to:

- Daniel Aráoz (actor) (born 1962), Argentine actor
- Daniel Aráoz (footballer) (born 1979), Argentine footballer
- Daniel Aráoz (politician), Argentine politician, governor of Jujuy Province (1865–1867)
