= Benjamín Aráoz =

Benjamín Aráoz (Tucumán, 29 January 1856 – Tucumán, 28 November 1895) was an Argentine physician and politician, governor of Tucumán Province.

== Biography ==
Francisco Eleodoro del Carmen Aráoz was the youngest son (hence the name "Benjamín") of Jesús María Aráoz from Tucumán and Epifania Ormaechea Saravia from Salta, an important family in Tucumán society but of limited means.

At the age of eleven he was awarded a scholarship by Governor David Zavalía to continue his studies at the National School of Buenos Aires, where he later graduated from the Medicine College (University of Buenos Aires) at the age of 21. His thesis on the medical use of ozone was ruined when he was about to finish it when research carried out in Europe in the same direction became known.

Under the pseudonym of Argos, he wrote for a living in the newspaper La República until 1878, when he joined the Argentine Navy's Health Corps. On 16 July of that year he was assigned as a doctor to monitor Los Andes, with which he took part in the Py Expedition to Patagonia Argentina. Once the mission was over, he explored the area of the Black River towards its headwaters, whose experience he wrote about in his essay El Lago Viedma de la Patagonia.

In August 1880 he was promoted to Chief Surgeon of the Navy with the rank of Captain. He continued serving the armed forces in Pringles, Viedma and Carmen de Patagones, until 1884, when he left with his brother Guillermo Aráoz to explore the Bermejo River.

When a cholera epidemic broke out at the end of 1886 in the provinces of Jujuy and Salta, he was sent by the national government to collaborate in the fight against the scourge. He arrived in Tucumán in the first days of January 1887 and carried out his task as director of the Public Health Commission until the end of the emergency in June. The result of this experience was his essay El Cólera en las Provincias del Norte 1886-1887 (Cholera in the Northern Provinces 1886-1887) (1887). Back in Buenos Aires he continued to work as a doctor in the Navy and in private practice. He wrote a new essay, La Ración del Marinero en la Escuadra Argentina (1890), which had wide repercussions in his country and prompted the Minister of War and Navy General Nicolás Levalle to form a commission to implement his recommendations.

In 1891, Governor Próspero García appointed him Minister of Finance, a position he held until 1893. After the revolution of that year, he was a candidate for governor for the El Provincial party and, despite the political divisions of the time, he was unanimously elected by the Electoral College, being sworn in at the Cabildo on 20 February 1894.

On the occasion of the centenary of the birth of the Tucuman general Gregorio Aráoz de Lamadrid, the governor decided to publish his Memoirs and bring his remains to the province. On the 28th of November 1895, after the parades, speeches and the religious celebration, and when he was about to begin his speech before the lunch in the town hall, he collapsed dead to the general consternation.

Among the results of his brief administration was the provision of running water to San Miguel de Tucumán, a work that would be completed after his death. He also created the General Inspectorate of Militias, and in his report to the legislature in October 1895, he reported the construction of 17 bridges, the reconstruction of sections of the Cabildo and the Penitentiary Prison, and repairs made to numerous churches in the interior of the province.
