= Claudio Fernández-Aráoz =

Argentinian businessman

- Education: Pontifical Catholic University of Argentina, Stanford University
- Occupations: Management consultant, Writer
- Writing career
- Notable works: It's Not the How or the What but the Who, Great People Decisions

Claudio Fernández-Aráoz is an Argentinian author, international speaker and global expert on talent and leadership, ranked by BusinessWeek as one of the most influential executive search consultants in the world. He is currently a senior adviser of Egon Zehnder. Before joining Egon Zehnder in 1986, he worked at McKinsey & Company in Europe. He is a frequent lecturer at the Harvard Business School. In 2008, he also won the Konex Award as one of the most important executives of that decade in Argentina.

== Background ==
Fernández-Aráoz earned a Master of Science in Industrial Engineering from the Pontifical Catholic University of Argentina, graduating with a gold medal, and an MBA from Stanford University, where he graduated with honors as an Arjay Miller Scholar.

=== Work ===
He is the author of It's Not the How or the What but the Who (Harvard Business Press, 2014), Great People Decisions (Wiley, 2007) which was acclaimed by Jim Collins, Daniel Goleman and Jack Welch, and has published several bestselling articles on the topic of People Decisions, including Hiring Without Firing, The Definitive Guide to Recruiting in Good Times and Bad, How to Hang On to Your High Potentials, and the June 2014 cover article 21st Century Talent Spotting of the Harvard Business Review. He has also written for MIT Sloan Management Review.
