= Concepción de la Sierra =

- Municipality and village
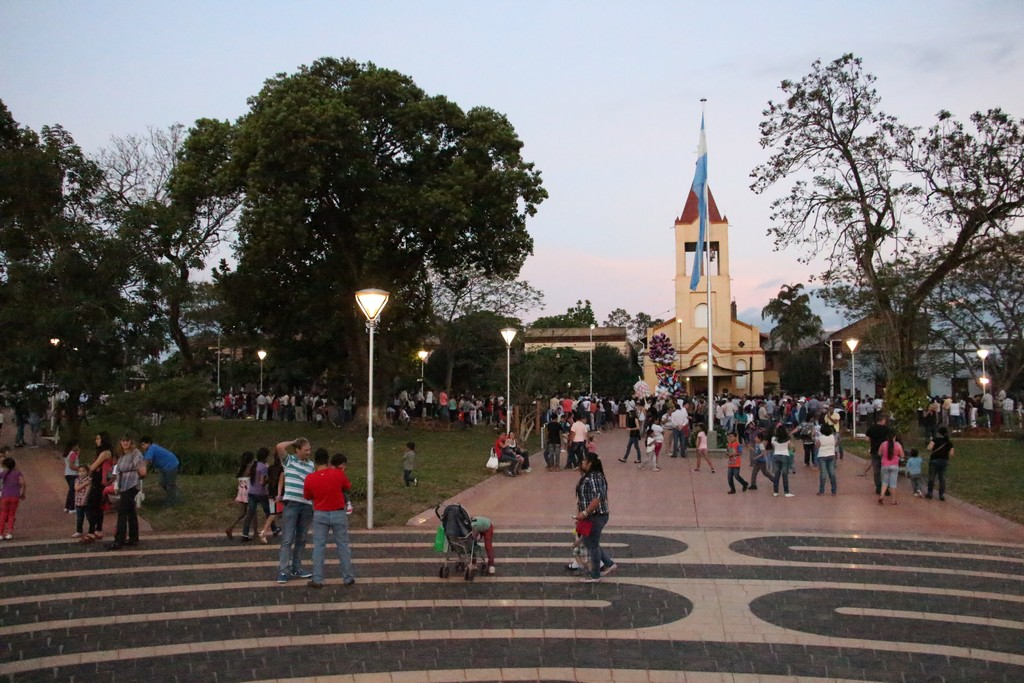

- Location within Misiones Province Location within Argentina
- Country: Argentina
- Province: Misiones Province

Government
  - Intendant: Hugo Humeniuk
- Time zone: UTC−3 (ART)

Concepción de la Sierra is a village and municipality in Misiones Province in north-eastern Argentina. The town sits on the original location of the Jesuit Reduction, founded in 1619. The Jesuit heritage is still visible. The Jesuits were expelled from the Spanish Empire in 1767.
