= Marcos Paz =

Vice President of Argentina

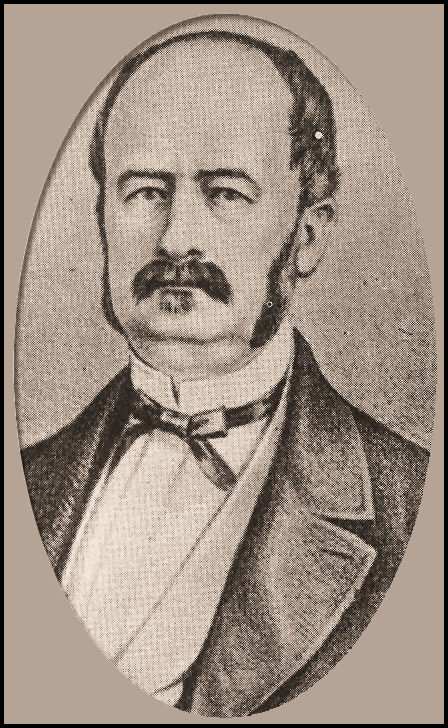

3rd Vice President of Argentina
- In office October 12, 1862 – January 2, 1868
- President: Bartolomé Mitre
- Preceded by: Juan Esteban Pedernera
- Succeeded by: Adolfo Alsina

Acting President of Argentina
- In office June 12, 1865 – January 2, 1868

Personal details
- Born: 1813 San Miguel de Tucumán
- Died: January 2, 1868 (aged 54–55) Buenos Aires
- Party: Liberal Party
- Spouse: Micaela Cascallares
- Relations: Agustina Paz de Roca(Sister); Alejo Julio Argentino Roca(Nephew)
- Education: University of Buenos Aires

Marcos Paz (1813 – January 2, 1868) was Governor of Córdoba and Tucumán Provinces, an Argentine Senator, and Vice President of Argentina from October 12, 1862, until his death in 1868.

== Biography ==
Marcos Paz was born to a prominent Tucuman family in 1813. His father was Juan Bautista Paz, a lawyer and legislator who served as deputy governor of the province several times, and his brother was General Gregorio Paz. He earned a law degree in 1834. He married the former Micaela Cascallares, daughter of a wealthy landowner, and settled with her in Buenos Aires.

After the fall of Juan Manuel de Rosas in 1852 he joined Justo José de Urquiza in his fight against Bartolomé Mitre's forces in Buenos Aires, and joined Col. Hilario Lagos as an adjutant; the siege was ultimately unsuccessful.

Elected Governor of Tucumán in 1858, Paz took part in the San José de Flores Pact of 1859, which helped secure national unity, and was elected to the 1860 convention that produced the first amendments to the Constitution of Argentina. He then assisted general Wesceslao Paunero, who was sent as an envoy by Mitre to other provincial leaders, and served briefly in his stead as Governor of Córdoba, from December 1861 to March 1862.

An erstwhile foe, Buenos Aires leader Bartolomé Mitre, befriended Paz during earlier negotiations, and nominated him as running mate for the 1862 elections. Mitre had obtained significant concessions for Buenos Aires following his victory at the Battle of Pavón in 1861, and the choice of Paz, who as a supporter of the Argentine Confederation would have otherwise be an opponent, was part of Mitre's bid to placate separatist sentiment outside Buenos Aires Province. The duo won unanimously in the electoral college, and Paz became Vice-President of Argentina.

When Mitre was away commanding the allied forces during the Paraguayan War, Paz fulfilled the role of acting president. He died in office on January 2, 1868, in Buenos Aires, as a victim of a Cholera epidemic, and Mitre had to return to Argentina to resume his position as president.

== Legacy ==
The Marcos Paz Partido, administrative division of Buenos Aires Province and its capital, the town of Marcos Paz are named after him.

Political offices
Preceded by Felix de la Peña	Governor of Córdoba; 1861 - 1862	Succeeded by Wenceslao Paunero
Preceded by Juan Esteban Pedernera	Vice President of Argentina; 1862-1868	Succeeded by Adolfo Alsina
