= Juan Felipe Ibarra =

Argentine soldier and politician

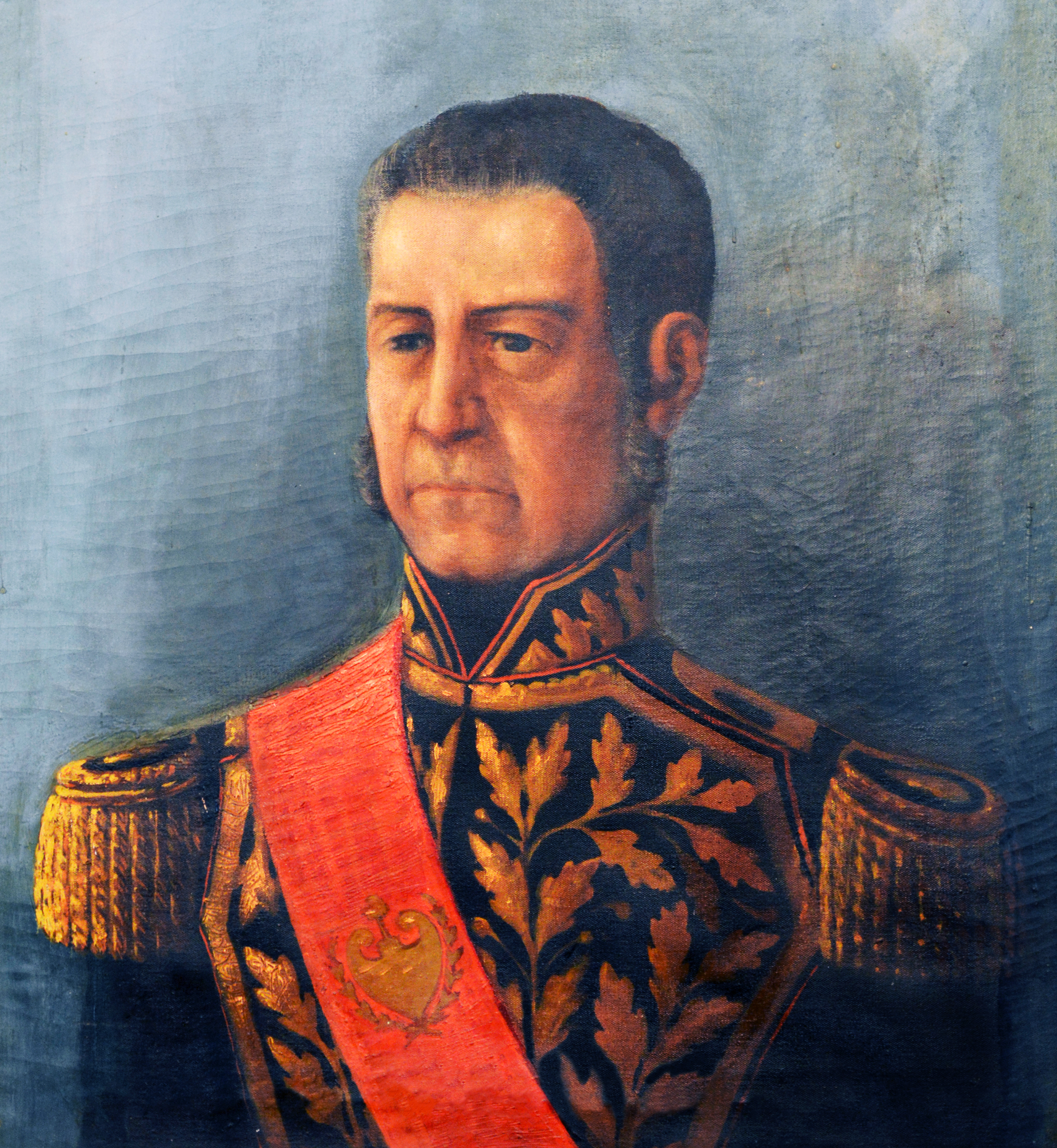

Governor of Santiago del Estero
- In office 31 March 1820 – 27 May 1830
- Preceded by: none
- Succeeded by: Manuel Alcorta

Governor of Santiago del Estero
- In office 16 February 1832 – 15 July 1851
- Preceded by: Santiago de Palacio
- Succeeded by: Mauro Carranza

Personal details
- Born: 1 May 1787 Monteros
- Died: 15 July 1851 (aged 64) Villa Matara, Santiago del Estero Province
- Occupation: Soldier

Juan Felipe Ibarra (1 May 1787 - 15 July 1851) was an Argentine soldier and politician. He was one of the caudillos who dominated the Argentine interior during the formation of the national state, and ruled the province of his birth for decades.

== Youth ==
Juan Felipe Ibarra was born on 1 May 1787 at Villa Matara (not to be confused with the modern Matará), former village of subject Indians and defensive post against the Chaco Indians. He was from a Santiago family of ranchers and soldiers. He studied for his bachelor of arts degree in the College of Monserrat at the city of Córdoba.

In late 1810, after the May Revolution, Ibarra joined the army that made the first expedition to Upper Peru (Bolivia). He fought in the Battle of Huaqui in the regiment led by Juan José Viamonte, and then the Battle of Las Piedras, where he was promoted to Captain, the Battle of Tucumán, after which he was promoted to Sergeant Major, and the Battle of Salta. He accompanied the third campaign to Upper Peru, fighting in the disastrous Battle of Sipe-Sipe. In late 1816, Brigadier Manuel Belgrano appointed him Lieutenant Colonel, commander of Fort Abipones in the southeast of his home province, a centre of defense against Chaco Indian attack. There he acquired prestige among soldiers, gauchos and farmers of his province. He was not involved in either of the two attempts to gain autonomy led by Lieutenant Colonel Juan Francisco Borges.

He rejoined the Army of the North shortly before the Arequito mutiny, in which he was not involved, but he supported the movement's leader, Colonel Major Juan Bautista Bustos in their retreat to Córdoba Province. From there he returned to Fort Abipones, supported by reinforcements sent by the caudillo and governor of Santa Fe Province, Lieutenant Colonel Estanislao López.

At that time, Tucumán Province (which then included Catamarca and Santiago del Estero) had pronounced in favor of federalism, under the command of the governor, Colonel Bernabé Araoz, who confirmed Ibarra as commander of Fort Abipones with the rank of Colonel. But since Aráoz assigned Santiago to a secondary role, supporters of provincial autonomy called for Ibarra's aid, and he occupied the capital. For lack of a better choice, the rebellious legislature named him Governor on 21 March 1820 and promoted him to Colonel Major, a rank equivalent to General. The experienced politicians of the city thought they would be able to control him, but he took charge.

== Governor of Santiago del Estero ==
Location of Santiago del Estero Province in Argentina

Aráoz threatened to regain the rebel province by force, and after the failure of an attempted revolution in Tucumán, in early 1821, invaded Santiago. Ibarra called for assistance from the governor of Salta Province, Colonel Major Martín Miguel de Güemes. He helped Ibarra to invade Tucumán. Although they were defeated, their action persuaded Aráoz to recognize the autonomy of Santiago del Estero with a treaty in Vinará, in June 1821.

He formed a division under the command of Colonel José María Paz, intended to form part of the expedition to Upper Peru had Güemes had planned, but this would happen only four years later, and did not succeed. Later again, these troops participated in the war against the Empire of Brazil. His was not an enlightened government. He did not encourage education, nor commerce, nor public institutions, and did not undertake public works. He limited himself to administering what was there, defending the province from its enemies (especially the Chaco Indians), maintaining the roads and little else. He only managed to start one school in the capital.

He sent deputies to the National Congress meeting in Buenos Aires, the most prominent jurists and officials of Santiago. When they joined the Unitarian party of Bernardino Rivadavia he elected four others, including Colonel Manuel Dorrego, who would support the Federalist party. When the Congress passed a unitary constitution, he rejected it.

In 1825, Colonel Gregorio Aráoz de Lamadrid, sent by order of Rivadavia to the interior to raise a new contingent of troops for the war in Brazil, imposed a Unitarian government on Tucumán by force, and invaded Catamarca to install a Unitarian governor. The Riojano leader and commander Juan Facundo Quiroga called for Ibarra's help. But because of that, the governor of Salta, Colonel Major Juan Antonio Álvarez de Arenales sent an army to Santiago. Ibarra implemented a strategy that he would repeat several times, always successfully. He evacuated the capital and surrounding countryside and closed off the water supply to the city, while conducting a guerrilla war against the invaders, who had to retire.

Quiroga attacked and defeated Lamadrid, but retreated to San Juan, so Lamadrid regained power. Then Lamadrid was attacked by an army commanded by Quiroga and Ibarra and was defeated again in July 1827 in the Battle of Rincón de Valladares.

== Brief exile and return ==
On the fall of Rivadavia, he supported the government of Dorrego in Buenos Aires. But in December 1828, Dorrego was overthrown and executed by Colonel Major Juan Lavalle, leading returning veterans from the wars in Brazil and the Banda Oriental). Shortly afterwards Colonel Major (General) José María Paz invaded Córdoba and overthrew General Bustos. Ibarra believed in the promises of peace by Paz, but after the defeat of the forces from Rioja and Cuyana of Brigadier Facundo Quiroga in the Battle of Oncativo, Paz sent military forces to the provinces allied with Facundo, and installed Unitarian governments.

In May 1830, the forces of the Tucumán Governor, Colonel Javier López, and Salta's governor, Colonel José Ignacio Gorriti. invaded Santiago, with permission of Paz, and occupied the capital. Ibarra did not carry out his scorched earth tactics, and lost everything. He learnt the lesson, but in the meantime, had to flee to Santa Fe. His brother Francisco Antonio Ibarra brought together 3,000 men from Santiago in Loreto Department, where he was met and defeated by Colonel Juan Balmaceda.

In his place, Colonel Román Deheza was appointed, who signed the agreement that founded the League of the Interior, led by Paz. Several Santiago groups began a guerrilla war and expelled Deheza in April 1831, about the same time that Paz fell into the hands of Brigadier EstanislaoLópez (who, as commander in chief of the forces of the Federal Pact, at war with the League of Interior, had invaded eastern Córdoba and Buenos Aires with forces from Santa Fe in February 1831).

Ibarra did not rush back, and left a landowner named Santiago del Palacio to govern, while the decimated Unitarian army (which had retreated from Cordoba to Tucuman and was commanded by Colonel Major Lamadrid) was beaten four times by Quiroga (and which, after the disaster of Oncativo and forced exile in Buenos Aires, had returned with a handful of men to action, to ravage southern Córdoba, reconquering Cuyo and La Rioja and then moving to northern Argentina with a new army from Rioja, Cuyano and Catarmaca). In the last and most important of those battles, the Battle of La Ciudadela, on 4 November 1831, Ibarra (joining his Santiago forces with Quiroga) commanded part of the Federal cavalry. This battle ended the civil war for a while.

In February 1832, Ibarra was elected governor with the rank of Brigadier. He tried to force the adoption of a Federalist national constitution, but the new governor of Buenos Aires, Brigadier Juan Manuel de Rosas, convinced all the Federalist governors to delay. At the end of his two-year term, he had himself elected governor with full public power, and dissolved the legislature.

When in 1834 war broke out between Tucumán and Salta (which Ibarra discreetly supported), he received in his province a mediator sent by Buenos Aires, General Facundo Quiroga. Ibarra tried to persuade him not to return to Buenos Aires via Córdoba, for he had heard rumors of a possible murder, and while he was in Santiago territory protected him with a large army to the border with Córdoba. But Quiroga went to Cordoba and was killed in Barranca Yaco. Indirectly, this fact brought Rosas to power in the province and to dominance in the interior of the country, so Ibarra became a political dependent of Rosas. During the war against the Peruvian-Bolivian Confederation (led by Marshal Andrés de Santa Cruz), despite his show if support for Rosas in the conflict, Ibarra sent no contingent. The reason was that the commander in chief of the Argentine army in that front was the leader and governor of Tucuman, Colonel Major Alejandro Heredia, which besides dominating the province, dominated, indirectly, Catamarca, Salta and Jujuy and was Ibarra's enemy. At the end of the conflict in the north, Ibarra gave support with his troops to a revolution in Catamarca against Heredia. The situation would have ended in a war if not for the murder of Heredia in Lules in 1838.

== Another civil war ==
The peace did not last long: after the assassination of the governor of Tucumán, there were several nationwide revolts against Rosas. After the expulsion of the short-term Santa Fe Governor Domingo Cullen (successor to Estanislao López), he took refuge in Santiago, there he organized an alliance of governors that began with an invasion of Córdoba. This failed when Ibarra arrested Cullen and give him to Rosas, who had him shot outright. Several Northwest governors, who if not Unitarians were willing to ally with them to confront Rosas, formed an alliance in April 1840, known as the Northern Coalition. Ibarra was invited to join and even offered him political leadership of the group, but remained faithful to Rosas, mainly due to his dislike of the arrogant attitude of the "doctors" who ran the group.

General Gregorio Aráoz de Lamadrid (sent from Buenos Aires to recover the weapons used by Heredia in war against Marshal Santa Cruz) began operations against Santiago. A column of 500 men under the command of José Luis Cano left Catamarca and another of 1,000 men, commanded by Manuel Sola, left Salta. The goal was a joint offensive against the province, with the quickly advancing forces of Lamadrid. When Ibarra was threatened by a simultaneous invasion of three points of his province, he took the field at the head of 2,500 men. In late October this year, one of its divisions commanded by his nephew, Manuel Ibarra, collided on the banks of the river Salado with Solá column, defeating and chasing to the border with Salta. The Catamarca column suffered a similar fate, and the column of General Lamadrid, could not carry out its operational function but had to return when a major division, under the Tucumán Colonel Celedonio Gutiérrez, supplied assistance to Ibarra.

Combined with the invasion, a revolt broke out in the city, which resulted in the death of Ibarra's brother, Francisco. The revolution failed and the governor physically and economically persecuted his opponents, punishing them with exile, imprisonment and many executions. He took a fort in the middle of the Chaco forest, the Bracho, as a concentration camp, from which no one could escape. A famous Santiago heroine, Agustina Libarona, voluntarily accompanied her husband in the Bracho, until he died.

In the midst of this repression, he was again attacked by Unitarian forces from Catamarca and Salta, and Colonel Mariano Acha occupied the capital. But when Ibarra besieged it they had to evacuate the city. He participated, under the command of Uruguayan Brigadier Manuel Oribe, in the Battle of Famaillá (1841) as head of the left wing of the federal army, and used to place Gutierrez in the Tucumán government. He also helped his brother, Saravia, to get himself elected governor of Salta. That did not give him power over the neighboring provinces, but did guarantee a decade of peace.

== Final days ==
From the end of the war until Ibarra's death, nothing happened in Santiago. There were no civil wars, no public works, no political reforms. Economic growth was low, and there was no progress on the Indian border, although border activity intensified after 1840. On the occasion of the Anglo-French blockade of the Río de la Plata, Ibarra filed a proclamation to the people of Santiago dated 13 April 1845 . He suffered from gout from 1849. When he knew his death was near he made his will, in which he not only appointed executors for his goods, but also for the government of his province, which he placed under the protection of Rosas.

He died in the city of Santiago del Estero on 17 July 1851. After a short civil war among his heirs, one of them, Manuel Taboada, came to dominate the politics of Santiago for the next twenty-four years, aligned with the Unitarians.

He had been married to Buenaventura Saravia Arias, daughter of the Salta governor Manuel Alejandro Saravia, but soon sent her home. He did not remarry and had no legitimate descendants, but did have an illegitimate child, Absalón Ibarra, son of Cipriana Carol Lezana, and raised as a son Leandro Taboada, father of Antonino and Manuel Taboada, Unitarian warlords in the following years. These three would become governors of Santiago del Estero. Ibarra was the first governor of the province and was the longest ruling Argentine governor with thirty-one years in office, with a break of just over one year. Only Urquiza approached him, ruling from 1842 until 1870, with an interruption of four years.
