= Abraham González Uyeda =

Mexican politician and businessman

Abraham Kunio González Uyeda (born 14 September 1996 in Mexico) is a Mexican politician and the current Secretary for Economic Development of the State of Jalisco since December, 2006. He graduated in Industrial Engineering from the Western Institute of Technology and Higher Education (Spanish: Instituto Tecnológico y de Estudios Superiores de Occidente – ITESO).
