= José María del Campo =

Argentine priest and politician (1826–1884)

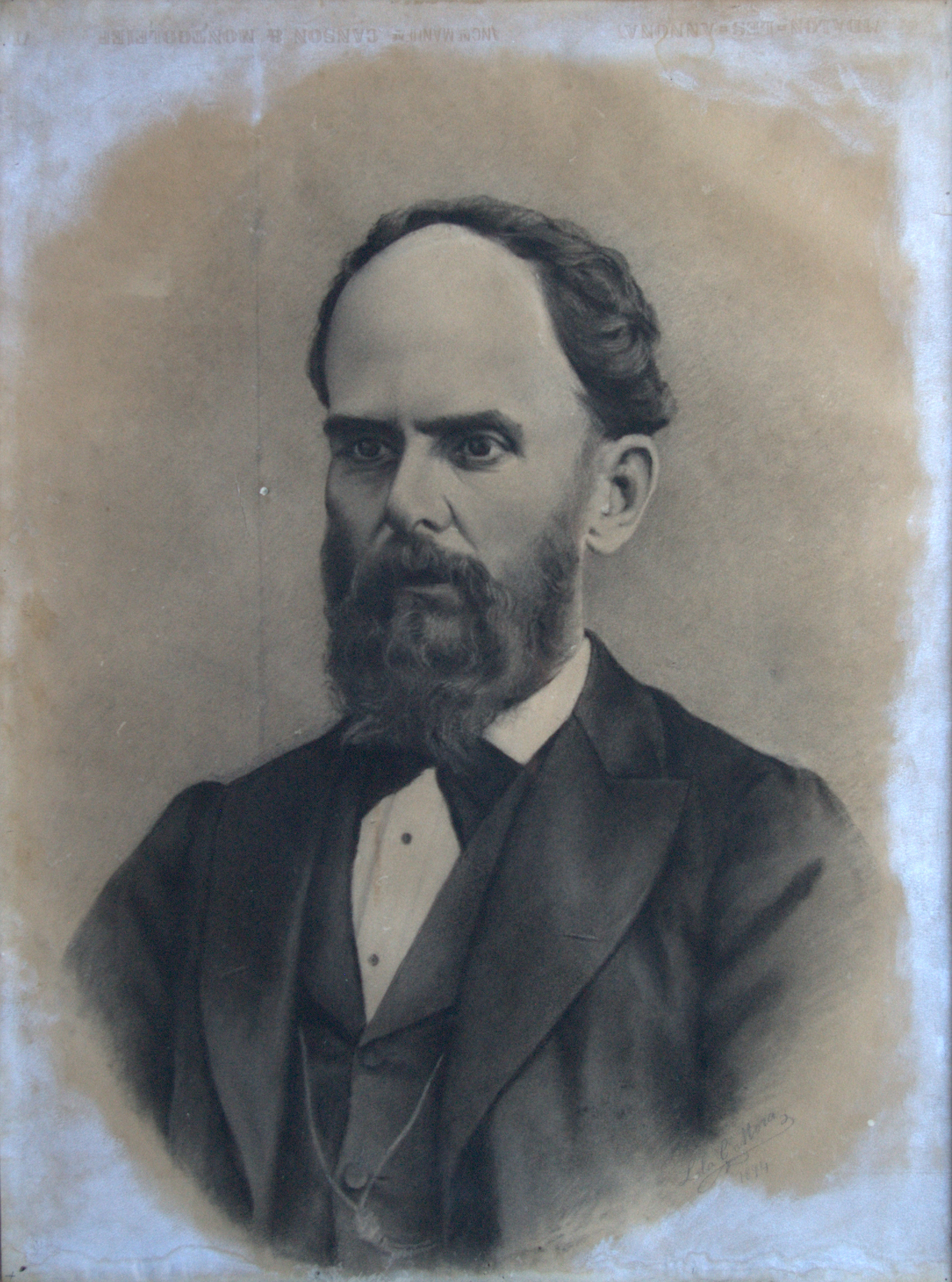
- Born: 1826
- Died: April 13, 1884 (aged 57–58)
- Occupations: Governor of the Province of Tucumán, Priest, Military
- Political party: Unitarian

José María del Campo (1826, Monteros, Tucumán Province – April 11, 1884, San Miguel de Tucumán) was an Argentine priest, Unitarian Party leader, and governor of the province of Tucumán. As Governor, he signed multiple laws, decrees, and declarations from 1853 to 1856.
