= Daniel Aráoz (footballer) =

Argentine footballer

Personal information
- Full name: Daniel Orlando Aráoz
- Date of birth: 14 September 1979 (age 47)
- Place of birth: Tucumán, Argentina
- Height: 1.68 m (5 ft 6 in)
- Position: Midfielder

Youth career
- Atlético Tucumán

Senior career*
Years	Team	Apps	(Gls)
1997–2001	Atlético Tucumán	69	(11)
2002	El Porvenir	10	(1)
2003	Atlético Tucumán	5	(0)
2003	→ Deportivo Colonia (loan)	7	(0)
2004	Estudiantes BA	9	(0)
2004–2005	Deportivo Español	6	(1)
2005–2006	Talleres de Perico	32	(6)
2006–2007	→ La Florida (loan)	31	(2)
2008	Talleres de Perico	10	(2)
2008–2009	Unión San Felipe	43	(4)
2010	Deportes La Serena	11	(0)
2011–2012	Gimnasia de Mendoza	8	(0)
2012	Atlético Famaillá	7	(1)
Total		247	(28)
Medal record
First place	Liga Tucumana de Fútbol	2003
First place	Copa Chile	2009
First place	Segunda División Profesional de Chile	2009
- * Club domestic league appearances and goals

Daniel Orlando Aráoz (born September 14, 1979, in Tucumán, Argentina) is a former Argentine footballer. He played in the position of attacking midfielder, and is a citizen of Argentina. With a market value at his peak on football club Deportes La Serena he was worth 150,000, retired as of January 1, 2013.

== Teams ==
- Atlético Tucumán: 1997-2001
- El Porvenir: 2002
- Deportivo Colonia: 2003
- Atlético Tucumán: 2003
- Estudiantes de Buenos Aires: 2004
- Deportivo Español: 2004–2005
- Talleres de Perico: 2005–2006
- La Florida: 2006–2007
- Talleres de Perico: 2008
- Unión San Felipe: 2008-2009
- Deportes La Serena: 2010
- Gimnasia de Mendoza: 2011–12
- Atlético Famaillá: 2012

== Titles ==
- Atlético Tucumán: 2003 Liga Tucumana de Fútbol
- Unión San Felipe: 2009 Torneo Apertura Primera B Championship, Primera B and Copa Chile

== Personal life ==
He is nicknamed Pillín.

== Post-retirement ==
Aráoz became a football agent, being the representative of players such as Franco Armani and Frank Fabra.
