= Santa María, Catamarca =

Santa María
- City
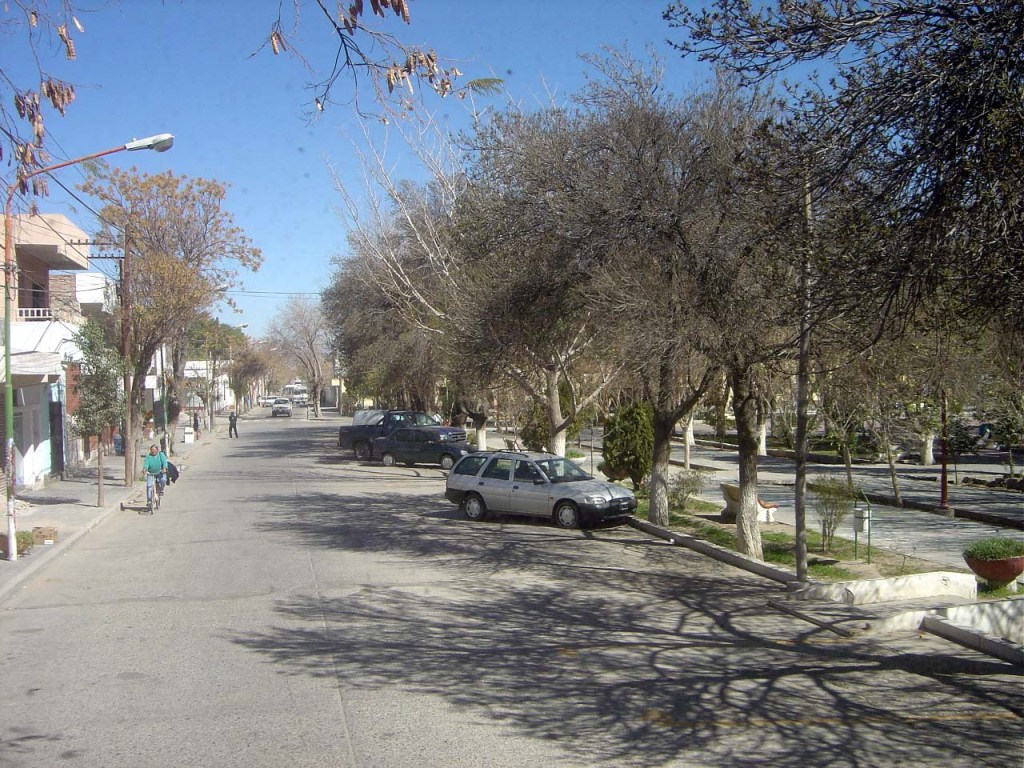
- Belgrano Plaza, Santa María.

- Coat of arms

- Location of Santa María in Argentina
- Coordinates: 26°41′S 66°2′W
- Country: Argentina
- Province: Catamarca
- Department: Santa María

Population (2010 census)
  - Total: 17,030
- Time zone: UTC−3 (ART)
- CPA base: K4139
- Dialing code: +54 3838

Santa María is a city in the province of Catamarca, Argentina. It has about 17,030 inhabitants per the 2010 census [INDEC], and is the head town of the department of the same name.

== Geography ==
=== Climate ===
Santa María has a cool arid climate (Köppen BWk). Summers feature hot afternoons, cool to pleasant mornings, and occasional rainfall from thunderstorms, whilst winters feature chilly to freezing mornings, warm afternoons, and essentially no precipitation.

Climate data for Santa María, Catamarca (1904–1950, extremes 1904–1950 and 1976–1986)
Month	Jan	Feb	Mar	Apr	May	Jun	Jul	Aug	Sep	Oct	Nov	Dec	Year
Record high °C (°F)	41.3 (106.3)	42.5 (108.5)	38.4 (101.1)	36.0 (96.8)	33.3 (91.9)	31.7 (89.1)	29.6 (85.3)	36.5 (97.7)	36.7 (98.1)	38.9 (102.0)	39.0 (102.2)	40.6 (105.1)	42.5 (108.5)
Mean daily maximum °C (°F)	30.2 (86.4)	29.5 (85.1)	28.2 (82.8)	25.8 (78.4)	22.3 (72.1)	19.8 (67.6)	19.8 (67.6)	22.6 (72.7)	25.5 (77.9)	27.4 (81.3)	29.5 (85.1)	30.4 (86.7)	25.9 (78.6)
Daily mean °C (°F)	21.8 (71.2)	21.3 (70.3)	19.8 (67.6)	16.5 (61.7)	12.7 (54.9)	10.0 (50.0)	9.6 (49.3)	11.9 (53.4)	15.1 (59.2)	17.6 (63.7)	20.1 (68.2)	21.4 (70.5)	16.5 (61.7)
Mean daily minimum °C (°F)	13.4 (56.1)	13.1 (55.6)	11.4 (52.5)	7.2 (45.0)	3.0 (37.4)	0.1 (32.2)	−0.6 (30.9)	1.2 (34.2)	4.7 (40.5)	7.8 (46.0)	10.7 (51.3)	12.4 (54.3)	7.0 (44.6)
Record low °C (°F)	4.5 (40.1)	5.0 (41.0)	−0.3 (31.5)	−5.0 (23.0)	−7.5 (18.5)	−11.6 (11.1)	−10.0 (14.0)	−11.5 (11.3)	−7.5 (18.5)	−4.0 (24.8)	−3.6 (25.5)	−1.5 (29.3)	−11.6 (11.1)
Average precipitation mm (inches)	44.1 (1.74)	33.1 (1.30)	22.3 (0.88)	2.0 (0.08)	1.0 (0.04)	0.4 (0.02)	1.6 (0.06)	1.0 (0.04)	0.4 (0.02)	10.7 (0.42)	17.5 (0.69)	36.7 (1.44)	170.8 (6.72)
Average relative humidity (%)	33	37	53	55	50	51	49	50	52	50	40	39	47
Source: Secretaria de Mineria
