= Battle of Rincón de Valladares =

Battle during Argentine Civil Wars

- Part of the Argentine Civil Wars
| Date | 6 July 1827 |
| Location | Between Famaillá and San Miguel de Tucumán, Argentina |
| Result | Federalist victory |

Belligerents
| Federales | Unitarians |

Commanders and leaders
| Facundo Quiroga | Juan Felipe Ibarra |

Strength
| Total: ~800 cavalry 200 from La Rioja and 600 from Santiago | Total: ~2,000 troops (Note: According to Quiroga's biographer, Lamadrid was cured of his wounds and had an army of 2,500 men under General Arenales in Salta, (...) Furiously wanting to avenge his defeat at El Tala, Lamadrid, took 2,000 men in search of Quiroga. His deputy, Colonel Bedoya, was directed against Ibarra, governor of Santiago, with 1,500 soldiers, .) c. 1,500 cavalry, 200 infantry y 4 cannons |

The Battle of Rincón de Valladares (6 July 1827) was a battle during the Argentine Civil Wars. It was fought between Federalist forces led by Facundo Quiroga and Unitarian forces under Governor Gregorio Aráoz de Lamadrid, near the city of San Miguel de Tucumán. Quiroga was the victor, forcing Lamadrid to resign and go into exile in Bolivia, leaving the government of Tucumán Province in the hands of the Federalists.

== Background ==
After Facundo Quiroga's victory in the Battle of El Tala in 1826, in which he thought Lamadrid had died, the leader from La Rioja Province went to Cuyo, where he assured the triumph of the Federalist party. Meanwhile, the wounded governor of Tucumán Province received support from Buenos Aires, where President Bernardino Rivadavia urged him to overthrow the provincial governments opposed to his rule. Lamadrid invaded Catamarca Province for the third time, where he restored a Unitarian government. He returned to face Facundo Quiroga, supported Juan Felipe Ibarra, Governor of Santiago del Estero Province. He advanced to the outskirts of the capital of Tucumán and attacked Quiroga in the Rincón de Valladares on 6 July 1827.

== The battle ==
The battle began with a Unitarian cavalry advance, which completely displaced the Federal cavalry. But the Federal infantry, commanded by Colonel Bargas, resisted the enemy onslaught and advanced to the center of Lamadrid's line. Part of Lamadrid's forces set about pursuing Santiago de Estero troops, who had left the battlefield, and Quiroga's reserve took advantage of the moment to destroy the remaining enemy lines. When the Tucumán cavalry returned from their pursuit and found the infantry had lost three quarters of its soldiers, they also retired. Casualties were very high on both sides. They increased when, days later, Quiroga had several officer prisoners shot.

== Aftermath ==
Lamadrid fled north to Salta Province, where Governo José Ignacio Gorriti refused to help him. He was forced to go into exile in Bolivia. Quiroga, meanwhile, ensured the dominance of Tucumán Province by the most prestigious Federalist politician of that province, Nicolás Laguna. This battle marked the end of the first war between Unitarians and Federalists in the interior. The forces of no more than three provinces were involved in each campaign, so the scope was limited. The cycle of the Argentine civil wars would change substantially in 1828, when many provinces would be involved, dividing the country into two opposing halves. This situation would be repeated at least twice, in 1840 and 1861.
