= Domingo Arévalo =

Paraguayan footballer (born 1968)

Personal information
- Date of birth: 15 September 1968 (age 58)
- Place of birth: Santiago, Paraguay
- Position: Forward

Senior career*
Years	Team	Apps	(Gls)
1992	Club River Plate (Asunción)		
1993–1994	Sol de América	9	(6)
1994–1995	→ Estudiantes de La Plata (loan)	17	(3)
1995	Sol de América	6	(4)
1996	→ Olimpia (loan)		
1997–1999	Sol de América	9	(5)
1999	→ Deportes Puerto Montt (loan)		
2000	→ Santiago Wanderers (loan)	20	(10)
2001–2004	Sol de América	14	(10)

International career
1999	Paraguay	3	(0)
- * Club domestic league appearances and goals

Domingo Arévalo (born 15 September 1968) is a Paraguayan footballer who played for clubs from Paraguay, Argentina and Chile and for the Paraguay national team.
