= Salta del Tucumán Intendancy =

Former territorial division of the Viceroyalty of the Río de la Plata

The intendancy of Salta del Tucumán, or Province of Salta del Tucumán, was one of the territorial divisions of the Viceroyalty of the Río de la Plata within the Spanish Empire, which existed between 1782 and 1814.

== History ==
In 1563, King Philip II of Spain created the Governorate of Tucumán and included it within the Viceroyalty of Peru, under the jurisdiction of the Royal Court of Charcas. This region included the current Argentine provinces of Tucumán, Salta, Córdoba, Santiago del Estero, Jujuy, Catamarca and La Rioja.

Two centuries later, due to the Bourbon reforms promoted by King Charles III, a reorganization of the administration was carried out in the American colonies of the Spanish Empire, with the aim of strengthening the State there and making it more effective. Consequently, the Viceroyalty of the Río de la Plata was created in 1776, emerging as a split from the enormous Viceroyalty of Peru. The Governorate of Tucumán became part of new Viceroyalty.

On 5 August 1783, King Charles III decided to replace the Governate of Tucumán by two Intendancies : Salta del Tucumán and Córdoba del Tucumán.

The intendancy of Salta del Tucumán was subdivided, in addition to the city of Salta, between the partidos (or subdelegations) of San Miguel de Tucumán, Santiago del Estero, San Fernando del Valle de Catamarca, San Salvador de Jujuy, San Ramón de la Nueva Orán, de la Puna (with capital in Santa Catalina) and Tarija (since 1807).

== Intendant Governors ==
- Andrés de Mestre (1783-1791), hitherto Governor of Tucumán.
- Ramón García de León y Pizarro (1791-1797)
- Tadeo Dávila (1797-1798) (acting)
- Rafael de la Luz (1798-1807)
- Tomás de Arrigunaga (1807-1808)
- José de Medeiros (1807-1809) (acting)
- Nicolás de Villacorta y Ocaña (acting)
- Nicolás Severo de Isasmendi (1809-1810) (acting)
- Joaquín Mestre (1810)
- José de Medeiros (1810)
- Nicolás Severo de Isasmendi (1810 - 23/08/1810)

=== First revolutionary stage ===
- Feliciano Chiclana (23/08/1810 - 24/12/1810)
- Tomás de Allende (24/12/1810 - 11/7/1811)
- Juan Martín de Pueyrredón (11/7/1811-14/7/1811)
- Junta Gubernativa (14/7/1811 - 14/9/1811)
- Pedro José Saravia (14/9/1811 - 29/1/1812)

=== Return of the Royal Governor ===
- Domingo García (29/1/1812 - 10/3/1812)
- Manuel Ramos (10/3/1812 - 22/8/1812)
- José E. Tirado (22/8/1812 - 11/9/1812)
- José Márquez de la Plata (11/9/1812 - 02/1813)

=== United Provinces of the Río de la Plata ===
- Juan José Feliciano Fernández Campero (02/1813 - 20/2/1813)
- Manuel Belgrano (1813)
- Esteban Agustín Gascón (21/2/1813 - 13/3/1813)
- Hermenegildo G. de Hoyos (13/3/1813 - 13/9/1813) - civil governor
- Eustoquio Díaz Vélez (13/3/1813 - 13/9/1813) - military governor
- Feliciano Antonio Chiclana (13/9/1813 - 26/10/1813)
- Rudecindo Alvarado (26/10/1813 - 29/11/1813)
- Francisco Fernández de la Cruz (29/11/1813 - 16/3/1814)
- Bernabé Aráoz (16/3/1814 - 25/4/1814)
- José Arteaga (25/4/1814 - 05/1814)
- José Antonio Fernández Cornejo (05/1814 - 11/1814)
