= San Isidro de Lules =

- Town
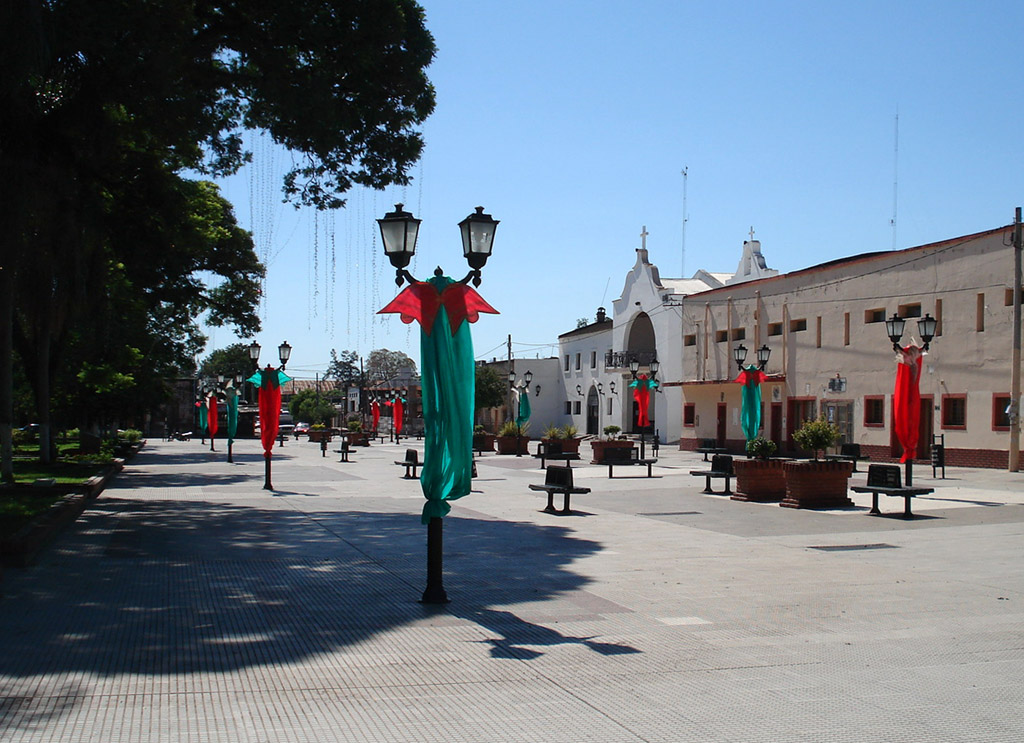

- Location of San Isidro de Lules in Argentina
- Coordinates: 26°56′S 65°21′W
- Country: Argentina
- Province: Tucumán
- Department: Lules

Government
  - Intendant: Marta Albarracín de Gallia (PJ)

Population (2010 census)
  - Total: 21,088
- Demonym: luleño/a
- Time zone: UTC−3 (ART)
- CPA base: T4128
- Dialing code: +54 0381

San Isidro de Lules, or, Lules, as the town is colloquially known, is a settlement in Tucumán Province in northern Argentina, and the seat of the department (county) of the same name.

Lules was founded by the parish priest of Famaillá, Dr. Zoilo Domínguez, on November 20, 1851, on the site of a former Jesuit reduction as an agricultural community, and named it in honor of the patron saint of farmers, Saint Isidore the Laborer (San Isidro), as well as for the area's indigenous people, the Lules tribe. Though Domínguez bequeathed the land to his five sons upon his death in 1865, he also intended to create a functioning community, and lots around the town square were auctioned to Lules Indians and other area residents. Domínguez also had a school and a Roman Catholic parish built, and the town was officially recognized as such by the province in 1887.

The town and surrounding fields became an important center of blueberry and strawberry production, and during the 20th century, Lules became home to numerous food processing plants, including makers of fresh and concentrated juices, as well as paper and textile mills, among others.
