= Bernabé Aráoz =

Governor of Tucumán Province

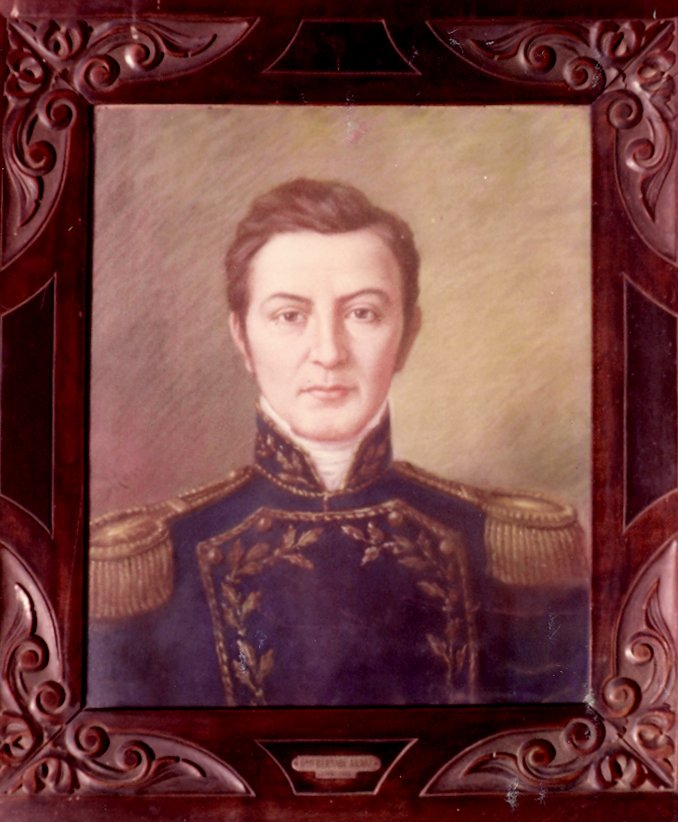
- Portrait by Honorio Mossi (1861–1943)

Governor of Tucumán Province
- In office 14 November 1814 – 6 October 1817
- Preceded by: none
- Succeeded by: Feliciano de la Mota Botello

Governor of Tucumán Province
- In office November 1819 – February 1820
- Preceded by: Feliciano de la Mota Botello
- Succeeded by: self

President of the Republic of Tucumán
- In office February 1820 – 28 November 1821
- Preceded by: self
- Succeeded by: Abraham González

Governor of Tucumán Province
- In office October 1822 – August 1823
- Succeeded by: Diego Aráoz

Personal details
- Born: 1776 Monteros
- Died: 24 March 1824 (aged 47–48) Trancas
- Party: Federal
- Occupation: Soldier
- Known for: Governor of Tucumán Province

Bernabé Aráoz (1776 – 24 March 1824) was a governor of Tucumán Province in what is now Argentina during the early nineteenth century, and President of the short-lived Republic of Tucumán.

Aráoz came from a wealthy and influential family in the northern province of Tucumán in the Spanish Viceroyalty of the Río de la Plata, and was a leader of the local militia. In 1810 he supported the May Revolution in which the leaders in Buenos Aires declared independence from the Napoleonic regime in Spain. He played a decisive role in the crucial Battle of Tucumán fought in 1812 against the royalists, and was made governor of his province.

The political situation became confused by a violent dispute between the Unitarian and Federalist parties. The Unitarians wanted a centralized form of government while the Federalists, with whom Aráoz sided, wanted greater local autonomy. The conflict degenerated into chaotic factional fighting at the same time as the struggle for independence. During a period when the central government had broken down, Aráoz declared that his province was a republic with himself as President. The next year he was deposed, but later came back as governor for another term. He was deposed again, forced into exile, arrested, brought back and executed without trial by a firing squad.

== Background ==
Bernabé Aráoz was born in Monteros, (Note: The Plaza Bernabé Aráoz in Monteros is named after the town's famous son.) Tucumán Province, in 1776. His family was one of the most influential and wealthy in San Miguel de Tucumán. He was one of six children of Juan Antonio Aráoz de La Madrid and Josefa de Córdoba Gutiérrez. Bernabé Aráoz was closely related to the statesman and priest Pedro Miguel Aráoz, who represented Tucumán at the 1816 Congress of Tucumán in which the delegates declared the independence of the United Provinces of the Río de la Plata (today called Argentina). Pedro Miguel Aráoz later helped Bernabé Araoz in forming the Republic of Tucumán. General Gregorio Aráoz de Lamadrid was his first cousin.

In 1803 Aráoz was leader of the new "Disciplined Cavalry Militia Regiment of Tucumán Volunteers". In 1805 he married Teresa Velarde. They would have seven children. He supported the May Revolution in Buenos Aires in 1810 without hesitation. In this movement the local leaders rejected the authority of the Spanish government after Napoleon had installed his brother Joseph Bonaparte as king. At first, the leaders professed loyalty to the deposed king Ferdinand VII of Spain of Spain. Later the movement would evolve into a fight for outright independence. In 1810 Aráoz was elected Mayor of the Cabildo on the second vote. Aráoz raised regular militiamen on behalf of the junta, making an important contribution to the roughly 3,000 soldiers stationed in the northern center of Tucumán.

In August 1812 General Manuel Belgrano had been ordered to retreat from the Spanish to a strong position at Córdoba, abandoning places such as Tucumán that lay further to the north. He sent Juan Ramón Balcarce to Tucumán with a request for money and 1,000 men. The people of Tucumán sent a delegation to Balcarce including Bernabé Aráoz, Rudecindo Alvarado and Pedro Miguel Aráoz that offered the money and 2,000 men if Belgrano would defend the town. Belgrano accepted, and this led to the Battle of Tucumán (24–25 September 1812) in which Belgrano defeated the Spanish forces. Bernabé Aráoz fought in this battle on the right wing as a subordinate to Balcarce. The support that Aráoz gave with his militia was decisive.

== Governor of Tucumán Province ==
On 4 April 1814, Bernabé Aráoz was made governor of the Province of Salta del Tucumán. On 8 October 1814 Gervasio Antonio de Posadas, the Supreme Director, divided the province into Salta Province and Tucumán Province. Tucumán Province included the former municipality of the same name and the adjoining municipalities of Catamarca and Santiago del Estero. Aráoz was designated governor of Tucumán Province. On 4 September 1815, separatists in Santiago del Estero led by Francisco Borges launched a first bid for independence, but Aráoz suppressed the movement.

After its disastrous defeat at the Battle of Sipe-Sipe (29 November 1815) the central government could provide little support to the northern provinces of Salta and Tucumán, which largely had to look after their own defense. In 1816 Ferdinand VII was declared "absolute King" of Spain. Aráoz hosted the Congress of Tucumán, in which delegates from all the provinces met, and on 9 July 1816 declared full independence of the United Provinces of the Río de la Plata from Spain. Many of the delegates were sympathetic to the monarchy, but in the end support for a republic prevailed. The struggle between those wanting strong central control and those favoring a looser federation would continue for many years. Araoz arranged accommodations and meeting places for the deputies. He even provided the table on which the declaration was signed, and this later was held as a prize possession by his family.

On 10 December 1816 Francisco Borges launched a second separatist movement in Santiago del Estero. General Belgrano suppressed the uprising and Borges was shot on 1 January 1817. Aráoz fell out with Belgrano, and in September 1817 he was replaced by Feliciano de la Mota Botello, from Catamarca. For the next two years Aráoz stayed out of politics. In November 1819 Feliciano de la Mota was deposed by Abraham González while General Belgrano was staying in Tucumán. Belgrano was also arrested, and was held until Bernabé Aráoz took control of the government of Tucumán three days later.

== President of the Republic of Tucumán ==
After the Battle of Cepeda on 1 February 1820 the central government was dissolved. Aráoz declared the Republic of Tucumán, made up of Tucumán, Catamarca and Santiago del Estero. In March 1820 he received an urgent request for assistance from General José de San Martín, commander of the armies fighting the Spanish. He replied that he was sending 500 men, well-supplied with arms and ammunition. A Congress of leading men was assembled, and on 6 September 1820 the Congress sanctioned the Republic's constitution. A First Court of Justice was established. Aráoz was named Supreme President. The constitution set up a unicameral legislature and an executive branch headed by the President. It was influenced by the national constitution of 1819 and was unitarian and centralized in nature.

The provinces of Catamarca and Santiago del Estero both quickly moved towards separation. Aráoz sent Juan Bautista Paz to Santiago del Estero to arrange for election of deputies, with a military force led by Juan Francisco Echauri. One of Echauri's first actions was to change the members of the municipality to one in favor of Tucumán. Next he tried to control the election of deputies for the Congress that would meet on 20 March 1820 in Tucumán. The people of Santiago del Estero rebelled, supported by armed forces led by Juan Felipe Ibarra, who defeated Echauri in an engagement on 31 March 1820 and forced him to retreat to Tucumán. Ibarra was appointed the first governor of the province of Santiago del Estero, and on 27 April 1820 issued a manifesto that declared the province's autonomy.

== Political turmoil ==
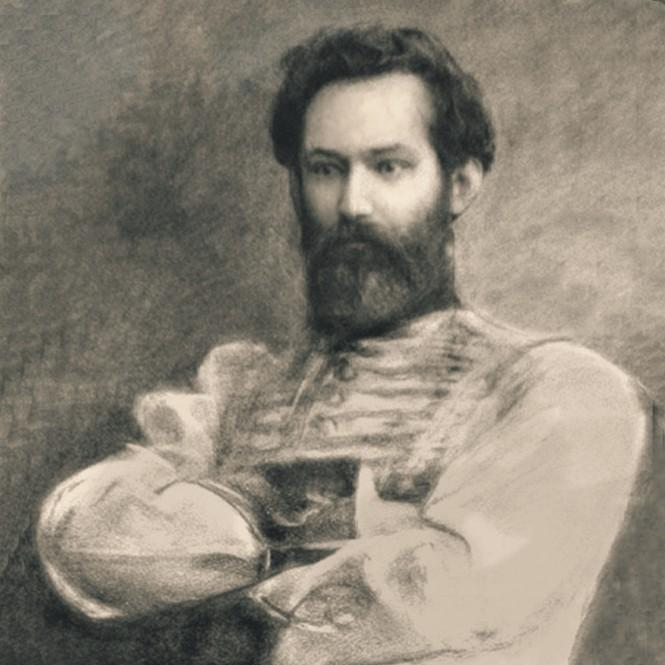
Martín Miguel de Güemes, Governor of Salta.

There was growing animosity between Bernabé Aráoz and the governor of Salta Province, Martín Miguel de Güemes. Güemes took the side of Santiago del Estero, invaded the Republic of Tucumán and captured Catamarca, ousting Bernabé Aráoz's relative, Lieutenant Governor Juan José de la Madrid, in March 1821. However, Güemes suffered a series of defeats and then was forced to return to Salta Province since the royalists had taken the opportunity to invade Jujuy. Aráoz invaded Salta, defeated Güemes on 3 April 1821 and temporarily deposed him, although Güemes quickly regained power. Soon after returning to the town of Salta, Güemes was assassinated, dying on 17 June 1821. After his death, an aristocratic group with strong ties to Buenos Aires took power. Eventually peace was settled between Tucumán and Santiago del Estero with a treaty of 5 June 1821.

On 28 November 1821 Aráoz was ousted from office by General Abraham González, who had helped him assume power in November 1819. The government of the province of Tucumán descended into chaos for the next year with endless coups and counter-coups. Colonel Diego Aráoz, a distant relative of Bernabé Aráoz, General Javier López and Bernabé Aráoz engaged in a three-way struggle for power. Bernabé Aráoz briefly held office twice during this period. In October 1822 he became governor yet again, this time holding office for almost a year, and managed to stabilize the situation. He was forced from office by Diego Aráoz in August 1823 and took refuge in Salta. In February 1824 the head of the provincial forces, Javier López, was appointed governor. The government of Salta withdrew asylum from Aráoz and escorted him to the Tucumán border.

== Death ==
Aráoz was arrested by Tucumán forces on 7 March 1824 at the border in Trancas, held there and executed on 24 March 1824. The colonel who ordered the execution said he had been trying to subvert the men. It is said that his final act before facing the firing squad was to smoke a cigarette. Knocking away the last ashes, he said philosophically "Human existence is like these ashes." He then calmly faced his death. His remains lie in the Trancas church to the right of the altar. His portrait by the Italian artist Honorio Mossi hangs in the Museo Casa Histórica de la Independencia in San Miguel de Tucumán.

After the Battle of Tucumán, General José de San Martín wrote of him that he doubted that there were ten men in the Americas who united so many virtues. Belgrano said he could not find high enough praise for men of Aráoz's command. General José María Paz knew Aráoz well. He said he did not know of anyone seeing him angry; he was always cool and unflappable. His manner and way of speaking was more suitable to a monk than a soldier. He made many promises, but was always careful to keep his word. He wanted only to rule, and if he deserves the name caudillo, (Note: caudillo may be translated "leader" or "military strongman") it was as a mild caudillo with no inclination to cruelty.
