= Republic of Tucumán =

Country in South America (1820–1821)

Federal Republic of Tucumán República Federal de Tucumán
- 1820–1821
- Flag Coat of arms

- Argentina showing the three provinces that formed the republic: Santiago del Estero (east), Tucumán (center) and Catamarca (west)
- Capital: San Miguel de Tucumán
- Common languages: Spanish
- Government: Republic
- Supreme President
  - May 19, 1820 — August 29, 1821: Bernabé Araoz
- History
  - Established: March 22, 1820
  - Santiago del Estero's Secession: April 27, 1820 (Recognized June 5, 1821)
  - Catamarca's Occupation: June 5, 1821
  - Catamarca's Secession: August 25, 1821
  - Dissolved: August 29, 1821 1821
- Currency: Tucuman Real (Federal Currency of Tucuman)
Preceded by
Tucumán Province
Succeeded by
Tucumán Province
Santiago del Estero Province
Catamarca Province
- Today part of: Argentina

The Republic of Tucumán (República de Tucumán) was a short-lived state centered on the town of San Miguel de Tucumán in today's Argentina that was formed after the collapse of central authority in 1820, and that broke up the next year. The "Republic" remained a political unit within the United Provinces of the Río de la Plata.

== Background ==
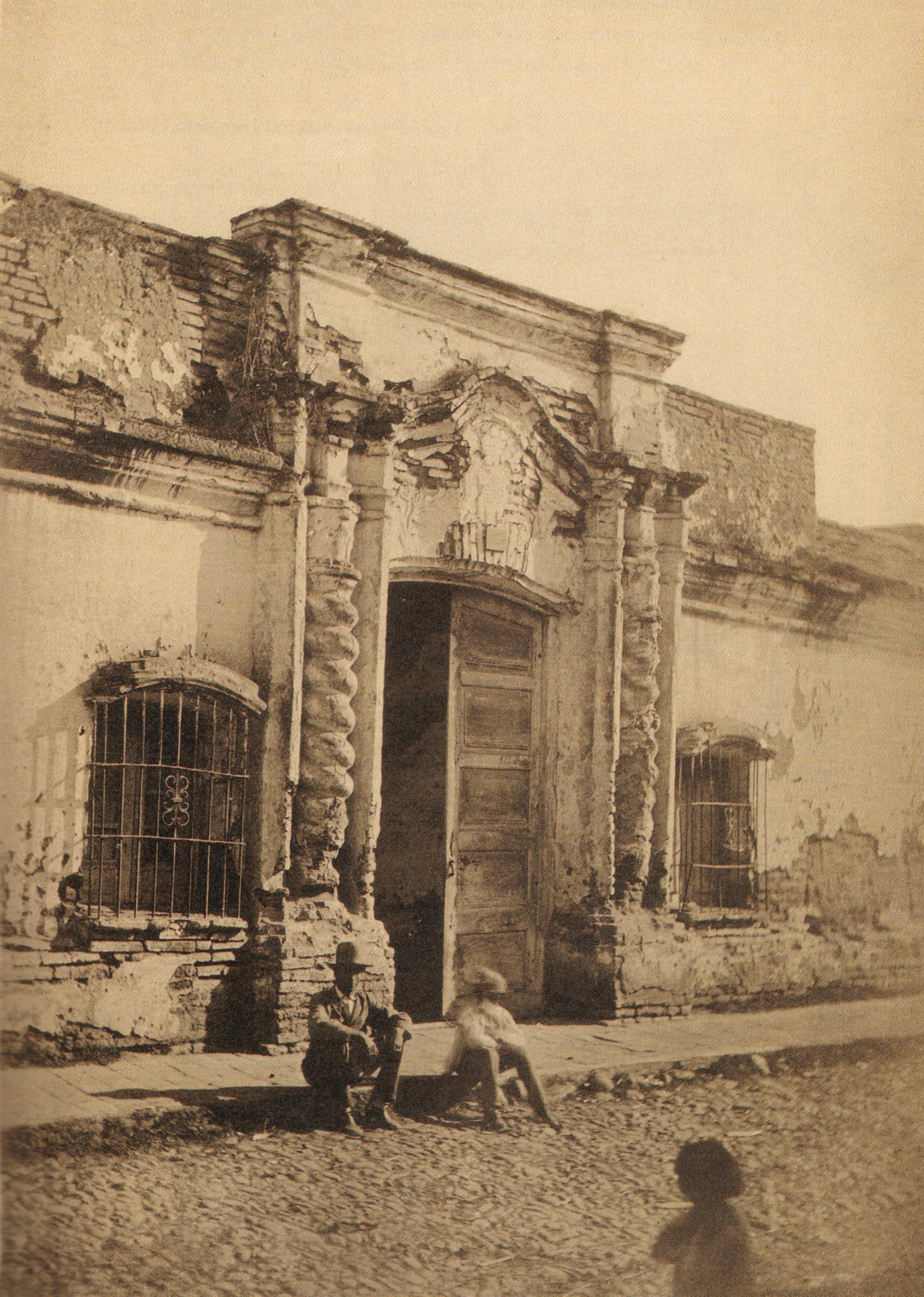
The old Casa de Tucumán, where the independence of the United Provinces of the Río de la Plata (Now Argentina) was proclaimed in 1816. Photograph from 1868

In 1810 news arrived of the May Revolution in Buenos Aires, capital of the Viceroyalty of the Río de la Plata. The council of Santiago del Estero reacted cautiously at first, but when it was clear that the nearby Salta Province was supporting the revolution, Santiago del Estero also joined. On 8 October 1814 the Supreme Director Gervasio Antonio de Posadas issued a decree saying the jurisdictions of Salta, Jujuy, Oran, Tarija and Santa Maria should be combined into the Salta Province with capital in the town of Salta. The remainder of the former Intendencia de Salta del Tucumán would become the new Tucumán Province, consisting of Tucumán, Santiago del Estero and Catamarca.

This decree stirred up the traditional rivalry between Tucumán and Santiago del Estero. On 4 September 1815, separatists in Santiago led by Juan Francisco Borges launched the first bid for independence, but it was suppressed by governor Bernabé Aráoz. On 20 April 1816 the Santiago del Estero deputies Pedro León Gallo and Pedro Francisco de Uriarte joined the Congress of Tucumán, where the independence of the United Provinces of the Río de la Plata was declared. In November 1816 the Congress authorized the first version of the provisional regulations, changing the method of electing governors and deputy governors and making the appointments subject to the approval of the Supreme Director. On 10 December 1816, a second revolutionary movement was launched in Santiago del Estero, again led by Borges. Manuel Belgrano suppressed the uprising and Borges was shot on 1 January 1817.

Towns at that time were small. As late as 1841, the towns of Catamarca and Santiago del Estero each had about 4,000 inhabitants, while Tucumán had 8,000 inhabitants.

== Creation of the republic ==
After the Battle of Cepeda on 1 February 1820 the central government was dissolved. Governor Aráoz declared the Republic of Tucumán, made up of the provinces of Tucumán, Catamarca and Santiago del Estero. This republic, and others formed at the time such as the Republic of Entre Ríos, were set up in the expectation that they would soon be united into a larger political grouping, perhaps even a confederacy uniting the provinces of the former Spanish Viceroyalties of Río de la Plata, Chile, and Peru.

A constitution was needed for the republic, and a council of leaders of the former provinces was called to define how it would be organized. On 6 September 1820, the council sanctioned the Republic's constitution, which abolished the council and made its members ministers. A First Court of Justice was established. Aráoz was named Supreme President. The constitution set up a unicameral legislature and an executive branch headed by the President. It was influenced by the national constitution of 1819 and was unitarian and centralized in nature. This alienated the province of Catamarca as well as Santiago del Estero, both of which moved towards separation.

== Secession of Santiago del Estero ==
The people of Santiago del Estero were inclined to autonomy. Aráoz sent Juan Bautista Paz to arrange the election of deputies, with a military force led by Juan Francisco Echauri. One of Echauri's first actions was to change the members of the municipality to people in favor of Tucumán. Next he tried to control the election of deputies for the Congress that would meet on 20 March 1820 in Tucumán. The people of Santiago del Estero rebelled, supported by armed forces from the Fuerte de Abipones led by Juan Felipe Ibarra, who defeated Echauri in an engagement on 31 March 1820 and forced him to retreat to Tucumán. Ibarra was appointed the first governor of the province of Santiago del Estero, and on 27 April 1820 issued a manifesto that declared the province's autonomy. Eventually peace was settled between Tucumán and Santiago with a treaty of 5 June 1821.

The government of the province of Tucumán was unstable, and in 1822 descended into chaos. A new legislature chaired by the Dominican friar Manuel Perez took control in 1823. General Bernabé Araoz was executed in 1824. His remains lie in the San Miguel de Tucumán church.
