= Alejandro Heredia =

Argentine soldier and politician

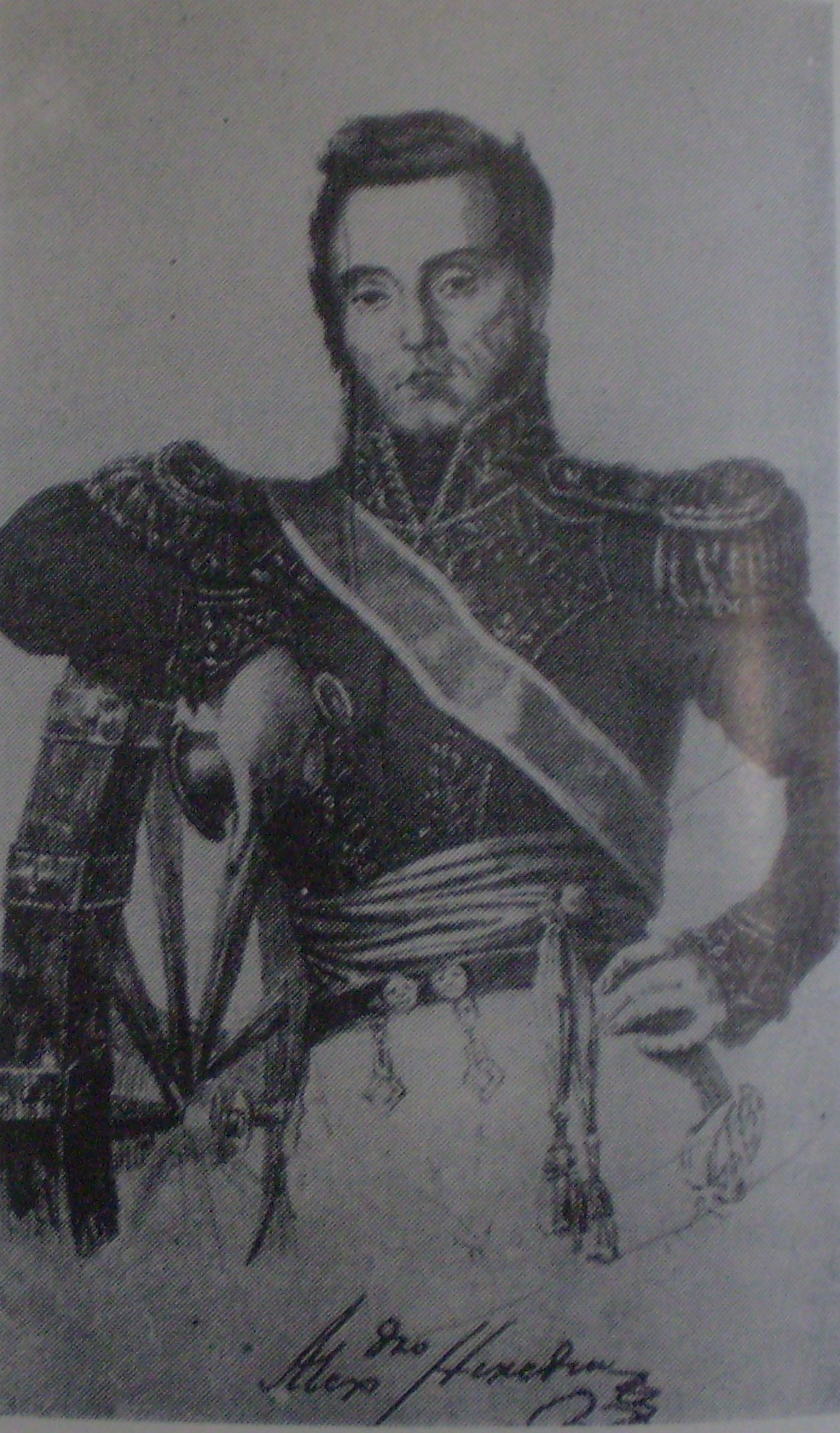

Governor of Tucumán Province
- In office 4 November 1831 – 12 November 1838
- Preceded by: José Frías
- Succeeded by: Bernabé Piedrabuena

Personal details
- Born: 1788 San Miguel de Tucumán
- Died: 12 November 1838 (aged 49–50) Lules
- Party: Federal
- Occupation: Soldier

Alejandro Heredia (1788 – 12 November 1838) was an Argentine soldier and politician. He fought in the war of independence, and in the subsequent civil war. He was governor and caudillo of Tucumán Province.

== Early career ==
Alejandro Heredia was born in San Miguel de Tucumán in 1788, and was educated at the College of Our Lady of Loreto in Córdoba. He studied at the National University of Córdoba, gaining a Doctorate in Law. A well-educated man, he studied classical literature and later taught Latin to his protege, Juan Bautista Alberdi.

After the May Revolution of 1810, when Buenos Aires declared independence from Spain, Heredia joined the Army of the North. General Manuel Belgrano dispatched him on a diplomatic mission to talk with the royalist general José Manuel de Goyeneche. As a soldier, he distinguished himself as a lieutenant in the Battle of Tucumán (1812), then fought in the Battle of Salta (1813) and the Battle of Sipe-Sipe (1815). He reached the rank of colonel in the Army of the North, and was among the leaders of the historic Arequito Revolt (1820), where a group of army officers refused to fight in the civil war against the Federalists.

After this event, Heredia was sent to Salta Province, to be under the command of Martín Miguel de Güemes, Governor of Salta. In 1824 he represented Tucumán at the National Constitution Congress in Buenos Aires and in 1826 represented Salta. At the congress sessions he was noted for his Federalist views.

== Governor of Tucumán ==
In 1832, after the defeat of Gregorio Aráoz de Lamadrid by Facundo Quiroga, Heredia was elected governor of Tucumán, and the province joined the Argentina Confederation that emerged from the Federal Pact of January 1831. Heredia succeeded José Frias. Under the constitutional code he was granted extraordinary powers. He put an end to various abuses that Quiroga had introduced.

In 1834, during the provisional national government of Manuel Vicente Maza, civil war broke out between Heredia and Governor Pablo de Latorre of Salta. Maza consulted with Juan Manuel de Rosas, then sent Quiroga, former caudillo of La Rioja, to mediate. Before Quiroga could complete his mission, he learned that Latorre had been defeated and killed. (Note: Quiroga was killed while returning to Buenos Aires from his abandoned mission of mediation.) On January 23, 1836 General Francisco Javier López invaded Tucumán Province with a force of troops from Salta. Heredia attacked and defeated López on the banks of the Rio Famaillá. Two days later Javier López and his secretary Angel López were shot. Colonel Juan Balmaceda was allowed to live, but was deported to Santiago del Estero.

On 28 January, Alejandro Heredia concluded a pact with Catamarca Province, signed by Napoleón Boneti for Catamarca and Juan Bautista Paz for Tucumán. Heredia now became the central figure in the north, giving the governorship of Salta to his brother Felipe Heredia. On 18 April 1836 the Tucumán House of Representatives re-elected Heredia as governor. During Heredia's rule as governor, an office achieved by popular vote, he was a man of progress and order. According to Manuel Borda Lizondo he was the most cultured and progressive of the governors of Tucumán between 1810 and 1853, and his government ranked highest among all its neighbors. He believed in the possibility of fusing the Federalist and Unitarian parties in his province, but this proved unrealistic.

== War with Bolivia ==
In 1837, Juan Manuel de Rosas's government declared war on the Peru–Bolivian Confederation under the command of Andrés de Santa Cruz. In May 1837 Alejandro Heredia was appointed commanding general of the Argentine army operations. Rosas was concerned about the growing power of the Confederation in the north, and also wanted to crush anti-Federalist exiles in Bolivia. Heredia launched an invasion of Bolivia with his own forces and reinforcements sent by Rosas, but his army was defeated at the Battle of Montenegro.

== Death ==
Alejandro Heredia was killed on 12 November 1838, at a place called Los Lules, three leagues from San Miguel de Tucumán, when travelling in a carriage with his son to his country house. He was attacked by an armed party headed by Commander Gabino Robles, Vicente Neirot, Lucio Casas and Gregorio Uriarte. Heredia was shot in his head by a pistol. The murderers took the carriage and left the body of Heredia, who was still breathing, with his son. The Governor's body remained there two days, during which time it was mutilated by birds.

The Unitarian Marco Avellaneda, one of Heredia's protégés, was among the conspirators. He was taken for trial in San José de Metán in 1841. In his implausible defense, Avellaneda said he had hired the horses to the conspirators without knowing their intention, and was at the scene of the crime scene by chance since he had ridden to Lules to visit a relative, whom he did not identify. He explained that he went to Tucumán with the murderers shouting "the tyrant is dead!" because he was forced to follow, and he was pressured by the murderers to join the meeting of the Legislature that night to elect a new governor. Marco Avellaneda was convicted and sentenced to death as the instigator and main culprit of Heredia's death. His head was displayed on a pike in the Plaza de Tucumán.
