= La Florida y Luisiana =

Place in Tucumán Province, Argentina

Coordinates: 27.2333°S 65.5667°W

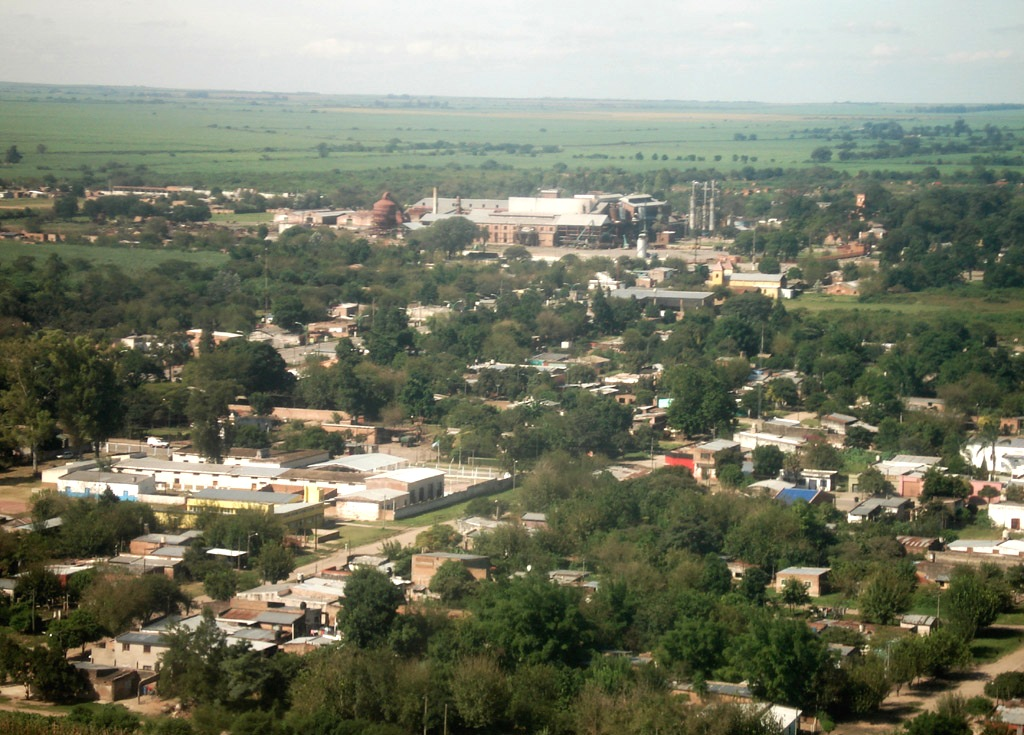
Aerial view of the town of La Florida, Depto. Cruz Alta, Tucumán.

La Florida y Luisiana is a rural community ('Comuna Rural') in Cruz Alta Department, Tucumán Province, Argentina. It lies to the east of Alderetes, which is part of the Greater Tucumán metropolitan area. It is also home to the La Florida football team.

== Population ==
According to the 2010 census, La Florida had a population of 5,959, an increase of 15% from the 5,297 recorded in the 2001 census. These figures include the population of the La Florida Sugar Mill (Ingenio La Florida).

La Florida forms part of the urban agglomeration of Delfín Gallo, Colombres, and La Florida, which had a combined population of 19,873 in 2010.
