= Manuel Taboada =

Argentine politician

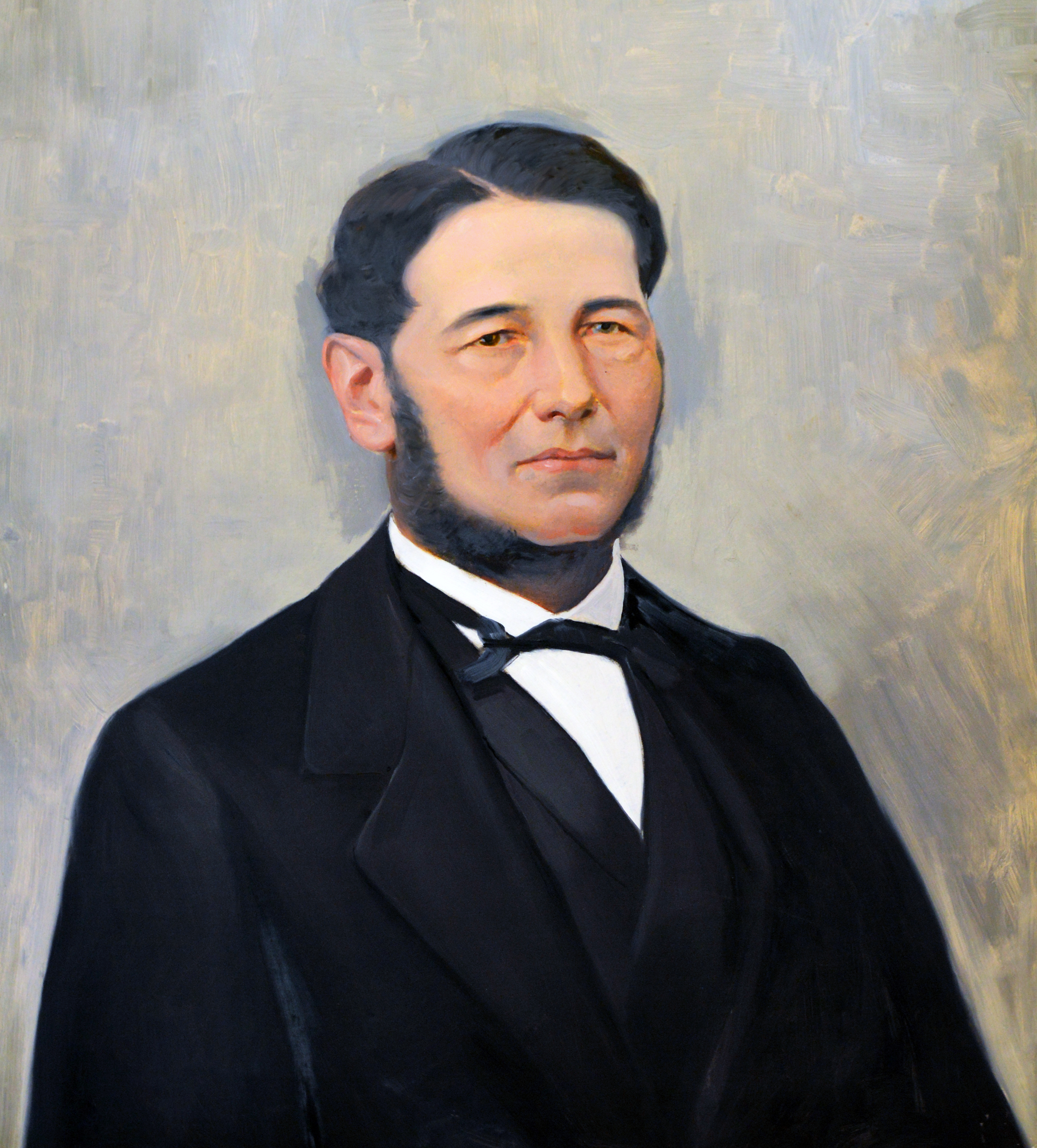

Governor of Santiago del Estero
- In office 5 October 1851 – 23 November 1857
- Preceded by: Mauro Carranza
- Succeeded by: Juan Francisco Borges
- In office 8 June 1862 – 8 June 1864
- Preceded by: Pablo Lascano Vieyra
- Succeeded by: Absalón Ibarra
- In office 1 December 1867 – 1 December 1870
- Preceded by: Gaspar Taboada
- Succeeded by: Alejandro Segundo Montes

Personal details
- Born: February 27, 1817 Villa Matará, United Provinces of the Río de la Plata
- Died: September 7, 1871 (aged 54) Santiago del Estero, Argentina
- Party: Unitarian Party
- Parents: Leandro Taboada (father); Águeda Ibarra (mother)
- Occupation: Officer and estanciero

Military service
- Rank: General

Manuel Baldomero Taboada (Villa Matará, Sarmiento Department, Santiago del Estero Province, 27 February 1817 – Santiago del Estero, 7 September 1871) was an Argentine politician, general, governor of Santiago del Estero for more than 20 years, and an ally of President Bartolomé Mitre.

== Early life and family ==
=== Origins ===
The Taboada family hailed from a noble landowning ancestry originating in Lugo, Navarre and, Castile. Of note are members of the Spanish nobility —such as the counts Taboada y Castro— who fought for the Spanish Grandees, while individuals such as Francisco Gil de Taboada were known for commanding colonial expeditions and administration in Peru.

Manuel was the son of Águeda Ibarra Paz y Figueroa, younger sister of brigadier general Juan Felipe Ibarra, who founded Santiago del Estero Province and governed it for 30 years, until his death. His father was Leandro Taboada, who served in the Patricios Santiagueños Battalion commanded by Juan Francisco Borges. On his father's side, Manuel was the nephew of Tomás Juan de Taboada, lieutenant governor of Santiago del Estero in 1815.

His older brother was Antonino Taboada, an officer who fought under Juan Lavalle against Juan Manuel de Rosas, thereafter becoming a general. Among his eight younger brothers, of note, were Gaspar Taboada, a businessman, and Felipe Taboada, the first painter and sculptor of importance in Santiago del Estero.

=== Childhood and youth ===
Little is known of Manuel's childhood, except that he travelled with his brother Antonino to Buenos Aires in the 1830s and returned in the 1840s. From an early age, he stood out as a political man among his brothers.

Around 1840 he was appointed governor Absalón Ibarra's adjutant and, from 1843, his private secretary. While he did not befriend Ibarra's inner circle, he managed to surround himself with a group of like-minded young people who yearned for change.

Around ten years later, in 1850, Manuel Taboada distanced himself from Ibarra due to a disagreement over the use of certain funds sent to him by Juan Manuel de Rosas. He was, nevertheless, considered to be the most suitable leader to succeed Ibarra as province governor.

On the same day that Ibarra died, 15 July 1851, Mauro Carranza, Manuel's cousin, was elected interim governor. Carranza, in an effort to organise his government, called for elections to reinstall the legislative body in the province, which had not existed for the last fifteen years. Taboada, meanwhile, set about organising the elections, leading to many of the candidates on the ballot being his relatives and friends.

Elections were held on 26 September 1851, with the results favouring Taboada and his party significantly. However, the interim governor declared the elections null and void, arguing that fraud had been committed, that laws had been violated, and that Taboada had trampled on the freedom of suffrage. Carranza convoked elections anew and, in order to ensure his victory, removed those candidates loyal to the Taboada family. Thusly, Mauro Carranza was elected governor, with only 38 votes out of the 200 citizens who were eligible.

== Political career ==
=== First Term ===
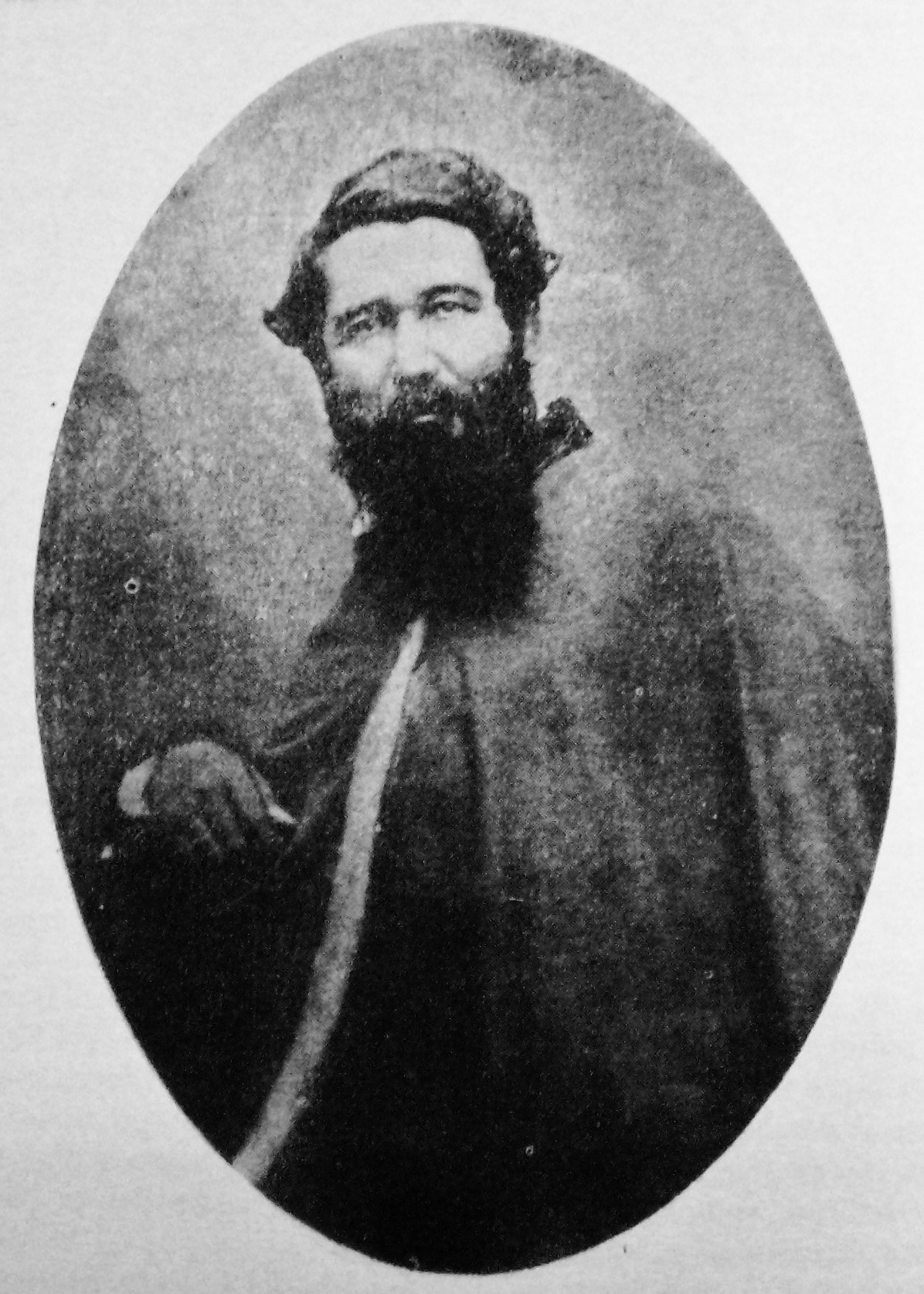
General Antonino Taboada, Manuel Taboada's brother

==== Power struggle ====
Manuel and his brother, Antonino, gathered a montonera of gauchos in the interior of the province, with which they laid siege to the provincial capital. Confronted with this threat, Carranza delegated leadership to Pío Achával and left for Tucumán Province to seek military support. Manuel managed to occupy the capital on 5 October 1851, convening the legislature on the same day. The representatives elected according to the results annulled by Carranza were sworn in, and they appointed Manuel Toboada provincial governor.

Meanwhile, general Celedonio Gutiérrez answered Carranza's call for military aid, and assembled forces to reinstate him as governor. There were two small battles against the raised provincial army of Antonino Taboada, both ending in defeat for Gutiérrez's forces: on 10 December 1851, Antonino defeated Manuel Ibarra's forces in the Battle of Tronco Rabón; then in the Battle of Gramilla, he defeated Pío Achaval's militia on 17 January 1852.

==== Support for Urquiza ====
During the confrontation between Juan Manuel de Rosas and general Justo José de Urquiza, Manuel initially showed his support for the former. A few days after taking office as governor, he sent a letter to Rosas, in which he explained the details of the revolt against Carranza, the causes of the uprising and the endorsement of Rosas as national leader. At the same time, he appointed Eduardo Lahitte as his representative in Buenos Aires.

However, when the news of the Battle of Caseros and Rosas' fall arrived on 3 February 1852, it caused a radical change in the political orientation of Taboada's government. Manuel and Antonino Taboada pronounced themselves in favour of Urquiza and on 13 March, consequently with the change of political orientation, a law was passed by which all of ex-governor Absalón Ibarra's assets were confiscated. The decision, rather than having been motivated by the economic significance of the assets, was driven by the fact that the heirs to them were allies of Carranza. In addition, Ibarra was accused of having arbitrarily administered the province's funds and of failing to render accounts. Ibarra's former home, located in what is now Avellaneda Street, became the Government Building, while his assets were placed at the disposal of the provincial executive.

On 31 May 1852 Manuel travelled to San Nicolás de los Arroyos, where he signed the San Nicolás Agreement, which laid the foundations for organising the institutions of the republic and sanctioning the National Constitution of 1853. Taboada was the youngest governor present.

==== Civil war in the north ====
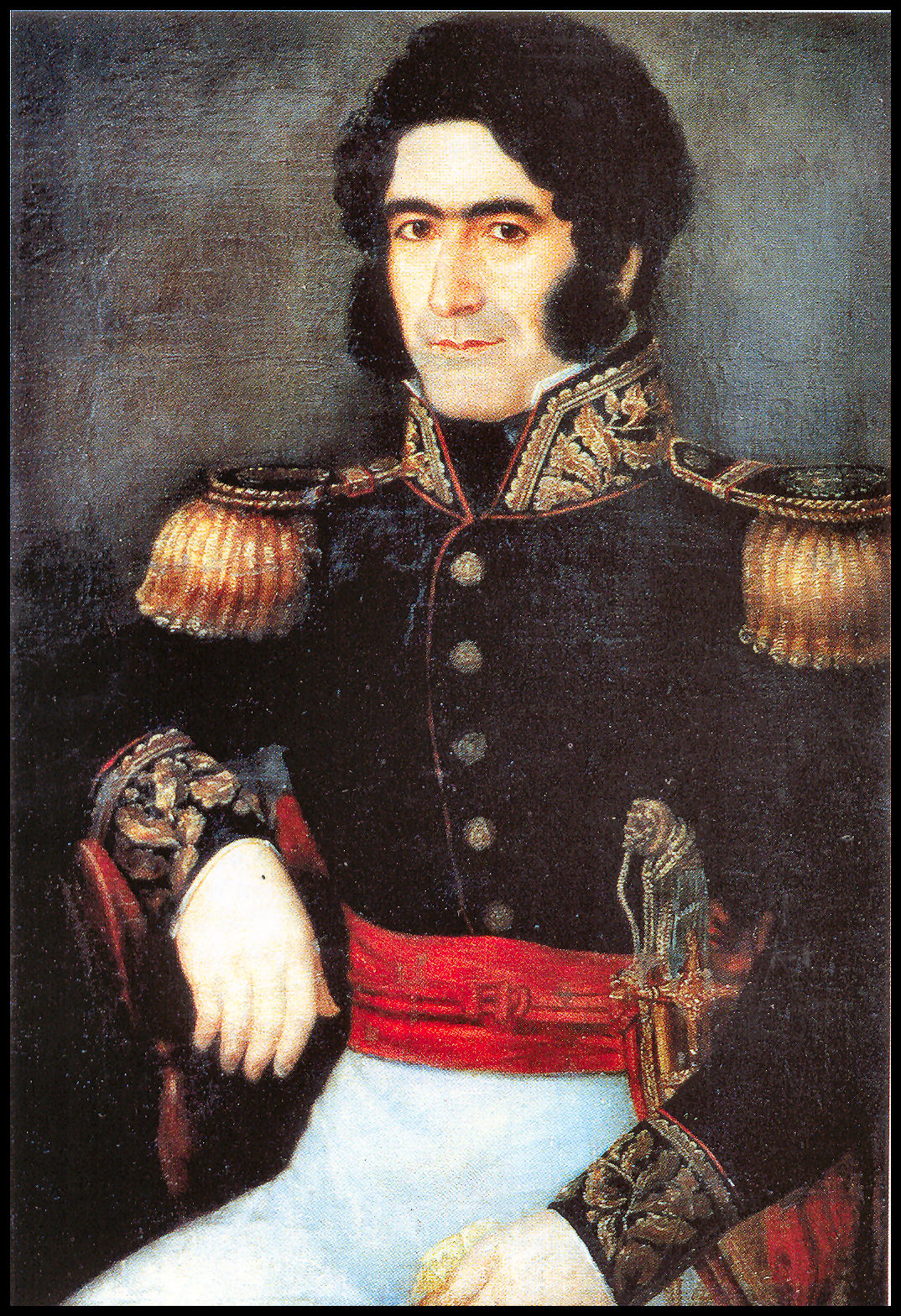
General Celedonio Gutiérrez, governor of Tucumán

On his return, Manuel Taboada gave his support to the unitarians of Tucumán, who had overthrown the pro-Rosas governor Celedonio Gutiérrez. However, despite Antonino Taboada's assistance, Gutiérrez managed to regain power in January 1853, ousting Manuel Alejandro Espinosa, who went into exile in Santiago del Estero. Antonino, together with Espinosa and the priest José María del Campo, reorganised his forces, but was defeated by Gutiérrez's troops at the Battle of Arroyo del Rey on 21 February 1853. Espinosa was killed in battle.

Despite the defeat, Manuel Taboada refused to recognise Gutiérrez's authority as governor of Tucumán Province. The provisional head of the Argentine Confederation, Justo José de Urquiza, initially refrained from taking sides. However, in seeking to consolidate his influence over the provinces, he considered pacifying the north a priority. To that end, he sent communications to the northern provinces urging them to recognise Gutiérrez and refrain from military action. The governors of the provinces of Catamarca and Jujuy officially complied with the directive and the governor of Salta, for his part, partially complied by withdrawing his troops from the Tucumán frontier. Only Manuel Taboada maintained a belligerent stance, arguing that Gutiérrez's presence was a threat to order in Santiago del Estero, as he tried to convince Urquiza of the legitimacy of his position.

Urquiza appointed Miguel Rueda and colonel Manuel Puch to mediate in the provinces of Córdoba, Santiago del Estero, Salta and Tucumán, with the aim of restoring peace in the region. The mission failed due to Gutiérrez's refusal to meet Manuel Taboada without prior recognition from his administration. Other attempts at mediation, promoted by the administrations of Salta and Jujuy, also failed. Even a new initiative, promoted by the governor of Santiago del Estero and involving general Rudecindo Alvarado, was unsuccessful.

Faced with this diplomatic stalemate, in June 1853, forces from Santiago del Estero invaded the province of Tucumán, in open violation of the ratified 1853 Constitution. In response, in early October, Gutiérrez counterattacked by invading Santiago del Estero through the Río Hondo Department, advancing in two columns: one commanded by Manuel Ibarra and the other by José S. Coronel. After defeating Taboada's forces, Gutiérrez occupied the provincial capital with a contingent of three thousand men. The Taboada forces retreated south, and Manuel delegated command to Pedro P. Olaechea, who ruled interim from 4 October 1853 to March 1854.

The climactic confrontation took place at the Battle of Tacanitas on 21 October. During the battle, the leader of the Tucumán forces, Tomás Lobo, challenged Manuel Taboada to a duel. The latter accepted, and in the ensuing melee he struck Lobo in the head with a sabre blow. With this victory, Gutiérrez's vanguard was defeated, and he was forced to abandon Santiago del Estero in the face of the Taboada's renewed invasion of his province. Simultaneously, José María del Campo organised an uprising in Tucumán and assumed de facto governorship. When Gutiérrez returned to the Tucumán capital, Campo withdrew to Monteros, where he agreed to military aid from Santiago del Estero.

In order to mediate the conflict, the national government appointed a commission composed of Presbyter Benjamin Lavaysse and colonel Marcos Paz. However, the two commissioners' unitarian affiliation generated mistrust, and the negotiations failed. As a result, Gutiérrez was declared a usurper and a rebel. Finally, on 25 December 1853, the Taboada forces defeated Gutiérrez at the Battle of Los Laureles. Gutiérrez fled to Bolivia.

From then on, Manuel Taboada emerged as the leader of the Liberal Party —successor to the Unitarian Party– in northern Argentina. Although he managed to establish alliances in Salta and other provinces, these did not achieve the same level of success.

On 25 November 1853, Manuel Taboada was elected governor by the provincial legislature for a new term.

=== Second Term ===
==== Education ====
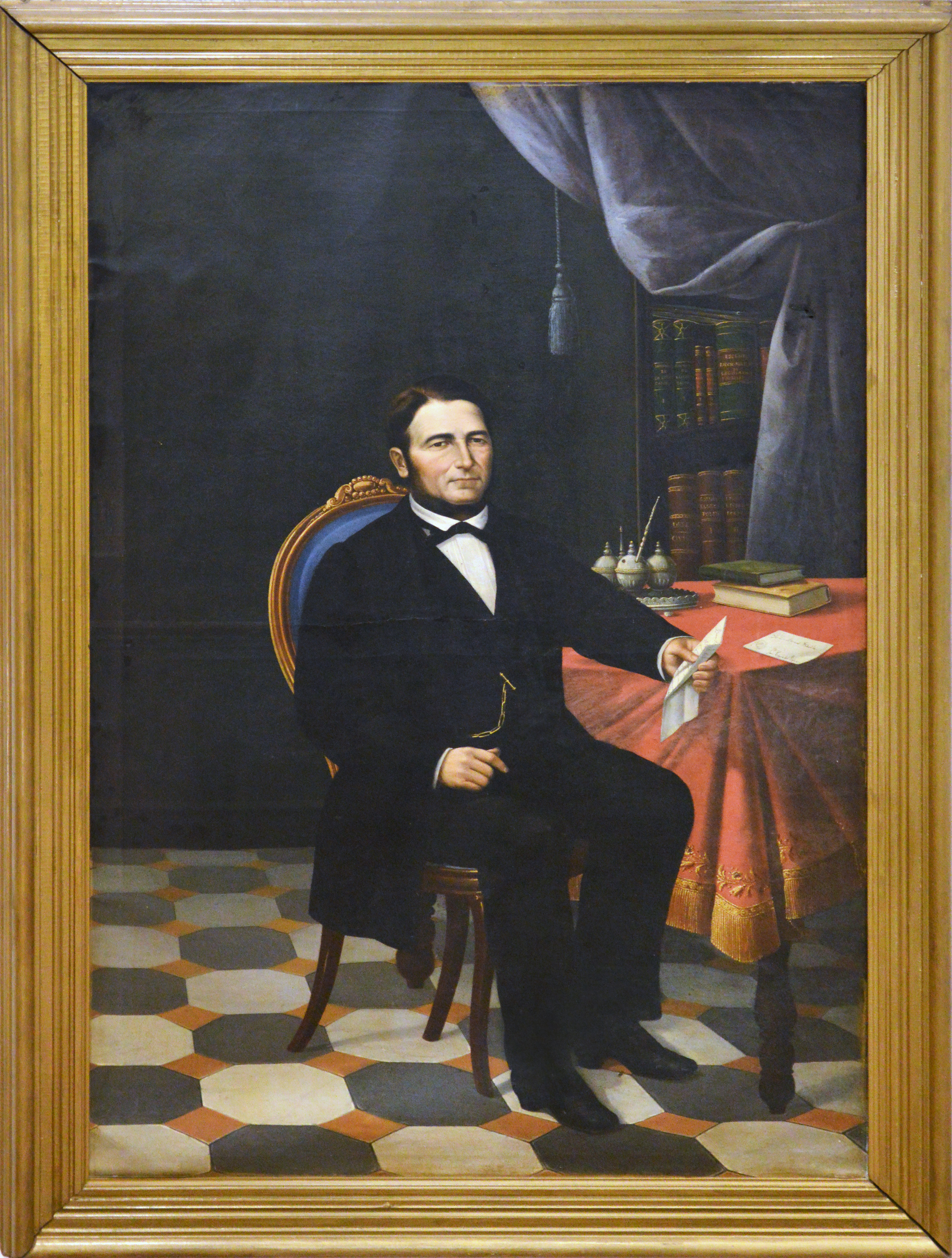
Manuel Taboada, oil painting by Felipe Taboada.

On July 1, 1854, Taboada informed the Minister of Public Instruction of the Confederation, Santiago Derqui, that the province had only the following schools: that of Fray Grande in the Dominican convent, that of Mrs. Inés Urrejola and two more in Loreto (of Suárez and Pereyra).

In order to improve this situation, several schools were subsidized during his mandate, such as that of Loreto, Sumamao and Villa La Punta. In 1856, he made Urrejola's school official and granted the teacher a monthly governmental stipend. Additionally, this policy of educational improvement in the province was accompanied by the creation of an elementary school in El Bracho, along with other projects to create schools in Salavina, Choya and Capital departments. The latter was planned according to Amédée Jacques' project presented to the legislature, although it could not be carried out due to lack of funds. During this period, military expenditures outpaced those in other areas of government.

==== Border defence ====
Due to the constant threats from the natives such as the Gran Chaco people at the provincial borders, a defense plan was agreed upon jointly with the government of the Córdoba Province. The reforms considerably improved the provincial army, which was placed under the command of the president of the legislature, Juan Francisco Borges, assisted by Antonino. Their main efforts were concentrated in the frontier of the Gran Chaco region, where forts and military colonies were founded, among them the current cities of Añatuya and Suncho Corral.

==== Exploration of the Salado River ====
Between 1855 and 1856, Manuel Taboada personally accompanied a series of exploratory expeditions to the Gran Chaco, delegating the provincial command to Borges in his absence. He was particularly interested in those oriented to demonstrate the navigability of the Salado River, due to his and Antonino's project to canalize the Salado for easier transport of products and goods to Buenos Aires, through the Paraná River. He cooperated with Thomas Page in his studies of the navigation of that waterway, with the firm Smith Hnos. & Cía. in 1856, and that same year he hired Esteban Rams y Rubert, who in November traversed the Salado River fully in 18 days. During his trip, he was accompanied by a contingent of troops commanded by general Antonino Taboada.

==== Economic policy ====
In the first years of administration, military expenses were higher due to the conflict with Tucumán. Between 1852 and 1853, the total annual budget was $12,542 and $31,122, respectively, of which $5,053 and $19,039 were allocated for the army, that is, 40.3% and 61% of the total budget, respectively.

In 1857 the province requested help from the national treasury to be able to cover the ordinary expenses of its budget, the government allocated it a sum of $20,000. In September of the same year, the patent tax was established in the province, abolishing the transit tax (prohibited by the Constitution of 1853) and the customs tax (which became national).

Under Taboada's government, the economic situation remained feudal-like. A lot of the land and estancias were controlled by wealthy families, who provided aid and protection to the labourers that worked for them. Among the most important products were wheat and corn, exported to Buenos Aires.

==== Organization of the provincial government ====
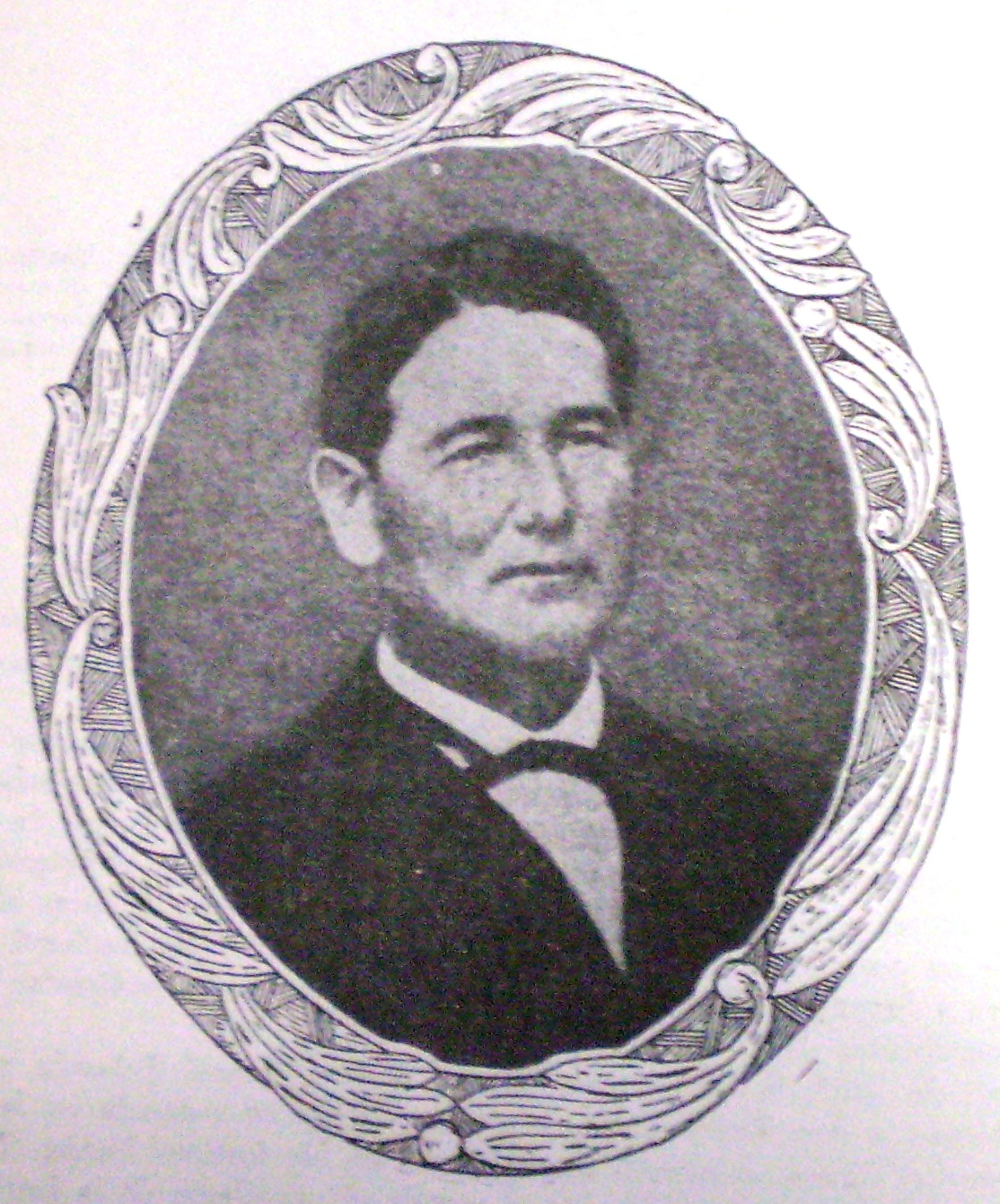
Manuel Taboada, date unknown.

During the first years of his mandate, Manuel Taboada faced the arduous task of organising the province of Santiago del Estero institutionally, in a context of instability marked by attacks from indigenous communities and hostilities from neighbouring provinces.

On 13 October 1854, Taboada called forth elections to determine representatives to a constitutional convention, scheduled to meet in December of the same year. It established electoral requirements, the delimitation of electoral sections and other formal aspects. However, the process was postponed for almost two years.

It was not until 19 May 1856 that a new constitutional election was called. In June, the governor appointed a commission to elaborate the preliminary draft of the provincial constitution, made up of Pedro Ramón Alcorta, Juan Francisco Borges, Luciano Gorostiaga, Domingo E. Navarro and Manuel Palacio. Once the commission was formed, the first provincial constitution was drafted, which was submitted to the National Congress and approved in August of the same year. Finally, on 25 May 1857, the new constitution was ratified province-wide.

On 23 November 1857, Manuel Taboada transferred power to Juan Francisco Borges, who was elected that same day by the House of Representatives as the first constitutional governor of Santiago del Estero for a two-year term. Borges, however, remained a political subordinate. He was on the verge of allying with Buenos Aires during the civil war of 1859, but the Confederation's victory at the Battle of Cepeda thwarted that possibility.

The following year, Santiago Derqui and Juan Esteban Pedernera won the provincial elections against Mariano Fragueiro and Antonino Taboada.

=== New conflicts ===
Subsequent to the elections, Pedro Ramón Alcorta was chosen as the new governor. However, being closely related to Manuel Taboada, the latter demanded a ministerial position in his government, a demand that Alcorta did not comply with. As a result of this, the ex-governor organized a coup against the newly elected provincial leader, who was forced to seek refuge in Tucumán. Alcorta requested an intervention of the national government in the province, which was led by the Tucumán governor Salustiano Zavalía, appointed by President Santiago Derqui. Zavalía managed to negotiate the recognition of Alcorta as legitimate governor by Manuel Taboada in exchange for the dismissal of the previous ministers in favor of Manuel as Minister of Government and Antonino as Commander of Arms.

Nevertheless, the conflict between the two individuals did not cease, and Alcorta asked the national government once again for help, requesting a new intervention and greater military aid. On 6 July 1861, the vice-president Juan Esteban Pedernera decreed a new federal intervention in Santiago del Estero Province, appointing the former governor of Catamarca Province, general Octaviano Navarro, as intervener. He fought José María del Campo in Tucumán with his military contingent and, after winning, headed towards Santiago del Estero, occupying the city in November 1861. However, his occupation was interrupted by the news of the victory of the centralist leader Bartolomé Mitre in the Battle of Pavón against the federalist government of Urquiza, which allowed the Taboada forces, after Navarro's retreat, to defeat the federalists of Gutiérrez in the Battle of Ceibal.

Pedro Gallo continued as governor of Santiago del Estero from 24 November 1861 until 24 April 1862, when his term ended. According to the House of Representatives, Manuel Taboada was appointed successor.

=== Third Term ===
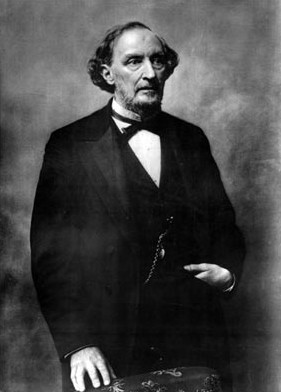
President Bartolomé Mitre, whom the Taboada family aided in suffocating the federalist rebellions in the north.

Manuel Taboada took office on June 8, 1862, beginning his third mandate and the first constitutional one. He appointed Amancio González Durán as General Minister, Martín Herrera as Chief of Police, Miguel Silvetti as Treasurer and general Antonino Taboada as Chief of Frontier and General Commander of Arms of the province. As Secretary, he appointed Eusebio Gómez.

==== Alliance with Mitre and military operations ====
Taboada ensured the election of a liberal government in the Catamarca Province, under the leadership of Ramón Rosa Correa. He also supported the policy of the governor Bartolomé Mitre in the northern provinces against the federalists. Due to this political and military pressure exerted by Taboada, among other allies of Mitre, he secured his appointment as president in 1862 with unanimous provincial support. In particular, the friendship forged with the new national leader, as well as the geographical situation and military power, made the Taboada brothers function as his representatives and main supporters in northern Argentina. Correspondingly, the national government granted a subsidy of $1000 per month to reinforce the provincial budget and military expenses.

At the beginning of 1863, Manuel Taboada delegated the provincial leadership to the president of the House of Representatives, to personally supervise the situation in the border region with the provinces of Catamarca and La Rioja. He feared that the forces of Felipe Varela and Severo Chumbita, both opponents of the unitarianism exercised by the new government, would invade Catamarca Province and overthrow governor Correa. For this purpose, he gathered, together with his brother Antonino, a military contingent of approximately 1,300 men. On 21 April 1863, the Battle of Huillapima took place against the vanguard of Felipe Varela, while the following day he fought against the forces of Colonel Carlos Ángel in the current Capayán Department during the Battle of Chumbicha. Both battles resulted in victory for the Taboada brothers.

On May 3, another confrontation took place in the Battle of Mal Paso between Taboada's soldiers and their allies from Tucumán and Catamarca, against the federal forces of governor Juan Bernardo Carrizo, consolidating the unitary control of the La Rioja Province, as well as the suffocation of the nucleus of federal resistance.

==== Canalization of the Salado River ====
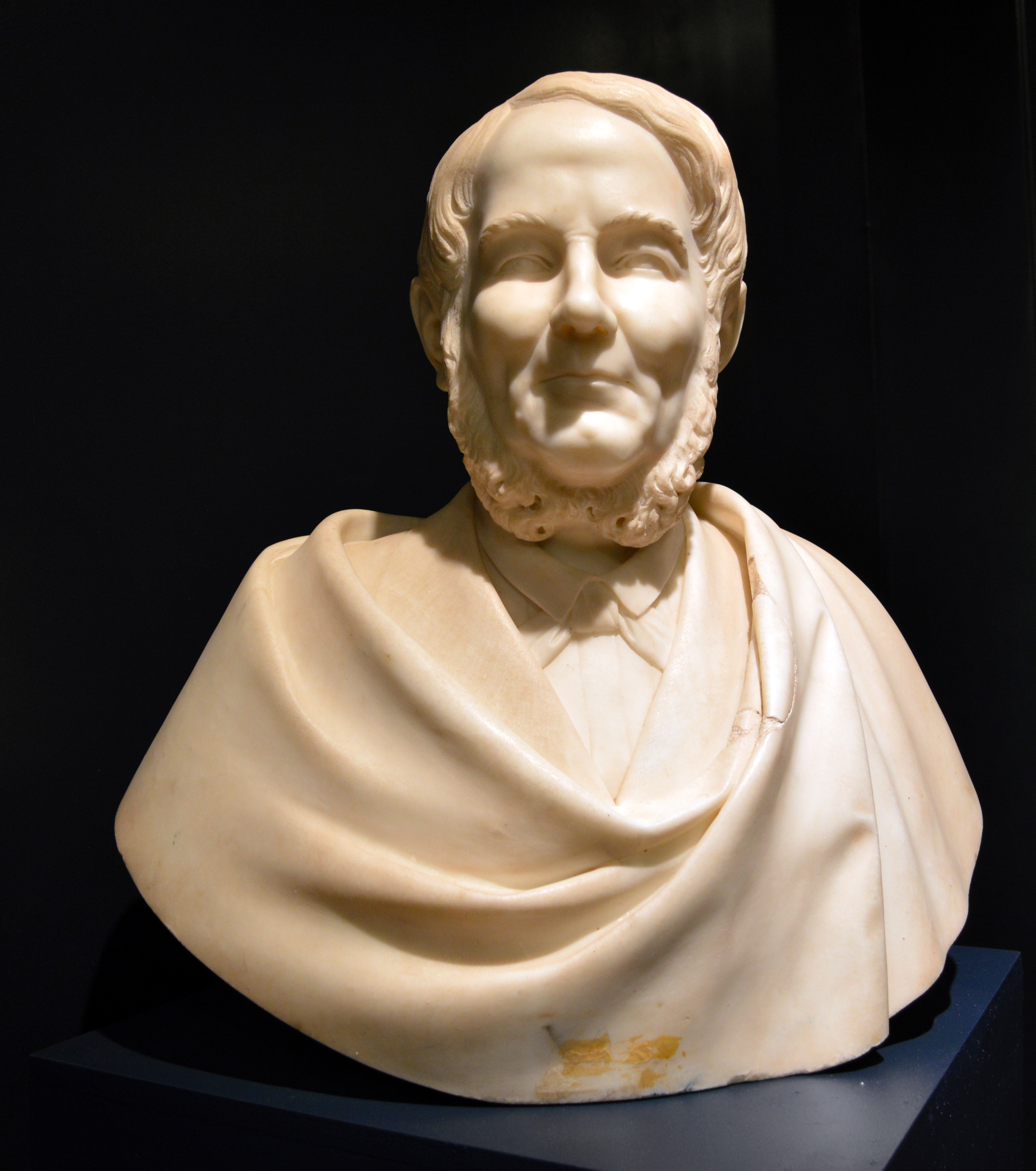
Bust of Manuel Taboada.

Based on the previous navigation projects of the Salado River, it was proposed to divert and channel it through its old course. Since the volatility of the region and the constant conflicts did not provide the necessary security for foreign investments, a commission was formed under the charge of Gregorio Santillán and Remigio Carol to collect the necessary funds. In total, $420 were raised.

On 1 December 1862, Esteban Rams y Rubert began a second expedition along the river, this time accompanied by the British Consul Thomas Joseph Hutchinson. The following year, on 25 December 1863, the works of canalization, clearing and cleaning of the old bed of the Salado River were inaugurated in Bracho Viejo, with a number of affluent individuals in attendance.

==== End of the mandate ====
In February 1864, the first reform to the Provincial Constitution of 1856 was ratified. Among other modifications, the governor's term of office was extended from two to three years. On 8 June 1864 Manuel Taboada left the government to his cousin Absalón Ibarra, who appointed him as one of his ministers.

He continued to participate in the war against the remaining federal units, among others, in the Battle of Pozo de Vargas, against Felipe Varela.

=== Fourth Term ===
In December 1867 he again assumed the position of governor.

He showed his support for the presidential candidacy of Rufino de Elizalde, endorsed by Mitre. However, only Santiago Province and Corrientes Provinceseconded him, while the majority supported Domingo Faustino Sarmiento. Consequently, the relationship with the new president remained sour, particularly after the decision by the national government to divert a railway project away from Santiago Province and towards Tucumán instead.

In December 1870, Manuel Taboada appointed Alejandro Montes as governor, but due to his decision to act independently of the Taboada family, he was deposed and succeeded by Luis Frías in June 1871.

Manuel Taboada died in Santiago del Estero on 7 September 1871. Four years later, his cousin Ibarra and his brother Antonino had to leave the province because of an armed revolt supported by President Nicolás Avellaneda.
