= Tafí Viejo Department =

Coordinates: 26.7344°S 65.2592°W

The department of Tafí Viejo is a department of the province of Tucumán (Argentina), created in 1907 by the reform of the provincial constitution, which divided the old department Tafí. Its head is the homonymous city. Bordered on the north by the department Trancas, east to Burruyacú and Cruz Alta, south of Capital, Yerba Buena and Lules, and west to Tafí del Valle.

== History ==
The lands of the department, had been given, in colonial times, to encomendero Melian Leguizamón y Guevara. In 1781, land purchase cited the name of Tafí Viejo by Catalina de Aráoz de Facundo Tejerina y Barrera a Juan Clemente Méndez y José Martín Méndez. Later, in 1782, would be transferred to Maria Juliana Alzogaray.

Until 1888, the town of San Miguel de Tucumán covered from Catamarca to Santiago del Estero. A new territorial division is then performed to form the departments of Tafí and Cruz Alta. In 1907, the Constitution of Tucumán recognized the municipal government and the department of Tafí gave rise to the town of Tafí Viejo.

== Economy ==
In the past the railway workshops located in the city of Tafí Viejo were the engine of the departmental economy. Currently, the economic activity of the department has its basis in the production of citrus, especially lemon, being in town two citrus plants of advanced technology, and several packing. Also other activities have developed, such as plastic industry.

== Population ==
The department Tafí Viejo has two major population centers: the city of Tafí Viejo and the municipality of Las Talitas, which grew up as a continuation of the capital city to the north. The city of Tafí Viejo is third in number of inhabitants in the province, second only to Concepción, and the capital, San Miguel de Tucumán.

== Gastronomy ==
The dining area has different features from other parts of Argentina derived in part from its origins as a railway junction (and therefore with little processing of their dishes) and workshop center. The recent growth of fruit production has led to the abundant incorporation of lemon juice or grated of it to many traditional dishes, being recognized in neighboring regions of his outstanding use.

== Seismic events ==
The seismicity of the area of Tucumán is frequent, low-intensity, and a seismic silence means severe earthquakes every 30 years.

- Earthquake of 1861: although this catastrophic geologic activity occurs since prehistoric times, the earthquake of March 20, 1861 with 12,000 deaths, marked an important milestone in the history of Argentine seismic events since it was the strongest recorded and documented in the country. From the same policy of successive governments of North and Cuyo have been taking extreme care and restricting codes construcción. And with the earthquake in San Juan on January 15, 1944, took state governments the enormous chronic severity of earthquakes in the region.
- Earthquake of 1931: magnitude of 6.3, which destroyed part of the buildings and opened numerous cracks in the zone.
