= Alderetes =

- City
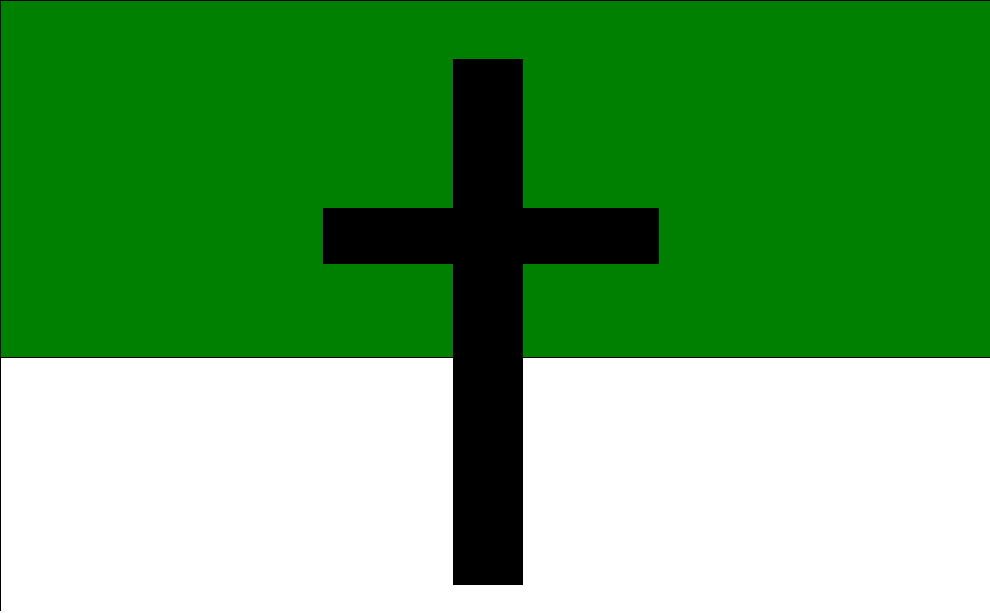
- Flag

- Location of Alderetes in Argentina
- Coordinates: 26°49′S 65°08′W
- Country: Argentina
- Province: Tucumán
- Department: Cruz Alta

Government
  - Intendant: Graciela Gutiérrez (PJ)

Population
  - Total: 38,466
- Demonym: alderetense
- Time zone: UTC−3 (ART)
- CPA base: ISO 3166-2:AR-T4178
- Dialing code: +54 0381
- Climate: Cwa

Alderetes is a city in the Cruz Alta Department, Tucumán Province, Argentina. It is bordered in the north by the Burruyacu Department, in the east by the "comunas rurales" of La Florida-Luisiana, Delfín Gallo and Colombres; in the south by the city of Banda del Río Salí (the Cruz Alta Department seat), and in the west by the Salí River.

A predominantly industrial spot, Alderetes was incorporated on September 1, 1987, as part of the San Miguel de Tucumán metropolitan area.

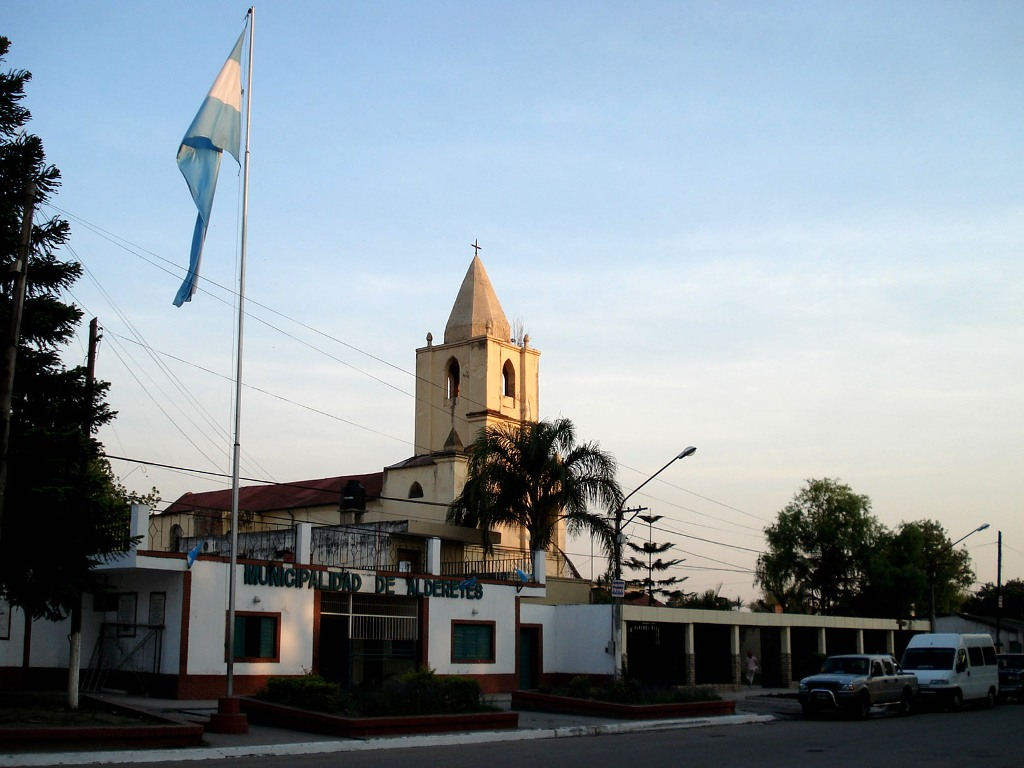
City Hall

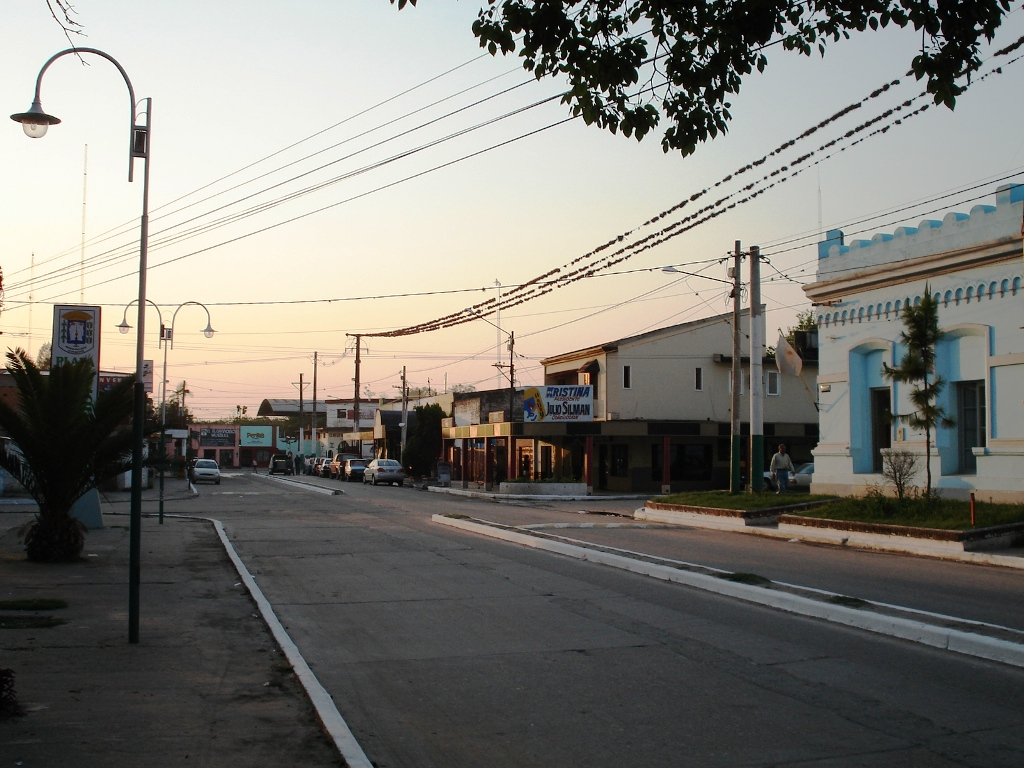
Urquiza Avenue
