= Capital Department =

Capital Department (Spanish: Departamento Capital) may refer to several departments of Argentine provinces:

- Capital Department, Catamarca (Catamarca Province)
- Capital Department, Corrientes (Corrientes Province)
- Capital Department, Córdoba (Córdoba Province)
- Capital Department, La Pampa (La Pampa Province)
- Capital Department, La Rioja (La Rioja Province)
- Capital Department, Mendoza (Mendoza Province)
- Capital Department, Misiones (Misiones Province)
- Capital Department, Salta (Salta Province), a department located in Salta Province, Argentina. It is the department of the provincial capital, the city of Salta, and the most populated one
- Capital Department, San Juan (San Juan Province), a department in the San Juan Province (Argentina). Where totally dominated a landscape completely urbanized with a high population density and containing the City of San Juan, focusing on all the power and financial administration of the province
- Capital Department, Santiago del Estero (Santiago del Estero Province)
- Capital Department, Tucumán (Tucumán Province), a department located in the center-north of the Tucumán Province, Argentina

== See also ==
- La Capital Department (disambiguation), the other utilized form
