= Trancas =

Trancas may refer to:

== Places ==
- Trancas, Argentina, a municipality in Tucumán Province, Argentina
- Trancas Department, a department located in the northern part of Tucumán Province, Argentina
- Las Trancas, a subdivision of Guararé District, Los Santos Province, Panama
- Trancas, a subdivision of the Agoura Hills-Malibu division in Los Angeles County, California
- Trancas Street, an arterial road connecting the Saint Helena Highway to the Silverado Trail in Napa County, California

== Other ==
- Trancas (album), a 1984 LP released by John Stewart
