= Ceja =

Ceja may refer to:

== People ==
Ceja is a Spanish-language surname. People with the surname include:

- Julio Ceja (disambiguation), various people
- MC Ceja (born 1978), Puerto Rican hip hop singer and composer also known as El Cejón
- Ramón Ceja Romero (born 1969), Mexican politician affiliated with the National Action Party
- Víctor Manuel Báez Ceja (born 1959), Mexican politician in the National Regeneration Movement (Morena) party
- Israel Madrigal Ceja (born 1975), Mexican politician from the Party of the Democratic Revolution
- Ramón Michel Navarro Ceja (Ramón Navarro; born 1998), professional Mexican footballer

== Other uses ==
- Ceja Canchal
- Ceja Vineyards, a family-owned winery in Napa founded by Mexican-American immigrants
- Ceja ray
- Conseil Européen des Jeunes Agriculteurs (CEJA), agricultural organization in Europe

== See also ==
- La Ceja (disambiguation)
- Cejas (disambiguation)
