= Cruz Alta Department =

Department of Argentina

Coordinates: 26°50′24″S 65°09′43″W

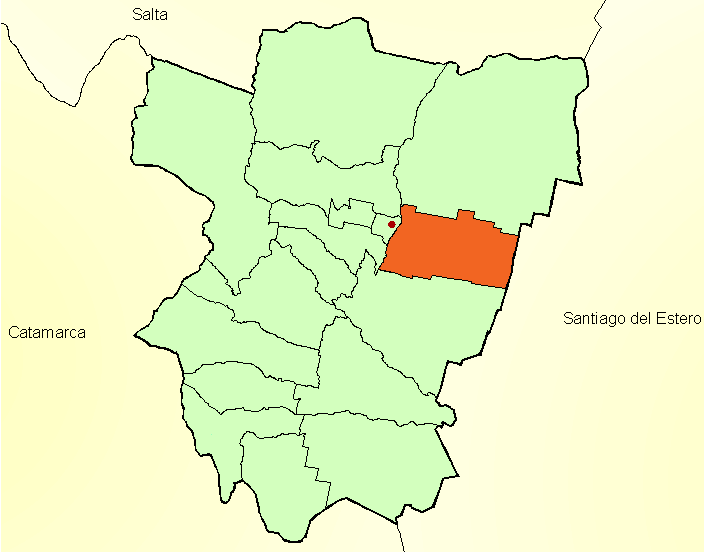

Cruz Alta Department is a department located in the east of the Tucumán Province, Argentina. In 2001 its population was 162,240 (2nd in the province) largely located in the Banda del Río Salí-Alderetes Area (northwest). The Department seat is the city of Banda del Río Salí.

== Geography ==
Plains occupy the department’s entire area (1,255 km²), stretching from the outskirts of the Greater San Miguel de Tucumán Area in the west to the Santiago del Estero Province border in the east. The Salí river forms its western boundary.

=== Adjacent districts ===
- Burruyacú Department – north
- Leales Department – south
- Lules, Capital and Tafí Viejo departments – west
- Santiago del Estero Province – east

=== Cities, towns and comunas rurales ===
- Alderetes
- Banda del Río Salí
- Colombres
- Delfín Gallo
- El Bracho y El Cevilar
- El Naranjito
- La Florida y Luisiana
- Las Cejas
- Los Bulacio y Los Villagra
- Los Pereyras
- Los Pérez
- Los Ralos
- Ranchillos y San Miguel
- San Andrés

== Transportation infrastructure ==
=== Major highways ===
- National Route 9
- Tucuman Province Routes: 302, 303, 304, 306, 320, 321.

=== Airports ===
- Benjamín Matienzo International Airport located in Cebil Pozo
