= Ranchillos y San Miguel =

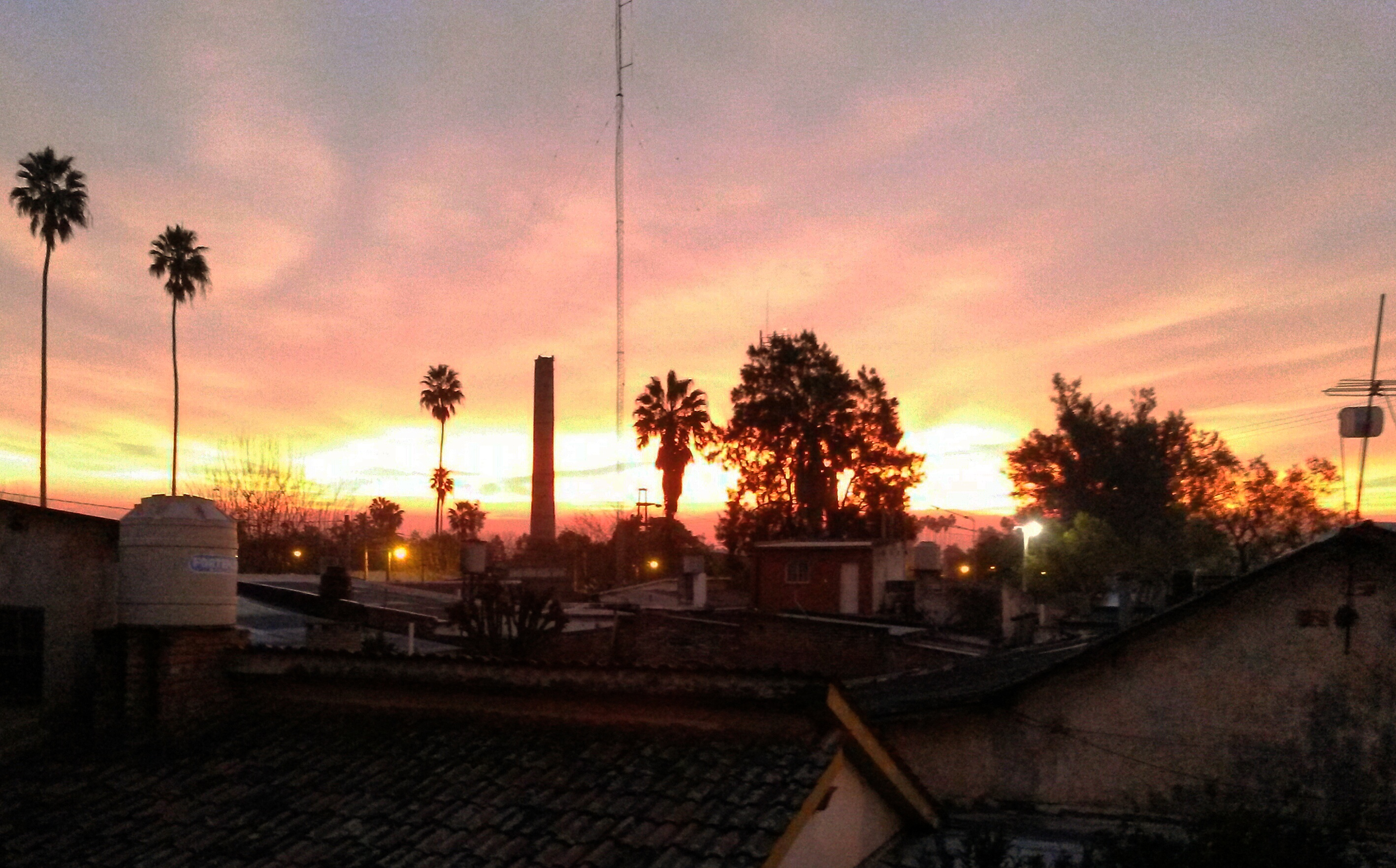
- Interactive map of Ranchillos y San Miguel
- Coordinates: 26°56′S 65°02′W
- Country: Argentina
- Province: Tucumán Province
- Time zone: UTC−3 (ART)

Ranchillos y San Miguel is a settlement in Cruz Alta Department, Tucumán Province in northern Argentina.
