= Cejas =

Cejas may refer to:

== People ==
- Agustín Cejas, Argentine footballer
- Mauro Cejas, Argentine footballer
- Maximiliano Cejas, Argentine footballer
- Paul L. Cejas, Cuban-born American businessman
- Sebastián Cejas, Argentine footballer

== Places ==
- Las Cejas, Argentine village
- Cejas, Comerío, Puerto Rico, a barrio in the municipality Comerío, in Puerto Rico

== See also ==
- Ceja (disambiguation)
