= Gobernador Garmendia =

- Town
- Location within Argentina
- Coordinates: 26.568889°S 64.556111°W
- Country: Argentina
- Province: Tucumán Province
- Department: Burruyacú Department

Population (2001)
  - Total: 2,353
- Time zone: UTC−3 (ART)

Gobernador Garmendia is a small town in Burruyacú Department in the Tucumán Province of Argentina. It is located on Provincial Road 336, and is 5 kilometres (3.1 mi) from the border with Santiago del Estero Province. It is named in honor of Pedro de Garmendia, appointed governor of Tucumán in 1840.

The town lies in an area where soybeans are grown. There is high unemployment and limited state jobs or private commercial activity.
