= Cruz Alta =

Cruz Alta may refer to:

- Cruz Alta Department, Tucumán Province, Argentina
- Cruz Alta, Rio Grande do Sul, Brazil
