= Yerba (disambiguation) =

Yerba or yerba mate is a South American holly plant.

It may also refer to:

- Yerba, West Virginia, a city in the U.S.
- Yerba buena, various aromatic plants

== See also ==
- Yerba Buena (disambiguation)
