= Capital Department, Tucumán =

Department in Tucumán Province, Argentina

Capital Department is a department located in the center-north of the Tucumán Province, Argentina. At the 2001 census, its population was 527,607 and its population density was 5,862/km^{2}. The city of San Miguel de Tucumán covers almost all 90 km^{2} of the department's area. It is the smallest department in area, but the most populated as well.

== Geography ==
The entire department lies on a plain presenting a gentle slope heading toward the Salí River located at the east end.

=== Adjacent departments ===
- Tafí Viejo Department – north
- Cruz Alta Department – east
- Lules Department – south and southwest
- Yerba Buena Department – west

== See also ==
- San Miguel de Tucumán
