= La Ceja =

La Ceja (Spanish: "The Eyebrow") may refer to:

- La Ceja, Antioquia, a town and municipality in Antioquia, Colombia
- La ceja (Spain), a landform of the Province of Albacete, Spain

== See also ==
- Ceja (disambiguation)
