= La Capital Department =

La Capital Department (Spanish: Departamento La Capital) may refer to some departments of Argentine provinces:

- La Capital Department, Santa Fe (Santa Fe Province)
- La Capital Department, San Luis (San Luis Province)

See also

- Capital Department (disambiguation), the most utilized form
