= Los Ralos, Tucumán =

Coordinates: 26°52′S 64°58′W

Los Ralos (Tucumán)
- Interactive map of Los Ralos (Tucumán)
- Country: Argentina
- Province: Tucumán Province
- Time zone: UTC−3 (ART)

Los Ralos is a settlement in Tucumán Province in northern Argentina.
