= Cebil Redondo =

Coordinates: 26°47′S 65°17′W

- Interactive map of Cebil Redondo
- Country: Argentina
- Province: Tucumán Province
- Time zone: UTC−3 (ART)
- Website: www.cebilredondo.gob.ar

Cebil Redondo is a settlement in Tucumán Province in northern Argentina.
