= Anca Juli =

Coordinates: 26°33′30″S 65°31′47″W

- Interactive map of Anca Juli
- Country: Argentina
- Province: Tucumán Province
- Time zone: UTC−3 (ART)

Anca Juli or Ancajuli is a small town in the Tucumán Province in the department of Tafi Viejo in northern Argentina.

== Location ==
Anca Juli is located 60 km northwest of the city of San Miguel de Tucumán.

== Toponym ==
There is a Cacán etymology attached to the meaning of Anca Juli which may be translated in that language as birthplace of eagles.

== Geography ==
It is surrounded by high mountains up to 5000 m on the eastern slopes of the Calchaquíes Summits. The small village is characterized by its large river (good for trout fishing) and varied wildlife that roams the river.
