= Las Cejas =

Coordinates: 26°53′S 64°44′W

- Interactive map of Las Cejas
- Country: Argentina
- Province: Tucumán Province
- Time zone: UTC−3 (ART)

Las Cejas is a settlement in Cruz Alta Department, Tucumán Province in northern Argentina.
