= Amédée Jacques =

French-Argentine pedagogue and philosopher

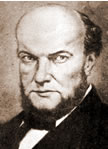
Amédée Jacques

Amédée Jacques (Paris, 4 July 1813 - Buenos Aires, 13 October 1865), often known as Amadeo, was a French-Argentine pedagogue and philosopher and one of the most prestigious educators of his time.

== Biography ==
Jacques was the son of Marie Gérard and Nicolas Jacques, a Parisian painter of miniatures. He studied at the Lycée Condorcet and the École Normale Supérieure. He received his doctorate in letters from the Sorbonne at the age of twenty-four, and soon afterwards received a degree in natural sciences. He worked as a docent at the École Normale Supérieure and the Lycée Louis-le-Grand.

He collaborated on Adolphe Frank's Dictionnaire des sciences philosophiques in 1843, and also worked in publishing. He wrote the sections Introduction and Psychologie of Jules Simon and Émile Saisset's Manuel de philosophie à l'usage des collèges.

Jacques clashed with the Minister of Public Education, Victor Cousin, with whom he, Simon, and Saisset differed politically. In 1847, the three professors founded a journal of opinion, Liberté de penser, although Simon soon resigned due to Jacques's collectivist sympathies.

Jacques emigrated to Montevideo, bringing with him a recommendation from Alexander von Humboldt. He intended originally to reorganize the Universidad Mayor, but his initiatives did not win support. Attracted to Entre Ríos by the progressive culture fostered there by its governor Justo José de Urquiza, Jacques decided to move to Paraná. Here he sold his scientific instruments to the local college and acquired supplies for daguerreotypy and surveying, by which he hoped to earn a living.

Jacques moved to Buenos Aires to give free physics lectures, but these were not popular. With Alfredo Cosson, he traveled to Rosario and Entre Rios to produce daguerreotypes. In 1854, now-president Urquiza appointed him director of the land registry. He lived briefly in Córdoba and spent several years in Santiago del Estero, where he was married. He became the official surveyor of the province and conducted an expedition down the Salado River into Chaco. He also continued to work as a baker, and even thought of becoming a sugarcane planter. An account of his expedition, Excursion au Rio Salado et dans le Chaco, was published in Paris in 1857. In it, he recalled the events he had witnessed, including descriptions of the scenery and the customs of local people.

He later moved to Tucumán, where he ran a bakery and worked as a surveyor and photographer, among many other activities, until in 1858 the provincial government appointed him director of the Colegio de San Miguel, based in the old cloisters of La Merced Church, whose professors had moved to Buenos Aires and left it unstaffed. Here he developed further his plan to reform the systems and methodologies of pedagogy. Jacques established the first institute of higher learning in Tucumán, which was praised by Hermann Burmeister and others, which would educate many distinguished Tucumanians such as Delfín Gallo and Sisto Terán. However, military and political disorder led Jacques to resign in 1860. In the Tucumanian newspapers El Eco del Norte and El Liberal, he published important articles about his educational principles.

He then relocated to Buenos Aires, where Marcos Paz, at that time vice president of the republic, designated him chief professor of the Colegio Nacional de Buenos Aires, and following the death of Eusebio Agüero, president of the college. His tenure at the Colegio was recorded by Miguel Cané in his novel Juvenilia, and in Memoria, a pedagogic memoir left incomplete by Jacques's sudden death. At the Colegio he exercised his impulse to transform, introducing new scientific ideas from Europe into the curriculum, and redesigning the curriculum as a means of preparing students to "learn everything".

Along with Juan María Gutiérrez he prepared the Plan de Instrucción Pública (Plan of Public Instruction), which had a major influence on education in Argentina. He also taught chemistry and experimental physics, and wrote Curso de Filosofía, published in France, which formed the basis for the teaching of philosophy in Argentina.

He died suddenly in 1865 in Buenos Aires, Argentina.
