= Julio Ceja =

Julio Ceja may refer to:

- Julio Ceja (boxer) (born 1992), Mexican boxer
- Julio Ceja (footballer) (born 1986), Mexican footballer
