= Burruyacú =

Coordinates: 26°30′S 64°45′W

- Interactive map of Burruyacú
- Country: Argentina
- Province: Tucumán Province

Government
  - Intendant: Jorge Leal (PJ)
- Time zone: UTC−3 (ART)

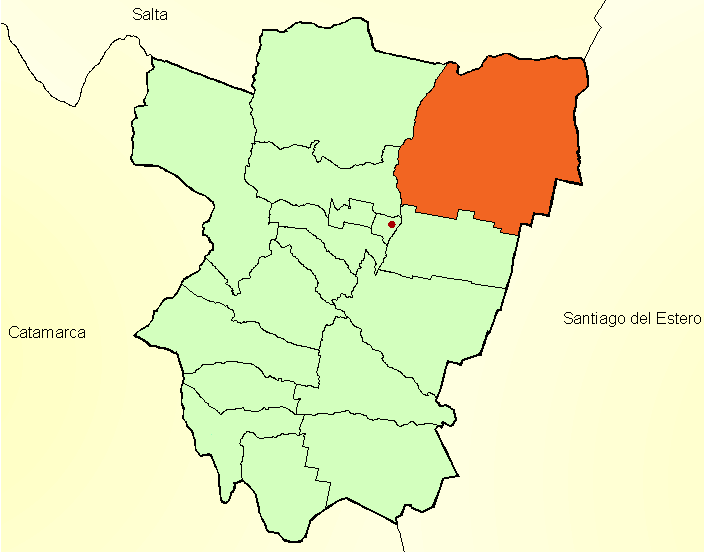

Burruyacú is a settlement in Tucumán Province, Argentina. It is the seat of Burruyacú Department.
