= Burruyacú Department =

Coordinates: 26.5003°S 64.7419°W

Burruyacú Department is a department located in the northwest of the Tucumán Province, Argentina. According to the 2001 census, its population was 32,936. The department seat is the town of Burruyacú.

== Geography ==
The department has a total area of 3,605 km^{2}, making it the largest department in the province. It has a mountainous west formed by the Sierra de Medinas. East of these mountains is a fertile and sparsely populated plain where ranching and agriculture dominate the land use.

=== Adjacent districts ===
- Salta Province – north
- Santiago del Estero Province – east
- Cruz Alta Department – south
- Trancas Department and Tafí Viejo Department – west

=== Towns and comunas rurales ===
- Benjamín Aráoz y El Tajamar
- Burruyacú
- El Chañar
- El Naranjo y El Sunchal
- El Puestito
- El Timbó
- Gobernador Garmendia
- La Ramada y La Cruz
- Piedrabuena
- 7 de abril
- Tala Pozo
- Villa Padre Monti

== Transportation infrastructure ==
=== Major highways ===
- National Route 34
- Tucumán Province Route 304
- Tucumán Province Route 305
- Tucuman Province Route 310
- Tucuman Province Route 317
- Tucuman Province Route 321
- Tucuman Province Route 336
