= Banda del Río Salí =

- City
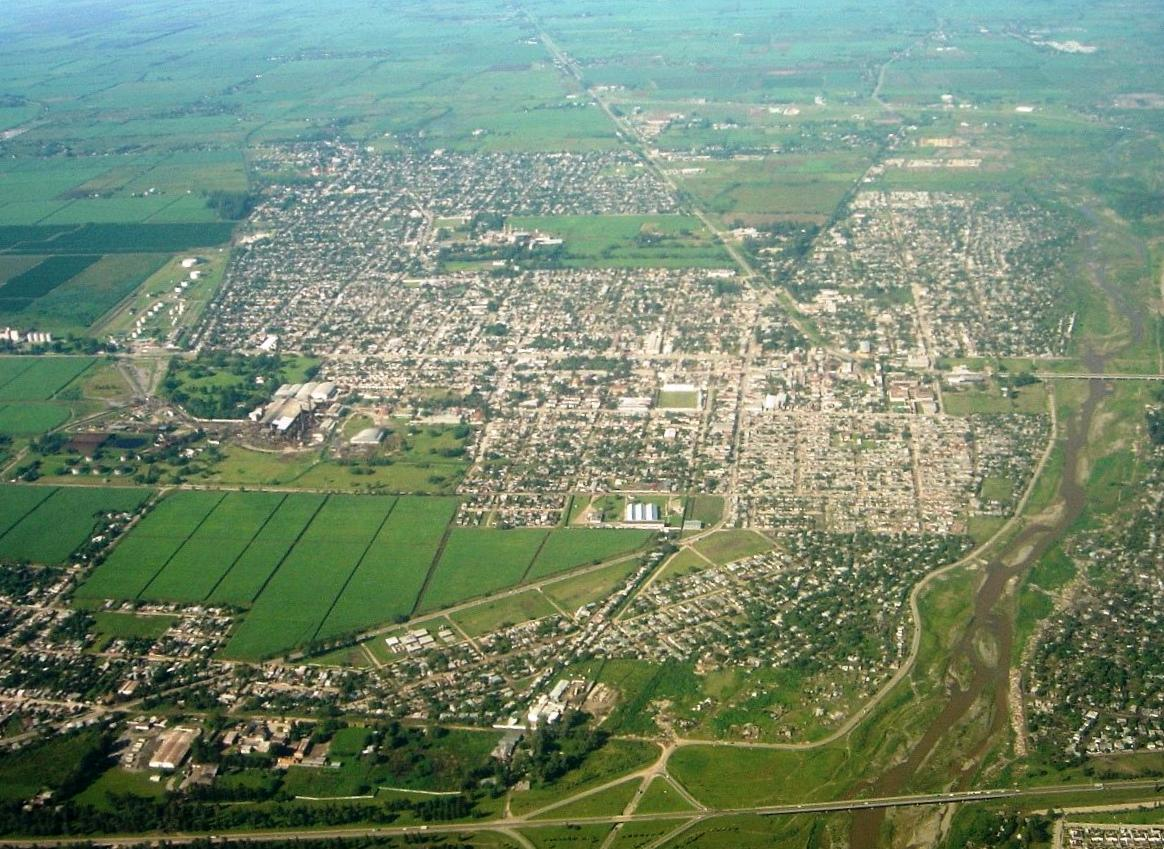
- View of Banda del Rio Salí

- Location of Banda del Río Salí in Argentina
- Coordinates: 26°51′S 65°10′W
- Country: Argentina
- Province: Tucumán
- Department: Cruz Alta

Government
  - Intendant: Gonzalo Monteros (PJ)
- Elevation: 425 m (1,394 ft)

Population (2010 census)
  - Total: 63,226
- Time zone: UTC−3 (ART)
- CPA base: T4146

Banda del Río Salí is a city in the Tucumán Province, Argentina. It is the department seat and the largest and most populated city in the Cruz Alta Department. The 2010 Census counted a population of 63,226.

The city is part of the Greater San Miguel de Tucumán area and its largest employer is the Concepción Sugar Mill, the only remaining such facility after Pres. Juan Carlos Onganía had the state-owned Lastenia Mill closed in 1966.
