= Trancas, Argentina =

Trancas
- Location in Argentina
- Coordinates: 26.217222°S 65.283056°W
- Country: Argentina
- Province: Tucumán Province
- Department: Trancas Department

Government
  - Intendant: Antonio Moreno (PJ)

Population (2001)
  - Total: 3,391
- Time zone: UTC−3 (ART)

Trancas is a municipality in Tucumán Province, Argentina, administrative seat of Trancas Department. The town is located in a large valley between high mountains and hills covered with forest and jungle. Trancas was a strategic point for the defense of the North and witnessed important events during the struggle for Argentina's independence.

== History ==
- 1600, A settlement is started at the place called "Pozo del Pescado" ("Fish Pit"), protected by a fort.
- 1700. About this time the Jesuits build the first church of the village of Trancas, a stage on the journey from Tucumán to Salta Province.
- 1763. the population moves 3 kilometres (1.9 mi) south to land donated by José Torino.
- 1816. August 7, General Manuel Belgrano resumes command of the Northern Army in Trancas after relieving José Rondeau.
- 1820. Colonel Bernabé Aráoz becomes President of the "Republic of Tucumán".
- 1824. Bernabé Aráoz is shot against the south wall of the church.
- 1826. The town is destroyed by the earthquake of 1826.
- 1827. Reconstruction begins on the old foundations.
- 1885. The railroad arrives. Neighbors begin to petition the provincial authorities to move the town, as the land on which it stood was low-lying, allowing the proliferation of diseases.
- 1906. A decree establishes the village called "Trancas Station" (on land donated by the Wolf family) and which then came to be called Trancas.

== Church ==
The Church of the Sacred Heart (Iglesia del Sagrado Corazón) was declared a National Monument in 1957. It is built in an austere postcolonial style, with a steeple, nave and chapel of souls. The flat façade unifies the nave with the belfry. The two overlapping gables lend originality. The interior is simple, with a choir as a transition area at the entrance, and behind the chapel of souls. It is built with adobe walls, plastered and whitewashed. The roof is of shingles over wood trusses. Inside it preserves a heritage of religious art: the image of the patron saint San Joaquin, (perhaps from a workshop in Upper Peru) a St. Joseph and a Nazarene. The sculptor Lola Mora was baptized here.
