= Yerba Buena =

Yerba buena is a Spanish term meaning "good herb". It may refer to

== Plants ==
- Yerba buena, a number of aromatic plants

== Places ==
- Yerba Buena, California, a former town that became San Francisco, California, U.S.
- Yerba Buena, Tucumán, the capital of the Yerba Buena Department in the province of Tucumán, Argentina
  - Yerba Buena Department, a department of Tucumán Province, Argentina consisting of the city of Yerba Buena and two towns
- Yerba Buena Island, an island in the San Francisco Bay
- Yerbas Buenas, a Chilean town and commune in Linares Province, Maule Region

== Organizations ==
- Yerba Buena Center for the Arts, a contemporary arts and convention center in San Francisco
- Yerba Buena High School, a high school in San Jose, California

== Media ==
- Yerba Buena (band), a fusion band based in New York City
- Yerba Buena Jazz Band, a Dixieland revival band founded by Lu Watters
- Yerba Buena (video game), a 2026 puzzle platformer video game
