= Ceja Vineyards =

Coordinates: 38.235586°N 122.314545°W

- Location: Napa, California, USA
- Appellation: Los Carneros AVA
- Founded: 1999
- First vintage: 2001
- Key people: Amelia Moran Ceja, President; Armando Ceja, Winemaker and Viticulturist
- Cases/yr: 7000
- Known for: Carneros Pinot noir
- Varietals: Chardonnay, Dulce Beso - Late Harvest White Wine, Cabernet Sauvignon, Merlot, Pinot noir, Sauvignon blanc, Syrah
- Distribution: national
- Website: http://www.cejavineyards.com

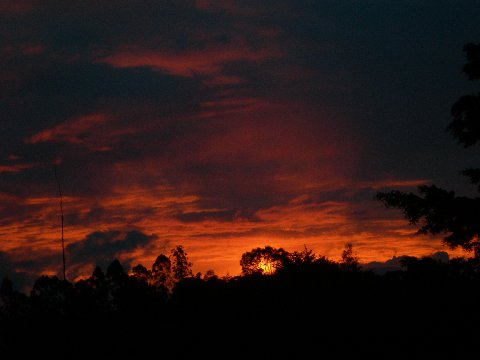
The gate of Ceja Vineyards

Ceja Vineyards is a family-owned winery in Napa founded by Mexican-American immigrants. The Ceja family have been growers in the Napa and Sonoma valleys in California for three generations. The wine production company was founded in 1999 and focuses on premium wines. The principals are; Amelia Moran Ceja, President; Martha Ceja, Vice President; Pedro Ceja, Secretary; and Armando Ceja, Treasurer. As of 2008 production is around 10,000 cases per year.

== Family history ==
Amelia Morán Ceja was born in Las Flores, Jalisco, an agricultural village in Mexico. At 12, she moved with her family to the Napa Valley AVA in California. Her father was a mechanic at a local vineyard management company and her mother was a farm worker there. During the summers and Christmas break, Amelia worked there as well. Amelia’s high school education was split between Mexico and the United States. She spent two years in a boarding school in Aguascalientes. Amelia attended UC San Diego where she majored in History and Literature. Amelia and her husband, Pedro Ceja, met at the age of twelve while picking grapes with their families. They married in 1980.. She has also been called "the first Mexican American president of a wine production company in the history of the wine industry".

Brothers Pedro and Armando Ceja were born in Aguililla, Michoacán. Their father, Pablo Ceja, spent many years working in the Bracero, and eventually immigrated to the United States with his wife, Juanita Castañeda Ceja, and their family in 1967. The family settled in St. Helena in the Napa Valley, and on weekends the children worked with their parents in the vineyards. Armando Ceja began his winegrowing career at the age of seven, and he made his first Cabernet Sauvignon barrel at eighteen. After high school, he studied oenology and viticulture at UC Davis, and is now Vineyard Manager and Head Winemaker at Ceja Vineyards. Pedro Ceja worked as an engineer for ThermoFinnegan before returning to oenology. In 1983, Pedro and Amelia partnered with Armando, Pablo, and Juanita to buy their first parcel of land in Carneros, California, thus founding Ceja Vineyards.

The family tradition continues with Amelia and Pedro's children. Their daughter, Dalia Ceja, is the Brand Marketing Manager and their son, Ariel Ceja, is General Manager at Ceja Vineyards.

== Wine history ==
The Ceja family bought its first 15 acres (61,000 m^{2}) of vineyards in 1983.
