= Yerba Buena Department =

Coordinates: 26°49′S 65°19′W

Yerba Buena is a department of Tucumán Province, Argentina.

The department comprises the city of Yerba Buena and two "comunas rurales" (rural communities): Cebil Redondo and San Javier, with a joint population of 63,707 (2001). Lying at the feet of the Aconquija Range, it is located next to San Miguel de Tucumán on the east, Tafi Viejo on the north and northwest, and Lules on the south and southwest.

== See also ==
- Yerba Buena (disambiguation)
