= Trancas Department =

Trancas
- Department
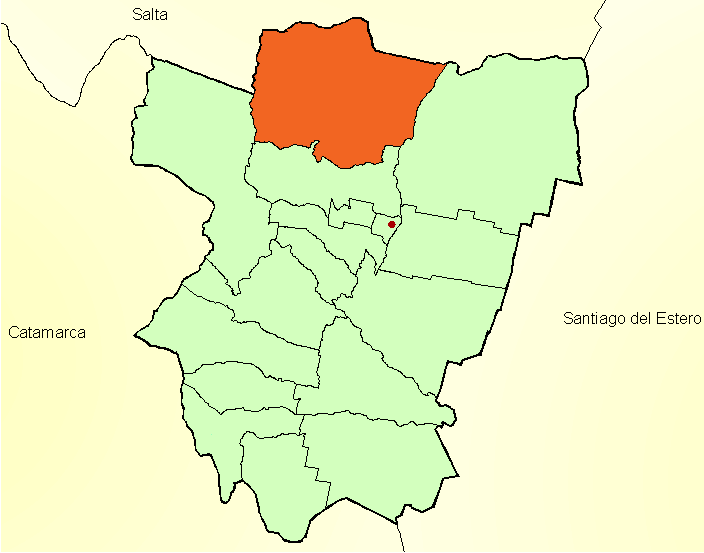
- Location of Trancas in Tucumán
- Coordinates: 26.230833°S 65.283333°W
- Country: Argentina
- Province: Tucumán

Area
  - Total: 2,862 km^{2} (1,105 sq mi)

Population (2010)
  - Total: 17,541
  - Density: 6.129/km^{2} (15.87/sq mi)
- Time zone: UTC−3 (ART)

Trancas is a department located in the northern part of Tucumán Province, Argentina. It is bounded to the west and north by Salta Province, on the east by the Department of Burruyacú, to the south by the Department of Tafi Viejo and to the southwest by the Department of Tafí del Valle. The headquarters is the town of Trancas.

== Population ==
According to the 2010 Census, 17,541 people lived in the apartment people. This number made it the third least populated department of the province, after Barns and Tafi del Valle.
