= Delfín Gallo =

Argentine politician and journalist (1845–1889)

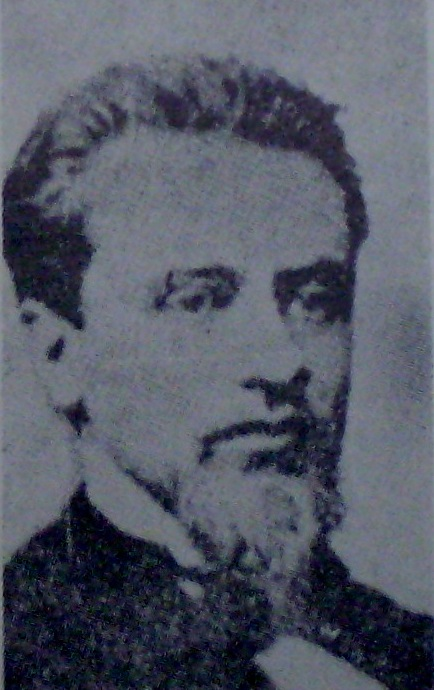

National Deputy
- In office 1884–1888
- In office 1872–1876
- Constituency: Tucumán
- In office 1876–1884
- Constituency: Buenos Aires

Personal details
- Born: 25 November 1845 San Miguel de Tucumán, Argentina
- Died: 8 December 1889 (aged 44) Buenos Aires, Argentina
- Education: Colegio San Miguel
- Occupation: Politician; journalist

Delfín Gallo (25 November 1845 – 8 December 1889) was an Argentine politician and journalist.

== Early life ==
He was born in San Miguel de Tucumán to a family with connections to the Tucumán oligarchy, and studied under Amédée Jacques at the Colegio San Miguel.

== Career ==
In 1867, he received a license to practice law in Buenos Aires. He later pursued a career in journalism in publications such as La Prensa, El Nacional, and SudAmérica, which he founded along with his brother in law Carlos Pellegrini and Lucio V. López.

He represented Tucumán as a national deputy from 1872 to 1876 and from 1884 to 1888; between 1876 and 1884, he represented Buenos Aires. A great parliamentary orator, he is remembered especially for his vigorous condemnation of the overthrow of Tucumanian governor Juan Posse in 1887. He served as undersecretary of justice and public education during the administration of Nicolás Avellaneda. He sat on the board of directors of the Western and Pacific Railroads, and presided over the National Real-estate Bank.

On 1 September 1889, during the run-up to the Revolution of the Park, Gallo spoke at the great meeting of the Jardín Florida, which gave rise to the Civic Youth Union.

== Death ==
He died on 8 December 1889 in Buenos Aires.
