= Capital Department, Santiago del Estero =

Capital Department
- Department
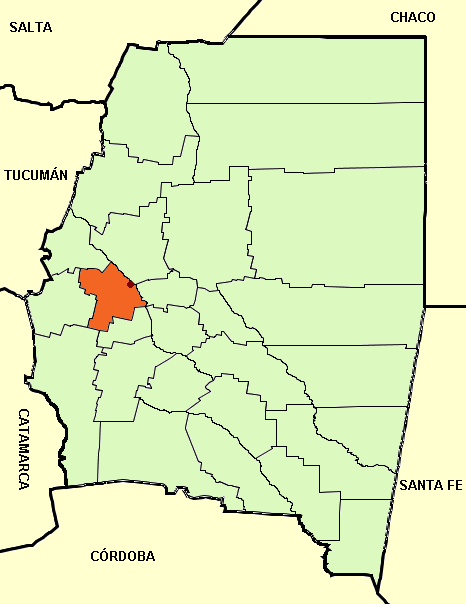
- Location of Capital Department within Santiago del Estero Province
- Coordinates (Santiago del Estero): 27°48′00″S 64°16′00″W
- Country: Argentina
- Province: Santiago del Estero
- Head town: Santiago del Estero

Area
  - Total: 2,116 km^{2} (817 sq mi)

Population (2010)
  - Total: 267,125
  - Density: 126.2/km^{2} (327.0/sq mi)
- Time zone: UTC-3 (ART)

Capital Department (Spanish: Departamento Capital) is a department of Argentina in Santiago del Estero Province. The capital city of the department is situated in Santiago del Estero.
