= Lules Department =

Coordinates: 26°55′19″S 65°20′16″W

Lules
- Department
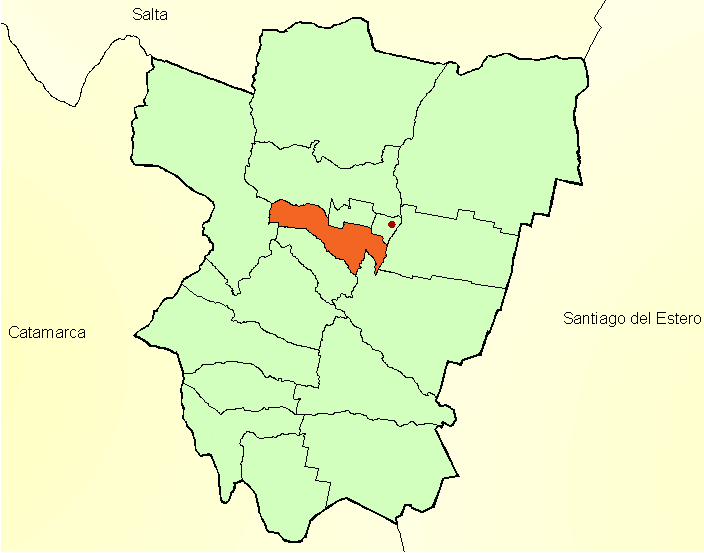
- Location of Lules Department in Tucumán Province.
- Country: Argentina
- Province: Tucumán

Area
  - Total: 540 km^{2} (210 sq mi)

Population
  - Total: 57,235

Lules Department is a department in Tucumán Province, Argentina. It has a population of 57,235 (2001) and an area of 540 km². The seat of the department is in Lules.

== Municipalities and communes ==
- El Manantial
- Lules
- San Felipe y Santa Bárbara
- San Pablo y Villa Nougués
