= Tucumán Province =

Province of Argentina

Tucumán
- Province
- Province of Tucumán; Provincia de Tucumán (Spanish)
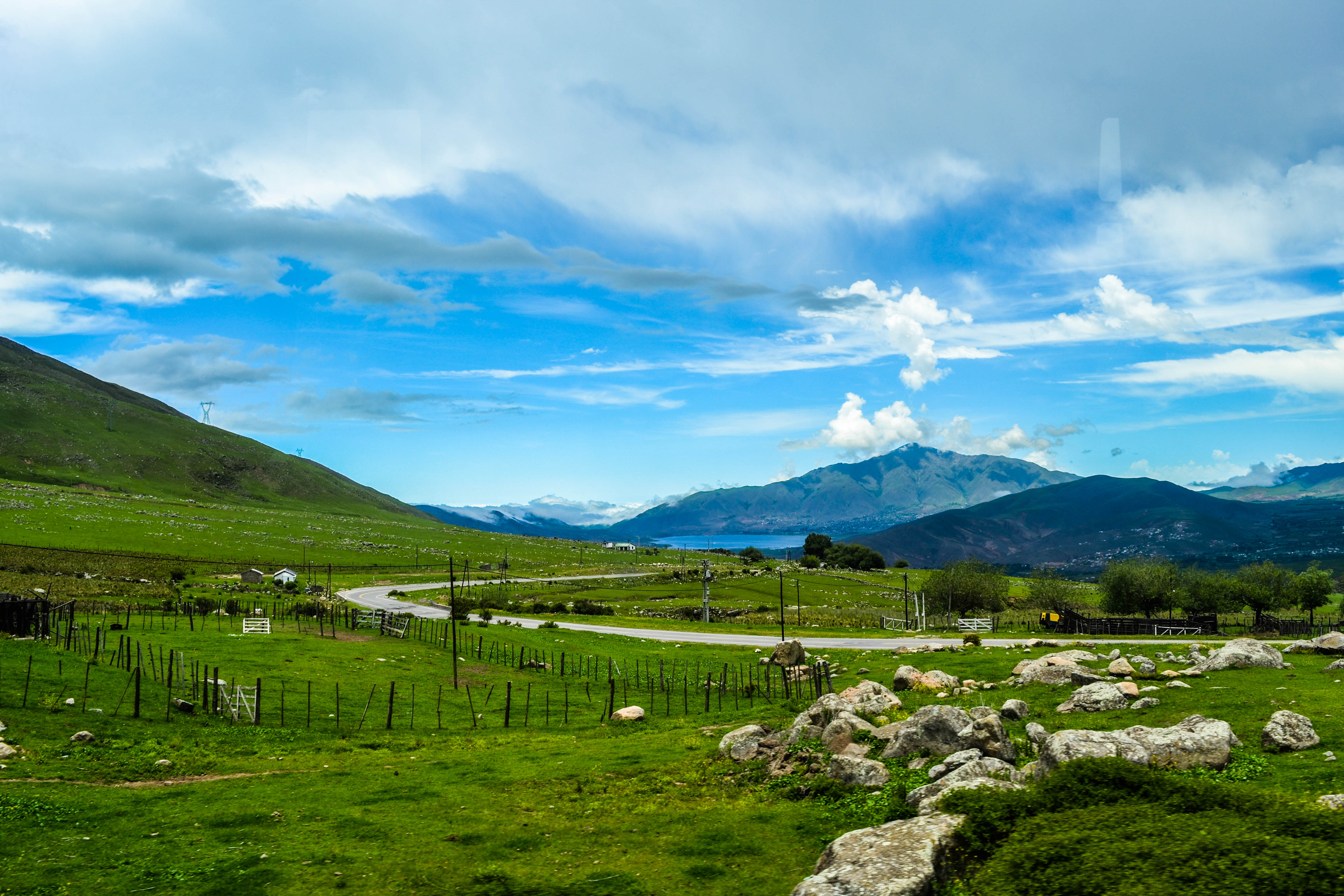
- The Tafí Valley

- Flag Coat of arms
- Nickname: The Garden of the Republic
- Location of Tucumán within Argentina
- Coordinates: 26.94°S 65.34°W
- Country: Argentina
- Capital: San Miguel de Tucumán
- Subdivisions: List: Departments: 17; Municipalities and rural communes: 112

Government
  - Governor: Osvaldo Jaldo (PJ)
  - Vice Governor: Miguel Ángel Acevedo (PJ)
  - Legislature: 49
  - National Deputies: 9 (List): Mariano Campero; Gerardo Huesen; Gladys Medina; Elia Fernández de Mansilla; Carlos Aníbal Cisneros; Agustín Fernández; Pablo Yedlin; Paula Omodeo; Roberto Antonio Sánchez
  - National Senators: 3 (List): Beatriz Ávila; Sandra Mariela Mendoza; Juan Manzur

Area Ranked 22nd
  - Total: 22,524 km^{2} (8,697 sq mi)

Population (2022 census)
  - Total: 1,731,820
  - Rank: 6th
  - Density: 76.888/km^{2} (199.14/sq mi)
- Demonym: tucumano

GDP
  - Total: peso 523 billion (US$11.2 billion) (2019)
- Time zone: UTC−3 (ART)
- ISO 3166 code: AR-T
- HDI (2021): 0.841 very high (13th)
- Website: www.tucuman.gov.ar

Tucumán (Spanish pronunciation: [tukuˈman]) is the most densely populated, and the second-smallest by land area, of the provinces of Argentina.

Located in the northwest of the country, the province has the capital of San Miguel de Tucumán, often shortened to Tucumán. Neighboring provinces are, clockwise from the north: Salta, Santiago del Estero and Catamarca. It is nicknamed El Jardín de la República (The Garden of the Republic), as it is a highly productive agricultural area.

== Etymology ==
The word Tucumán probably originated from the Quechua languages. It may represent a deformation of the term Yucumán, which denotes the "place of origin of several rivers". It can also be a deformation of the word Tucma, which means "the end of things". Before Spanish colonization, the region lay in the outer limits of the Inca Empire.

== History ==
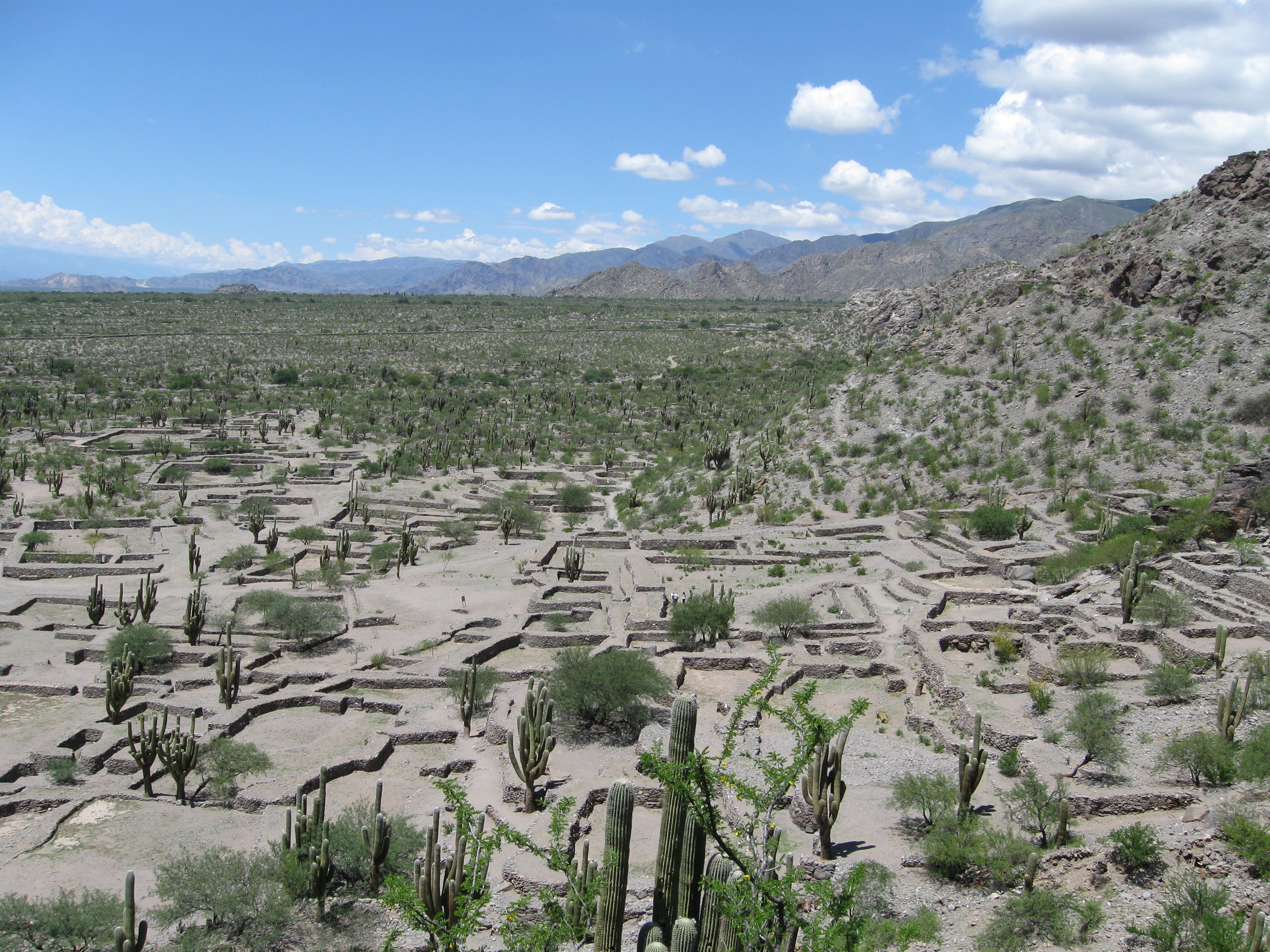
Ruins of the Quilmes civilization, a Diaguita culture

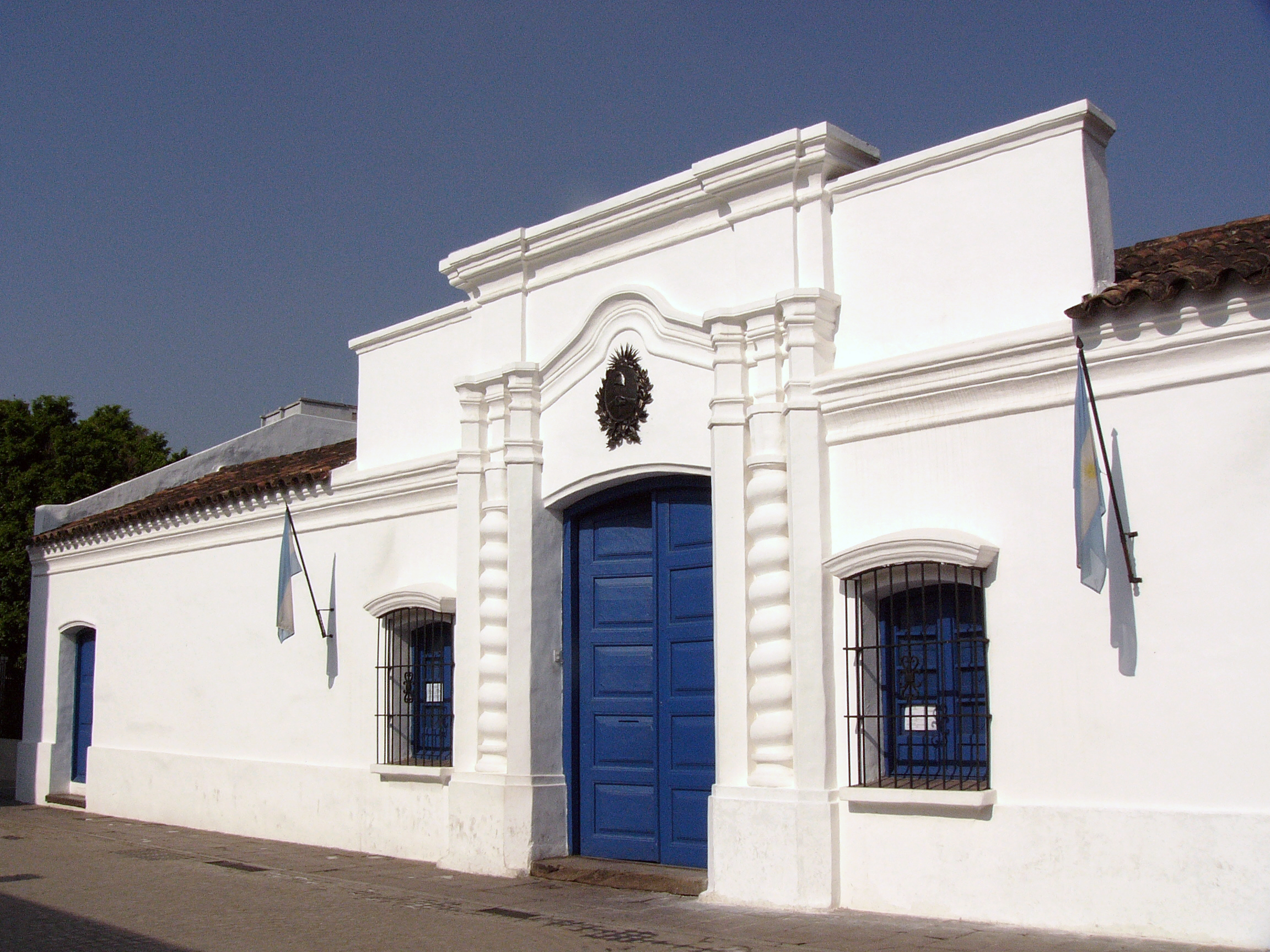
The Tucumán House, where Argentine independence was signed in 1816

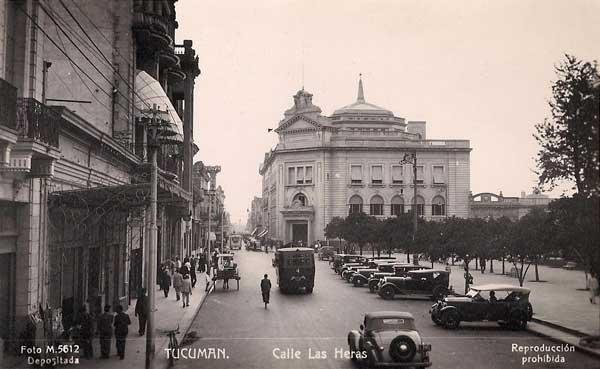
Downtown Tucumán in the 1920s

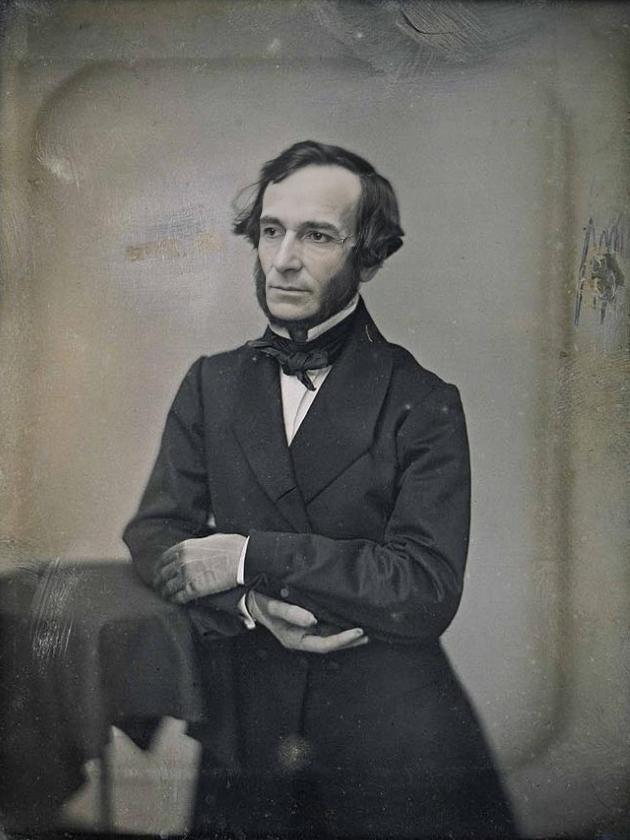
Juan Bautista Alberdi was a political theorist and diplomat.

Before the Spanish colonization, this land was inhabited by the Diaguitas and Tonocotes.

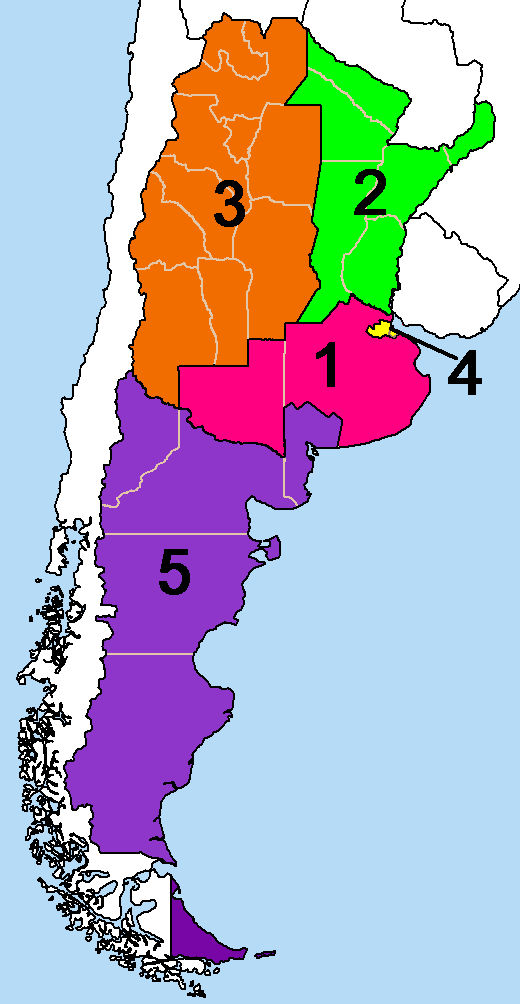
Operativo Independencia: Military zones of Argentina, 1975-1983 (Tucumán Province is in zone 3, the smallest province in the middle).

In 1535, Diego de Almagro explored the Argentine Northwest, including Tucumán. In 1549 the Peruvian governor Pedro de la Gasca granted Juan Núñez de Prado the territory of Tucumán. Prado established the first Spanish settlement at the town of Barco on the Dulce River. Prado named his province "Tucumán" after Tucumamahao, one of the leaders of the local people who formed an alliance with him. In 1552, Francisco de Aguirre was dispatched to take possession of the territory for Chile. Aguirre followed a repressive policy, triggering a rebellion by the native people. Outnumbered, the colonists were forced to move in 1553 to a new location, where they founded the town of Santiago del Estero.

By 1565, Diego de Villaroel founded San Miguel de Tucumán and the Provincia de Tucumán, Juríes y Diaguitas was organized. Because of frequent attacks by the indigenous peoples, the Malones, in 1685, San Miguel de Tucumán was moved by Miguel de Salas some 65 km (40 mi) from its first location, where it was redeveloped. The aborigines of the region presented a strong resistance to the Spanish, who decided to move the defeated tribes toward Buenos Aires. The most noted of these relocations was the case of the Quilmes, who were moved to the city of Quilmes.

Tucumán was a midpoint for shipments of gold and silver from the Viceroyalty of Peru to Buenos Aires. It produced cattle, textiles, and wood products that provided supplies for the convoys on their way to Buenos Aires. Because of its important geographical position, and as head of the civil and Catholic governments, it acquired special importance during the 18th century.

The creation of the Viceroyalty of the Río de la Plata in 1776 meant the end of the convoys from Perú to Buenos Aires. Tucumán, with 20,000 inhabitants by that time, suffered also from the British imports from the newly opened customs of Buenos Aires, no longer under the monopoly of the Spanish Crown.

In 1783, the Intendancy of Tucumán was divided; Tucumán was set under the control of the Intendancy of Salta del Tucumán, with its centre in Salta. José de San Martín arrived in Tucumán in 1813 and installed the military school. In 1814, the Intendancy of Salta was divided into the present provinces.

On July 9, 1816, at the Congress of Tucumán, the Provincias Unidas del Río de la Plata ("United Provinces of the Río de la Plata") declared their independence from Spain. Internal conflicts delayed the final fusion of the provinces into the República Argentina.

Following the failure of Argentina's first independence-era government, the Directorio, Governor Bernabé Aráoz on March 22, 1820, proclaimed the creation of the Federal Republic of Tucumán. The experiment collapsed, however, when the neighboring provinces of Catamarca and Santiago del Estero withdrew the following year.

The beginning of the 20th century, with the customs restrictions and the arrival of the railway, brought prosperous economic times for the province and its sugarcane production. Numerous landmarks were built, such as Ninth of July Park and the Tucumán Government Palace, and a daily newspaper founded in 1912, La Gaceta, became the most circulated Argentine daily outside Buenos Aires, but the sugar price crisis of the 1960s and President Juan Carlos Onganía's order to have 11 large state-owned sugar mills closed in 1966, hit Tucumán's economy hard, and ushered in an era of instability for the province.

In 1975, President Isabel Perón declared a state of emergency in the province. The decree led to Operation Independence, an official military campaign at least as brutal on local magistrates, lawmakers, and faculty as it was on its stated target, the ERP. Violence did not fully abate until the appointment of General Antonio Domingo Bussi, the operation's commander, as governor at the behest of the dictatorship that deposed Perón in 1976. Efficient as well as ruthless, Bussi oversaw the completion of several stalled public works, but also presided over some of the worst human rights abuses during that painful 1976-77 period. Retaining a sizable following, Bussi was elected governor in his own right in 1995, but lost much of his earlier popularity during his four-year tenure.

Life in Tucumán has since returned to a certain normality. Its economy has recovered strongly during the expansive period Argentina has had in the decade since 2002. José Alperovich, elected governor in 2003, has presided over record investment in public works while reaping criticism for attempts to eliminate term limits for his office.

== Geography ==
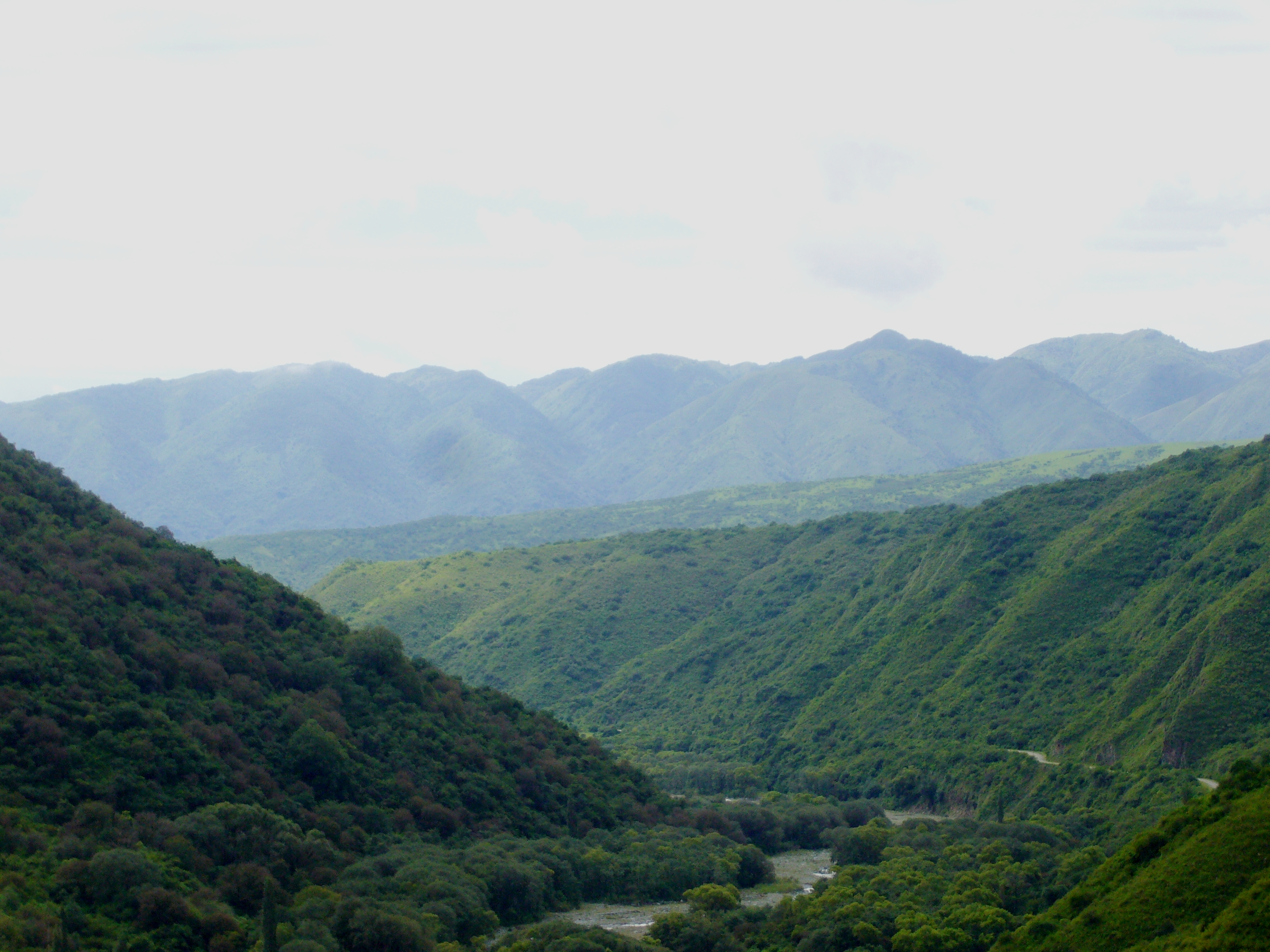
The Hualinchay campsite in the Southern Andean Yungas

Despite Tucumán's small size, it has two main different geographical systems. The east is associated with the Gran Chaco flat lands, while the west presents a mixture of the Sierras of the Pampas to the south and the canyons of the Argentine Northwest to the north. The Cerro del Bolsón is the highest peak at an elevation of 5,550 metres (18,209 ft).

The Salí is the province's main river. Tucumán also has four dams that are used for hydroelectricity and irrigation: El Cadillal on Salí River, the province's most important dam; Embalse Río Hondo on the Hondo River; La Angostura on de los Sosa River; and Escaba on the Marapa River. The Santa María River crosses the Valles Calchaquíes.

=== Climate ===
Köppen climate map of Tucumán Province

Tucuman lies at the convergence of temperate climates and tropical climates further north, retaining characteristics of both in the lowlands. Furthermore, it is highly monsoonal, with precipitation and temperature varying with elevation. As a rule of thumb, the far east is drier and hotter, whereas the Piedmont has many storms in the summer which moderate temperatures. The first foothills are very humid, supporting a dense jungle, and as altitude increases, a thick forest and then cool grasslands. The westernmost areas are once again a bit dryer because of a rain shadow.

The eastern parts have an average annual temperature of 18 to 20 °C (64.4 to 68.0 °F). Summers are hot with mean temperatures averaging between 24 and 26 °C (75.2 and 78.8 °F) while in winter, the mean temperatures are between 10 and 12 °C (50.0 and 53.6 °F). Easternmost parts of the province, which borders the Chaco region are home to the highest and lowest temperatures in the province where absolute maximum temperatures can exceed 40 °C (104.0 °F) while absolute minimum temperatures can reach close to −7 °C (19.4 °F) owing to the accumulation of cold air that descends from the mountains. At higher altitudes, the climate is cooler with summer temperatures averaging 20 °C (68.0 °F) and winter temperatures averaging 10 °C (50.0 °F). The annual temperature in the higher altitudes is 12 to 14 °C (53.6 to 57.2 °F) at an altitude of 2,500 metres (8,202.1 ft) above sea level. Within the valleys located between the mountains, temperatures are cooler with a mean annual temperature of 13.1 °C (55.6 °F) (summers average 17.1 °C (62.8 °F) while winters average 9.0 °C (48.2 °F)) in the Tafi valley.

Precipitation in the lowlands ranges from 600 mm (24 in) in the east, to close to 1,200 mm in the foothills (48 in), in a very monsoonal pattern with 4-5 completely dry winter months, and a peak of about 200 mm (7.9 in) in the rainiest summer month.

The eastward-facing slopes concentrate not only the heaviest precipitation, with spots around 1,800 mm (71 in) falling mostly in the 5 months of the summer monsoon, but also have a unique characteristic, which is that during part of the year, they are constantly immersed in a thick fog, providing humidity for the development of a thick jungle. The climate quickly becomes decidedly temperate with altitude, supporting different kinds of forest which even receive some snow every winter, finally reaching high-altitude grasslands with cool, windy weather year-round.

The abundant precipitation creates a wide area of abundant vegetation and justifies Tucumán's title of "Jardín de la República" (Garden of the Republic).

== Economy ==
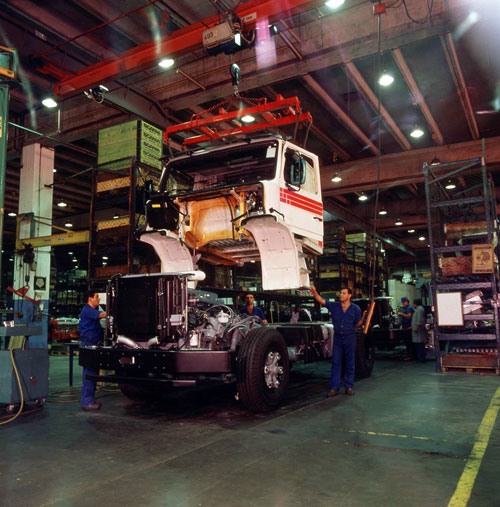
Scania AB factory in the capital

Long among the most underdeveloped Argentine provinces, Tucumán Province has been growing strongly, and its economy, the nation's seventh-largest, reached US$7.2 billion in 2006. Its per capita output of US$5,400 (around US$7,900 in 2011) was nearly 40% below the national average, but compares favourably with that of most of its neighbors. In 2012, the per capita income of the province is of 8,000 dollars

Known internationally for its prodigious sugarcane (with 2,300 km^{2}, and the sugar production, 60% of the country's), Tucumán's economy is quite diversified, and agriculture accounts for about 7% of output. After the sugar crisis of the 1960s, Tucumán tried to diversify its crops, and now cultivates, among others, lemons (world first producer), strawberries, kiwifruit, beans, banana, maize, alfalfa, and soybeans.

Cattle, sheep, and goats are raised mainly for local consumption.

Manufacturing in Tucumán initially centered on sugar production, but has diversified significantly since 1960. Sugar mills comprise about 15% to the total economy. Besides the industrialisation of the sugarcane into sugar, paper, and alcohol, food, textile, automotive, and metallurgical industries are present. Among the latter, the freight-truck assembly operated by the Volkswagen Group-controlled Swedish Scania company is probably the best known. Mining is a minor activity, centered on salt, clay, lime, and other non-metallic extractions. The province is also big in lemons and blueberries, exporting almost 80% of the harvest to other countries.

Cultural and sport tourism is common in the province, and attracts a number of Argentine tourists every year. The Panamerican Highway (Route 9) crosses San Miguel de Tucumán, and connects it with Santiago del Estero and Buenos Aires. The city also serves as a mid-stop for tourists visiting other provinces of the Argentine Northwest. The Teniente General Benjamín Matienzo International Airport has regular flights to Buenos Aires, Lima, Santiago, Cordoba and São Paulo, and receives almost 800,000 passengers every year.

The most visited destinations of the Province are the Campo de los Alisos National Park, Valles Calchaquíes, Tafí del Valle, Ruins of Quilmes, the Diaguita community of Amaicha del Valle, and the city of San Miguel de Tucumán.

Four important universities are in the province: Universidad Nacional de Tucumán (with 60,000 students), Universidad Tecnológica Nacional, Universidad del Norte Santo Tomás de Aquino, and Universidad de San Pablo-T.

== Government ==
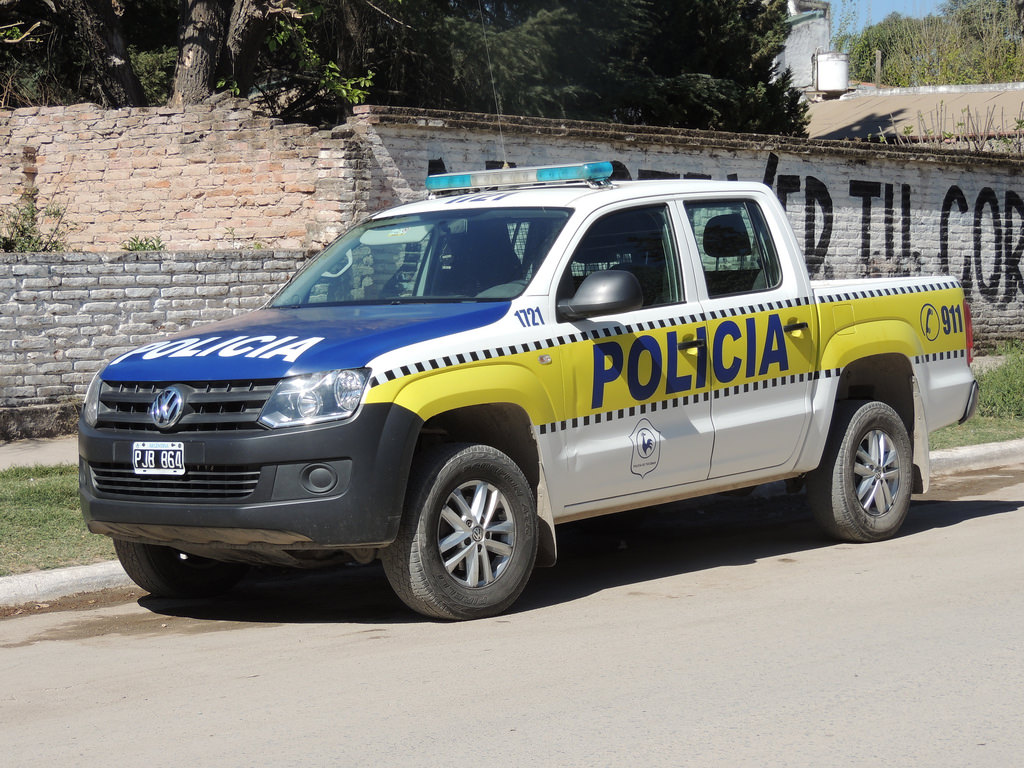
Tucumán Provincial Police

In Argentina, the most important law enforcement organization is the Argentine Federal Police but the additional work is carried out by the Tucumán Provincial Police. The provincial government is divided into three branches: the executive, headed by a popularly elected governor, who appoints the cabinet; the legislative; and the judiciary, headed by the Supreme Court.

The Constitution of Tucumán Province forms the formal law of the province.

== Political divisions ==
The province is divided into 17 departments (Spanish: departamentos).

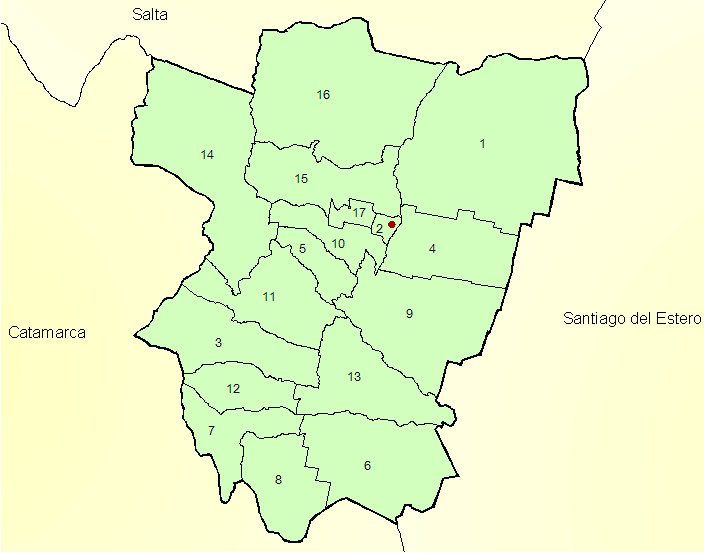
Departments of Tucumán Province

Department	Population	Area	Seat
Burruyacú	45,476	3,605 km^{2} (1,392 sq mi)	Burruyacú
Capital	590,342	90 km^{2} (35 sq mi)	San Miguel de Tucumán
Chicligasta	92,608	1,267 km^{2} (489 sq mi)	Concepción
Cruz Alta	228,077	1,255 km^{2} (485 sq mi)	Banda del Río Salí
Famaillá	42,702	427 km^{2} (165 sq mi)	Famaillá
Graneros	15,540	1,678 km^{2} (648 sq mi)	Graneros
Juan Bautista Alberdi	34,776	730 km^{2} (280 sq mi)	Juan Bautista Alberdi
La Cocha	21,218	917 km^{2} (354 sq mi)	La Cocha
Leales	66,392	2,027 km^{2} (783 sq mi)	Bella Vista
Lules	93,552	540 km^{2} (210 sq mi)	Lules
Monteros	77,551	1,169 km^{2} (451 sq mi)	Monteros
Rio Chico	64,962	585 km^{2} (226 sq mi)	Aguilares
Simoca	36,973	1,261 km^{2} (487 sq mi)	Simoca
Tafí del Valle	22,440	2,741 km^{2} (1,058 sq mi)	Tafí del Valle
Tafí Viejo	172,986	1,210 km^{2} (470 sq mi)	Tafí Viejo
Trancas	23,494	2,862 km^{2} (1,105 sq mi)	Trancas
Yerba Buena	102,741	160 km^{2} (62 sq mi)	Yerba Buena

== Towns and villages ==
- Anca Juli
- Los Ralos (settlement)
- San Pedro de Colalao (settlement)

== See also ==
- Governor of Tucumán Province
- Septiembre Musical
- Casa de Tucumán
- Provinces of Argentina
- Republic of Tucumán
- Empanada
- Sándwich de milanesa
- Ninth of July Park
- Battle of Tucumán
