= Battle of San Cala =

Coordinates: 31°11′S 65°05′W

Battle of San Cala or Sancala
- Part of the Argentine civil wars
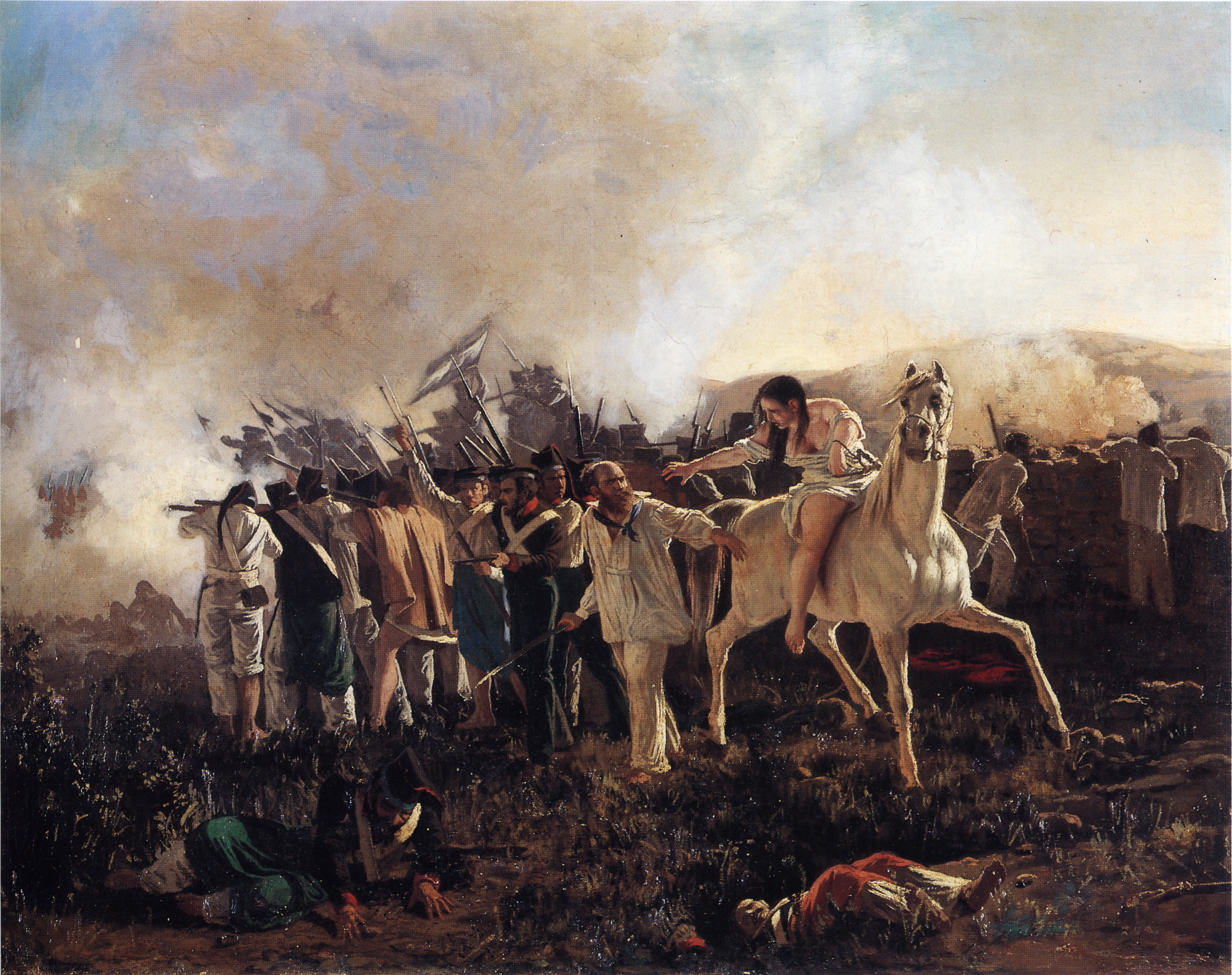
- Batalla de San Cala, oil on canvas by Juan Manuel Blanes, 1876
Date	9 January 1841
Location	San Carlos Minas, Córdoba Province, Argentina
Result	Federalist victory

Belligerents
(Argentine Confederation) Federalists	Unitarians (Central Government)

Commanders and leaders
Ángel Pacheco	José María Vilela

Strength
~1,100	~1,500

Casualties and losses
	400–600

The Battle of San Cala (or of Sancala or San Calá), fought in the present-day Minas Department, Córdoba, Argentina, on January 9, 1842, between Unitarian forces and Federalists, who under the command of General Ángel Pacheco, prevented the expansion of the Unitarian Coalition of the North into the provinces of the Cuyo.

== Prelude ==
After the failure of Juan Lavalle's campaign to invade the province of Buenos Aires, this Unitarian general moved to the province of Santa Fe and, from there, retreated toward the province of Córdoba. But a misunderstanding with the forces under the command of General Gregorio Aráoz de Lamadrid caused Lavalle to suffer a terrible defeat at the Battle of Quebracho Herrado.

Not considering themselves to be sufficiently strong in Córdoba, both generals agreed to retire toward the northern Argentine provinces, which were securely in the Unitarian camp. At the same time, they sent two secondary columns to seize other provinces. One of these, under the command of Mariano Acha, was defeated in its attempt to take the province of Santiago del Estero.

The second column was placed under the command of Colonel José María Vilela. The best of Lavalle's troops composed this column, and their mission was to support the Unitarian revolutionaries who were, it was thought, ready to rise in the provinces of San Luis and Mendoza.

== The Surprise of San Cala ==
As this second column headed to the Valley of Traslasierra, and near the Indian village of Sancala (near present-day San Carlos Minas, Córdoba), a division of Federalist cavalry sent under the command of General Ángel Pacheco in pursuit of the Unitarian column were rapidly closing in on it.

Overly confident, Vilela had secured all his men in a huge corral surrounded by high stone walls, and he let them spend the night there without the vigilance of effective sentries. Pacheco arrived in the vicinity of the corral at night; as his forces were inferior in numbers to those of his enemy, he decided to trust in surprise to gain a victory: Pacheco attacked at midnight, with his cavalry in column and through the only entrance into the corral. There was a slaughter with most of Vilela's soldiers perishing.

== Aftermath ==
As the battle ended, Colonel Vilela himself had to flee through the desert toward Catamarca. He would fight in the Battle of Famaillá, the final defeat of General Lavalle's Unitarian forces, and together with Marco Avellaneda, the governor of the province of Tucumán, would be executed by Federalist firing squad at Metán.

General Pacheco would go on to organize a powerful Federalist army, with which he undertook a new campaign in Cuyo. In September 1842, at the battle of Rodeo del Medio, he would destroy the forces under General Lamadrid, last of the forces of the Coalition of the North, assuring the absolute dominion of the Federalist party in Argentina for another ten years.

The village of San Cala itself must be mentioned. Its inhabitants, strongly affected by the bloody battle and with their cemetery full of the bodies of the men killed in that battle, in the following years moved to a place a short distance away, the present village of San Carlos or San Carlos Minas. The village of San Cala was deserted from then on and remains so today.
