= Sixto Casanovas =

Argentine politician

Sixto Casanovas (1802 in Salta Province – August 1852 in Buenos Aires), was an Argentine politician, provisional governor of Córdoba Province (1835).

In 1816 he joined the Army of the North, in a dragoons regiment. He was taken prisoner by the royalists and spent time at the Callao prison, near the city of Lima. In 1821, as part of the negotiations with viceroy Joaquín de la Pezuela, general San Martín obtained the freedom of many other officers, including Casanovas.

He joined San Martin's Army of the Andes, and fought at Torata and Moquegua. In this last battle he was wounded and taken prisoner again being moved to Chicuito island on Lake Titicaca, until he was freed after the royalist surrender at the Battle of Ayacucho. Casanovas returned to Buenos Aires in 1824 and was named an officer of the dragoons regiment.

He was named an officer in a dragoon regiment — armed cavalry — and fought in the 1825 campaign under the orders of Juan Lavalle and Juan Manuel de Rosas, on the south of Buenos Aires Province.

In 1826 he went to the Banda Oriental (present-day Uruguay, where he fought in the war with Brazil, and took part on the Battle of Ituzaingó under colonel José María Paz; where the colonel was promoted to general and Casanovas to the rank of colonel.

== First civil war ==
Casanovas returned to Buenos Aires in 1828 and supported Lavalle's revolution in December, then shortly after he went to Córdoba, under orders from general Paz. Fought at the Battle of San Roque, and La Tablada and then at Oncativo. He also took part on the repression of federal rebels in the Córdoba hills.

When Paz fell prisoner in mid-1831, Gregorio Aráoz de Lamadrid decided to retreat to Tucumán. Casanovas decided to stay and remain as part of the interim governor's (Mariano Fragueiro) guard. Fragueiro signed a treaty with the caudillo Estanislao López and after the signing, the federal army entered Córdoba, and Casanovas was a prisoner again. By order of the new federal caudillos, the Reynafé brothers, he was freed and put in command of a regiment of dragoons. He then helped the Reinafé brothers to defeat Ruiz Huidobro's revolution — instigated by Facundo Quiroga — and Casanovas was confirmed as commander of the forces in the provincial capital.

== Córdoba's governor ==
After the assassination of Quiroga in 1835, the Reynafés were deposed and arrested. Rosas had taken power in Buenos Aires, and nobody wanted to take charge of the local government. For a short while his government minister, Pedro Nolasco Rodríguez was named as interim to the post, but as he declined to send the prisoners to Buenos Aires, Casanovas was elected in his place. When the federal governors of other provinces (Pascual Echagüe, Estanislao López and Rosas), learned of his appointment, they did not accept his government. Casanovas had to quit ten days after assuming the post. He captured Santos Pérez, Quiroga's assassin, but he let him escape. He did not go far; was recaptured and sent to Buenos Aires, where he was executed by firing squad.

Casanovas remained in command of his regiment, and trying his loyalty not be doubted, he supported all of caudillo Manuel Quebracho López's repressions against his enemies in Córdoba. In 1839 he was named to as military commander of the departments on the north of the province.

== 1840 Revolution ==
In August 1840, with Lavalle retreating and about to enter Córdoba, Casanovas rebelled against the current Córdoba governor, but he was defeated at Río Seco. He took refuge in Tucumán, and returned in November when López was deposed.

Lamadrid, who had entered Córdoba, sent him to the Battle of Quebracho Herrado, then he returned to Córdoba. He then moved to Tucumán with Lavalle and Lamadrid. Casanovas was accused of habing caused the defeat of José María Vilela at the Battle of San Cala, for having had revealed their position, but historians think him innocent of the charge. He fought at the Battle of Famaillá, and escaped after their defeat.

== Last years ==
He spent some years exiled in Bolivia, Chile and lastly in Montevideo.

He placed himself under the orders of general Urquiza, but it is not known if he fought at the Battle of Caseros where Rosas was defeated. He supported Urquiza's policies in Buenos Aires, and was in charge of a federal battalion. He was still very much hated by the Unitarian Party who were taking control of the city, and who would depose governor Vicente López y Planes in the September revolution which Casanovas did not get to see. He was assassinated in 1852 in a Buenos Aires street by a unitarian party member (note: a political movement, not related to the Christian church), who still believed he was guilty of the treason of 1841.

== Bibliography ==
- Bischoff, Efraín. "La sorpresa de Sancala". Todo es Historia Magazine nr 257 (in Spanish).
- Bischoff, Efraín (1989). Historia de Córdoba (in Spanish). Buenos Aires: Ed. Plus Ultra.
- Quesada, Ernesto (1965). Pacheco y la campaña de Cuyo (in Spanish). Buenos Aires: Ed. Plus Ultra.
