= San Justo =

San Justo is the Spanish name for Saint Justus.

As a place-name, San Justo may refer to:

- San Justo, Santa Fe, the main township of San Justo Department, Argentina
- San Justo Department (disambiguation), various places
- San Justo, Buenos Aires, a town in La Matanza Partido, Argentina
- San Justo, Entre Ríos, a town in Entre Ríos, Argentina
- San Justo, Zamora, a municipality in the province of Zamora, Spain

San Justo may also refer to:

- Spanish ship San Justo
