= Quebracho Herrado =

Quebracho Herrado may refer to:

- Quebracho Herrado, Córdoba, a small community in San Justo Department of Córdoba Province, Argentina
- Battle of Quebracho Herrado (28 November 1840), an engagement in the Argentine Civil wars
