= Luxardo =

Luxardo may refer to:

- Girolamo Luxardo, Italian liqueur manufacturer
- Plaza Luxardo, village in Argentina
