= Minas Department =

Minas Department may refer to:

- Minas Department, Neuquén in Argentina
- Minas Department, Córdoba in Argentina
