= Bernabé Piedrabuena (soldier) =

Argentine soldier and politician

Governor of Tucumán Province
- In office November 1838 – December 1840
- Preceded by: Alejandro Heredia
- Succeeded by: Pedro Garmendia

Personal details
- Born: San Miguel de Tucumán
- Died: 1841 San Miguel de Tucumán
- Party: Federal
- Occupation: Soldier

Bernabé Piedrabuena (died 1841) was an Argentine soldier and politician who was Governor of Tucumán Province from 1838 to 1840.

== Background ==
Bernabé Piedrabuena was born in San Miguel de Tucumán, capital of Tucumán province. He married Vicenta Zavaleta Ruiz Huidobro, and they had a son, Bernabé Piedrabuena Zavaleta, who was born in 1830. Their grandson, also Bernabé Piedrabuena, would become Bishop of Tucumán.

== Tucumán governor ==
Piedrabuena took office as Governor of Tucumán Province after the murder of Alejandro Heredia in November 1838. During his administration, his government minister Marco Avellaneda started a movement to overthrow the regime of Juan Manuel de Rosas. Piedrabuena encouraged the movement. The governor of Santiago del Estero Province, Felipe Ibarra, reported what was happening to Buenos Aires. In response, Rosas commissioned General Gregorio Aráoz de Lamadrid to withdraw arms from Tucumán that remained from the war against the Bolivia-Peru confederacy. However, Lamadrid joined the revolution.

On 7 April 1840 the Chamber of Representatives of Tucumán proclaimed its opposition to the rule of Juan Manuel de Rosas. The next day, Governor Piedrabuena wrote to his relative, Manuel Solá, the governor of Salta Province. He emphasized that Tucumán was not short of money, and asked for the support of Salta in the revolt. He pointed out that if Tucumán failed, Salta would also be ruined. Solá responded to the appeal and became one of the most active figures in the alliance against Rosas. On September 24, 1840 the Northern League was formerly declared. The League comprised the Tucumán, Salta, La Rioja, Catamarca and Jujuy provinces.

Lamadrid, who was appointed head of the rebel troops, took the city of Córdoba and waited there to be joined by Brigadier Juan Lavalle. But General Manuel Oribe, who had left Buenos Aires with 10,000 troops, reached Lavalle on 28 November 1840 and defeated him in the Battle of Quebracho Herrado, virtually destroying his army. Lamadrid evacuated Córdoba Province, which was taken by Oribe in December, and retreated to Tucumán. At this critical period, on 1 December 1840 the Tucumán House of Representatives accepted Piedrabuena's resignation as Governor and appointed Pedro de Garmendia in his place.

== Death ==
Piedrabuena died in 1841 in San Miguel de Tucumán.
