= Pedro de Garmendia =

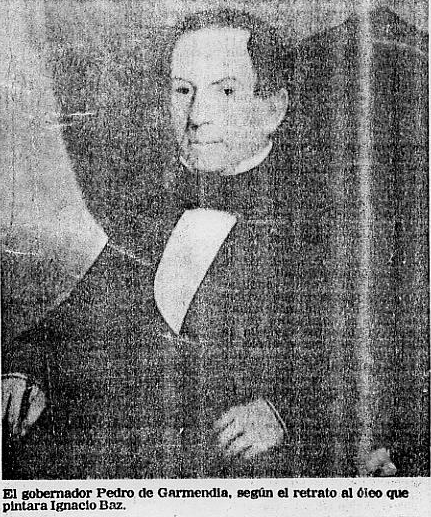
- Pedro de Garmendia from an oil painting by Ignacio Baz

Governor of Tucumán Province
- In office December 1840 – January 1841
- Preceded by: Bernabé Piedrabuena
- Succeeded by: Gregorio Aráoz de Lamadrid

Personal details
- Born: San Miguel de Tucumán
- Died: 1841 San Miguel de Tucumán
- Party: Federal
- Occupation: Soldier

Pedro de Garmendia (1794-1865) was briefly Governor of Tucumán Province in Argentina from December 1840 to January 1841 during a civil war between Unitarian and Federalist factions.

== Background ==
Pedro de Garmendia was a wealthy resident of San Miguel de Tucumán, born in 1794 to José Ignacio de Garmendia y Aguirre and Elena Alurralde. His house was on what today is the corner of 24 de Septiembre and Laprida, across from the cathedral. He was a member of the Tucumán House of Representatives that declared against the rule of Juan Manuel de Rosas, and was a minister of Governor Bernabé Piedrabuena.

== Governor of Tucumán ==
On 1 December 1840 the House of Representatives accepted Piedrabuena's resignation and appointed Pedro de Garmendia as his replacement. The election was controversial, since the House was divided. On assuming office, Garmendia confirmed Dr. Marco Manuel de Avellaneda as his chief minister, a post he had held under Piedrabuena. Avellaneda was the driving force in the Unitarian League against Rosas. On 10 January, Garmendia delegated the government to General Gregorio Aráoz de Lamadrid.

== Exile ==
After the Battle of Famaillá in Tucumán and the Battle of Rodeo del Medio in Mendoza the League of the North collapsed and its leaders fled to neighboring republics. Garmendia chose Chile. His letters written from exile are eloquent of his despair for the future of Argentina under Rosas, but he could see no prospect of removing the dictator.

Garmendia died in 1865. The town of Gobernador Garmendia is named after him.
