= José María Bustillo =

José María Bustillo may refer to:

- José María Bustillo (Argentina), Argentine general and politician
- José María Bustillo (Honduran), military and politician and a President of Honduras
