= Brinkmann, Córdoba =

Brinkmann
- Town
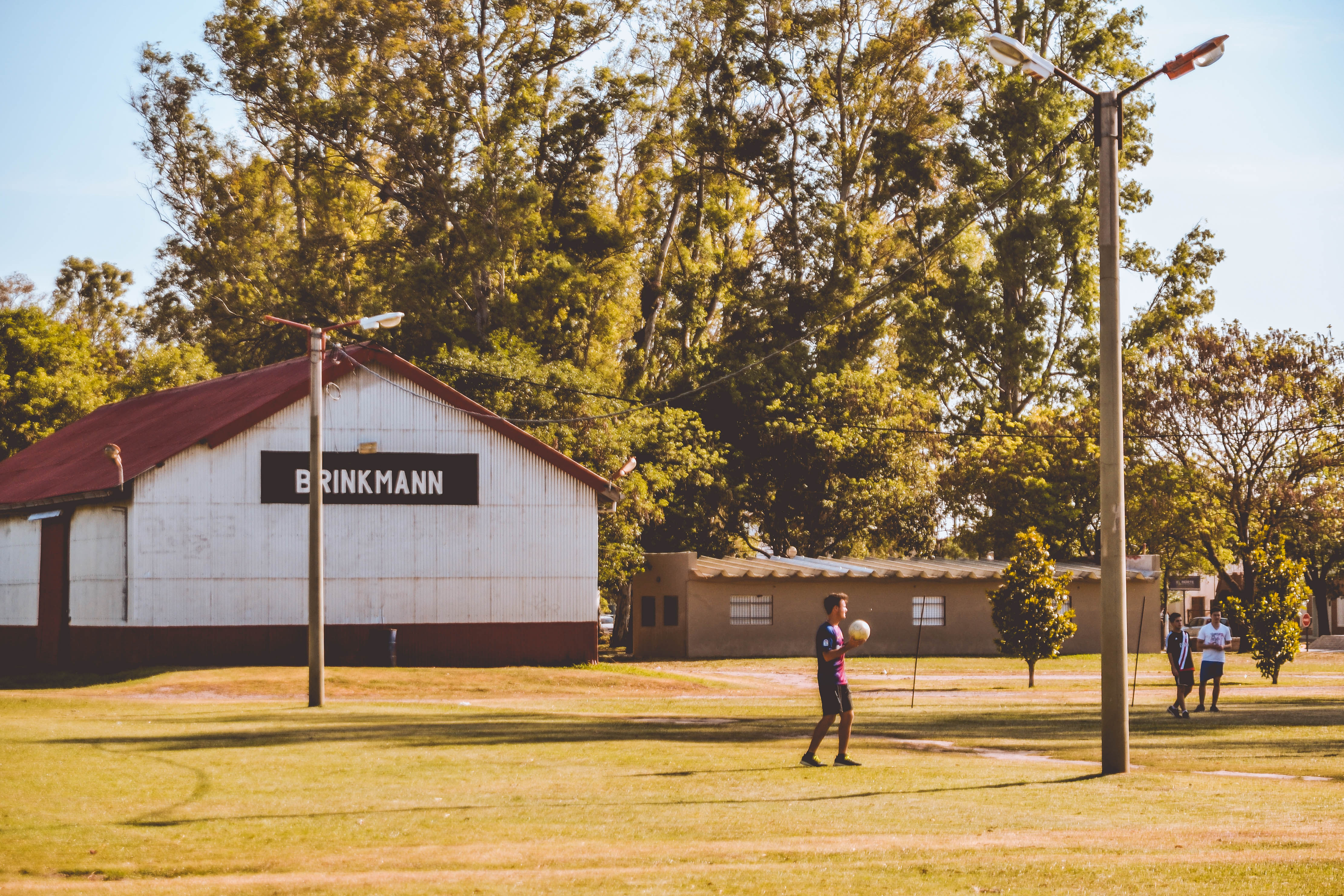

- Location within Córdoba Province Location within Argentina
- Coordinates: 30°52′01″S 62°02′01″W
- Country: Argentina
- Province: Córdoba
- Department: San Justo
- Foundation: 30 December 1892

Government
  - Intendant: Mauricio Actis (PJ)

Area
  - Total: 141.25 km^{2} (54.54 sq mi)
- Elevation: 100 m (330 ft)

Population (2010)
  - Total: 9,890
  - Density: 70.0/km^{2} (181/sq mi)
- Time zone: UTC−3 (ART)

Brinkmann /´brɪkmən/ is a town located in the San Justo Department in the Province of Córdoba in central Argentina. It is 272 km (169 mi) from the city of Córdoba; 65 km (40 mi) north of San Francisco, very close to Mar Chiquita Lake and the border with the province.

== History ==
Brinkmann was founded in 1890 (officially in 1892) by Julius Brinkmann (also known as Abraham Julius Brinkmann or Julio Brinkmann), a German entrepreneur.

== Transportation ==
Provincial Route 1 connects Brinkmann with the rest of the Córdoba road network and continues north after passing through the Santa Fe Province under Provincial Route 23. A railway branch connects Brinkmann to the south with the city of San Francisco and to the north with the towns of Morteros and Suardi. It belongs to the most important "Dairy Basin" in the country, since most of its fields are dedicated to dairy production and the entire area is populated by dairy industries.

=== Twin towns ===
- Giaveno, Italy

== Tourism and Festivals ==
The city of Brinkmann is located nearby the Mar de Ansenuza lake, which is the fifth most saline lake of the world and has a great diversity of both flora and fauna. Tourists can visit the Archivo Histórico Municipal which is the city´s museum and there are also festivals such as the Festival Nacional del Humor y la Canción and the international kids football tournament.
