= San Justo Department, Córdoba =

San Justo Department Departamento San Justo
- Department
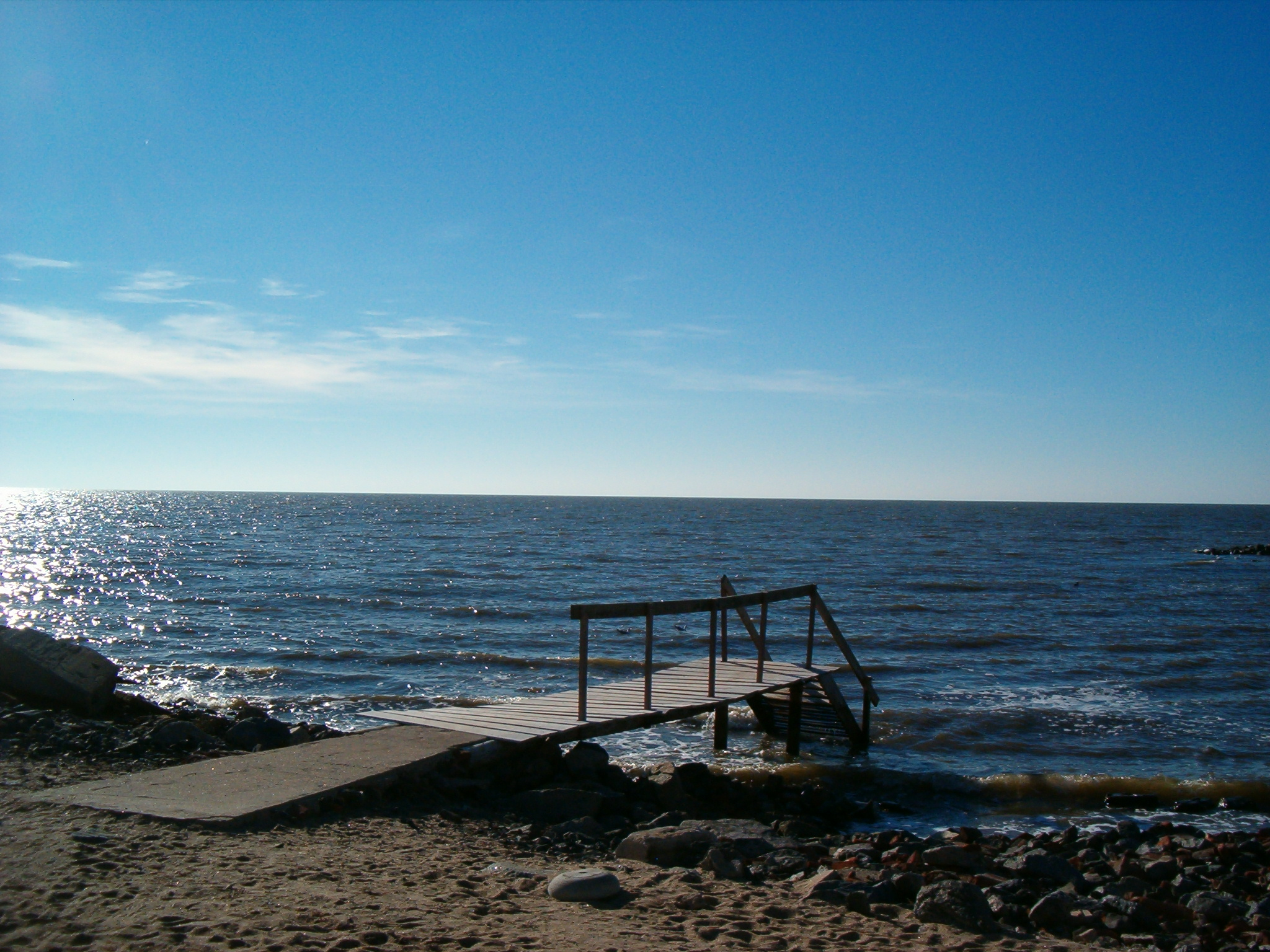
- Mar Chiquita (the "little sea")

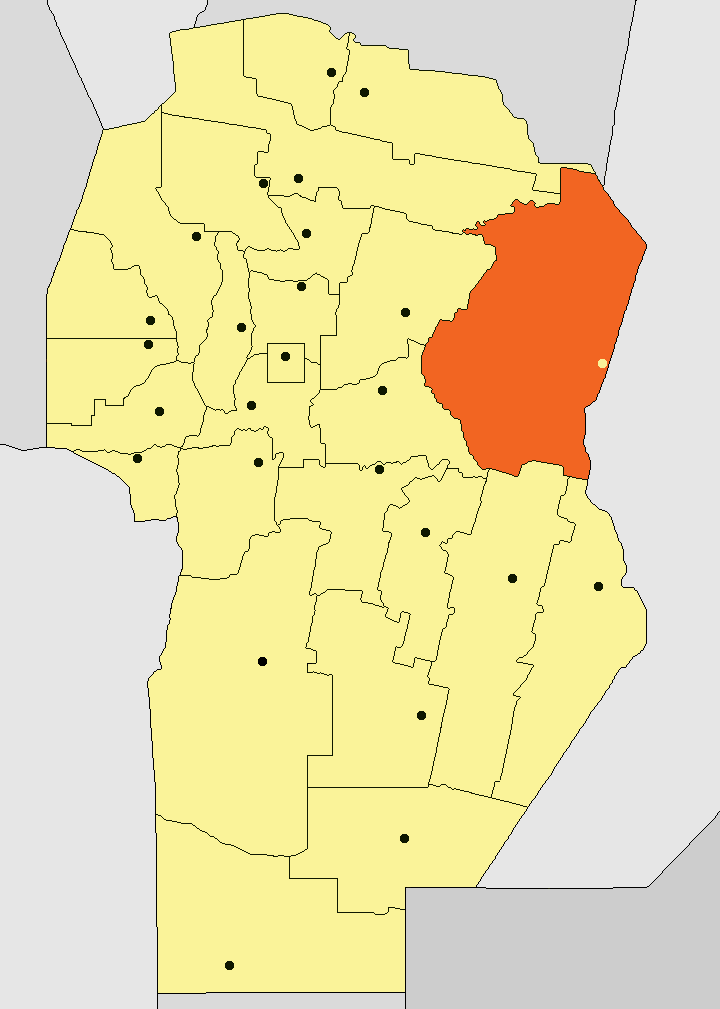
- Location of San Justo Department in Córdoba Province
- Coordinates: 31°26′S 62°04′W
- Country: Argentina
- Province: Córdoba
- Capital: San Francisco

Area
  - Total: 13,677 km^{2} (5,281 sq mi)

Population (2001 census [INDEC])
  - Total: 190,182
  - Density: 13.905/km^{2} (36.014/sq mi)
  - Pop. change (1991-2001): +7.63%
- Time zone: UTC-3 (ART)
- Postal code: X2400
- Dialing code: 03564
- Distances to
- Buenos Aires: 610 km (380 mi)
- Córdoba: 209 km (130 mi)

San Justo Department is a department of Córdoba Province in Argentina.

The provincial subdivision has a population of about 190,182 inhabitants in an area of 13,677 km^{2}, and its capital city is San Francisco, which is located around 670 km from Buenos Aires. The department is home to Mar Chiquita, the largest inland body of water in Argentina.

== Settlements ==
- Alicia
- Altos de Chipión
- Arroyito
- Balnearia
- Brinkmann
- Colonia Anita
- Colonia Iturraspe
- Colonia Las Pichanas
- Colonia Marina
- Colonia Prosperidad
- Colonia San Bartolomé
- Colonia San Pedro
- Colonia Vignaud
- Colonia Valtelina
- Devoto
- El Arañado
- El Fortín
- El Tío
- Freyre
- La Francia
- La Paquita
- La Tordilla
- Las Varas
- Las Varillas
- Marull
- Miramar
- Morteros
- Plaza Luxardo
- Porteña
- Quebracho Herrado
- Sacanta
- San Francisco
- Saturnino María Laspiur
- Seeber
- Toro Pujio
- Tránsito
- Villa Concepción del Tío
- Villa San Esteban

== See also ==
- San Justo Department (disambiguation)
