= Giaveno =

Giaveno Giaven (Piedmontese) Dzavën (Arpitan)
- Comune
- Comune di Giaveno
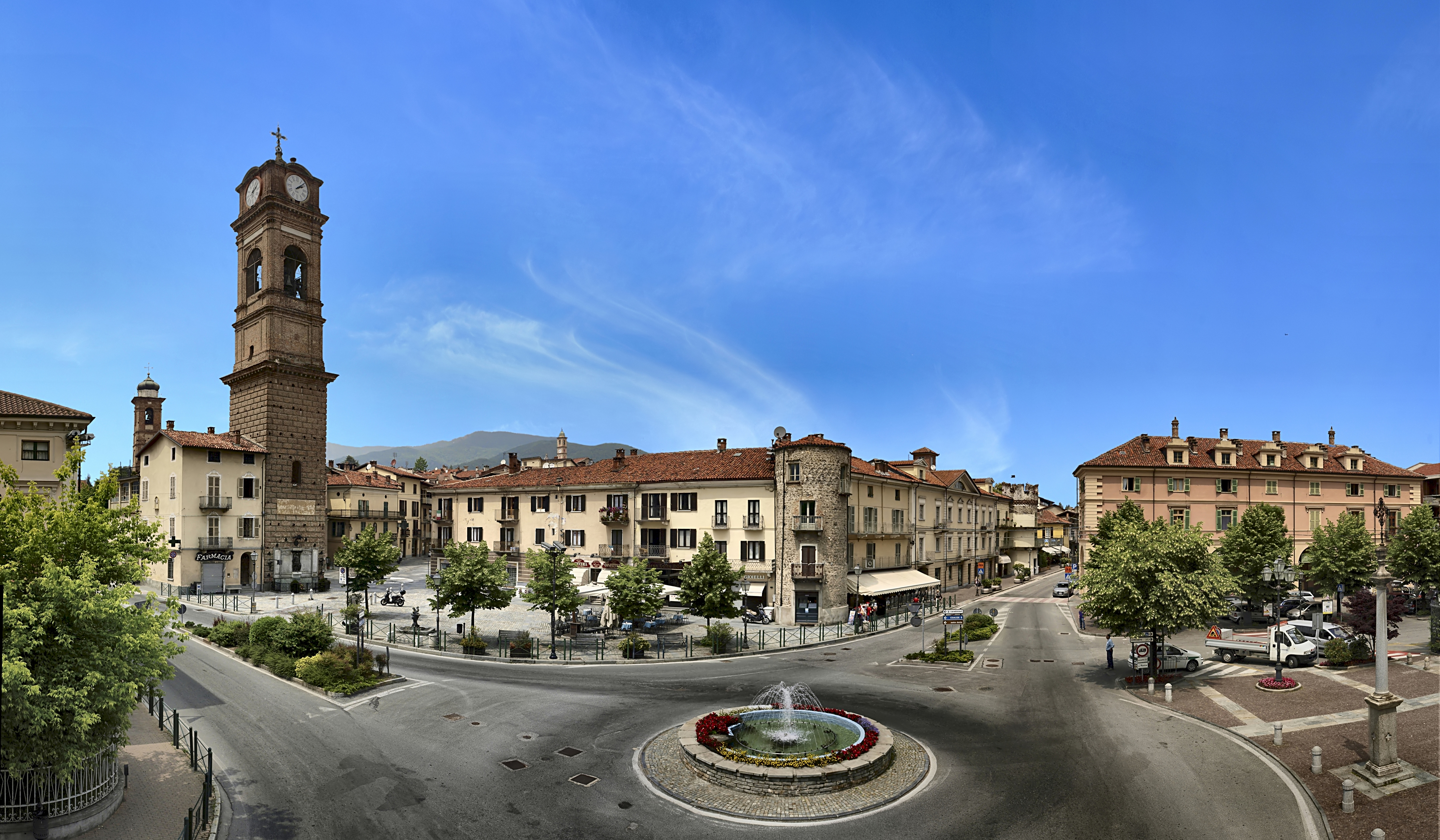

- Coat of arms

- Location within Italy Location within Piedmont
- Coordinates: 45°2′N 7°21′E
- Country: Italy
- Region: Piedmont
- Metropolitan city: Turin (TO)
- Frazioni: Alpe Colombino, Buffa, Chiarmetta, Colpastore, Dalmassi, Maddalena, Mollar dei Franchi, Pontepietra, Provonda, Ruata Sangone, Sala, Selvaggio, Villa

Government
  - Mayor: Stefano Olocco (Civic List)

Area
  - Total: 72.0 km^{2} (27.8 sq mi)
- Elevation: 506 m (1,660 ft)

Population (31 March 2025)
  - Total: 16,356
  - Density: 227/km^{2} (588/sq mi)
- Demonym: Giavenesi
- Time zone: UTC+1 (CET)
  - Summer (DST): UTC+2 (CEST)
- Postal code: 10094
- Dialing code: 011
- Patron saint: Saint Lawrence and Saint Antero Pope (co-patron)
- Saint day: 10 August, 3 January (co-patron)
- Website: Official website

Giaveno (Piedmontese: Giaven; Arpitan: Dzavën) is a comune (municipality) in the Metropolitan City of Turin in the Italian region of Piedmont, located about 30 kilometres (19 mi) west of Turin.

== History ==
Giaveno has very ancient origins; some local historians trace the first settlement back to Roman times. The important Gavi family of Augusta Taurinorum (Turin) built a farmhouse here, probably in the 1st century AD; to corroborate this thesis there are some random finds of necropolis materials in the fields at the Sanctuary of the Madonna del Bussone (Villa village) and a stretch of paving at the bridge of the Tortorello torrent.

It is said that in 773 Charlemagne crossed the watershed that divides the Val di Susa from that of the Sangone, came to the plain located near the village Gavensis and caught the Longobards from behind between the Chiusa di S. Michele and Villardora and attained victory by defeating them there.

In 1103 the Count of Savoy, Umberto II, donated the territory of Giaveno to the Abbey of San Michele della Chiusa, but Frederick Barbarossa, despot of the time, removed it from the Abbey on 26 January 1195 and gave it to Charles I, bishop of Turin.

Giaveno returned to the abbots of San Michele on 21 February 1209 with a donation from the Count of Savoy Tommaso I, who fortified the square with a robust wall and built a castle there.

Subsequently, in 1347, Abbot Rodolfo di Mombello decided to "villam iavenni murare", with two trebuchet walls (about 6 metres high), interspersed with five circular towers. The perimeter of the "Abbey Citadel" is still clearly legible today.

In 1611 a new patron S. Antero, whose relics were moved from Rome to Giaveno, joined the owner of the protection of the village, S. Lorenzo. In 1622 Cardinal Maurizio asked for and obtained from the Holy See a bull approving the erection of the Insigne Collegiate of San Lorenzo Martire. At the end of the seventeenth century numerous raids and looting by the French general Nicolas Catinat stripped the villages, the castle and the churches of their valuables.

1630 proved to be a particularly critical year for the country, since during the Second Monferrato War (an episode which can be considered part of the wider Thirty Years' War ) Giaveno was occupied by French troops led by the Duke of Montmorency. In the meantime, the plague erupted throughout Piedmont, causing many victims.

The Dukes of Savoy went to war against the French. The Marshal of France Nicolas Catinat invaded Piedmont, setting it on fire, and, after the French victory at the battle of Marsaglia (1693), Giaveno suffered looting and burning.

The French were defeated and driven out of Piedmont after the fatal siege of Turin on 8 September 1706. Important pages of history were written during the Resistance period in World War II (1943–1945), which saw the partisans and the entire population rise up against German and Fascist forces. For these episodes, the town of Giaveno was awarded the silver medal for military value by President Oscar Luigi Scalfaro in 1997.

== Twin towns ==
- Brinkmann, Argentina
- Chevreuse, France
- Novska, Croatia
- Saint-Jean-de-Maurienne, France

== Notable natives ==
- Dino Pogolotti (1879–1923), real estate entrepreneur
