= Dino Pogolotti =

Italian real estate developer in Cuba

- Born: Domenico Pogolotti; 1879; Giaveno, Torino; Piedmont, Italy
- Died: 1923 (aged 43–44); Giaveno, Torino; Piedmont, Italy
- Spouse: Grace Margaret George (married 1897)
- Children: 1

Domenico "Dino" Pogolotti (1879–1923) was a real estate entrepreneur best known for the development in 1911 of what is still known today as the "Barrio Pogolotti" in Havana, Cuba. He's the father of the Cuban painter Marcelo Pogolotti and grandfather of Cuban intellectual Graciela Pogolotti.

== Early life ==
Dino Pogolotti was born in 1879 in Giaveno, a small town near Turin in Piedmont, Italy, son of bakers. At the end of the 19th century and the beginning of the 20th, it's estimated that about 10 million Italians emigrated abroad in search of work. In 1895, Pogolotti left his home country for New York, USA, first working as a waiter and a porter then improvising as a French language teacher. One of his pupils, Grace Margaret George, a middle-class American girl, became his wife. Thanks to Grace's family connections, he managed to become the secretary of the American consul in Cuba.

== Havana and the Barrio ==
Dino Pogolotti arrived in Cuba during a very particular time for the island: after the 1895 war of independence from Spain, after the yellow fever epidemic and the Valeriano Weyler's dreadful reconcentrados policy. Thousands of farmers had been moved away from their homes, infrastructures and food sources, and the land was very devalued. Taking advantage of the situation, Pogolotti invested his wife's money in large land plots in the area of Marianao, west of the capital, and started to convert them into urban areas. In 1910, a law was introduced with the aim to create a community to resolve the serious housing problem rising from migration to the city. Pogolotti's project based on the European social housing model was selected among two others, and so was started the new development in Marianao. On the 24th of February 1912, the new barrio was inaugurated and houses assigned through a raffle. There were 950 houses, an aqueduct, a school, a cinema and a food shop that still stands today.

== Death and legacy ==
In his early forties, Dino Pogolotti was a very rich and famous man, but hopelessly ill. By then a widower, he decided to return to his hometown, where he died in 1923. Barrio Pogolotti is historically very important to Cubans. It is the first working-class neighborhood built in Havana. In one of the houses of the Barrio, on avenida 61, the remains of Antonio Guiteras, founder of Joven Cuba, and Carlos Aponte were hidden. Carlos J. Finlay, the Cuban physician who first theorized that a mosquito was the carrier of the yellow fever virus, had his laboratory on avenida 90. In 2010, a documentary film, "Mi Pogolotti Querido," was produced by Italian director, Enrica Viola. It is the result of two years of research by Viola into the saga of Dino Pogolotti and his family.
