= Marcelo Pogolotti =

Cuban painter and writer

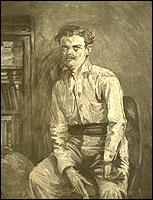
- Born: 1902; Havana, Cuba
- Died: 1988 (aged 85–86); Havana, Cuba
- Known for: Painting
- Style: Surrealism, Futurism
- Movement: Cuban modernism
- Father: Dino Pogolotti

Marcelo Pogolotti (1902–1988) was a Cuban painter and son of Dino Pogolotti. Born in Havana and died in Havana. His style of art was considered advance for its time, which would be demonstrated in an event titled 1927 Exposición de Arte Nuevo that the start of modern art in Cuba.

== Artist's career ==
He spent his childhood between Cuba and Europe, beginning his artistic journey in Europe in 1928. He also studying abroad in United States and Italy. He was attracted to surrealism art style and futurism, incorporating both elements into his work. His more instinctive style of art was developed due to his lifestyle having to adapt and change. By 1939 his life would take a turn when he would suffer from glaucoma. He had to move back to Cuba the eve of World War II. He stopped producing his art. Nevertheless, he was very influential to younger artists.

== Exhibitions ==
2018: Marcelo Pogolotti: Vanguardia, Ideología, Sociedad

2008: Arte Americas The Latin American Art Fair, Tresart, Coral Gables, Florida, USA
