= José María Bustillo (Argentina) =

Argentine general and politician

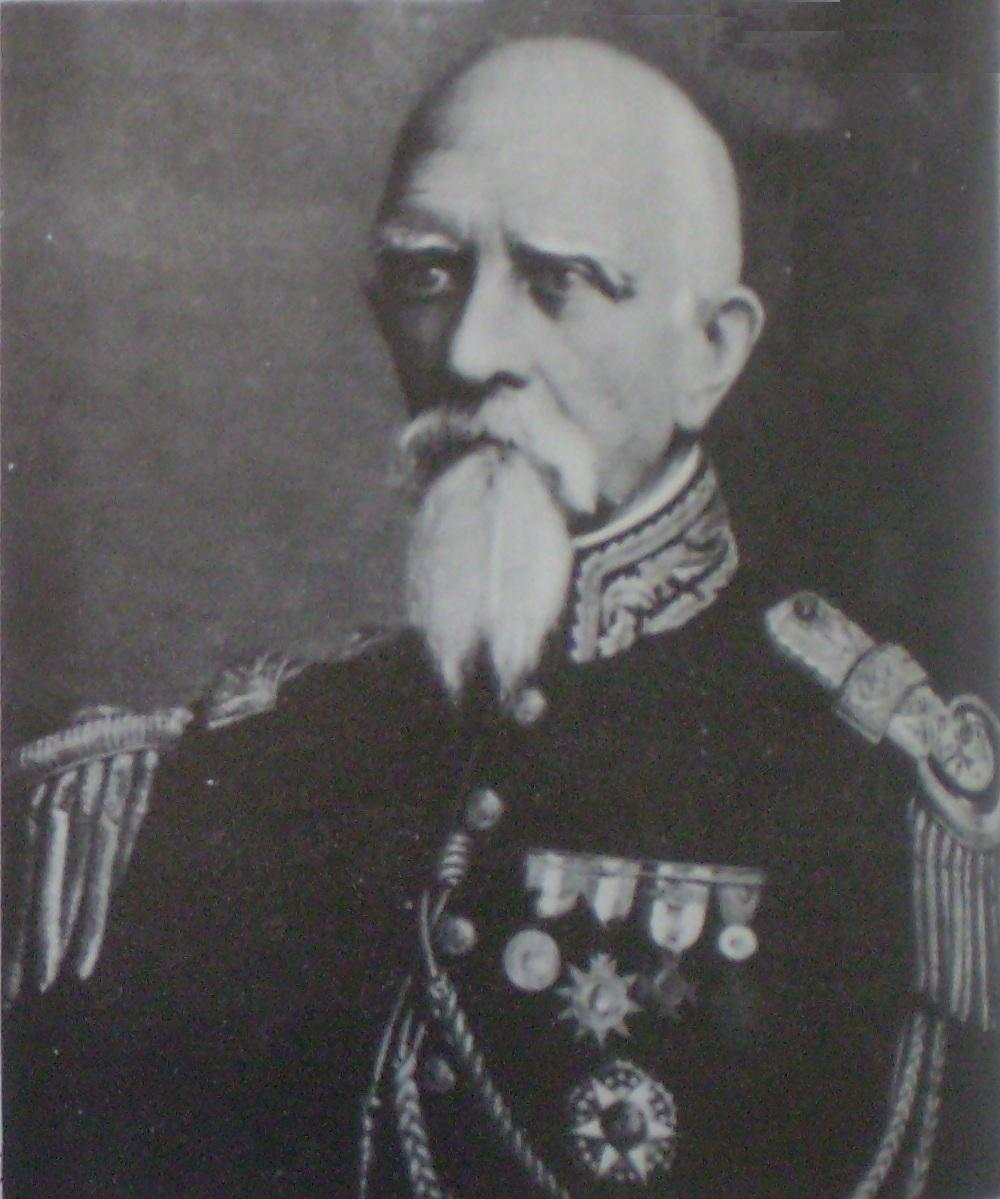
José María Bustillo

José María Bustillo (October 18, 1816 – June 27, 1910) was an Argentine general and a politician.

== Biography ==
His father was a militia officer who fought in the British invasions of the Río de la Plata. As a youth, he served as a judicial government official, working within the country as well as in Peru. Later on, he worked in mail services as an employee of administration during the Juan Manuel de Rosas government. In 1839, his brother José Manuel participated in the Ramón Maza conspiracy against the governor Juan Manuel de Rosas, for which he was persecuted by La Mazorca and arrested, together with his brother.

He fled to Montevideo, Uruguay, in the same ship as General Paz and joined Juan Lavalle's army in Entre Ríos. Participated in the Battle of Sauce Grande and went into the province of Corrientes with General Paz. He was also part of the 1842 campaign and fought in the Battle of Caaguazú, which gave power over to the unitarios. In the meantime, his brother José Manuel was killed in combat in the Battle of Quebracho Herrado.

He accompanied Paz to Entre Ríos, and when Paz was pushed from there he accompanied him on his return to Montevideo. He was part of the defense of the city against the government loyalist Manuel Oribe, who was acting as second-in-command to César Díaz, and while participating in this defense he led a regiment of freed blacks. In 1846, he returned to Corrientes, where he again accompanied General Paz. He again returned to Montevideo when Paz's scheme to rise against the governor of Montevideo Joaquín Madariaga failed.

He joined the Ejército Grande of Justo José de Urquiza and participated in the Battle of Caseros. After this, having achieved the rank of coronel, he became the leader of the Company of Granaderos of the 2nd Battalion and was also a Congress representative that same year. This group would later become the first battalion of the Second Regiment during the Secession of Buenos Aires. He was also a delegate-elect in 1854 for the sanction of the Constitution of Buenos Aires.
