= Niceto Vega =

Argentine colonel

Niceto Vega (March 19, 1799 - May 23, 1841) was an Argentine colonel. Born in Buenos Aires, he took part in the campaign of José de San Martín to Peru. He fought in the Argentine Civil Wars under the command of the unitarian Juan Lavalle, against the governor Juan Manuel de Rosas.
