= San Justo Department =

San Justo Department may refer to:

- San Justo Department, Córdoba
- San Justo Department, Santa Fe
