= San Carlos Minas =

- Town
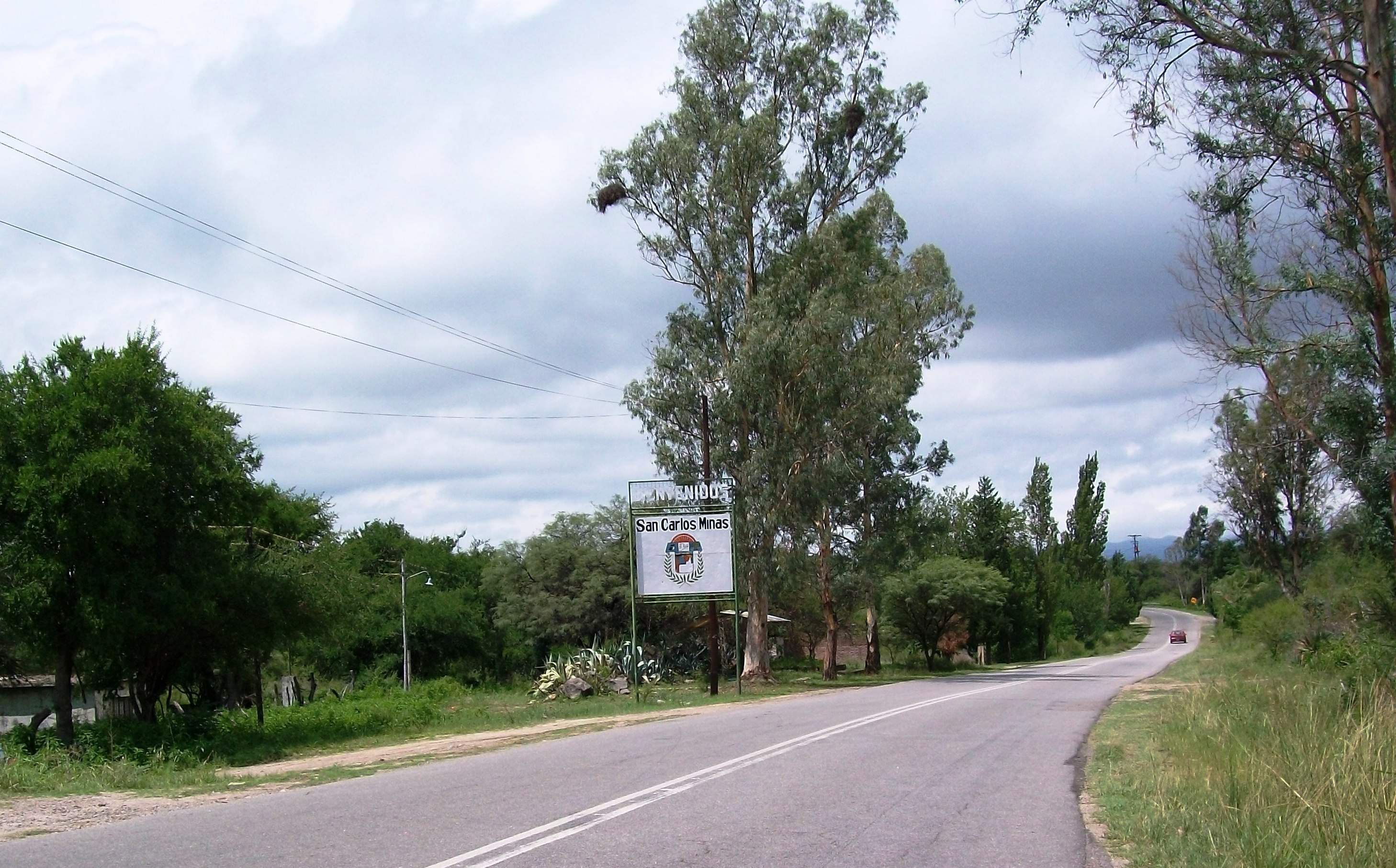
- San Carlos Minas

- Location of San Carlos Minas in Argentina
- Coordinates: 31°11′S 65°05′W
- Country: Argentina
- Province: Córdoba
- Department: Minas

Government
  - Intendant: Walter Romero
- Elevation: 756 m (2,480 ft)

Population
  - Total: 3,200
- Time zone: UTC−3 (ART)
- CPA base: X5291
- Dialing code: +54 3542

San Carlos Minas is a small town in Córdoba Province in Argentina, it is the head town of the Minas Department. It has a population of 2000 people. It was found in 1 of October 1854. San Carlos Minas is near of two rivers Noguinet and Jaime.
