= Quebracho Herrado, Argentina =

Quebracho Herrado
- Location within Córdoba Province Location within Argentina
- Coordinates: 31.55°S 62.225°W
- Country: Argentina
- Province: Córdoba
- Department: San Justo

Government
  - Intendant: Rodolfo Marson

Population (2001)
  - Total: 317
- Time zone: UTC−3 (ART)
- Postal code: X2423
- Area code: 03564

Quebracho Herrado is a small community in San Justo Department of Córdoba Province, Argentina. It was the location of the famous Battle of Quebracho Herrado in 1840 during the civil wars. The town has about 317 inhabitants. It is about 238 kilometres (148 mi) from the city of Córdoba

== Climate ==
The climate is temperate with a dry season, registering an average annual temperature of 25 °C (77 °F). Winter temperatures may fall below 0 °C (32 °F) and summer temperatures may rise above 35 °C (95 °F). Annual rainfall is about 800 millimetres (31 in).

== History ==
In the early nineteenth century, among the grasslands and thorn bushes that covered the interior of Argentina, there was a grove of quebracho trees (Schinopsis lorentzii) beside the cart track linking Córdoba to Santa Fe Province. A horseshoe was nailed to the trunk of the highest, which define the boundary between the provinces of Córdoba and Santa Fe. The name Quebracho Herrado refers to this tree, meaning "shod quebracho".

In 1816 the Buenos Aires government established a fort here, the Fuerte Posta de Quebracho Herrado.

On 28 November 1840, 15 kilometres (9.3 mi) south of the present municipality, the Battle of Quebracho Herrado was fought between a Unitarian army of 4,200 men led by Juan Lavalle and a Federalist army of 6,400 led by the former President of Uruguay Manuel Oribe. The latter were victorious. After the Unitarians took power in Argentina a few years later, the site of the battle was called Campo Lavalle.

== Economy ==
The main economic activity is agriculture followed by livestock raising. The main crops are soybeans and corn. Milk production and tourism are also important in the local economy. The town has a dispensary, a primary school, a police station and a community building in which most of the administrative functions are based.
