= San Justo, Spain =

Municipality in Castile and León

San Justo
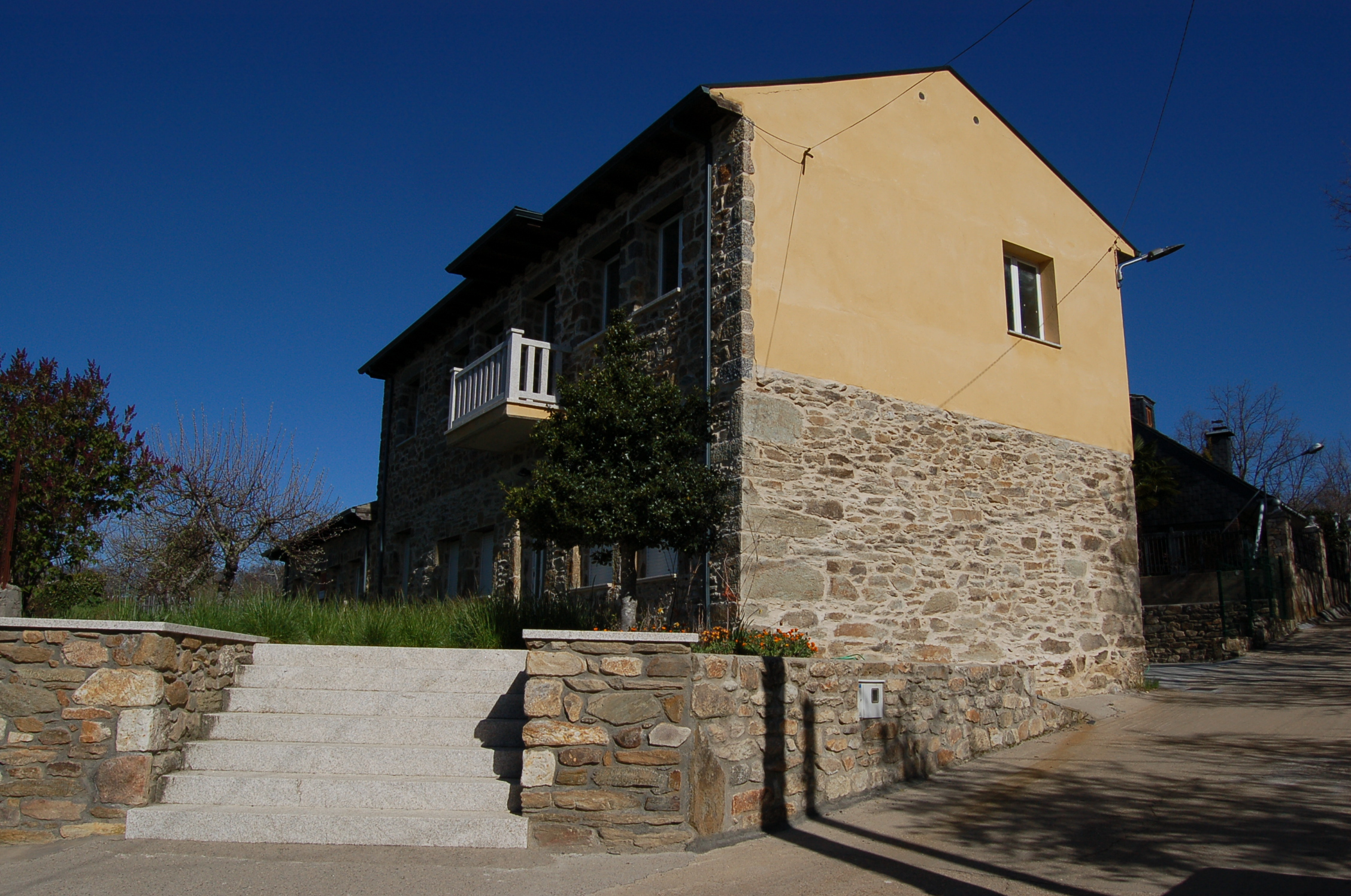

- Flag

- Location within Spain
- Country: Spain
- Autonomous community: Castile and León
- Province: Zamora
- Municipality: San Justo

Area
  - Total: 75.20 km^{2} (29.03 sq mi)

Population (2023)
  - Total: 206
  - Density: 2.74/km^{2} (7.09/sq mi)
- Time zone: UTC+1 (CET)
  - Summer (DST): UTC+2 (CEST)

San Justo is a municipality in the province of Zamora, part of the autonomous community of Castile and León, Spain. It has a population of 206 according to the 2023 Continuous Register.

== See also ==
- Zamora (province)
- Kingdom of León
- Leonese language
