= Plaza Luxardo =

- Villagec
- Interactive map of Plaza Luxardo
- Country: ARG
- Province: Córdoba
- Department: San Justo

Government
  - Communal President: Victor Hugo Burdino (Unidad Patriotica Comunitaria "U.P.C.")
- Elevation: 155.70 m (510.8 ft)

Population
  - Total: 218
- Time zone: UTC−3 (ART)
- Postal code: X2411
- Area code: 03564

Plaza Luxardo is a village located in the San Justo Department, Córdoba, Argentina.

It consists of 218 inhabitants and is located 12 km from San Francisco, the head city of the San Justo Department, and approximately 270 km from the city of Córdoba. It has 66 occupied dwellings.

== Economy ==
The main economic activity is agriculture, followed by livestock raring. The main crops are soybeans and corn. Milk production and tourism are also important in the local economy.

== Facilities ==
There is a clinic in each locality (Plaza Luxardo and Estacion Luxardo), a primary school, a police station and a community building where much of the administrative functions of the village are carried out. There is also a school for adults, a CB Rural (a rural school) in Luxardo Square, a civil registry and an upgraded bus station.

Additionally there are two sports clubs where the village practices sports and hosts social activities - the Luxardo Sports Club in Estacion and the Social Union Club in Plaza Luxardo - each with soccer fields and facilities for meetings and parties.

== Climate ==
The climate is temperate with a dry season, registering an average annual temperature of 25° approximately. In the winter temperatures fall below 0° and above 35 degrees in the summer. The annual rainfall regime is about 800 mm.

== Controversy ==
In 2010 Sergio Gaviglio, former Communal President of the locality, was sentenced to two years in prison for fraud resulting from his allegedly selling state land located on the banks of the Provincial Road. The case originated when complaints were made suggesting the theft of city funds for his own benefit during his tenure, from 2003 to 2007.
