= Marco Avellaneda =

Marco Manuel Avellaneda
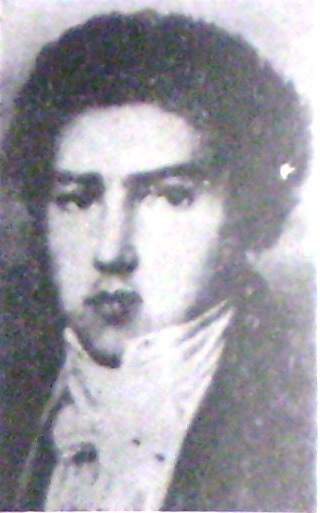
- Born: 18 June 1813; San Fernando del Valle de Catamarca
- Died: 3 October 1841 (aged 28); Metán
- Occupation: Politician
- Known for: Martyrdom

Marco Manuel Avellaneda (18 June 1813 – 3 October 1841) was the governor of Tucumán Province in Argentina, and father of the Argentine President Nicolás Avellaneda. He was executed after an unsuccessful revolt against the Federal government, and his head was displayed on a pike.

== Early years ==
Manuel Marco Avellaneda was born in San Fernando del Valle de Catamarca on 18 June 1813, son of Nicolás Avellaneda y Tula, the first governor of Catamarca Province. He learned to read and write in the Franciscan school of Father Ramon de la Quintana, who taught Latin and rhetoric. In 1823, his parents moved to San Miguel de Tucumán.
Marco Avellaneda won an official scholarship to study at the College of Moral Sciences in Buenos Aires. There he became friends with Juan Bautista Alberdi, Vicente Fidel López, Marcos Paz, Carlos Tejedor and Juan María Gutiérrez. In 1834 he earned his doctorate in Jurisprudence. Even then he stood out as a proficient speaker, and his companions called him "Marco Tulio". He collaborated in those years with the newspaper El amigo del país (The Friend of the country). He wanted to stay in Buenos Aires, but his parents called him back to Tucuman. He had been persecuted for his journalistic activity against Juan Manuel de Rosas.

== Political career ==
Governor Alejandro Heredia honored him with his friendship. Emilio Carilla says that "his career as a public man was a swift rise: solicitor, legislator in 1835, three years later, at age 25, he was president of the House of Representatives of Tucumán. He is credited with a Constitution in 1833.
Alejandro Heredia was murdered in the countryside near San Miguel de Tucumán on 12 November 1838, and Avellaneda was later accused of implication in his death. He had reportedly rode back to Tucumán with the murderers shouting "the tyrant is dead!", and participated in the legislative assembly to choose a successor as governor.

This was the starting point of the regional reaction, the Northern League, against the head of the Confederation. In 1840 the government of Tucumán Province formed a Unitarian coalition of the northwestern provinces along with Salta, La Rioja, Catamarca and Jujuy. They formally withdrew recognition of Rosas as governor and as the authority for managing the external relations of the provinces. Avellaneda was a Minister in the consecutive governments of Bernabé Piedrabuena, of Pedro de Garmendia and of Gregorio Aráoz de Lamadrid.

== Flight and death ==
The Northern League was defeated by Oribe at the Battle of Famaillá on 19 September 1841 and the leaders were captured. Avellaneda escaped on horse, went to San Javier and continued northward, seeking to reach Jujuy Province. But while in an inn, he was betrayed and arrested by Gregorio Sandoval, who had decided to change sides to Rosas. Along with other officers he was delivered to Oribe, who ordered his execution. This took place on 3 October in Metán, in Salta Province. His head was exposed as a warning, stuck on a pike in the center of the Plaza Independencia. Marco Avellaneda was given the nickname of "the Martyr of Metan".
According to tradition, Fortunata García de García took the head at night and it was buried in the convent of San Francisco.

== Gallery ==
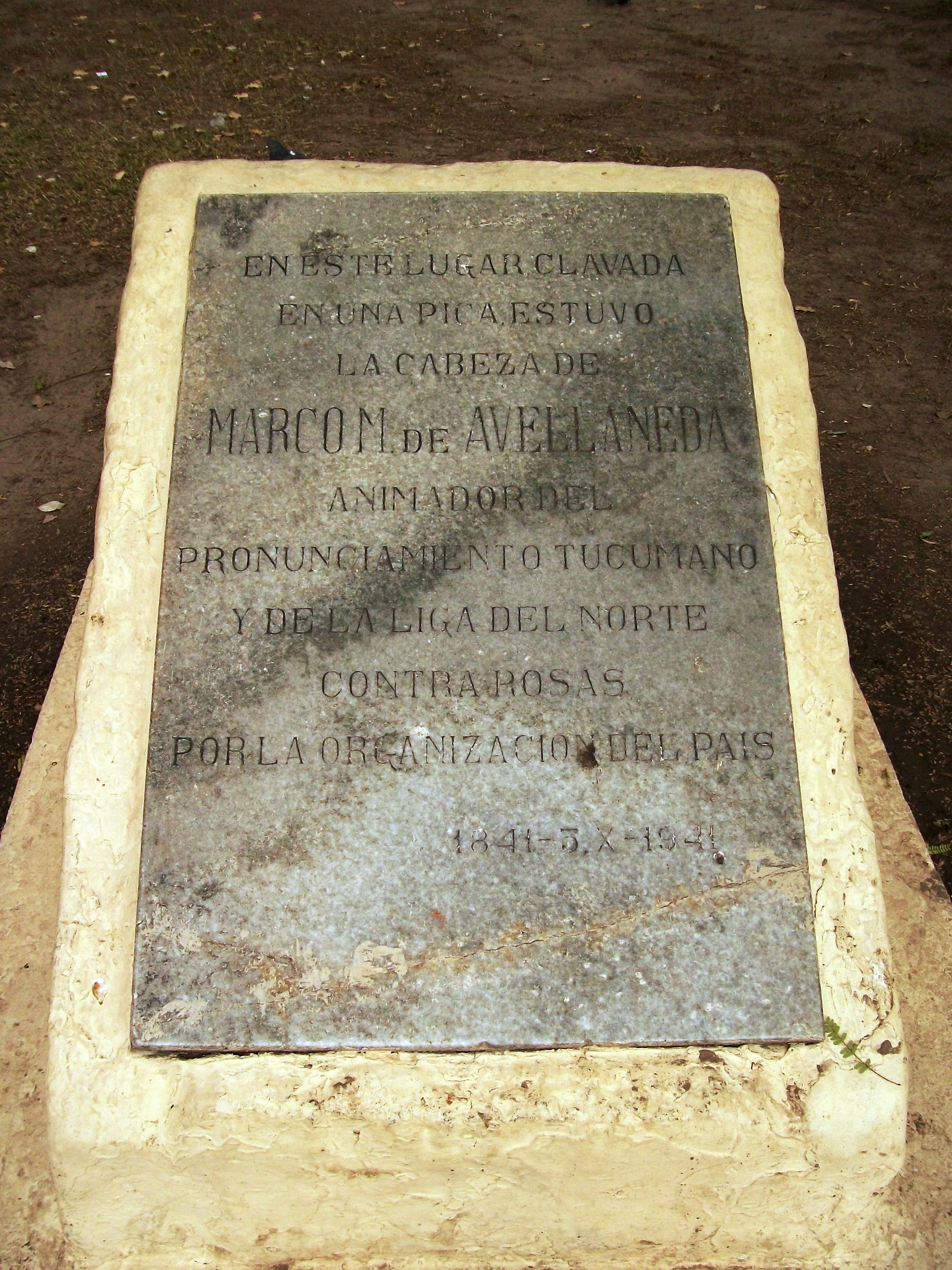
Monument in the place where his head was exhibited

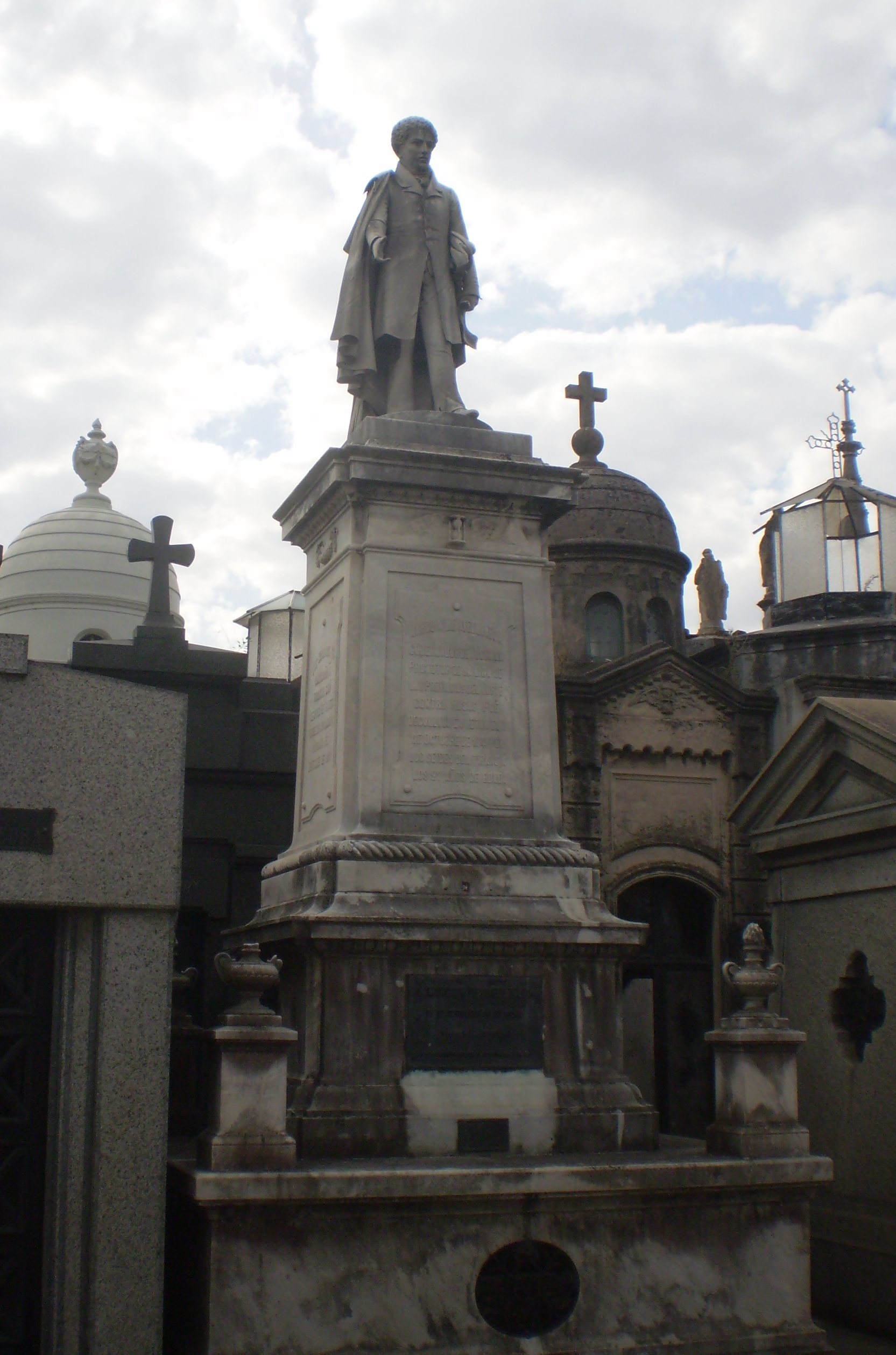
Statue of Marco Avellaneda's tomb in the Recoleta Cemetery
