= Provincial Route 1 (Córdoba) =

Highway in Argentina

Provincial Route 1
- Ruta provincial 1

Route information
- Length: 95 km (59 mi)

Major junctions
- South end: National Route 19 and National Route 158 in San Francisco
- North end: Interprovincial border with Santa Fe (continues as RP 23)

Location
- Country: Argentina

Highway system
- Highways in Argentina

Provincial Route 1 (Spanish: Ruta Provincial 1) is a highway located in the northeast province of Córdoba Province in Argentina. It has a fully paved length of 95 km (59 mi). Provincial Route 1 develops from north to south, beginning its course on the border with the Santa Fe Province and ending in the surroundings of San Francisco, where it continues with National Route 158.
