= Minas Department, Córdoba =

Minas Department Departamento Minas
- Department
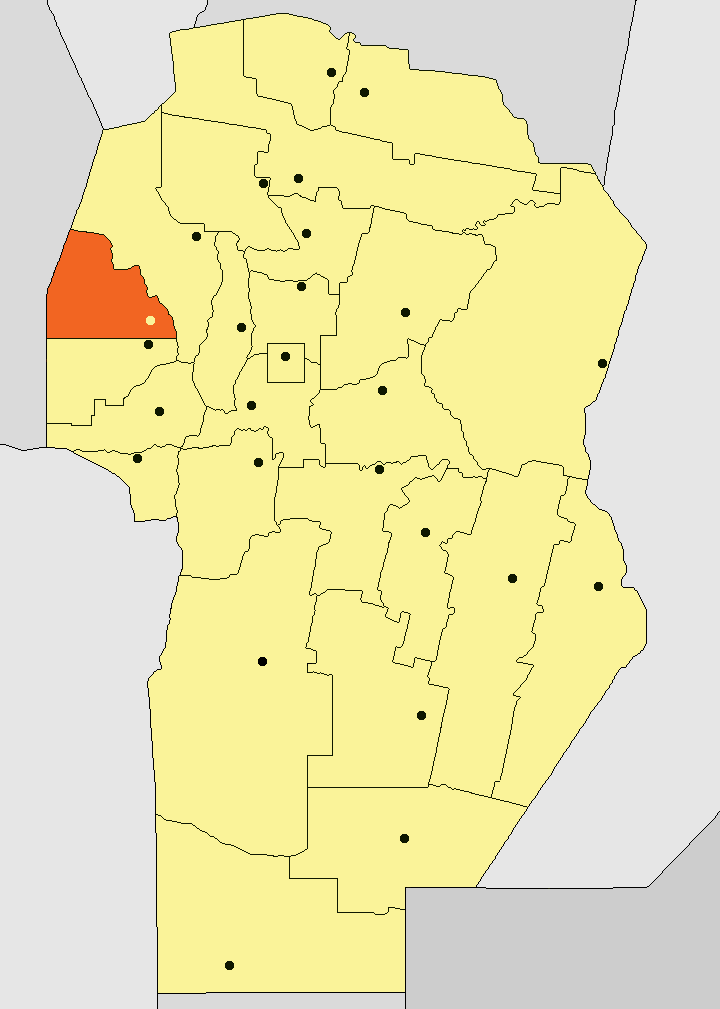
- Location of Minas Department in Córdoba Province
- Coordinates: 31°11′S 65°05′W
- Country: Argentina
- Province: Córdoba
- Capital: San Carlos Minas

Area
  - Total: 3,730 km^{2} (1,440 sq mi)

Population (2001 census [INDEC])
  - Total: 4,881
  - Density: 1.31/km^{2} (3.39/sq mi)
  - Pop. change (1991-2001): +1.69%
- Time zone: UTC-3 (ART)
- Postal code: X5291
- Dialing code: 03542
- Distances to
- Buenos Aires: ?
- Córdoba: 159 km (99 mi)

Minas Department is a department of Córdoba Province in Argentina.

The provincial subdivision has a population of about 4,881 inhabitants in an area of 3,730 km², and its capital city is San Carlos Minas.

== Settlements ==
- Ciénaga del Coro
- El Chacho
- Estancia de Guadalupe
- Guasapampa
- La Playa
- San Carlos Minas
- Talaini
- Tosno
