= Battle of Famaillá =

Coordinates: 27°2′3″S 65°24′37″W

- Part of the Argentine Civil War
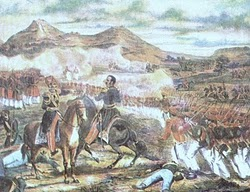
- Detail of a lithography of the battle
Date	September 19, 1841
Location	Famaillá, Tucumán Province
Result	Federal victory

Belligerents
Federal army	Unitarian army

Commanders and leaders
Manuel Oribe	Juan Lavalle

Strength
2,200	2,000

The Battle of Famaillá (Famaillá, Tucumán Province, Argentina, September 19, 1841), was a Federal Party victory, under the command of former Uruguayan president Manuel Oribe, over the army of the Unitarian Party under general Juan Lavalle, during the Argentine Civil War.

== Prelude to the battle ==
After the failure of Lavalle's army to occupy Buenos Aires and its defeat at the Battle of Quebracho Herrado, his army and the one under the command of Gregorio Aráoz de Lamadrid had to abandon Córdoba Province, marching to the northern Argentine provinces. There they formed an alliance known as Coalition of the North, of Unitarian inspiration, which assembled powerful forces in the fight against Juan Manuel de Rosas and his allies.

While Lamadrid formed a new army in Tucumán Province, Lavalle spent several months in a campaign in La Rioja Province, to delay Oribe and to give his ally time to prepare. In order to open new fronts, he sent two divisions, one to Santiago del Estero, which failed without a fight, and another to Cuyo, which was destroyed at the Battle of San Cala.

Lavalle was finally forced to retreat towards Catamarca Province, where he and Lamadrid divided the provinces again: the latter would go to Cuyo to try to raise an insurrection against Rosas, while Lavalle would await a confrontation with Oribe in Tucumán, joining his forces with that province's governor, Marco Avellaneda. Oribe also marched towards Tucumán, wishing to finally resolve the war, while sending general Ángel Pacheco after Lamadrid.

== The battle ==
After trying to avoid the enemy main force in order to buy time to reinforce his army, Lavalle waited for the Federals on the north bank of the Famaillá river, about 40 km (25 mi) south of the provincial capital. Lavalle's forces comprised about 2,000 men, and the federal army about 2,200, after general Eugenio Garzón's, moved out to occupy the city of Tucumán.

The battle started at mid-morning. The Unitarian army included Marco Avellaneda, Juan Esteban Pedernera, Manuel Hornos and other notables. Among the Federals there were Juan Felipe Ibarra, Celedonio Gutiérrez, Hilario Lagos and Mariano Maza. At first it seemed it would last without definition for a long time, but early on it was clear that the veterans of the Federal army easily outclassed Lavalle's soldiers. The victory was in the hands of Oribe, and Lavalle and his men were forced to run away.

== Consequences ==
Avellaneda escaped to the north, but betrayed by his security chief, he would be executed at Metán by orders of Oribe and Maza. Lavalle escaped to San Salvador de Jujuy, where he was killed on a chance encounter with a Federal party. His remains were carried to Potosí, Bolivia, by Pedernera. The latter would have more luck, as he eventually reached the post of vicepresident of the nation, although he was forced to preside on the dissolution of his own government in 1861.

On the Federal side, Gutiérrez would become governor of Tucumán for 10 years; Lagos would become the chief of the Federal party of Buenos Aires after the fall of Rosas, and Oribe would return to his country, Uruguay, to govern for another nine years.

The Battle of Famaillá signaled the end of the Coalition of the North. It was also Lavalle's last battle, and the next to last in the civil war. Only ten days later, Lamadrid was defeated at the Battle of Rodeo del Medio, and the country would be controlled by the Federalist Party, almost without opposition for another ten years.

== Bibliography ==
- "Partes de batalla de las guerras civiles". Academia Nacional de la Historia. 1977.
- Aráoz de Lamadrid, Gregorio (1895). Memorias. Buenos Aires.
- Best, Félix (1980). Historia de las Guerras Argentinas. Buenos Aires: Peuser.
- Beverina, Juan (1923). Las campañas de los ejércitos libertadores 1838-1852. Buenos Aires.
- Páez de la Torre, Carlos (h) (1987). Historia de Tucumán. Buenos Aires: Plus Ultra. ISBN 950-21-0907-4.
- Ruiz Moreno, Isidoro J. (2006). Campañas militares argentinas. Buenos Aires: Emecé. ISBN 950-04-2794-X.
- Saldías, Adolfo (1987). Historia de la Confederación Argentina. Buenos Aires: Hyspamérica.
- Sosa de Newton, Lily (1973). Lavalle. Buenos Aires: Plus Ultra.
- Zinny, Antonio (1987). Historia de los gobernadores de las Provincias Argentinas. Buenos Aires: Hyspamérica. ISBN 950-614-685-3.
- Baldrich, Fernando A. (1977). "Mariano Maza, el implacable represor". Revista Todo es Historia (79).
- Poenitz, Erich (1977). "Los correntinos de Lavalle". Revista Todo es Historia (119).
