= Mollar =

Mollar may refer to:

- Mollar (grape) or Listán negro, a Spanish wine grape varietal
- El Mollar, a settlement in Tucumán Province in northern Argentina
- Mollalar (40° 09' N 46° 52' E), Agdam or Mollar, a village in Azerbaijan

== People with the surname ==
- Max Mollar (1929–1977), Australian rules footballer

== See also ==
- Molar (disambiguation)
