= Tafí del Valle =

Tafí del Valle Taktikllakta
- City
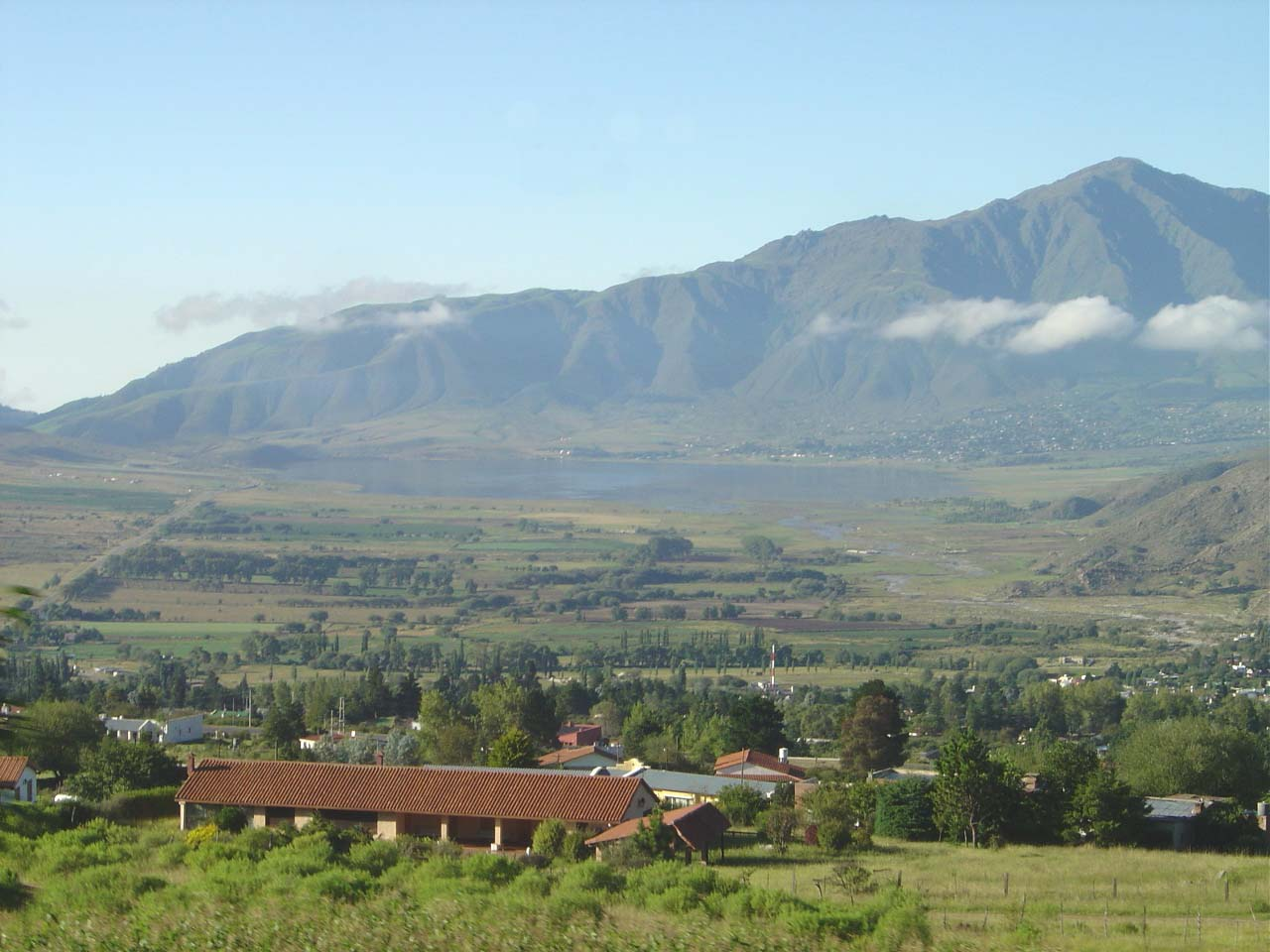
- Tafí del Valle
- Interactive map of Tafí del Valle
- Coordinates: 26°51′10″S 65°42′30″W
- Country: Argentina
- Province: Tucumán
- Department: Tafí del Valle

Government
  - Intendant: Francisco Caliva (PJ)

Area
  - Total: 150 km^{2} (58 sq mi)
- Elevation: 2,014 m (6,608 ft)

Population (2010 census)
  - Total: 14,933
  - Density: 100/km^{2} (260/sq mi)
- Demonym: tafinisto/tafinista
- Time zone: UTC−3 (ART)
- Postal code: 4137
- Area code: 03867
- Website: https://tafidelvalle.gob.ar/

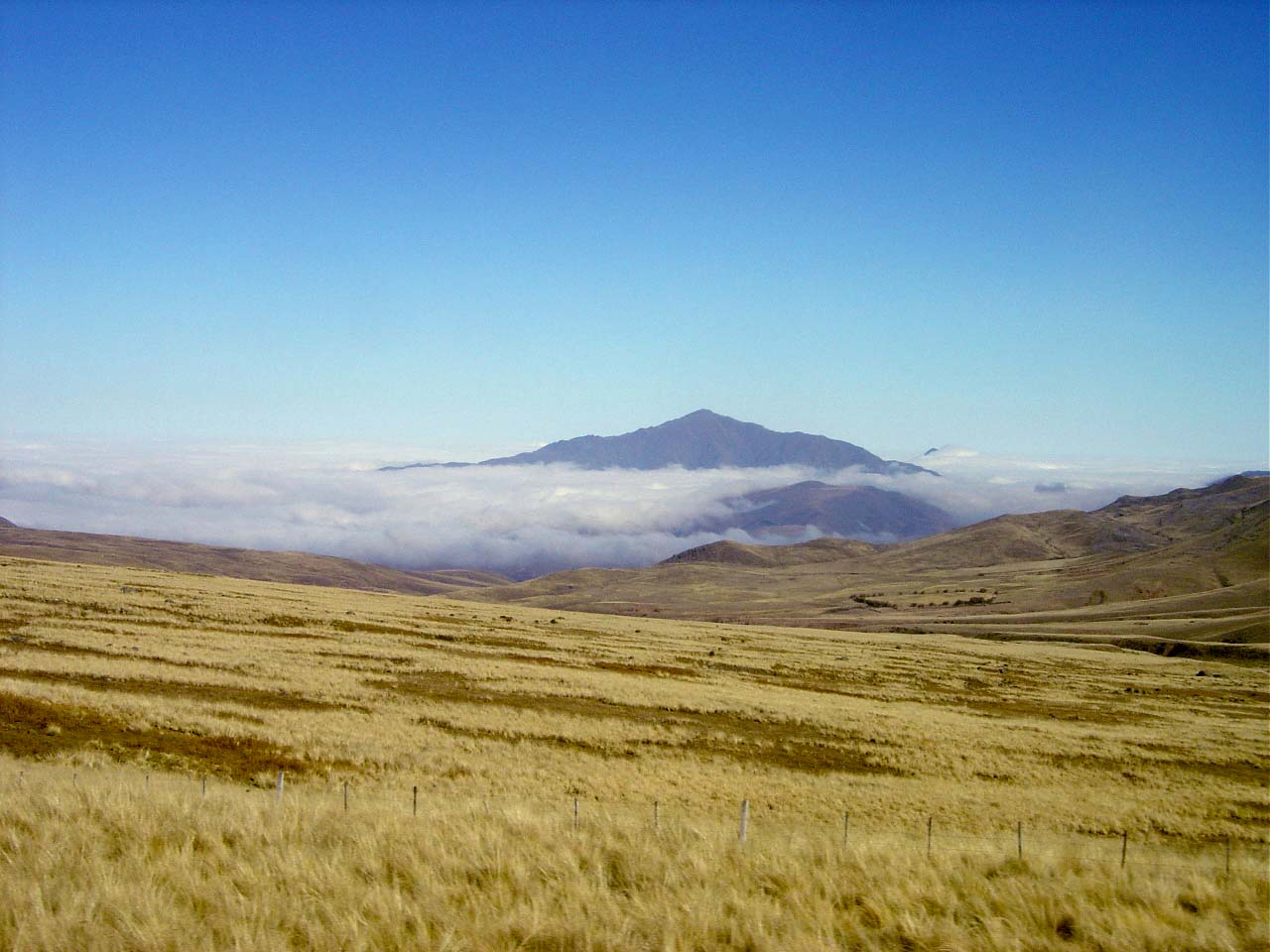
Tafí del Valle (Tucumán): View from El Infiernillo

Tafí del Valle is a city in Tucumán, Argentina. It is located in the department of the same name, of which it is the main settlement, in the west of the Argentine province of Tucumán, 126 km from the provincial capital, San Miguel de Tucumán.

== Toponymy ==
Taktikllakta (Cacán language: "Town of the magnificent entrance") seems to have been the original name of the population centre and of the valley in which it lies. The Spaniards simplified the name as Tafí. It should be borne in mind that Tucumán province contains another town with the name Tafí, viz. Tafí Viejo.

== Geography ==
The town of Tafí del Valle is located almost in the centre of the Tafí valley, which separates the high cordilleras of the Sierra del Aconquija to the south, and the Cumbres Calchaquíes to the north. This valley forms an important pass linking the Calchaquí Valleys to the west with the great Chaco-Pampean plains to the east.

There is road access to the city of San Miguel de Tucumán by National Route 38 and Provincial Route 307.

=== Earthquakes ===
Earthquakes in the area of Tucumán province (north-central Argentina) are frequent but mostly of low intensity. Moderate to severe earthquakes occur at approximately 30-year intervals. Among the most notable earthquakes to affect the region were those of 1861 and 1931.

Civil Defence measures include:

- an annual earthquake drill,
- distribution of, and training around, a Manual of Disaster Procedures", ensuring that the media of communication are always provided with generator, facilities and transmission tower,
- signs to warn that this is an earthquake-prone area.

=== Climate and ecology ===
Owing to the altitude, the prevailing climate is temperate with low humidity and winter snowfalls. The eastern part of the valley, where the town lies, is moist and consists of grassland with groves of conifers, deciduous trees and pepper trees. Further west there is less moisture, favouring the presence of scattered cacti such as the cardón. The contrast is particularly marked at Abra del Infiernillo, where just to the west one sees semideserts and deserts, while to the east lie grasslands, woods and forests often covered in cloud.

The average maximum temperature in the town of Tafí in summer (January) is 26C, while in winter (July) it's 16C, and temperatures down to -20C are common in the winter.

Climate data for Tafí del Valle (1936–1972)
Month	Jan	Feb	Mar	Apr	May	Jun	Jul	Aug	Sep	Oct	Nov	Dec	Year
Mean daily maximum °C (°F)	23.5 (74.3)	23.1 (73.6)	21.2 (70.2)	19.4 (66.9)	17.1 (62.8)	16.1 (61.0)	14.9 (58.8)	17.1 (62.8)	18.0 (64.4)	20.0 (68.0)	22.0 (71.6)	23.1 (73.6)	19.6 (67.3)
Daily mean °C (°F)	18.2 (64.8)	17.0 (62.6)	15.6 (60.1)	12.8 (55.0)	10.8 (51.4)	8.9 (48.0)	8.1 (46.6)	10.0 (50.0)	11.3 (52.3)	15.0 (59.0)	16.0 (60.8)	17.5 (63.5)	13.4 (56.1)
Mean daily minimum °C (°F)	13.3 (55.9)	12.8 (55.0)	11.2 (52.2)	7.5 (45.5)	4.2 (39.6)	1.9 (35.4)	1.1 (34.0)	2.4 (36.3)	5.1 (41.2)	7.8 (46.0)	10.8 (51.4)	12.4 (54.3)	7.5 (45.5)
Average precipitation mm (inches)	98.9 (3.89)	78.1 (3.07)	51.5 (2.03)	14.2 (0.56)	4.5 (0.18)	2.3 (0.09)	4.7 (0.19)	4.9 (0.19)	7.9 (0.31)	25.1 (0.99)	52.8 (2.08)	72.6 (2.86)	417.5 (16.44)
Average relative humidity (%)	70	72	70	65	59	57	53	49	48	54	59	66	60
Source: Secretaria de Mineria

== History ==
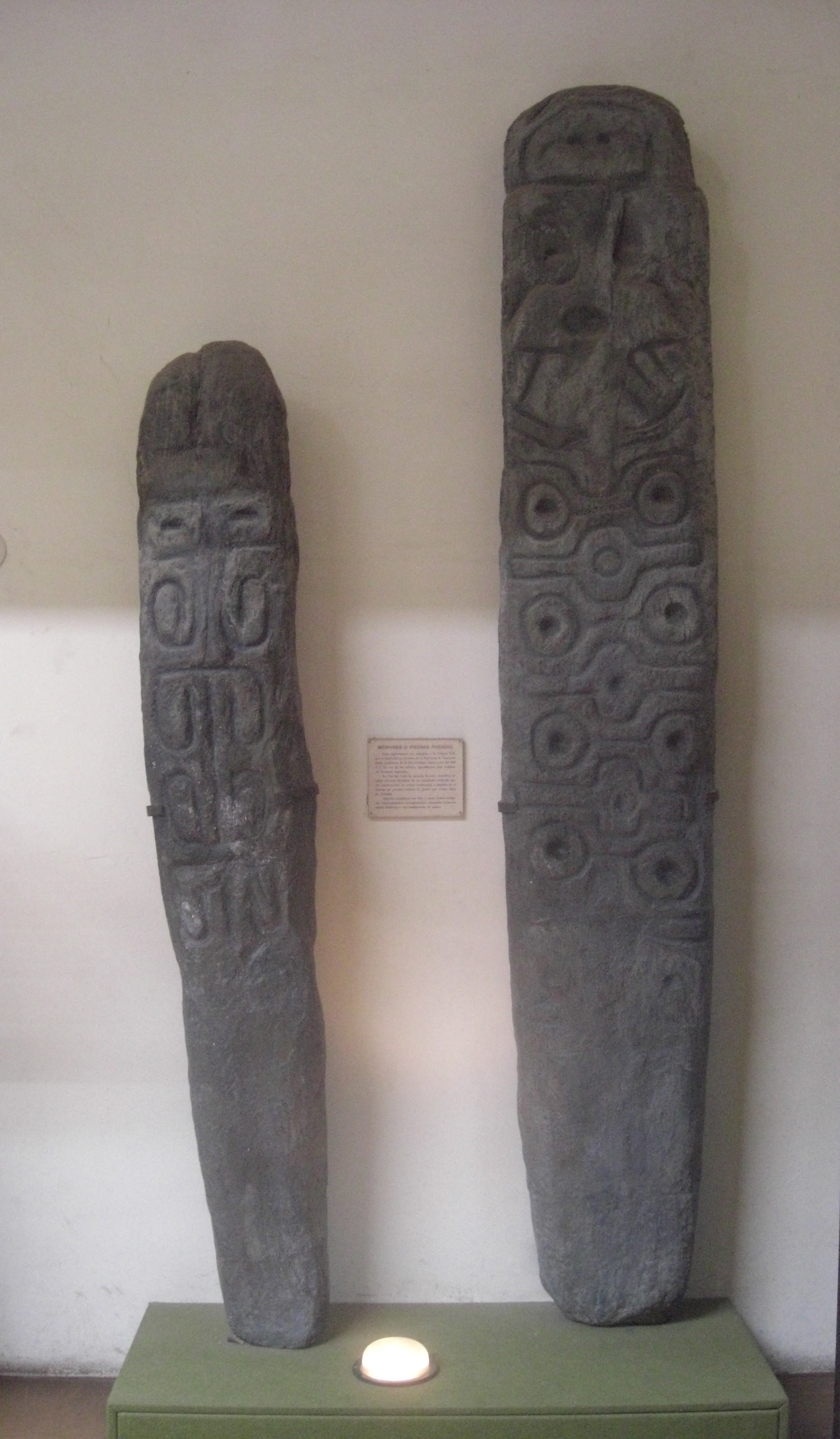
Menhir, Tafí culture, Museo de La Plata

There have been native peoples in the area for over 7,000 years. Villages of farmers and gatherers were established 2,300 years ago, probably predating the Tafí culture.

The Spanish presence began in the mid-16th century. However, the Spanish were unable to establish themselves immediately, due to the resistance mounted by the native Diaguitas and in particular by the Calchaquí tribe.

In 1636 the valley was granted as a royal gift (Sp: Merced Real) to the Spanish family of Leguizamo y Guevara, who founded an estancia (large rural estate). This was later bought by the Jesuits, who had been present in the area since 1617. The Jesuits introduced dairy farming, in particular the production of high-quality cheese.

== Economy ==
The climate has favoured livestock farming, initially with camelids, and since the Spanish influx in the 16th century also with cattle, sheep, horses, and to a lesser extent goats. There is also cultivation of grain crops such as wheat, and vegetables such as lettuce. High-quality varieties of cheese are produced. The second half of the 20th century has seen development of tourism.

== Tourism ==
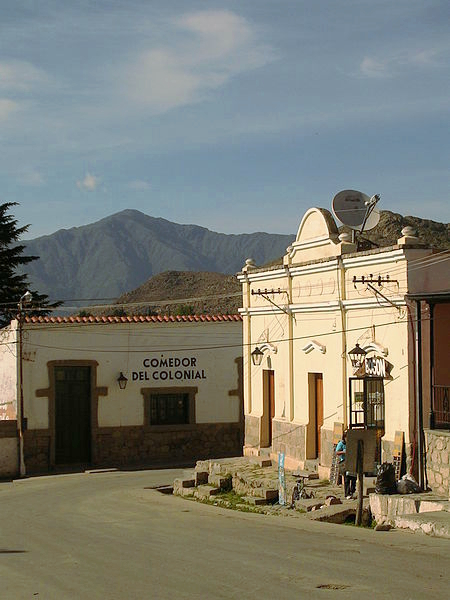
Tafí del Valle

From 2003, this area has begun to be included in international package tours of northwest Argentina.

The RP307 route from San Miguel de Tucumán to Tafí goes into the Tucumán forest and passes through the Quebrada de los Sosa nature reserve. It passes three places of interest: the "El Indio" monument, "The Freezer" and "The End of the World".

At the eastern entrance to the Tafí valley is the village of El Mollar, which possesses a variety of tourist facilities, as also does the town of Tafí del Valle.

One of the main tourist attractions is the collection of menhirs at the Parque de los Menhires close to El Mollar. These phallic monoliths, some of them bearing still visible carvings, were shaped by the indigenous people of the Tafí culture. Originally they stood at different locations throughout the valley, but under the provincial governorship of Antonio Domingo Bussi they were brought together at their present location, in order, it was said, to preserve them and protect them from damage by visitors.

Very close to El Mollar, and extending towards Tafí del Valle, is the artificial lake of Angostura. In addition to its setting among often snow-capped mountains, it offers attractions in the form of fishing and water sports. From this lake issues the fast-flowing and clear Los Sosa river, which flows eastward through canyons and over waterfalls.

Less than 1 km from Tafí is located the Jesuit centre of La Banda (built early 18th century, now a museum) and the hill of Ñuñorco Grande. On Provincial Route 307, 2 km from the town, is the Casa Duende museum, dedicated to local beliefs, myths and traditions.

Continuing to the north, there are panoramic views over the valley, and this route leads to Amaicha del Valle, the ruins of Quilmes, El Pichao, Colalao del Valle and Cafayate - the last-named is within the province of Salta and is well known for its high quality wines.

Activities available at Tafí include horse riding, tours in 4x4 vehicles, trekking, windsurfing, paragliding and visits to churches and estancias.

=== Annual events ===
- A re-enactment of the Passion of Christ during Holy Week, with local actors, attracting a larger number of spectators each year.
- In summer, a tournament of the Argentine national sport of pato (an equestrian sport), involving sportsmen from all over the country.
- The National Cheese Festival, held in February.

== Population ==
In 2001 the town of Tafí del Valle contained approximately 5,000 inhabitants, but in its role as departmental capital the quoted population includes that of settlements within approximately 15 km.

== Gastronomy ==
The cheeses of Tafí, produced since the 18th century, are said to be of excellent quality. Also noted is the cottage cheese (quesillo) and a variety of preparations based on it, such as a dessert dish made with honey or cayote preserve; these may be served with kiwifruit or grapes. Other dishes available include roast meat – beef or kid – and especially grilled trout from the nearby lake, seasoned with lemon. Beverages include white Torrontés wine, made in the neighbouring Calchaquí valleys, and beer brewed in San Miguel de Tucumán.
