= Famaillá Department =

Famaillá Department may refer to:

- Famaillá Department, Tucumán, Argentina
- Famatina Department, Argentina
