= Tafí del Valle Department =

Tafí del Valle
- Department
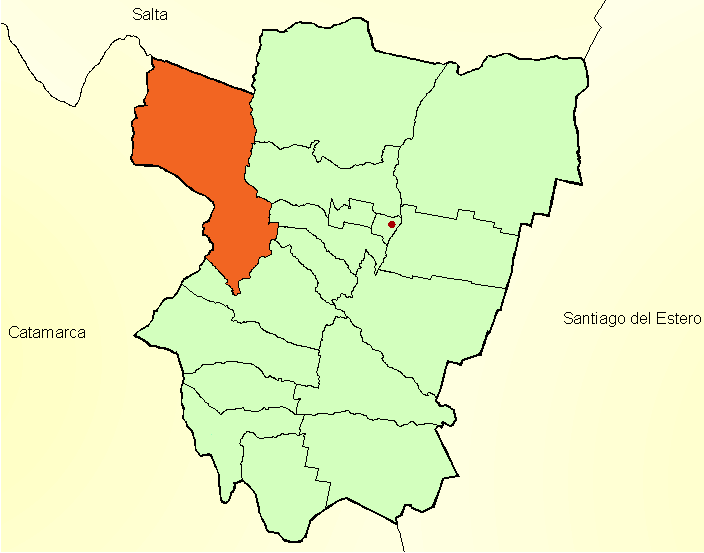
- Location of Tafí del Valle Department in Tucumán Province.
- Coordinates: 26°50′47″S 65°42′32″W
- Country: Argentina
- Province: Tucumán
- Seat: Tafí del Valle

Area
  - Total: 2,741 km^{2} (1,058 sq mi)

Population
  - Total: 13,883

Tafí del Valle Department is a department in Tucumán Province, Argentina. It has a population of 13,883 (2001) and an area of 2,741 km². The seat of the department is in Tafí del Valle.

== Municipalities and communes ==
- Amaicha del Valle
- Colalao del Valle
- El Mollar
- Tafí del Valle
