= Leales Department =

Coordinates: 27°01′58″S 65°18′26″W

Leales
- Department
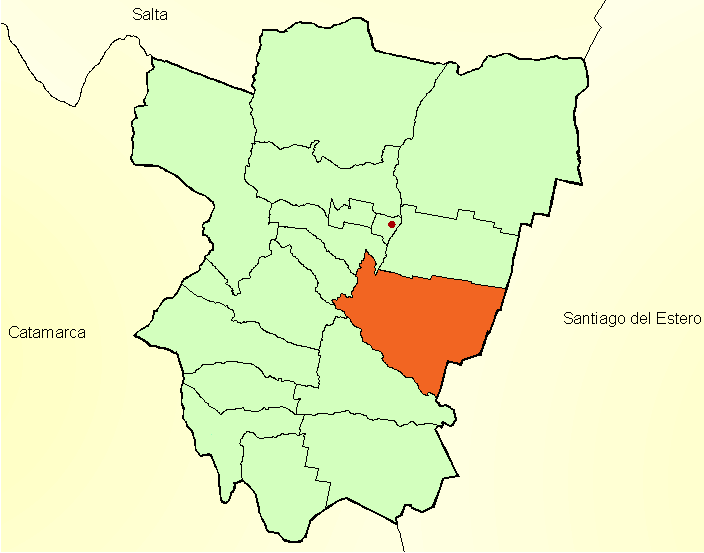
- Location of Leales Department in Tucumán Province.
- Country: Argentina
- Province: Tucumán

Area
  - Total: 2,027 km^{2} (783 sq mi)

Population (2022)
  - Total: 66,392

Leales Department is a department in Tucumán Province, Argentina. It has a population of 51,090 (2001) and an area of 2027 km². The seat of the department is in Bella Vista.

== Municipalities and communes ==
- Agua Dulce y La Soledad
- Bella Vista
- El Mojón
- Esquina y Mancopa
- Estación Araoz y Tacanas
- Ingenio Leales
- La Encantada
- Las Talas
- Los Gómez
- Los Puestos
- Manuel García Fernández
- Quilmes y Los Sueldos
- Río Colorado
- Santa Rosa de Leales
- Villa de Leales
- Villa Fiad

== Notes ==
This article includes content from the Spanish Wikipedia article Departamento Leales.
