= Famaillá Department, Tucumán =

Famaillá Department, Tucumán Famaillá
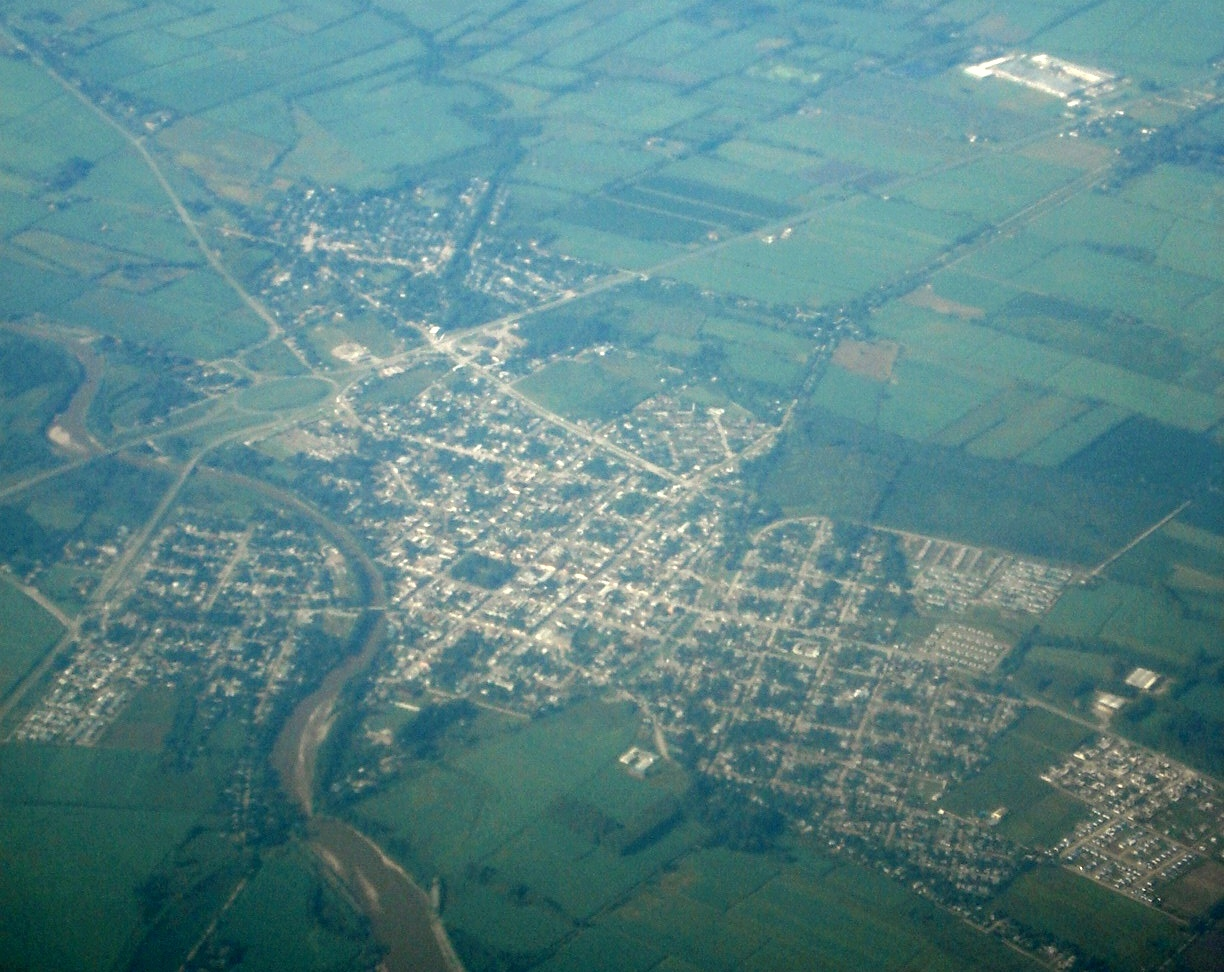
- Aerial view of the city

- Tucumán Province

Government
- Elevation: 750 m (2,460 ft)

Population (2022)
  - Total: 42,702
- Demonym: Famaillense
- Postal code: 4132
- Area code: 03863
- Website: https://web.archive.org/web/20120802042406/http://famailla.gov.ar/

Famaillá Department is a department located in the center-west of the Tucumán Province, Argentina. Its 2001 population was 30,951, mainly located in the east. The department's economic base is agriculture. The National Agricultural Technology Institute (Spanish: Instituto Nacional de Tecnología Agropecuaria), commonly known as INTA, has one of its experimental stations in the area. The department seat is the city of Famaillá.

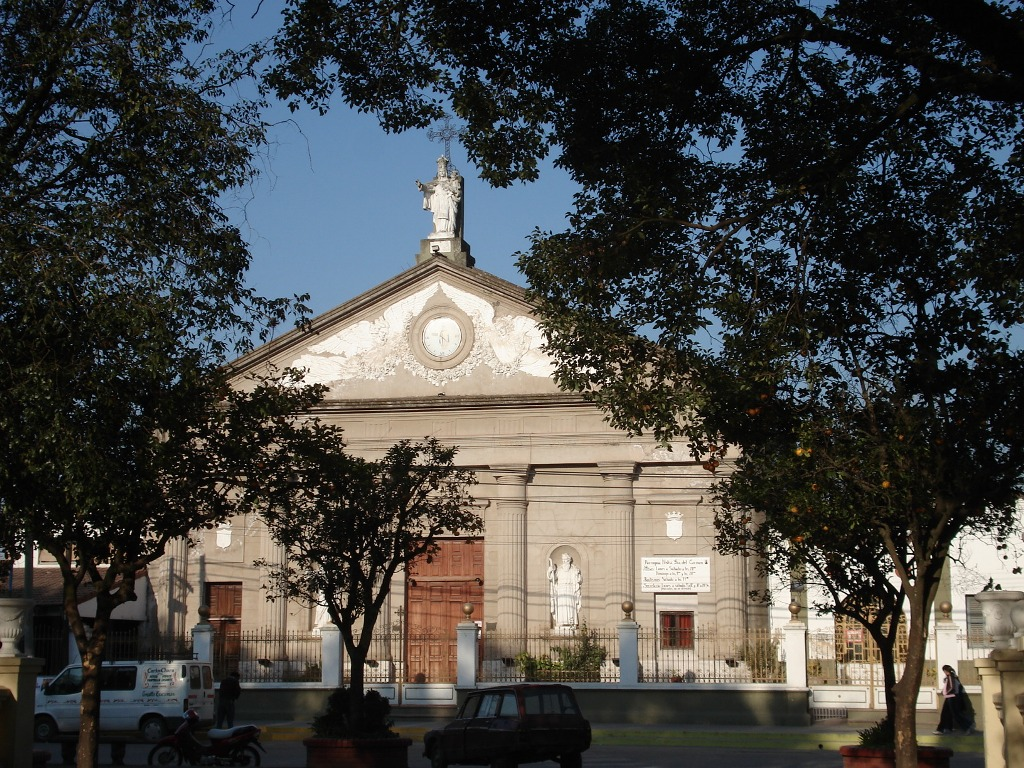
Our Lady of Carmen Church

== Geography ==
The Aconquija Range lies across its west portion whereas the plains extend toward the east. The Famaillá (central area), Colorado (north), and Caspichango (south) rivers are the most important waterways, the latter two forming the department's natural boundaries with Lules, Leales and Monteros departments. Famaillá has a total area of 427 km^{2}.

=== Adjacent departments ===
- Lules Department – north
- Leales Department – east
- Monteros Department – south and southwest
- Tafí del Valle Department – west

== Transportation infrastructure ==
=== Major highways ===
- National Route 38
- Tucuman Province Routes: 301 and 324
