= Villa de Leales =

- Location within Argentina
- Coordinates: 27°12′S 65°18′W
- Country: Argentina
- Province: Tucumán Province
- Department: Leales Department
- Time zone: UTC−3 (ART)

Villa de Leales is a settlement in Tucumán Province in northern Argentina. It has approximately 3,000 inhabitants. It has a 225-year-old church and a castle on the banks of the river dating to around 1890. There are many different businesses in Villa de Leales, including hotels, cinemas, locksmiths, masonry, and restaurants among other businesses.
