= Famaillá =

- City
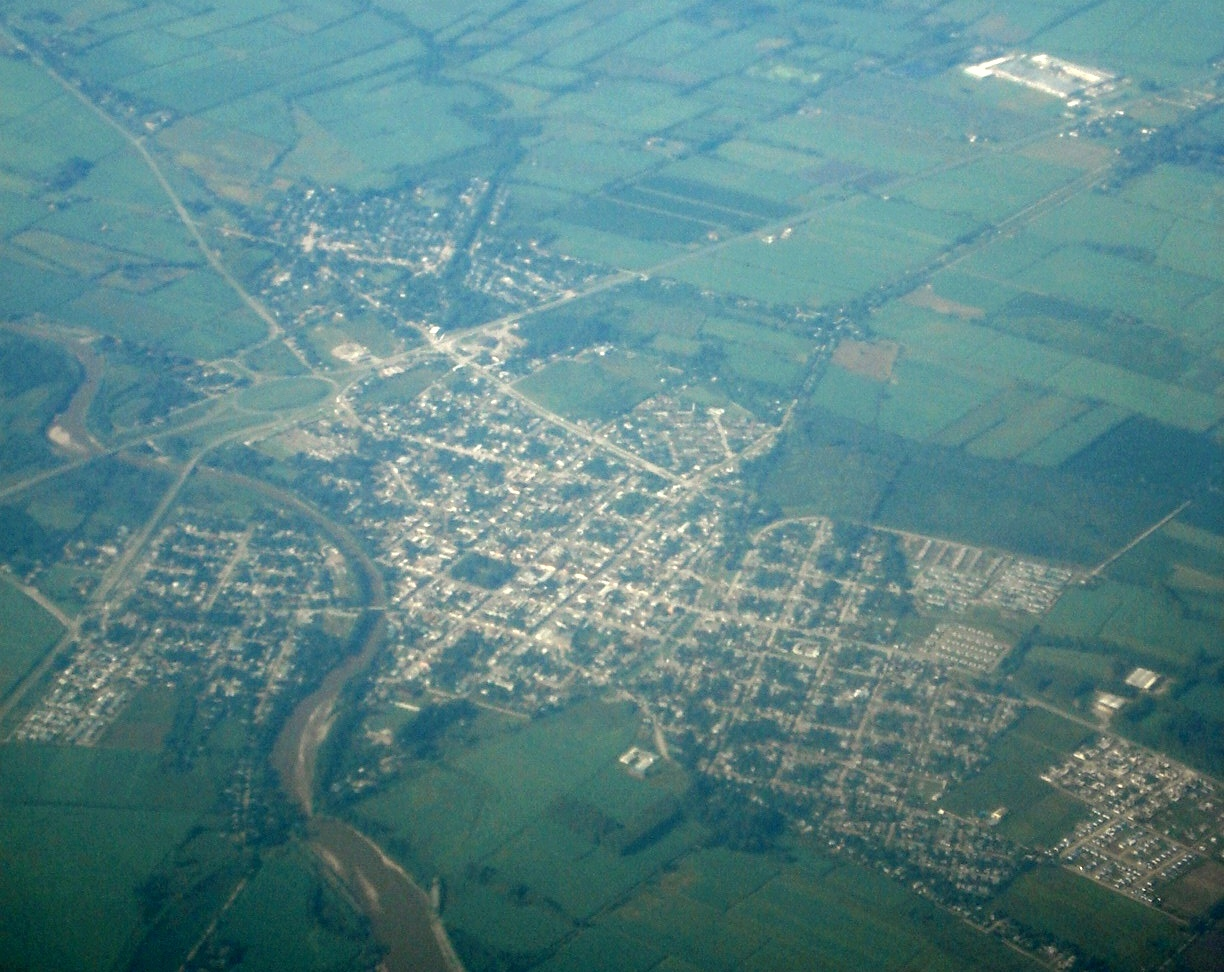
- Aerial view of Famaillá

- Location of Famaillá in Argentina
- Coordinates: 27°03′S 65°24′W
- Country: Argentina
- Province: Tucumán
- Department: Famaillá

Government
  - Intendant: José Orellana (PJ)
- Elevation: 750 m (2,460 ft)

Population (2010 census)
  - Total: 22,924
- Time zone: UTC−3 (ART)
- CPA base: T4132
- Dialing code: +54 3863
- Website: Official website

Famaillá is a city in the province of Tucumán, Argentina, located 30 km south from the provincial capital San Miguel de Tucumán. It has 22,924 inhabitants as per the 2010 census [INDEC], and is the head town of the Famaillá Department.

The city is called the "National Capital of the Empanada". It hosts a festival dedicated to it every September.

The area hosts an experimental agricultural station of the National Institute of Agro-Technology (Instituto Nacional de Tecnología Agropecuaria, INTA). Its economy is based on exports of sugar and strawberry.

Famaillá was the site of the during the Argentine Civil War's Battle of Monte Grande in 1841, between the forces loyal to Juan Manuel de Rosas commanded by Manuel Oribe and the League of the North, led by Juan Lavalle.
