= El Mollar =

- City
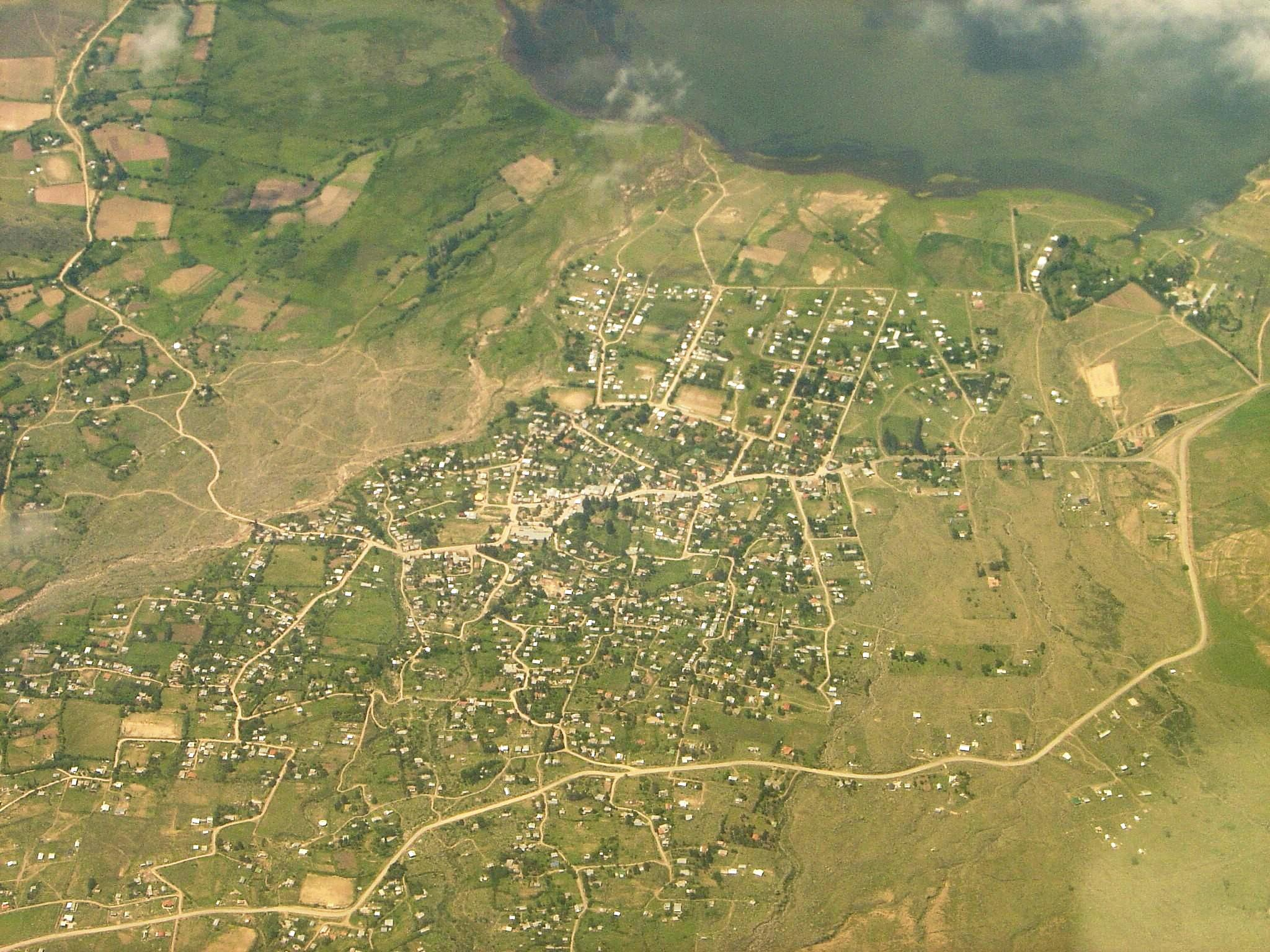
- Aerial view of El Mollar
- Interactive map of El Mollar
- Coordinates: 26°57′00″S 65°43′00″W
- Country: Argentina
- Province: Tucumán
- Department: Tafí del Valle

Government
  - Comisionado: Jorge A. Cruz
- Elevation: 2,137 m (7,011 ft)

Population (2001)
  - Total: 3,795
- Time zone: UTC−3 (ART)
- Postal code: T4135
- Area code: 03867

El Mollar is a settlement in Tucumán Province in northern Argentina.

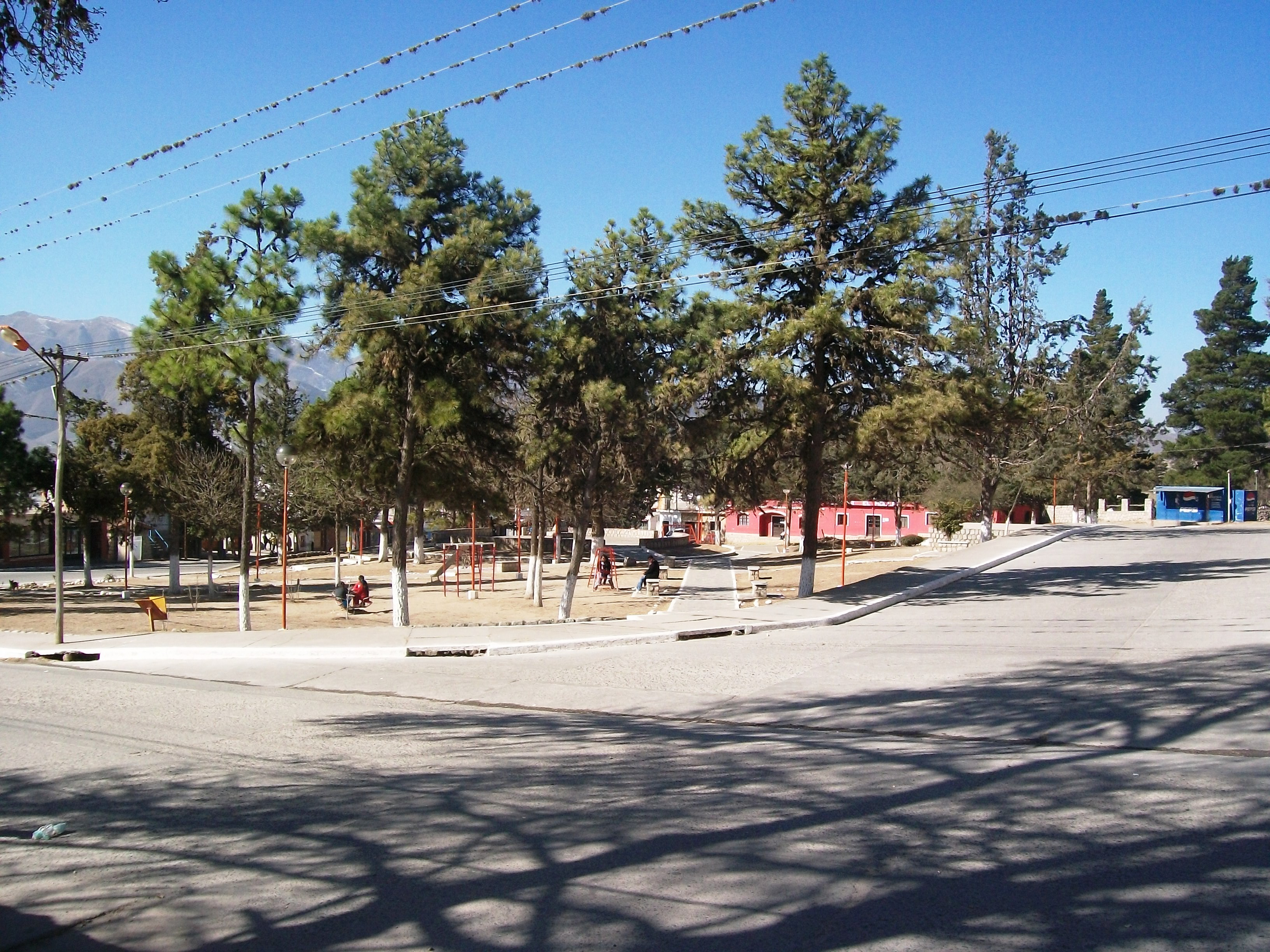
Central Plaza, opposite the "Los Menhires" Archeological Reserve

The locality and rural community of El Mollar is located in the Tafí del Valle Department, in the west of the Argentine province of Tucumán. It is 103 km from the provincial capital, San Miguel de Tucumán by Provincial Route 307, which joins National Route 38 at Acheral.

== Toponymy ==
“El Mollar” is a Quechua name deriving from ”molle” (pepper tree), a variety of tree that grows in the locality.

== Geography ==
The settlement of El Mollar is located almost in the centre of the Tafí valley, beneath the slopes of the Cerro Ñuñorco hill, and beside the artificial lake of Angostura. Since the opening of the road in the 1940s, it has grown rapidly, like the whole of the Tafí valley and the Calchaquí Valleys.

One of the main characteristics of the area is the presence of archeological relics of the ancient Tafí culture (300 BC – 800 AD), part of the Diaguita or Santamaria culture. These include mortars, cairns, and menhirs. These menhirs, according to archaeologists, could have been used as astronomical measuring instruments, solar clocks, or as a symbol of some social or religious hierarchy. These phallic monoliths, some of them bearing still visible carvings, originally stood at different locations throughout the valley, but under the 1976 - 1983 military dictatorship they were brought together at their present location in the Parque de los Menhires, close to the village. This was in order, it was said, to preserve them and protect them from damage by visitors. They measure up to reach 3m in height and 60 cm breadth, and on some of them one face bears carvings with symbolic designs, snakes and human figures.

In 1960 the image of the Virgin of Covadonga was brought from Spain, and is now worshipped in a picturesque chapel.

Very close to El Mollar, and extending towards Tafí del Valle, is the artificial lake of Angostura. In addition to its setting among often snow-capped mountains, it offers attractions in the form of fishing and water sports.

The "Feast of Vegetation” is celebrated every January.

== Earthquakes ==
Earthquakes in the area of Tucumán province (north-central Argentina) are frequent but mostly of low intensity. Moderate to severe earthquakes occur at approximately 30-year intervals. Among the most notable earthquakes to affect the region were those of 1861 and 1931.

== See also ==
- Tafí del Valle
