= Santa Rosa de Leales =

Coordinates: 27°09′S 65°15′W

- Interactive map of Santa Rosa de Leales
- Country: Argentina
- Province: Tucumán Province
- Time zone: UTC−3 (ART)

Santa Rosa de Leales is a settlement in Tucumán Province in northern Argentina.
