= Amaicha del Valle =

Coordinates: 26°36′S 65°55′W

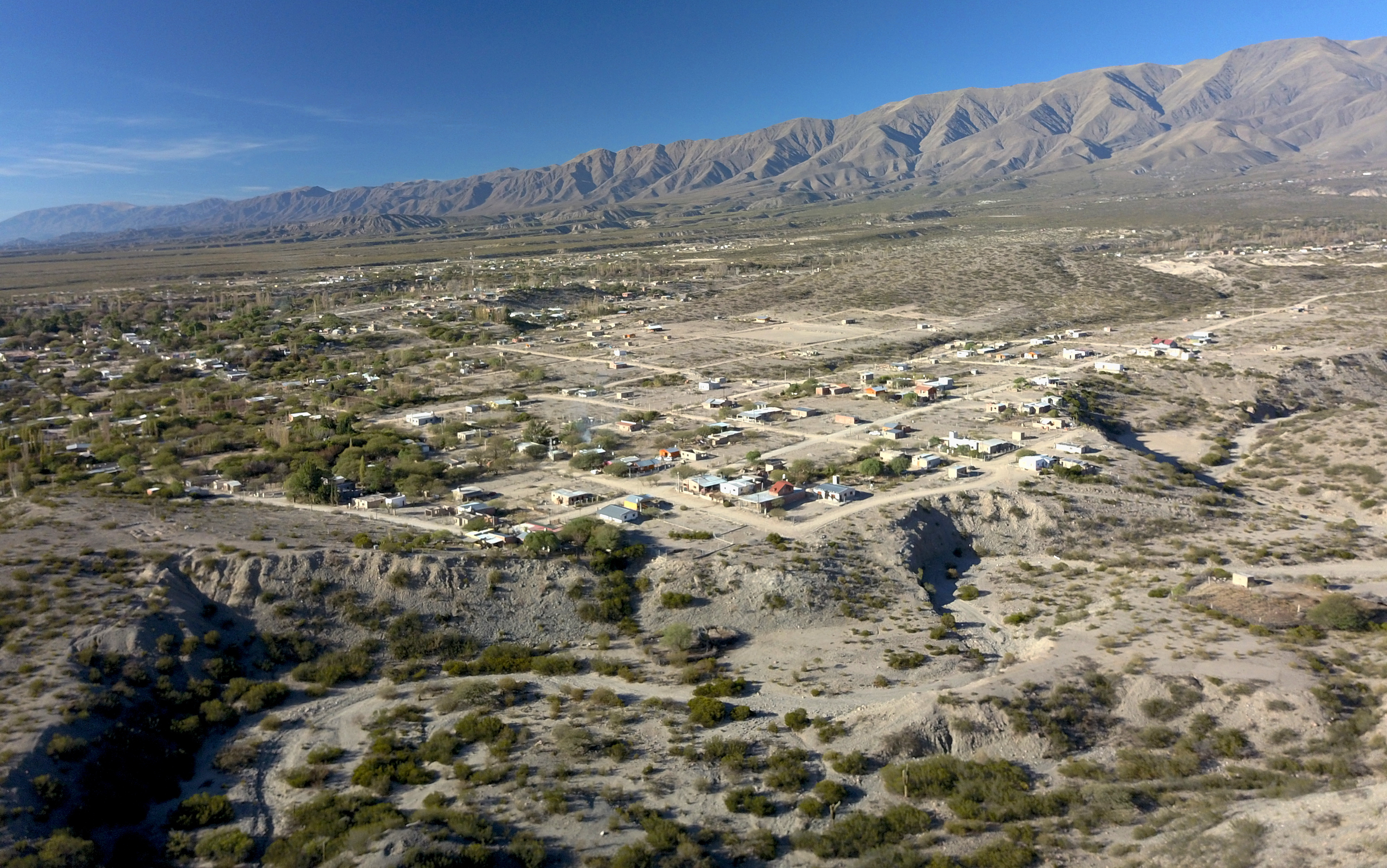

- Country: Argentina
- Province: Tucumán Province

Population (2001)
  - Total: 3,214
- Time zone: UTC−3 (ART)
- Postal code: 4137
- Area code: 03892

Amaicha del Valle is a settlement in Tucumán Province in northern Argentina. It is located in the Tafí del Valle department, in the northwestern province of Tucumán, Argentina, 164 km from the provincial capital, San Miguel de Tucumán and 57 km from the departmental capital, Tafí del Valle.

It communicates with the city of San Miguel de Tucumán by the Ruta Nacional 38 and Route 307. It lies east of the RN 40, from which it is accessed in two ways: on the north by RP 357 (14 km), or from the south via Route 307 from the town of Santa María, Catamarca (20 km).

== Geography ==
It is located in the area corresponding to the province of Tucuman Valles Calchaquíes, at a height of 2000 m.

== Climate ==
Climate data for Amaicha del Valle (1944–1976)
Month	Jan	Feb	Mar	Apr	May	Jun	Jul	Aug	Sep	Oct	Nov	Dec	Year
Mean daily maximum °C (°F)	31.2 (88.2)	29.9 (85.8)	29.2 (84.6)	27.9 (82.2)	25.8 (78.4)	25.5 (77.9)	24.7 (76.5)	26.7 (80.1)	28.9 (84.0)	30.6 (87.1)	31.0 (87.8)	31.1 (88.0)	28.5 (83.3)
Daily mean °C (°F)	20.2 (68.4)	19.7 (67.5)	18.4 (65.1)	14.9 (58.8)	12.9 (55.2)	10.2 (50.4)	8.9 (48.0)	11.4 (52.5)	14.1 (57.4)	17.5 (63.5)	19.0 (66.2)	20.0 (68.0)	15.6 (60.1)
Mean daily minimum °C (°F)	12.3 (54.1)	12.0 (53.6)	10.0 (50.0)	7.0 (44.6)	3.6 (38.5)	1.0 (33.8)	0.0 (32.0)	2.1 (35.8)	4.0 (39.2)	7.1 (44.8)	11.0 (51.8)	12.0 (53.6)	6.8 (44.2)
Average precipitation mm (inches)	48.0 (1.89)	38.4 (1.51)	14.8 (0.58)	1.7 (0.07)	0.5 (0.02)	0.5 (0.02)	0.2 (0.01)	0.4 (0.02)	1.8 (0.07)	5.5 (0.22)	17.3 (0.68)	31.0 (1.22)	160.1 (6.30)
Average relative humidity (%)	66	67	67	65	53	48	45	44	46	51	54	64	56
Source: Secretaria de Mineria

== Photo gallery ==
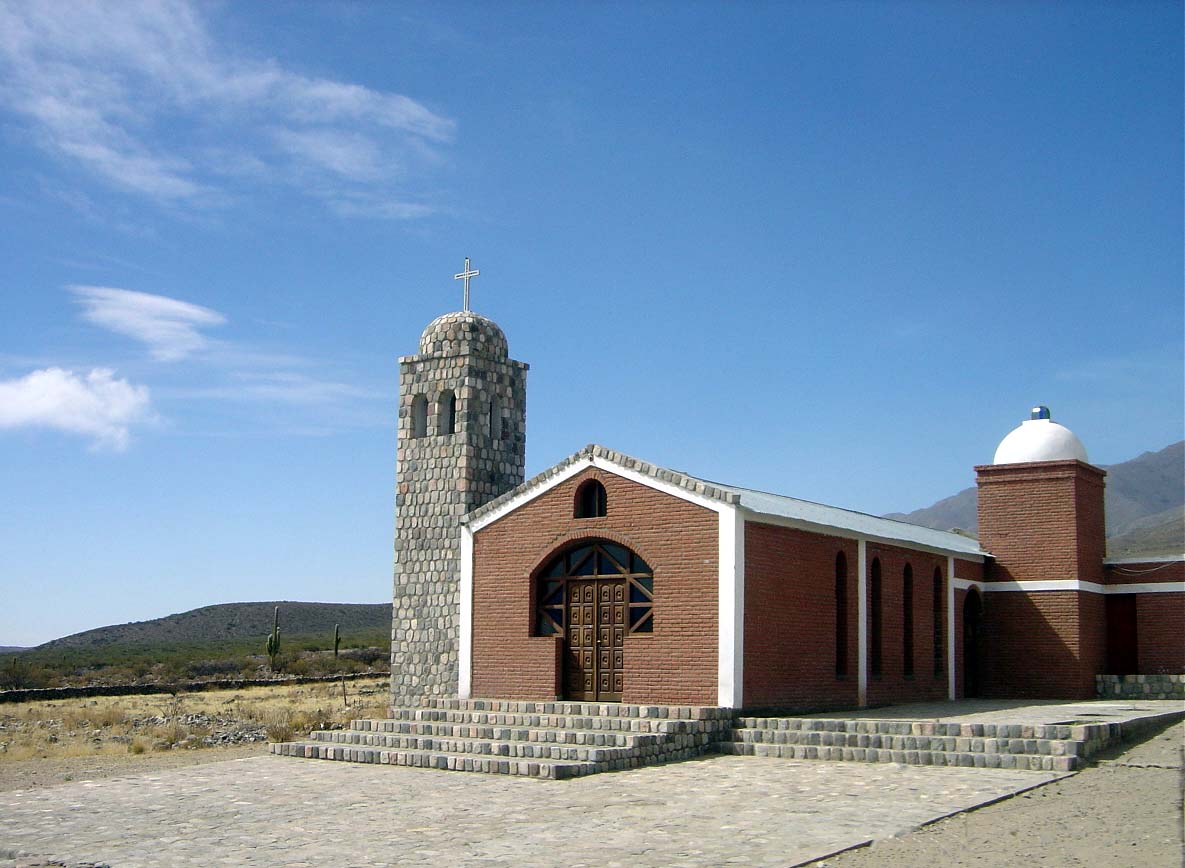
Amaicha del Valle.

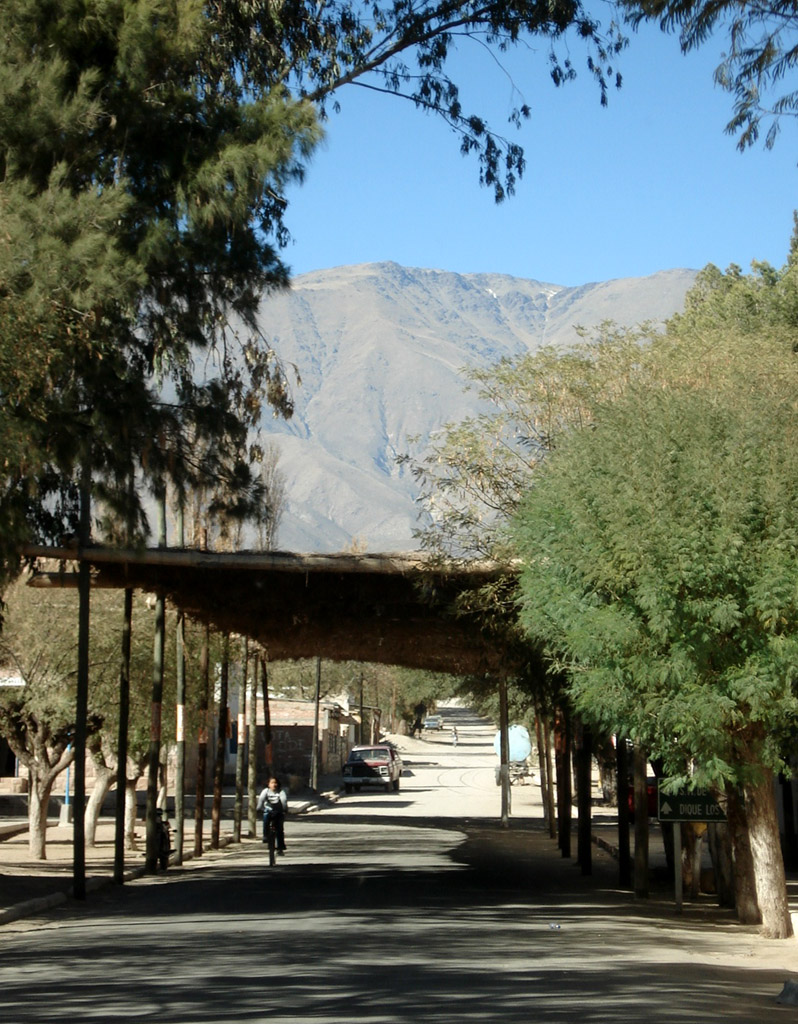
Village street.

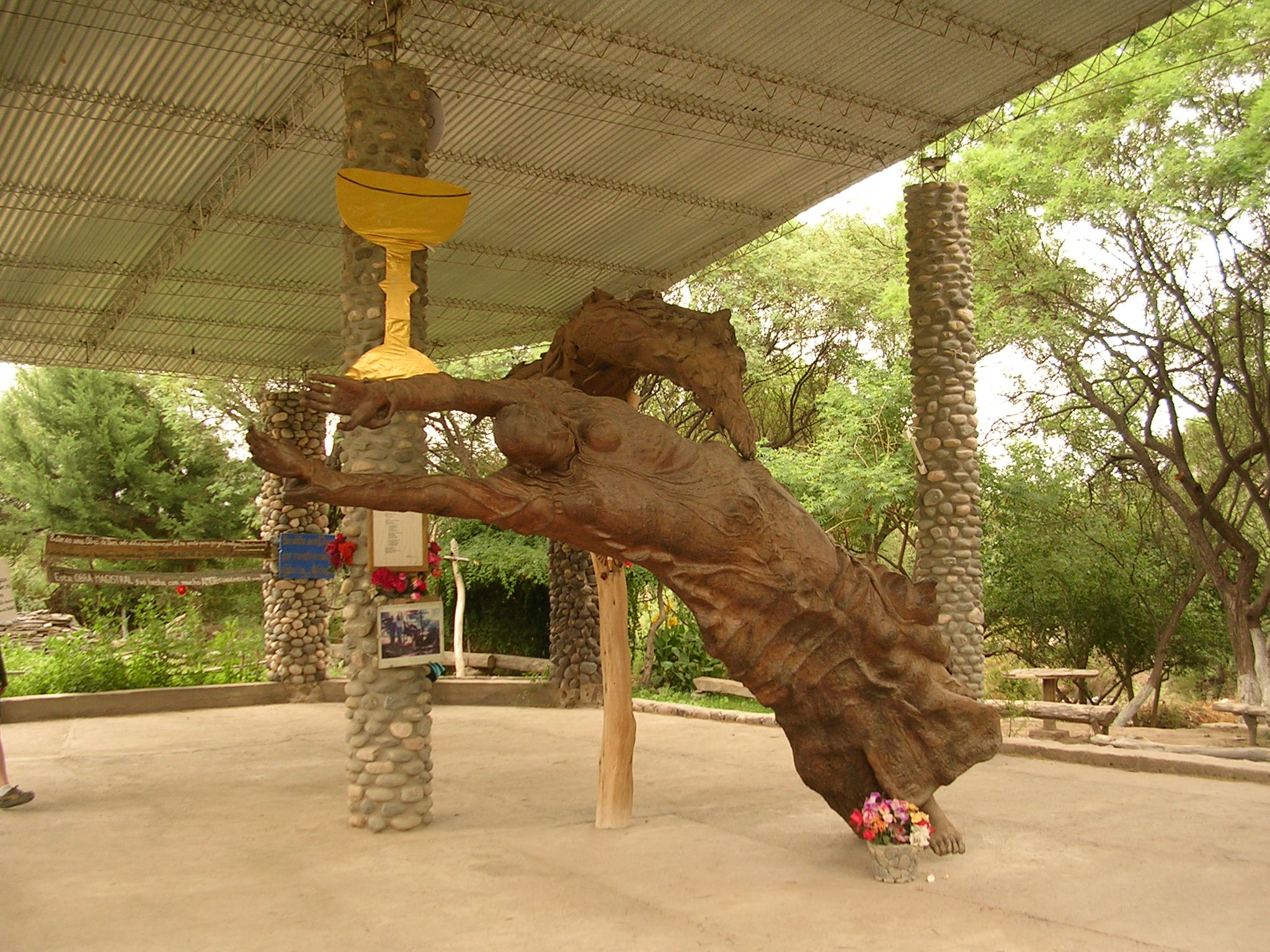
Carved Virgin.

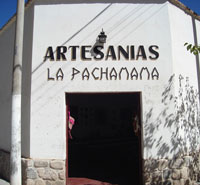
La Pachamama Cooperative.

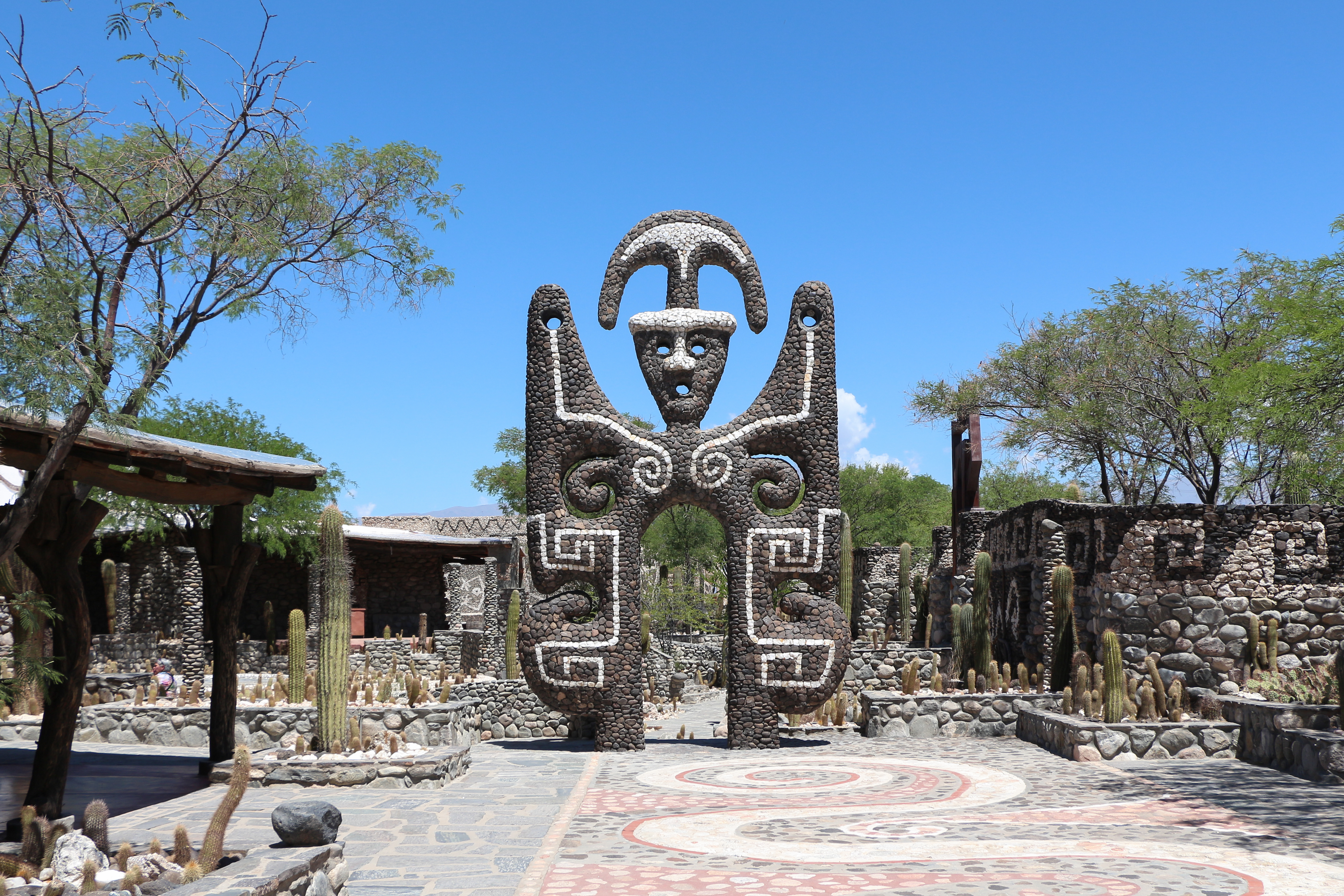
Pachamama Museum.

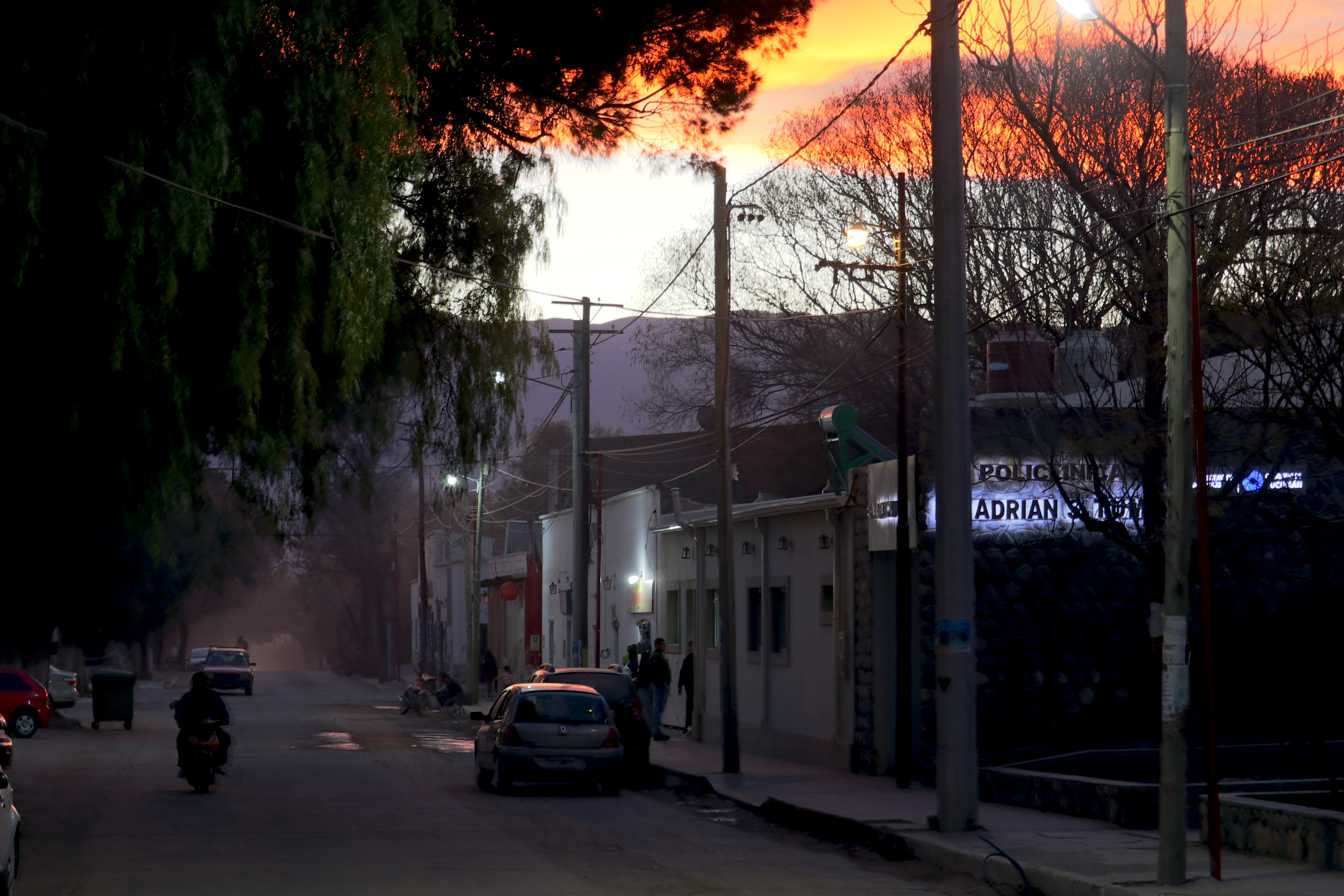
Town center at dusk.
