= Quilmes y Los Sueldos =

Coordinates: 27°05′S 65°15′W

- Interactive map of Quilmes y Los Sueldos
- Country: Argentina
- Province: Tucumán Province
- Time zone: UTC−3 (ART)

Quilmes y Los Sueldos is a settlement in Tucumán Province in northern Argentina.
