= Colalao del Valle =

Coordinates: 26°22′S 65°57′W

- Interactive map of Colalao del Valle
- Country: Argentina
- Province: Tucumán Province

Colalao del Valle is a settlement in Tucumán Province in northern Argentina.
