= Famatina Department =

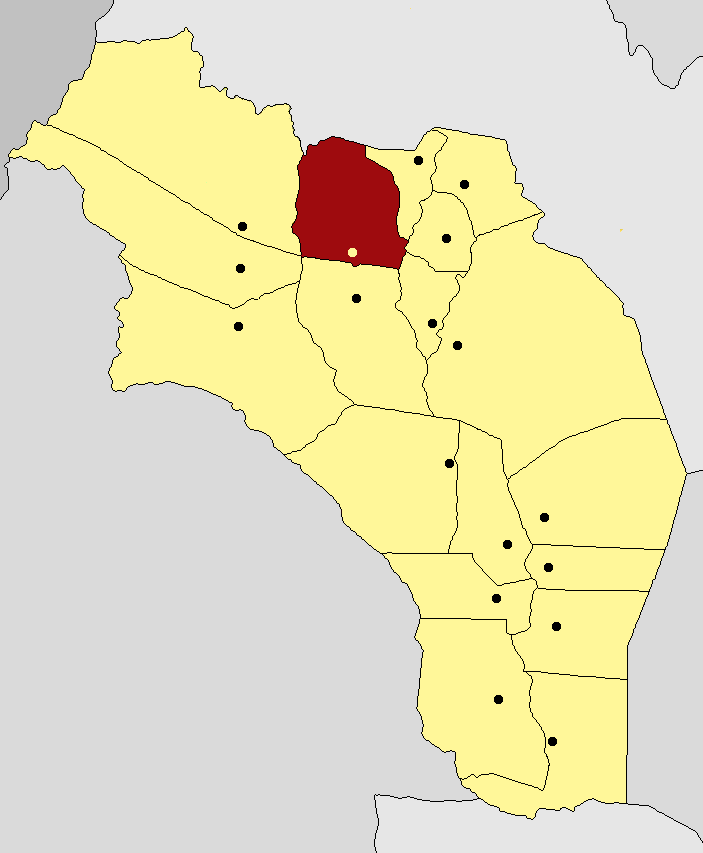
- Famatina within La Rioja Province
- Coordinates: 28°55′29″S 67°31′11″W
- Department: Department
- Province: La Rioja
- Country: Argentina

Area
  - Total: 4,587 km^{2} (1,771 sq mi)

Population (2022)
  - Total: 7,002
  - Density: 1.526/km^{2} (3.954/sq mi)

Famatina is an Argentine Department in La Rioja Province.

== Geography ==
The department borders Catamarca Province to the north, San Blas de los Sauces Department, Castro Barros Department and Sanagasta Department to the east, Chilecito Department to the south, Vinchina Department to the west and General Lamadrid Department to the southwest.

== Population ==
According to estimates for June 2007, the population was 6819 inhabitants.

== Department Localities ==
- Famatina
- Alto Carrizal
- Ángulos
- Antinaco
- Bajo Carrizal
- Campanas
- Chañarmuyo
- La Cuadra
- Pituil
- Plaza Vieja
- Santa Cruz
- Santo Domingo

== Flora & fauna ==
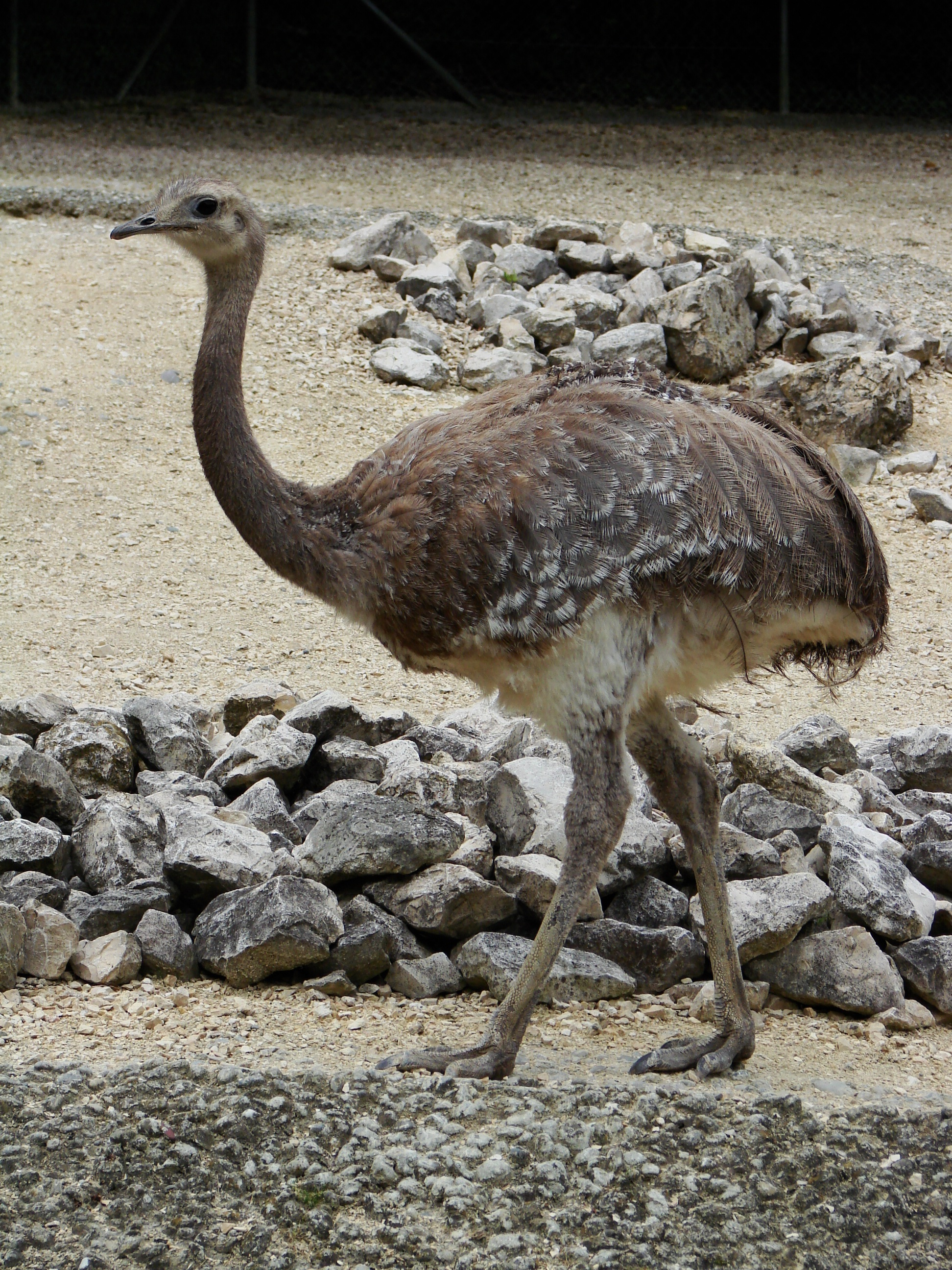
Rhea pennata

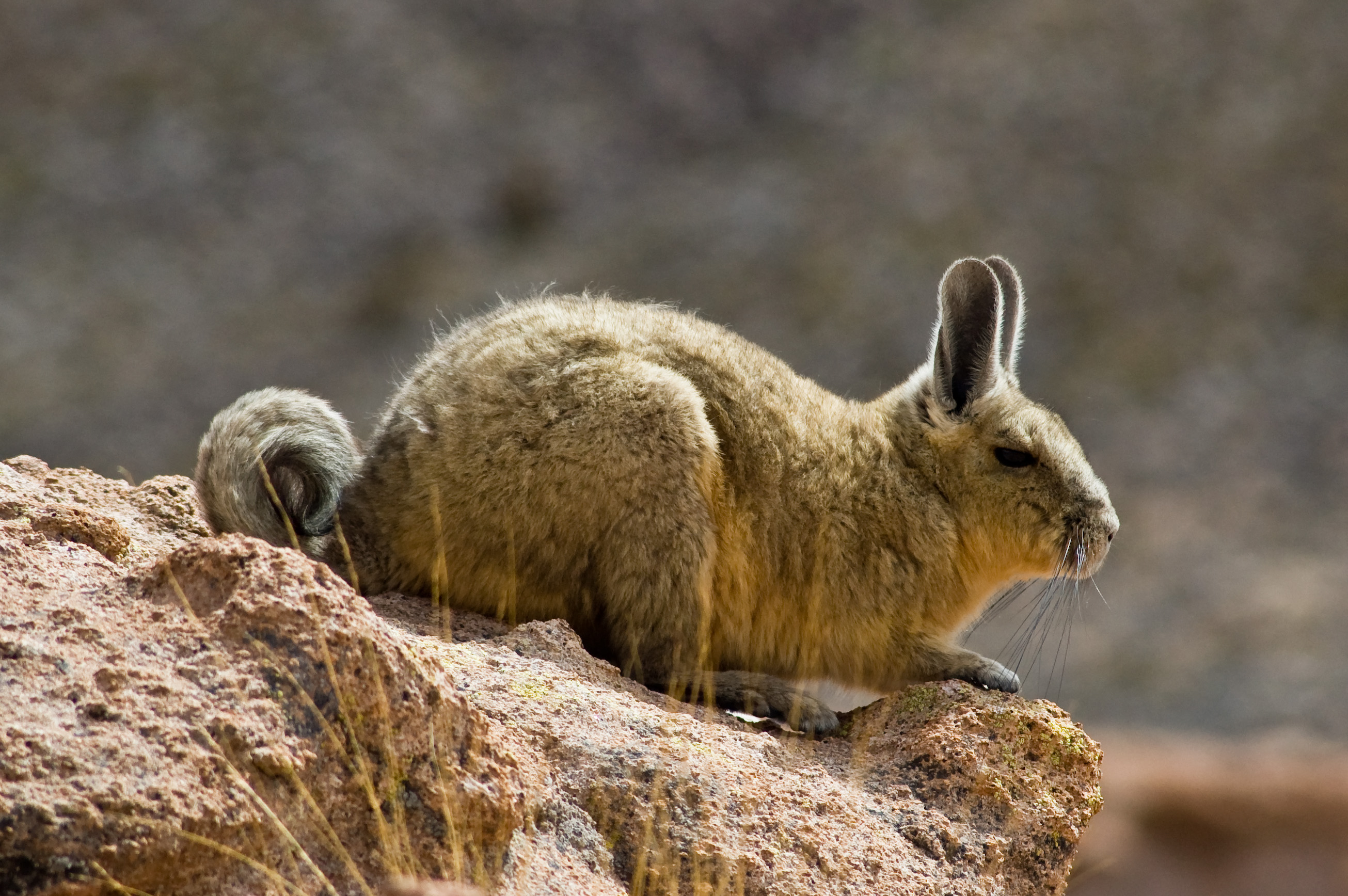
Lagidium viscacia

Endemic Famatina animals are: birds Upucerthia validirostris rufescens, Upucerthia ruficauda famatinae, Cinclodes fuscus riojanus, Asthenes modesta serrana, lizard Liolaemus famatinae (near extinction), Phymaturus mallimacci (near extinction); mammals Abrocoma famatina (near extinction) and Lagidium viscacia famatinae.

There are populations of threatened species of the Andes region (Taruca Hippocamelus antisensis (a large deer species), Vultur gryphus and Rhea pennata.

Endemic plants include Baccharis famatinensis.

=== Serranías del Famatina Provincial Wildlife Reserve ===
The Reserve was decreed in 2002 by provincial law 7292. However, that reserve was never demarcated or implemented.
