= San Blas de los Sauces Department =

San Blas de los Sauces Departamento San Blas de los Sauces
- Department
- Interactive map of San Blas de los Sauces
- Country: Argentina
- Seat: San Blas de los Sauces

Area
  - Total: 1,590 km^{2} (610 sq mi)

Population (2022)
  - Total: 4,314
  - Density: 2.71/km^{2} (7.03/sq mi)

San Blas de los Sauces is a department of the province of La Rioja (Argentina).

== Settlements ==
- Alpasinche
- Andolucas
- Cuipán
- Las Talas
- Salicas
- San Blas, La Rioja
- San Blas de los Sauces
- Shaqui
- Suriyaco
- Tuyubil
