= Coronel Felipe Varela Department =

Coordinates: 29.4700°S 68.3086°W

Coronel Felipe Varela Departamento Coronel Felipe Varela
- Department
- Interactive map of Coronel Felipe Varela
- Country: Argentina
- Seat: Villa Unión

Area
  - Total: 9,184 km^{2} (3,546 sq mi)

Population (2022)
  - Total: 11,372
  - Density: 1.238/km^{2} (3.207/sq mi)

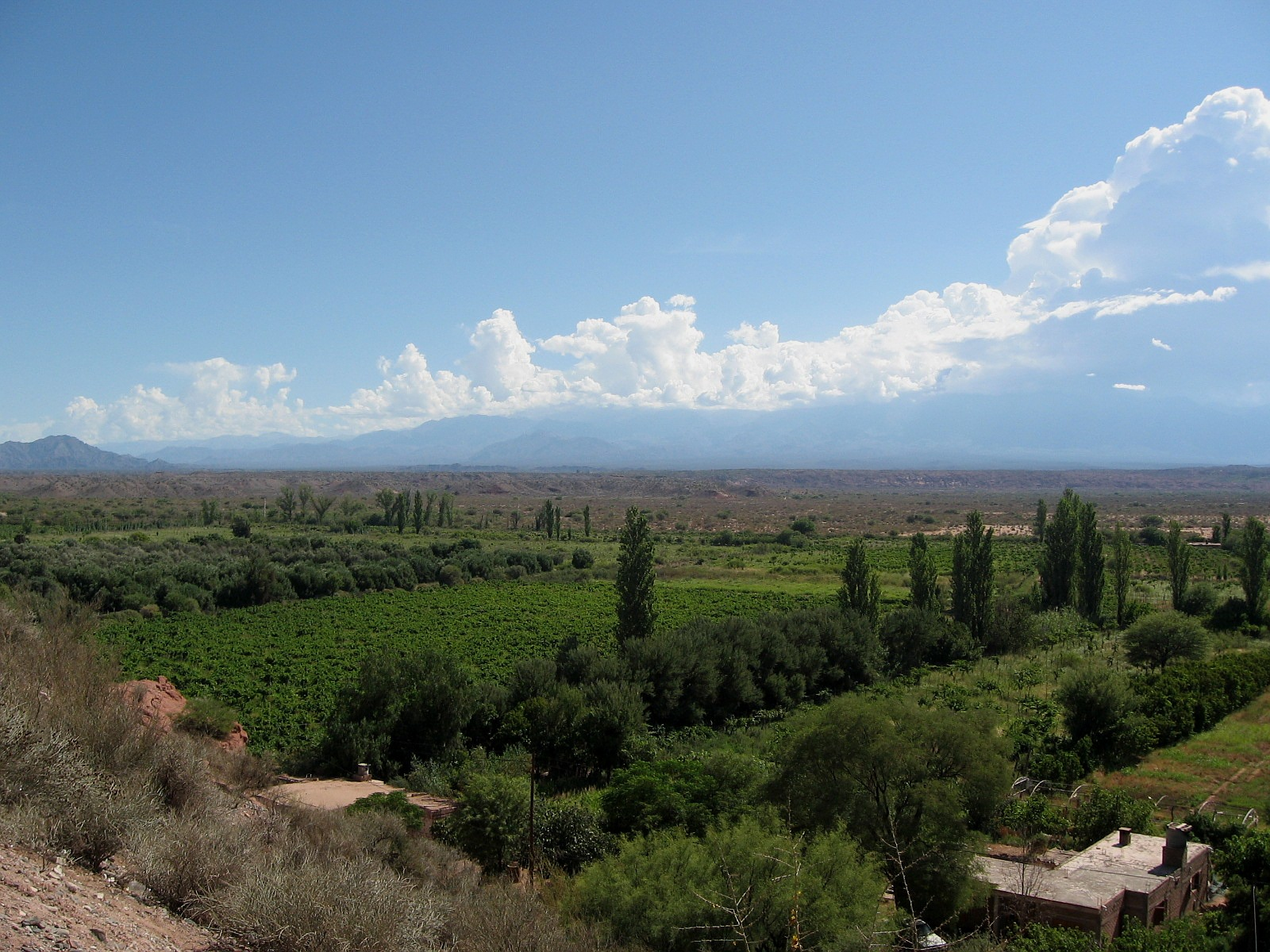
Coronel Felipe Varela Department

Coronel Felipe Varela is a department of the province of La Rioja (Argentina). Its chief town is Villa Unión.

The department is named after Argentine caudillo Felipe Varela.

== Settlements ==
- Aicuña
- Banda Florida
- Guandacol
- Los Palacios
- Los Nacimientos
- Los Tambillos
- Pagancillo
- Santa Clara
- Villa Unión
