= Capayán =

Extinct Argentine Indigenous community

The Capayán were an Indigenous people, now extinct, that lived in Argentine territory.

== Description ==
Their geographical area was parts of the Argentine provinces of La Rioja, Catamarca, San Juan, from the mountainous zone comprising the limit of La Rioja with Catamarca on the Colorado River and the environs of the Jáchal River-Zanjón, in San Juan, including the Andes on the west, up to the Velasco ranges, where they were mixed with the Diaguitas. They occupied the fertile valleys of Famatina, Sanagasta, Yacampis, Guandacol and Jáchal. They had as neighbors in the northern part the Diaguitas and in the southern part the Huarpes.

== Language ==
They shared with the Diaguitas or Paziocas the Kakán language, or a derivation of it. Vestiges of their language are in word endings as bis, 'pebble' or 'small stone', for example: Yacampis, Quilmebis, Guanchina, etc.

== Technology ==
The Capayán had spinning technology, and spun the wool of guanaco and llamas. They also knew copper and gold metallurgy. They built canals and irrigation ditches to water their farmlands. Their cultivars were maize pumpkin, potato and quinoa. They used ceramics widely, principally in the production of funeral urns, decorated geometrically with the colors black, red and white, known as Sanagasta or Angualasto style.

Their houses were of mud and adobe and were sometimes built at the foot of a great tree used as a roof. This technology of construction still lasts in the Riojan zone of Vinchina.

== Decline ==
About 1480, the Inca invaded the region of the Diaguitas and Capayanes, incorporating their territories into the Inca Empire. From 1607, the Spanish conquest resulted in their dispersion and later extinction at the end of the 18th century. The Capayanes took part in an uprising in 1632 together with the Olongastas and other Diaguitas.

Today a department of Catamarca takes their name (the Capayán Department).

== Etymology and ethnic affiliation ==
The etymology of the name started to this people seems to be the Runa simi (Quechua) word Qhapak ñan (Great road), that is to say the so-called "Inca Highway". The explanation for this would be in that the territory that they were living age sedates of a knot of communications very importantly in the south of the Tawantinsuyu. The majority of the authors consider the Capayán as part of the Pazioca ("Diaguitas") due to the cultural common features (for example the use of the language Kakán), the same as the Calchaquíes, Olongastas, Quilmes, though they would have differed because of the genetic and cultural influence of their neighboring Huarpes and after 1480 for the presence of Mitmakuna persons deported to this region by the Incas. Many of such Mitimaes would have traded and manufactured "chicha", an alcoholic maize drink, and churumata.
