= Villa Unión =

- City
- Location of Villa Unión in Argentina
- Coordinates: 29°18′S 68°12′W
- Country: Argentina
- Province: La Rioja
- Department: Coronel Felipe Varela
- Elevation: 1,153 m (3,783 ft)

Population
  - Total: 12,263
- Time zone: UTC-3 (ART)
- CPA base: A5250
- Dialing code: +54 3825
- Climate: BWk

Villa Unión is a city in northwestern Argentina and the main settlement of Coronel Felipe Varela Department with a population of 12,263.

== Overview ==
The city is located in the heart of the Bermejo Valley, 1,153 meters above sea level, at the foothills of the Andes mountains. Set midst the Sierra de Famatina and Sierra del Maíz Gordo mountain ranges, Villa Unión is surrounded by local, traditional wineries and an offshoot of the Desaguadero River flows near the city.

The weather is hot and rainy during the summer, January and February being the wettest months, while it is dry and cold during winter. As the soil can't easily get rid of the heavy rainfall, the area commonly floods during the rainy season. The area represents a typical climate of the mountain desert, with a soaring difference in temperatures between day and night. Villa Unión is affected by a climate phenomenon called the "Zonda wind" - a dry wind often carrying dust, which comes from the polar maritime air, warmed by descent from the crest, which is some 6,000 m (18,999 ft) above sea level. It may exceed a velocity of 40 km/h (25 mph) and may lead to changes in air pressure, commonly causing people headache.

The nearest airport is the Capitán Vicente Almandos Amonacide Airport in La Rioja, 3 kilometers from the city center of the city of La Rioja. Three weekly flights are offered between Buenos Aires and La Rioja by Aerolíneas Argentinas.

Nearby towns from Villa Unión are Los Palacios, Banda Florida, Villa Casteli, Vinchina, Guandacol, Aicuña, and Patquía. Nearest major cities from Villa Unión are San Juan, La Rioja, Chilecito, Catamarca, and Córdoba.

== History ==
The area which is now Department of Coronel Felipe Varela, was inhabited by the Diaguita - Chapayane Indians who lived in the village of Guandacol. The Spaniards came to the Bermejo Valley around 1634, but their occupation was resisted by the Indians of Guandacol until 1636, when the Indians were punished for their resistance by Don Geronimo Luis de Cabrera, who banished them from their lands and send them to the hills of the Famatina mountain range. Many died in their journey to the new land, and the few who survived settled in a new location. The old land of the Guandacol Indians was reclaimed in 1649 by General Pedro Nicolás Brizuela, and the land was officially given back to them on 25 January 1650.

At the beginning of the seventeenth century, there was a settlement of white people that can be considered as the first inhabitants of Hornillos, present day Villa Unión. They lived in peace with the local indigenous population, which were living in the region after being exiled from their lands.

In about 1750, three families from Western Chile came to the region and settled in Guandacol, but for unknown reasons left and settled down in Los Hornillos, which today is Villa Unión. Los Hornillos takes its name from the kilns that the locals used on the banks of the Bermejo River to bake homemade bread.

Los Hornillos becomes Villa Unión On 1 December 1869, the province was divided into twelve departments, which specified the limits of Departamento Guandacol, making Villa Guandacol the main town of the department and Los Hornillos was a district within the new department. On 9 September 1881, the name of Departamento Guandacol was changed into Departamento General Lavalle and the main settlement was now Los Hornillos, whose name was changed into Villa Unión.

The name Villa Unión takes its significance from the three Chilean families who were expelled from Guandacol and moved to Los Hornillos in 1880, where the local residents did not only give them protection, but also gave them ownership of land so that they could settle down. Therefore, Villa Unión represents the cohesion and commitment among the families of these two peoples - "The Village of Union".

The city used to be centralized around the area where now is Hospital Zonal Dr. Eduardo Salomón Neira, due to the 1854 earthquake which left the city in ruins and the locals were forced to move their settlement a little north. The village of Villa Unión consisted of three major streets, arranged in a North - South manner. The main street today is Avenida Nicolás Davila.

== Economy ==
Villa Unión is an agricultural city, with around 50% of its industry devoted to the growing of grape fruit, and the rest growing various fruits, cereals and fodder. The grape is of high alcohol content, favored by the excellent climate of Villa Unión, with the average annual temperature of 17 °C, a maximum of 42 °C and absolute minimum of -7 °C.

Livestock farming is not significant in the region, only enough to cover the local consumption.

In the surrounding area of Villa Unión there are several mines, extracting clay, barytes, cobalt, galena, iron, pyrophyllite, lead, coal, talc and two marble quarries.

In the recent years, Villa Unión has been growing as a base for Ecotourism, offering a variety of tours, circuits and destinations, the most notable one being the impressive Talampaya canyons.

The international route from Villa Unión to Copiapó in Chile is under construction and will soon be opened, with a paved road and a tunnel, allowing crossing of the Andes the whole year round on good roads, which is believed to improve life in the city of Villa Unión in the coming years, for its new strategic position for international trade.

== Attractions ==
- Talampaya National Park
- Ischigualasto National Park
- Banda Florida
- Laguna Brava
- Vinchina
- Corona del Inca
- Anchumbil
- Miguel Angel Gaitán "The Miraculous Angel"
- Aicuña
- Cuesta de Miranda
- Guandacol

== Culture and arts ==
Villa Unión produces some delicacies like Vino Patero (Foot-stepping wine) and dried fruits. Every year, during Carnaval times, there is Festival del Peon Viñador - celebrating the wine harvest and traditional ways of producing wine - stepping on them.
