= Antinaco =

Antinaco may refer to:

- Antinaco, Catamarca, Argentina
- Antinaco, La Rioja, Argentina
