= General Juan Facundo Quiroga Department =

General Juan Facundo Quiroga Departamento General Juan Facundo Quiroga
- Department
- Interactive map of General Juan Facundo Quiroga
- Country: Argentina
- Seat: Malanzán

Area
  - Total: 2,585 km^{2} (998 sq mi)

Population (2022)
  - Total: 4,017
  - Density: 1.554/km^{2} (4.025/sq mi)

General Juan Facundo Quiroga is a department of La Rioja Province in Argentina.

== Settlements ==
- Atiles
- Illisca
- La Aguadita
- Malanzán
- Nácate
- Portezuelo
- San Antonio
- San Ramón
- San Roque
