= Asthenes modesta serrana =

Scientific classification
- Domain: Eukaryota
- Kingdom: Animalia
- Phylum: Chordata
- Class: Aves
- Order: Passeriformes
- Family: Furnariidae
- Genus: Asthenes
- Species: A. modesta
- Subspecies: A. m. serrana

Trinomial name
- Asthenes modesta serrana Nores, 1986

Subspecies of bird

Asthenes modesta serrana is a small South American bird, a subspecies of the cordilleran canastero. It is found in the Sierra de Famatina, in La Rioja Province of northern Argentina, at an altitude of about 3200 m.
