= Nácate =

Coordinates: 30°51′S 66°27′W

Nacate
- Municipality and village
- Interactive map of Nacate
- Country: Argentina
- Province: La Rioja Province
- Department: General Juan Facundo Quiroga Department

Government
  - Intendente: Rolando Busto (PJ)

Population
  - Total: 450
- Time zone: UTC−3 (ART)

Nácate is a small village in General Juan Facundo Quiroga Department Department in La Rioja Province in northwestern Argentina.

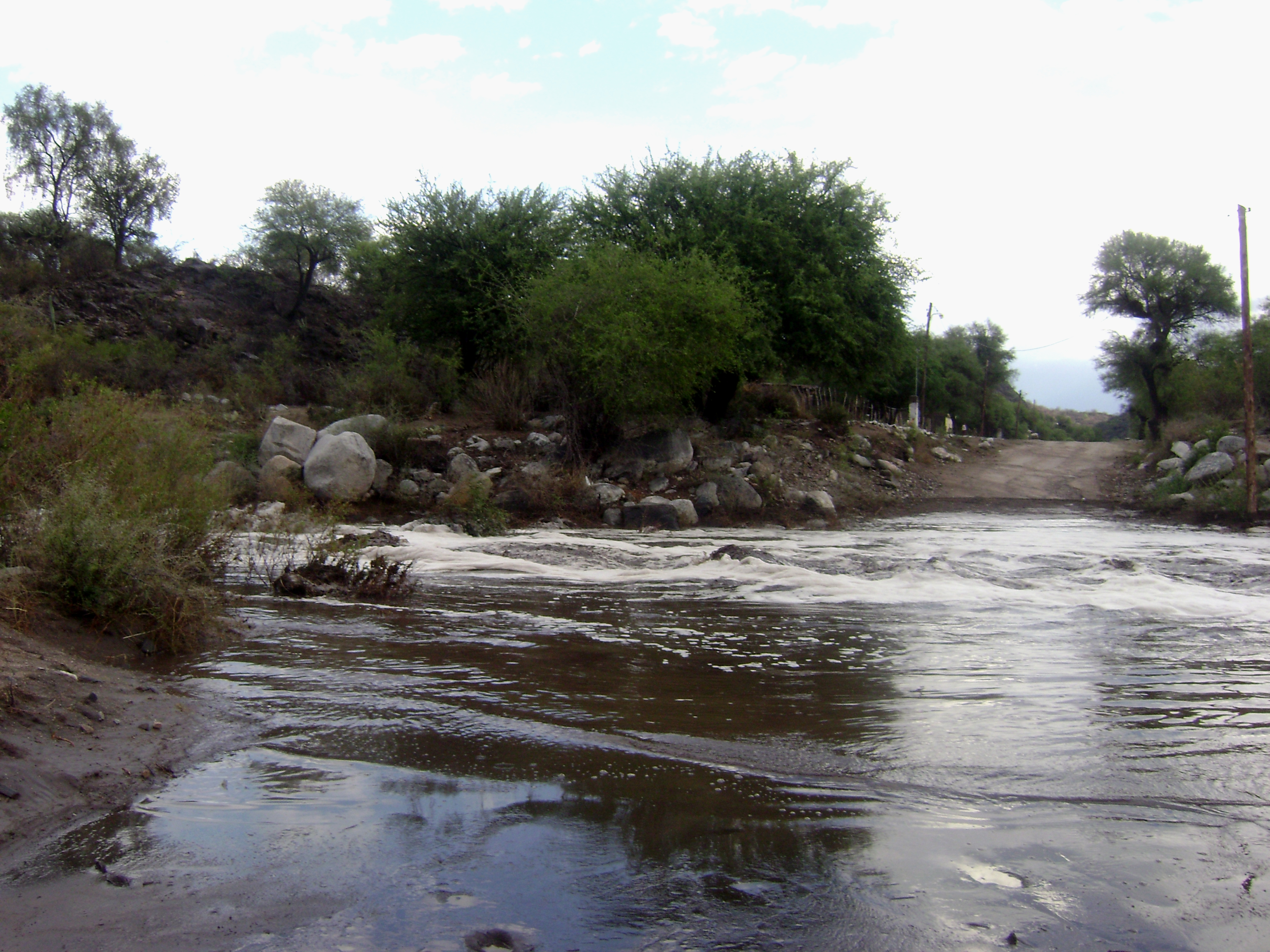
Nacate river
