= Portezuelo =

Portezuelo may refer to:

- Portezuelo, Chile, a municipality in the province of Itata, Ñuble region.
- Portezuelo, Cáceres, a municipality in the province of Cáceres, Extremadura, Spain.
- Portezuelo, La Rioja, a municipality in the province of La Rioja, Argentina.
