= Pituil =

- Town
- Location within Argentina Location within South America
- Coordinates: 28°34′34″S 67°26′57″W
- Country: Argentina
- Province: La Rioja Province
- Department: Famatina
- Elevation: 4,327 ft (1,319 m)

Population (2010)
  - Total: 849
- Time zone: UTC−3 (ART)
- Postal code: F5361
- Area code: 03825

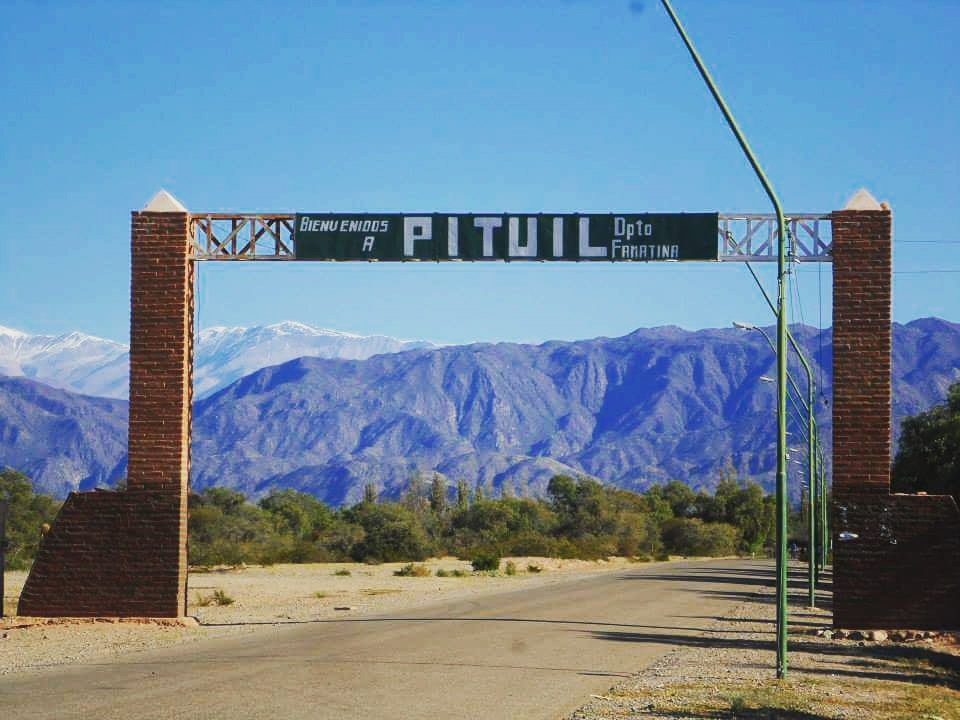
Entrance to Pituil

Pituil is a town in the Famatina Department of La Rioja Province in northwestern Argentina.

The urban area extends in the vicinity of the provincial route No. 39 and one of the accesses to the town is located at km 3,947 of National Route 40.

== Population ==
It is one of the most populated towns in the Famatina department. It had 849 inhabitants in 2010, which represents a decrease of 16% compared to 1,008 inhabitants from the previous census of 2001.
