= General Ocampo Department =

General Ocampo Departamento General Ocampo
- Department
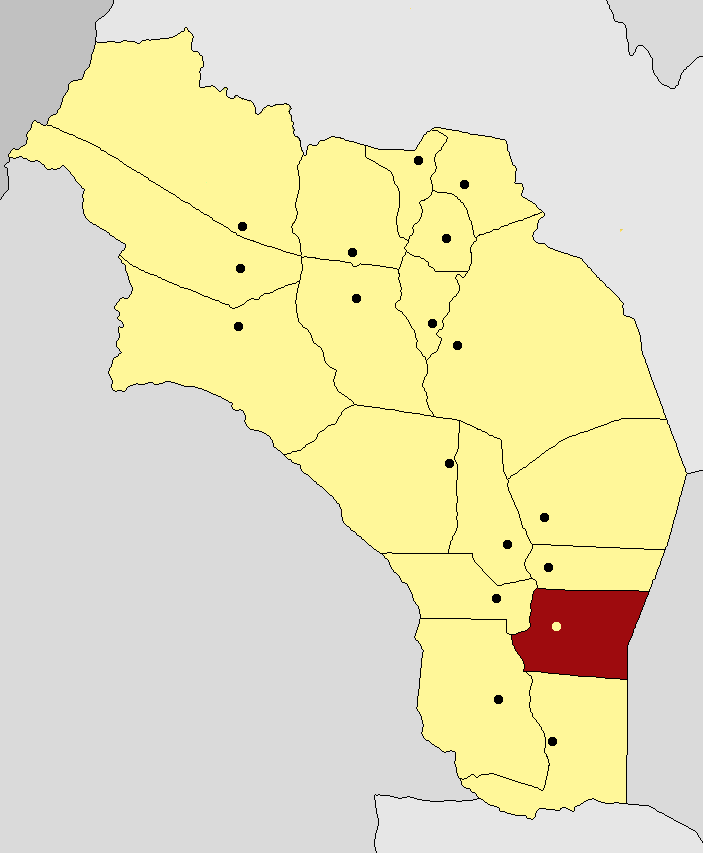
- Interactive map of General Ocampo
- Country: Argentina
- Seat: Milagro

Area
  - Total: 2,135 km^{2} (824 sq mi)

Population (2022)
  - Total: 7,349
  - Density: 3.442/km^{2} (8.915/sq mi)

General Ocampo is a department of La Rioja Province (Argentina).

== Settlements ==
- Ambil
- Dique de Anzulon
- El Milagro
- Olpas
- Villa Santa Rita de Catuna
