= General Ángel Vicente Peñaloza Department =

Coordinates: 30.3142°S 66.6550°W

General Ángel Vicente Peñaloza Departamento General Ángel Vicente Peñaloza
- Department
- Interactive map of General Ángel Vicente Peñaloza
- Country: Argentina
- Seat: Tama

Area
  - Total: 3,106 km^{2} (1,199 sq mi)

Population (2022)
  - Total: 3,185
  - Density: 1.025/km^{2} (2.656/sq mi)

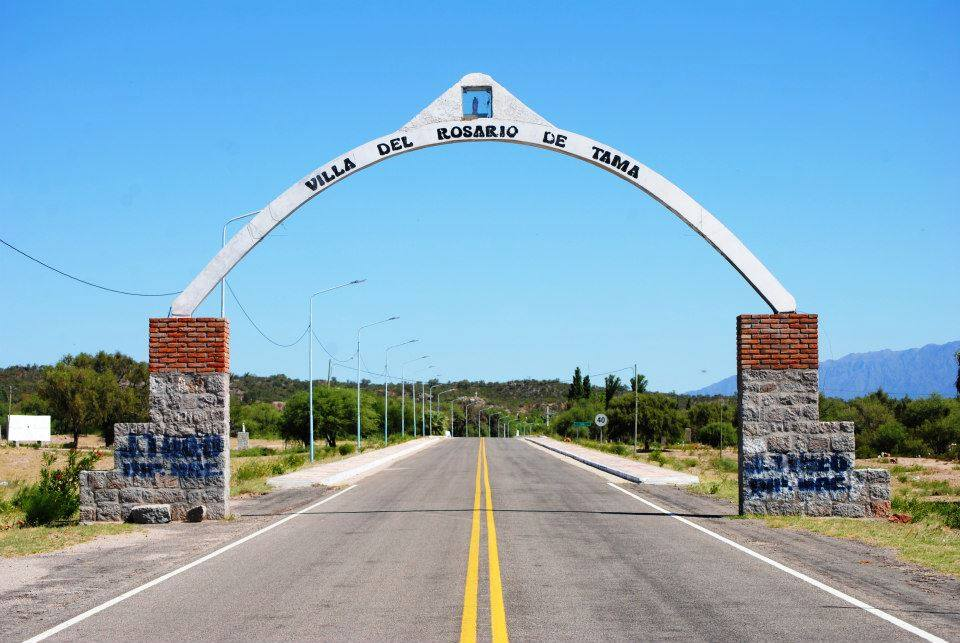
General Ángel V. Peñaloza

General Ángel Vicente Peñaloza is a department of the province of La Rioja (Argentina).

== Settlements ==
- Alcázar
- Carrizal
- Chila
- Punta de los Llanos
- Tama
- Tuizon
