= Villa Santa Rita de Catuna =

Coordinates: 30°57′S 66°13′W

- Municipality and village
- Interactive map of Villa Santa Rita de Catuna
- Country: Argentina
- Province: La Rioja Province
- Department: General Ortiz de Ocampo
- Elevation: 1,540 ft (470 m)

Population (2010)
  - Total: 1,695
- Time zone: UTC−3 (ART)

Villa Santa Rita de Catuna is a municipality and village within the General Ocampo Department of La Rioja Province in northwestern Argentina.
