= Nevado de Famatina =

Mountain in Argentina

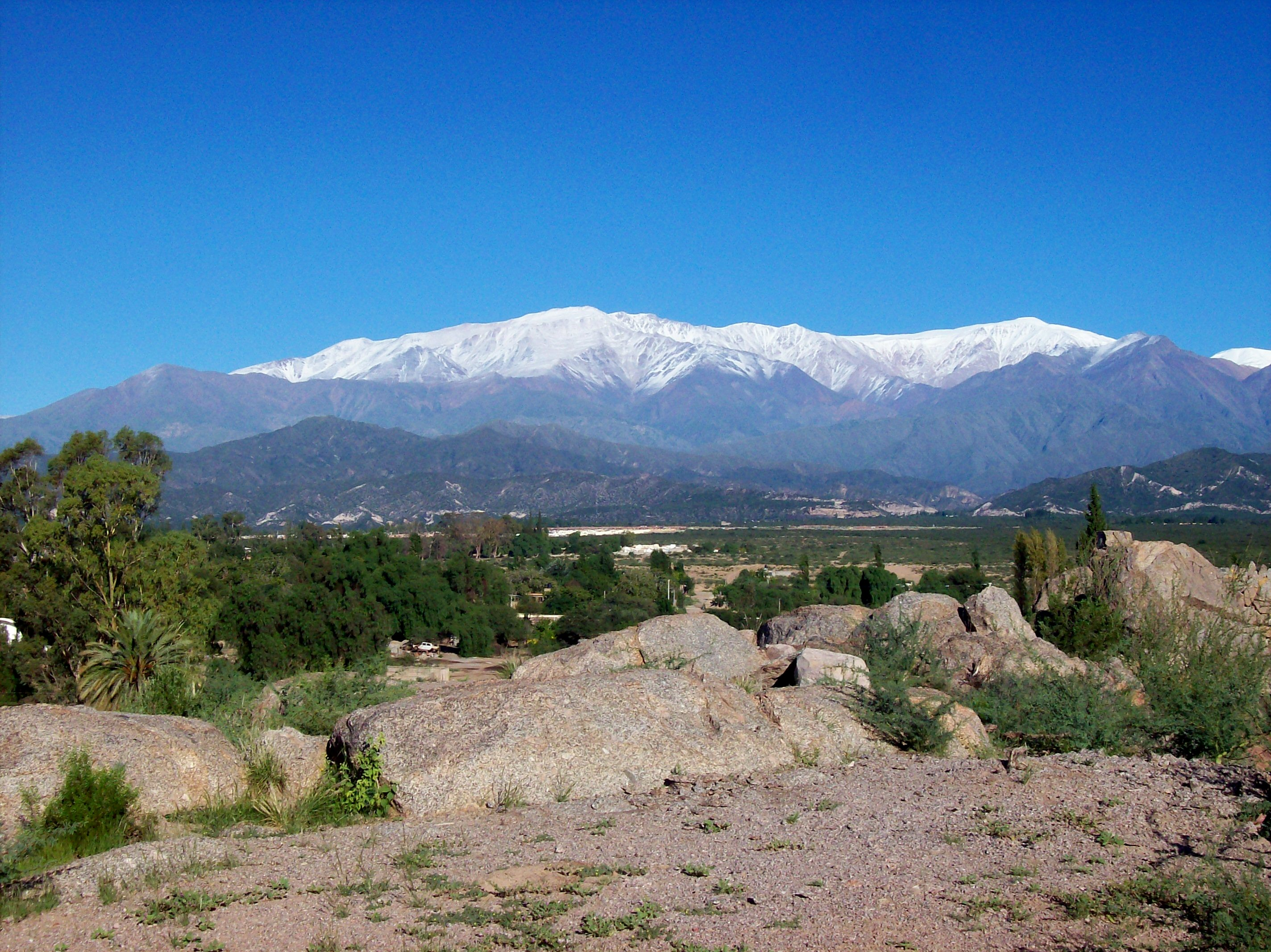
- View of Nevado de Famatina from Chilecito

Highest point
- Elevation: 6,115 m (20,062 ft)
- Prominence: 2,783 m (9,131 ft)
- Parent peak: Ojos del Salado
- Coordinates: 29°0′52.56″S 067°49′35.04″W

Geography
- Location within Argentina
- Parent range: Sierra de Famatina, Andes

Climbing
- First ascent: 05/20/1895 - Rudolf Hauthal (Germany)

Nevado de Famatina (also called Cerro General Belgrano) is a peak in Argentina with an elevation of 6,115 metres (20,062 ft) metres. It is the highest point of Sierra de Famatina. It is located within the territory of the Argentinean province of La Rioja. Its slopes are within the administrative boundaries of the Argentinean cities: Famatina and Chilecito.

== First ascent ==
The first recorded ascent of Famatina was by Rudolf Hauthal (Germany) on 20 May 1895.

== Elevation ==
Other data from available digital elevation models: SRTM yields 6094 metres, ALOS 6066 metres and TanDEM-X 6124 metres. The height of the nearest key col is 3332 meters, leading to a topographic prominence of 2783 meters. Its topographic dominance is 45.51%, parent peak is Ojos del Salado and the Topographic isolation is 223.1 kilometers.
