= Cacán =

Language of northern Argentina and Chile

- Diaguita–Calchaquí
- Kakán
- Native to: Northern Argentina and Chile
- Ethnicity: Diaguita, Calchaquí
- Language family: unclassified

Language codes
- ISO 639-3: None (mis)
- Glottolog: calc1235

Cacán (also Cacan, Kakán, Kakana, Calchaquí, Chaka, Diaguita, and Kaka) is an unclassified language spoken by the Indigenous Diaguita and Calchaquí peoples in northern Argentina and Chile. It has claimed to be of various linguistic affiliations.

== Name ==
The name Diaguita is from Cacán tiac-y-ta 'village inhabitant'. The language was originally called Caca according to the Jesuit Alonso de Bárcena, but was modified to its current form.

== History ==
In the 16th century, the Cacán-speaking Diaguita people, who were "subdivided into numerous subtribes", such as the Calchaquí, Capayán, Hualfín, Pazioca, Pular and Quilme, lived in a vast territory encompassing modern-day Catamarca, La Rioja, and parts of Salta and San Juan provinces, and shared Tucumán and Santiago del Estero provinces with the Tonocoté. They notably resided in the Calchaquí Valley, crossing areas of Catamarca, Tucumán, and Salta. Around this time, the name Diaguita referred only to the Indigenous peoples of Catamarca and La Rioja, excluding those in the Calchaquí Valley. Following their defeat in the Calchaquí Wars, the Diaguitas were deported to other areas, entirely depopulating the Calchaquí Valley. Among the deported were the Quilmes, who were moved to what is now Quilmes, located in the Greater Buenos Aires area.

=== Documentation ===
The language was documented in a grammar by Barcena, but the manuscript is lost.

== Classification ==
Genetic affiliation of the language remains unclear, and it has not been conclusively linked to any existing language family, though past proposals have included a link with Kunza and the essentially unknown Humahuaca.

== Dialects ==
According to Willem Adelaar (2004), some varieties, such as Capayana, required interpreters for the Spaniards to comprehend, indicating its status as a distinct language.

=== Mason (1950) ===
Mason (1950) lists the Diaguita subgroups of Abaucan, Amaycha, Anchapa, Andalgalá, Anguinahao, Calchaquí, Casminchango, Coipe, Colalao, Famatina, Hualfina, Paquilin, Quilme, Tafí, Tocpo, Tucumán, Upingascha, and Yocabil. Acalian, Catamarca, and Tamano are possibly also Diaguita subgroups.

== Vocabulary ==
Cacán vocabulary possibly exists today in toponyms and local surnames, but the etymologies are often dubious. The Jesuit missionary Father Pedro Lozano recorded a few words of the language, listed in Nardi (1977) and Piispanen (2021).

A phrase in Cacán and five other Indigenous languages of southern South America was recorded by Alonzo de Barcena in a 1594 letter, being Tius costa huma 'God regards you'.

Cacán words
Gloss	Piispanen (2021)
town, region; river; valley	vile
town	ahao (Note: May be exclusive to northern Cacán)
cactus thorn	ali
town	gasta (Note: May be exclusive to southern Cacán)
fertility deity	cacanchik
lord and king	titakin
Inca	inca
courageous	kalcha
much	qui
altar; place of sacrifice	zupka
shaman; medic	machi
head	enxam
water	ma
water	ango ~ anco
channel, stream	mampa
fire	tutu
sun	fil
tree	ki
type of acacia	bisco
type of lignum vitae	guacala (Note: May be from Spanish guacal 'wooden crate, calabash tree (Crescentia cujete), vessel of about equal height and width for storing or washing things in' ultimately from Classical Nahuatl huacalli.)
type of edible fruit legume	chica
possible name of hallucinogenic fruit	sibil (Note: Toponym)
likely type of fruit-bearing plant	tasi
type of poisonous bush	nio
type of cactus	quimil
type of owl	colcol (Note: Borrowed into Argentinian Spanish colcol 'great horned owl (Bubo virginianus)', which is likely the original meaning in Cacán.)
type of bird of prey	choya
trush [sic]	viñi
type of small bird	isma ~ ishma (Note: Borrowed into Argentinian Spanish isma 'chiguanco thrush (Turdus chiguanco)', which is likely the original meaning in Cacán.)
sea bird	waco
chicken	walpa (Note: Quechua loanword)
type of beetle	champi
type of guanaco	talca
tortuga	walu
cat	mishi (Note: Loanword)
likely type of raven or vulture	paja
arrow	talcol
maize	hua

=== Viegas Barros (2023) ===
The following list of words is taken from Viegas Barros (2023), who collected them from a rememberer of the language in 2021.

Gloss	Cacán
20	[ˈtika]
dry	[ˈsaχːi]
hard to take out	[ʧaˈsampi]
maize	[ˈsaχːaɾa]
