= Tuyubil =

Coordinates: 28°34′S 67°13′W

- Municipality and village
- Interactive map of Tuyubil
- Country: Argentina
- Province: La Rioja Province
- Department: San Blas
- Elevation: 3,898 ft (1,188 m)

Population (2010)
  - Total: 3,918
- Time zone: UTC−3 (ART)

Tuyubil is a municipality and village in La Rioja Province in northwestern Argentina.
