= Ambil =

Ambil may refer to:

- Ambil, La Rioja, a village in Argentina
- Ambil, Looc, an island barangay in the Philippines
