= San Antonio, General Juan Facundo Quiroga =

Coordinates: 31°05′S 66°44′W

San Antonio (General Juan Facundo Quiroga)
- Municipality and village
- Interactive map of San Antonio (General Juan Facundo Quiroga)
- Country: Argentina
- Province: La Rioja Province
- Elevation: 2,805 ft (855 m)

Population (2010)
  - Total: 149
- Time zone: UTC−3 (ART)
- Climate: BSh

San Antonio (General Juan Facundo Quiroga) is a municipality and village within the General Juan Facundo Quiroga Department of La Rioja Province in northwestern Argentina.
