= Olpas =

Coordinates: 30°48′S 66°15′W

- Municipality and village
- Interactive map of Olpas
- Country: Argentina
- Province: La Rioja Province
- Department: General Ocampo Department
- Time zone: UTC−3 (ART)
- Climate: BSh

Olpas is a municipality and village in La Rioja Province in northwestern Argentina.
