= Yacampis =

Languages
- Cacán

Religion
- Animism

Related ethnic groups
- Diaguita

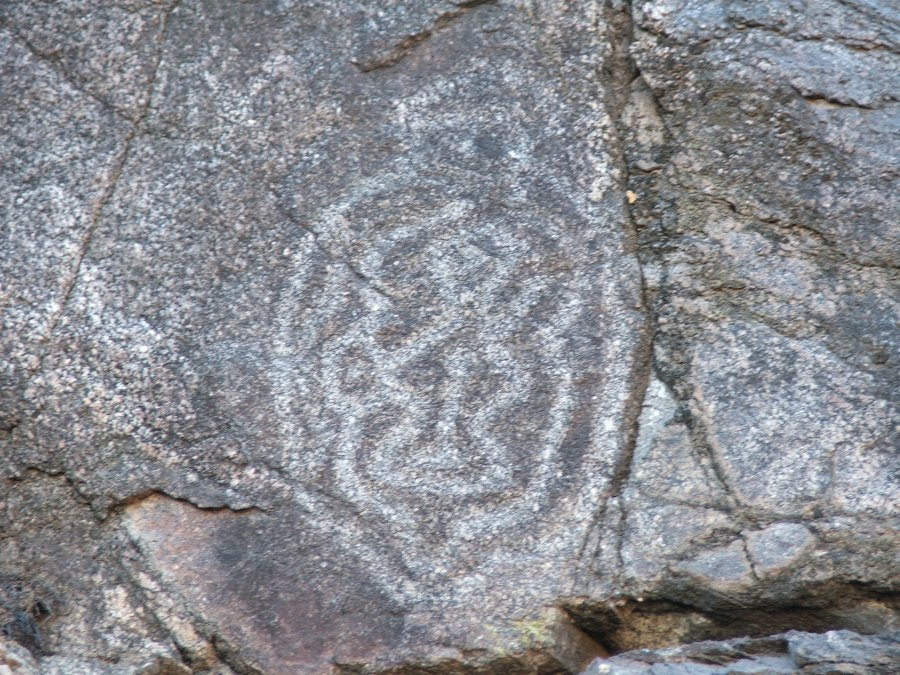
Petroglyph from Las Tumanas River, Valle Fértil, San Juan Province

Yacampis was the name that colonial records from the mid-16th century give to Cacán-speaking indigenous groups that inhabited the Valle Fértil region and the Río Bermejo valley in north-west from Argentina. These peoples were recognized with the ethnonym yacampis, being used by the colonial administration to refer to an indigenous group differentiated as a southern part of the large Diaguita or Pazioca nation that inhabited the province of La Rioja and the northeast of San Juan, until its abandonment. as categories of ethnic recognition in the eighteenth and nineteenth centuries. However, it is not known if this name was the one by which they recognized each other as a group, or if they had a name that identified them. This ethnic name would originate from a family clan that colonial officials registered to identify various groups, related or not, that they found inhabiting the region.

== Etymology ==
As a colonial exonym, the yacampis name could not be related to the one that these peoples identified themselves with. Recent studies even point to linking the origin of this name to that of the dominant family or leader in the area at the time of the arrival of the Spanish. In 1588, the name of a leader named Capaya-Yacambis from the Angacao region (currently Jáchal) appears on a warrant issued to Captain Juan Baldovinos de Leyde. Together with other ethnonyms imposed by the colonizers -for example, the exonym capayán to refer to the capayanes as a differentiated ethnic group-, they could originally come from eponyms of the native peoples, names with which important events and characters associated with defense were known. of the territory, -for example, in the Calchaquí valley, the Calchaquí peoples are known by reference to the cacique Juan Calchaquí, or the Tucumán, known as the land of Tuc'ma-, but that did not entail ethnic, cultural, religious differences, linguistic or of some kind with their neighbors. The name would allude to the social structure of those native peoples who organized themselves politically through marriage unions between important lineages to establish territorial alliances, but which the colonial manipulation of the administration of entrusted Indians extended them as categories of ethnic identification.

== Ethnology of Yacampis ==
This people is classified as the southernmost part of the Pazioca ethnic group that inhabited northwestern Argentina. At present, the ethnological, ethnohistorical and archaeological studies dedicated to this group agree that the Yacampis lived between the years 1000 AD and 1562 AD. C. in the valleys and mountain ravines of the Sierra de Valle Fértil, where there was an interregional corridor between Tucumán and the foothills of San Juan, connecting with the western side of the Andes (the country of the Chilis), and in which it developed a multi-ethnic coexistence between diverse partialities, mainly structured through lineage relationships and not within ethnic groups. The socio-economic links evidenced by the trafficking of objects between one side of the Andes and the other makes us think the opposite of constituting an "ethnic border" as the classical theory on the Cuyo settlement maintains. Prior to the Hispanic arrival, the circulation on the east-west axis between the Chaco region and the other side of the mountain range would allow us to think of a permeable road, not being able to prove differences between nations when neither anthropology, history nor linguistics has not been able to prove that from the names that reach us to the present they show linguistic relationships between disappeared languages such as Kakán and Huarpe, and with languages with speakers such as Quechua and Mapudungun.

Given the ethnic diversity present in the first contact with the Spanish conquerors, the Yacampis have been related to other Kakana-speaking peoples located in the area at that time, such as the Olongasta (located around the salt flats of the plains of southeastern Rioja) or as the descendants of the encounter between paziocas and huarpes. However, in a region dominated by interethnic links between diverse factions, it is very likely that they were linked and differentiated within a broad social network across different territories. Although it is still under discussion, according to the early chronicles of Father Luis de Valdivia at the beginning of the 17th century, the Hulungastas would have been one of the families or houses of the southernmost Yacampis group. Usually the names of the Diaguita families had the ending "spend" to indicate the town of that bias. However, these deductions remain in the anthropological studies of the native peoples of the region as provisional hypotheses, since in the absence of precise references it could be argued that the Kakana language expresses a situation of multilingualism. As it is not possible to know for sure if the ending "gasta", used in the local toponymy and simply translated as town, has the same value or differs in its origin from other endings assigned to the kakán such as "ao", "pis" or "bis", The topic is still an open debate. In the same way, it is not known whether the shuffled ethnonyms refer to autonyms with which these peoples called themselves or were exonyms with which other Diaguita factions knew these peoples. Historical and anthropological studies are adopting a more localized view of the political organization that structures the notions of ethnicity of each partiality for this region of the continent.

The crude historical evidence that reaches us today through the documentation made by officials of the colonial government who failed to see the differences in the sociopolitical structures of the various groups has made any ethnic delimitation of where the supposed border between all these groups passes difficult. It would even be contrary to plotting it on a map. However, the Yacampis identity in historical records has remained distinguishable from other neighboring Kakana-speaking ethnic identities, such as the Capayanes (located from the Bermejo River to the Jachal River region in San Juan, the Guandacol and Famatina valleys in La Rioja, up to the Andes mountain range in the south of Catamarca), or La Olongasta, towards the Llanos Riojanos.

== Way of Subsistence ==
The first chronicles of the conquerors of the area (such as that of Gerónimo de Bibar made in 1551), mention that the human groups that lived in the Bermejo valley and in Valle Fértil were very numerous and lived fundamentally from llama farming, complemented with the collection and practice of agriculture with irrigation. Recent historical research indicates that the development of these activities allowed these indigenous people to be employed in the Spanish estancias as breeders and caretakers of livestock, with the Hispanic rule beginning in the 17th century, establishing a form of specialization in this type of work in the region. In turn, this caused references to their trades to be adopted over time in the surnames of local residents.

The technology of these people used the stone in arrowheads, axes, knives, scrapers, beads for necklaces and pipes. Their way of subsistence was based on hunting and agriculture of pumpkin, corn and other products of the land. Proof of this is the pottery culture that they developed.

== Extinct indigenous peoples of Argentina ==
The Yacampis people met their end during the first half of the 17th century, when Yacampis and Capayanes joined the aboriginal uprising in northwestern Argentina led by Cacique Chelemín, known in historiography as the "Great Diaguita Uprising" (Gran Alanzamiento Diaguita).

What happened to the Yacampis people is poorly documented, with the few existing records referring to the ancient indigenous peoples of Valle Fértil. Since the last decade of the 16th century, when the Spanish outpost based in San Juan de la Frontera began to enter the region known as Chaj-Paj-Nai (current Department of Valle Fértil, a name that alludes to its former designation in native language), little by little the colonization of the region recruited its original inhabitants in the first colonial encomiendas, in which the Crown granted the colonizers and conquerors indigenous grants, forming the contingents of labor that would work in the first colonial estates.

Later, around 1600, the Society of Jesus settled in the region, influencing the process of acculturation of the yacampis, turning them into Christians. Despite the Jesuit insistence on indigenous evangelization, the yacampi cults were not supplanted by Christian dogma, but were adapted in a religious syncretism in which original cultural patterns are reproduced to this day. An example is the cult of La Patroncita, in Villa San Agustín de Jauregui, where the Catholic faith is completed with indigenous myths, even the place where it is installed today is neighboring the old town of Aguaca, located in the old town. of indians.

The first interethnic conflicts between Spaniards and yacampis occurred during this time, when the encomendados Indians rebelled in 1604 because the encomendero Toribio de Dueñas exploited and mistreated the indigenous people. The yacampis uprising produced the execution of the settler and the looting of the hacienda located in Las Tumanas. The response of the peninsulars was immediate and was exemplary. On December 23, 1604, some caciques of Valle Fértil were punished for murdering their encomendero and other Spaniards: "Summarizing the group of prisoners, with the rapid and executive formalities of the military trial on the battlefield, seventeen of them were sentenced. them whom, after having ordered them to confess and buy bulls to absolve them for them, he had them put to death and ordered them to be put in the square of this city (San Juan) on a gallows with four pillars, all consecutively hanging by the neck and in a pillar of said gallows a sign with large letters that said: FOR TRAITORS TO THE ROYAL CROWN. And having had them hanged all day, he ordered them to be removed and their heads cut off and the other Indians, after having put the most aggressors in prison, he made them a parliament giving them to understand that they were forgiven in the name of His Majesty and that they should not leave a point where they wanted to locate them and make a population, which had to be near the city."

This was the beginning of a process of repression and bullying of the native populations of the region, which was followed by others of lesser importance. In 1634 the last yacampis of Valle Fértil joined the uprising led by the titakin of Andalgalá, Juan Chelemín. Once the rebellion was put down in 1640, the rebellious towns were exterminated and the survivors denatured.

== Ethnocide of Yacampis ==
Dominated first by the Incas and then by the Spanish, this people has put up resistance to each conquering advance in their domains, building their identity as indomitable people. With military repression and cultural persecution, the residents were evicted to other territories by being forcibly relocated to the outskirts of San Juan. Some suffered uprooting when transferred to Chile or fled to avoid its domination. Others, on the other hand, assimilated into the culture of the conquerors through miscegenation and lost their identity for generations.

In order to develop a general study of the formation of current ethnic identities among the original Argentine peoples, the history of the extinction of the indigenous peoples of Argentina must be completed with the history of the ethnocide of the indigenous peoples of Tucumán and the country of Cuyo. at the hands of colonial forces.

== Bibliography ==
- Bayer, Osvaldo "Historia de la crueldad argentina" Ediciones El Tugurio, Buenos Aires, 2010
- Canals Frau, Salvador "Poblaciones indígenas de la Argentina" Editorial Sudamericana, Buenos Aires, 1940.
- Grondona & Ardissone: "Los aborígenes de Valle Fértil" Facultad de Filosofía y Letras. 1953, Buenos Aires.
- Jofre, Ivana Carina "Los pájaros nocturnos de la Historia. Una arqueología indígena de las sociedades capayanas del norte de San Juan". Tesis doctoral de la Universidad Nacional de Catamarca, 2013.
- Michieli, Catalina Teresa "Capayanes y yacampis en San Juan" En revista Ansilta de Arqueología y Humanidades. Nº 5, San Juan, Ansilta Editora, pp. 34–35
- Rodríguez Mamby, Luis "Etnicidad, territorio y sociedad de Consumo en Valle Fértil (Provincia de San Juan)" Tesis de licenciatura de la Universidad de Buenos Aires, 2018
