= Anjullón =

Coordinates: 28°43′S 66°56′W

- Municipality and village
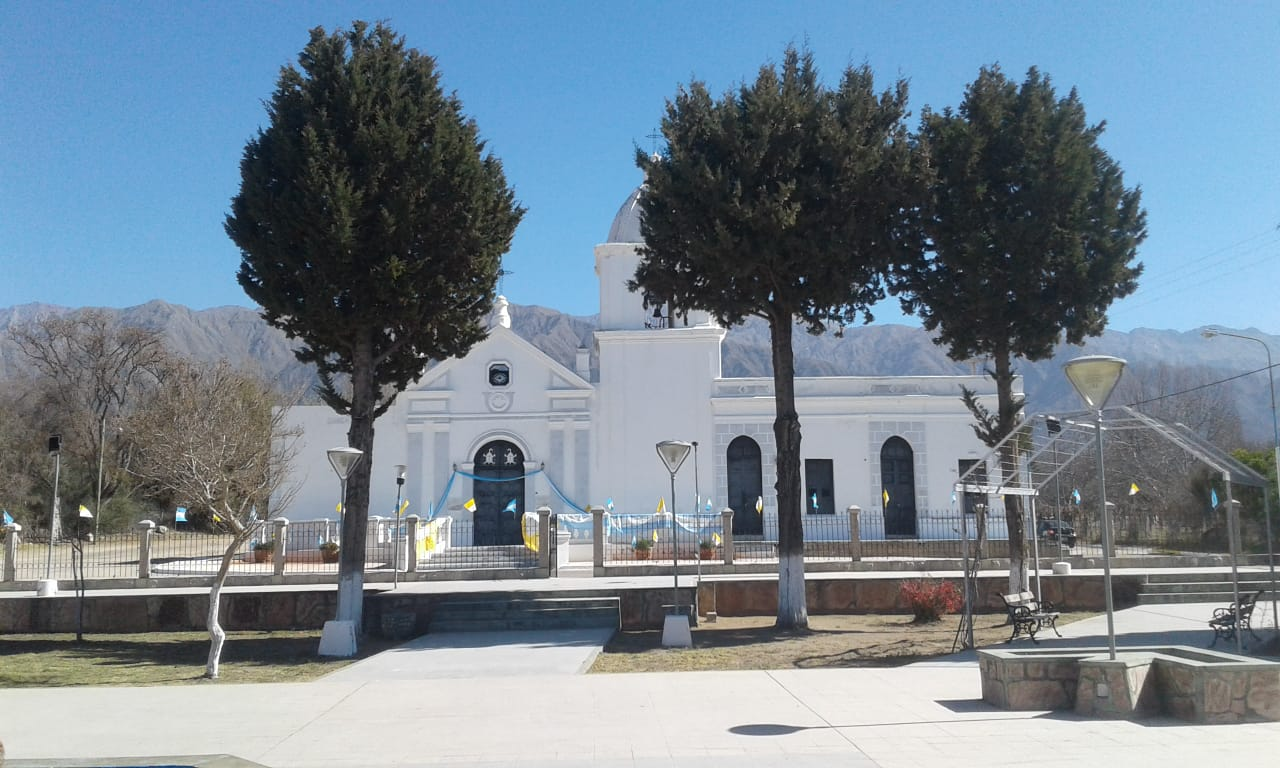
- Plaza de Anjullón
- Interactive map of Anjullón
- Country: Argentina
- Province: La Rioja Province

Anjullón is a municipality and village in La Rioja Province in northwestern Argentina.
