= Santa Cruz, La Rioja =

Coordinates: 28°27′S 67°41′W

Santa Cruz (La Rioja)
- Municipality and village
- Interactive map of Santa Cruz (La Rioja)
- Country: Argentina
- Province: La Rioja Province
- Time zone: UTC−3 (ART)
- Climate: BWk

Santa Cruz (La Rioja) is a municipality and village in La Rioja Province in northwestern Argentina.
