= Plaza Vieja, La Rioja =

Plaza Vieja (La Rioja)
- Municipality and village
- Location within Argentina
- Coordinates: 28°59′S 67°31′W
- Country: Argentina
- Province: La Rioja
- Time zone: UTC−3 (ART)

Plaza Vieja (La Rioja) is a municipality and village in La Rioja Province in northwestern Argentina.
