= Colonia Ortiz de Ocampo =

Coordinates: 30°57′47″S 66°10′37″W

- Municipality and village
- Interactive map of Colonia Ortiz de Ocampo
- Country: Argentina
- Province: La Rioja Province
- Time zone: UTC−3 (ART)

Colonia Ortiz de Ocampo is a municipality and village in La Rioja Province in northwestern Argentina.
