= Malanzán =

Coordinates: 30°48′S 66°37′W

- Municipality and town
- Interactive map of Malanzán
- Country: Argentina
- Province: La Rioja Province
- Time zone: UTC−3 (ART)
- Climate: BSk

Malanzán is a small town and municipality in La Rioja Province in northwestern Argentina.
