= Chaupihuasi =

Coordinates: 28°20′53″S 67°04′52″W

- Municipality and village
- Interactive map of Chaupihuasi
- Country: Argentina
- Province: La Rioja Province
- Time zone: UTC−3 (ART)

Chaupihuasi is a municipality and village in La Rioja Province in northwestern Argentina.
