= Famatina mining protests =

2011 mining conflict in La Rioja, Argentina

The Famatina mining protests opposed gold mining in La Rioja, Argentina beginning in 2011.

Osisko Mining Corporation, based in Montreal, Canada, signed an agreement in August 2011 with La Rioja's state mining corporation “Energia y Minerales Sociedad del Estado”(ESME) to develop the Famatina gold project. This project would cover an area of 40 km^{2} in the Famatina Mountain Range. Osisko agreed to pay US$500 000 to ESME within 15 days of the signing and invest $US 10 million within the first year of exploration. The terms also stated the division of profits from the project; 70% for Osisko, 30% for ESME.

== Politics ==
Provincial Governor Luis Beder Herrera was elected in March 2007 on an anti-mining platform. In 2008 however, Governor Herrera supported the repeal of the Provincial Laws Nº 8137 & 8138, passed in 2007, which banned open-pit mineral mining and the use of cyanide, mercury and any other contaminant in mining activities in La Rioja. He is a supporter of Osisko's project.

The Mayor of Famatina, Ismael Bardogaray, strongly opposed Osisko's presence in Famatina and the development of any mining activity for the region. In January 2012, he contacted President Cristina Fernandez de Kirchner for support, but to no avail.

== Protests ==
Residents of Famatina began to protest in August 2011, when the agreement for development was signed.

On January 2, 2012, residents initiated a roadblock to prevent the Osisko Mining Corporation from accessing the mountain range, anticipating the exploration activities which were scheduled to begin on January 16, 2012. Despite intimidation tactics used by Provincial Governor Herrera, the demonstrators stood their ground until Osisko suspended the project on January 30, 2012.

Protesters, including the Mayor of Famatina, Ismael Bardogaray, the local Priest, and an estimated 50% of Famatina's population of roughly 7000, expressed their concern regarding the depletion and pollution of their scarce water resources and massive environmental destruction, common outcomes of open-pit gold mines which use the gold cyanidation process. Protesters were not interested in negotiating royalties. “The people of Famatina do not see mining as a development option for our region”, stated Bardogaray.

Demonstrations in support of the people of Famatina erupted across the country. In Buenos Aires, hundreds protested around the Obelisk (the national monument), and in front of the Canadian Embassy. In the capital of La Rioja, 10 000 people gathered before the Provincial Government House, demanding the cancellation of the Famatina Project, or the resignation of Beder Herrera otherwise.

== Repression and blacklist ==
On December 16, 2011, representatives of the Osisko Mining Corporation accidentally left behind files following a meeting with members of the municipal government. These files were identified to be a “black list”, or list of names of people actively involved in the opposition to the mining project. The list included information such as their age and profession, and whether they were ‘leaders’ or ‘protagonists’ of the opposition. Following the discovery of the list, Osisko representatives maintained that they had the “right to adequate information for decision-making” and that the information on the list was required for “transparency”.

In response to the roadblock in January, Governor Herrera sent in a local police squad, which did not engage in repressive action against the protesters. Herrera then sent a specialized anti-riot squad. This prompted Nobel Laureate Adolfo Perez Esquivel to write to the governor a letter, reminding him of the population's right to protest and warning him against the use of repression.

== Suspension ==
On January 30, 2012, the Osisko Mining Corporation announced that they would suspend exploration activities due to “community protests and media reports and requests.”

In a press release, Osisko denied claims of a “mega-mining” project, and explained that the project is not a mining project, but an exploration project at this point. The press release stated: “If there is no social license for exploration and development around the Famatina project area, no work will be conducted.” Osisko also stressed their commitment to socially and environmentally sound exploration methods. They are planning a community consultation program and hope to reassure residents of Famatina about the potential environmental and economic impacts a mining project in their area could have.

In July 2013, the La Rioja province government rescinded the concession for the gold mine.
