= Bajo Carrizal =

Coordinates: 28°53′S 67°33′W

- Municipality and village
- Interactive map of Bajo Carrizal
- Country: Argentina
- Province: La Rioja Province
- Time zone: UTC−3 (ART)

Bajo Carrizal is a municipality and village in La Rioja Province in northwestern Argentina.
