= Chañarmuyo =

Coordinates: 28°36′S 67°34′W

- Municipality and village
- Interactive map of Chañarmuyo
- Country: Argentina
- Province: La Rioja Province
- Time zone: UTC−3 (ART)

Chañarmuyo is a municipality and village in La Rioja Province in northwestern Argentina.
