= Santo Domingo, La Rioja =

Coordinates: 28°33′S 67°40′W

Santo Domingo (La Rioja, Argentina)
- Municipality and village
- Interactive map of Santo Domingo (La Rioja, Argentina)
- Country: Argentina
- Province: La Rioja Province
- Time zone: UTC−3 (ART)
- Climate: BSh

Santo Domingo (La Rioja, Argentina) is a municipality and village in La Rioja Province in northwestern Argentina.
