= Salicas =

Coordinates: 28°22′S 67°03′W

- Municipality and village
- Interactive map of Salicas
- Country: Argentina
- Province: La Rioja Province
- Time zone: UTC−3 (ART)
- Climate: BWh

Salicas is a municipality and village in La Rioja Province in northwestern Argentina.
