= Santa Vera Cruz, La Rioja =

Coordinates: 28°40′23″S 66°57′36″W

Santa Vera Cruz (La Rioja)
- Municipality and village
- Interactive map of Santa Vera Cruz (La Rioja)
- Country: Argentina
- Province: La Rioja Province
- Time zone: UTC−3 (ART)

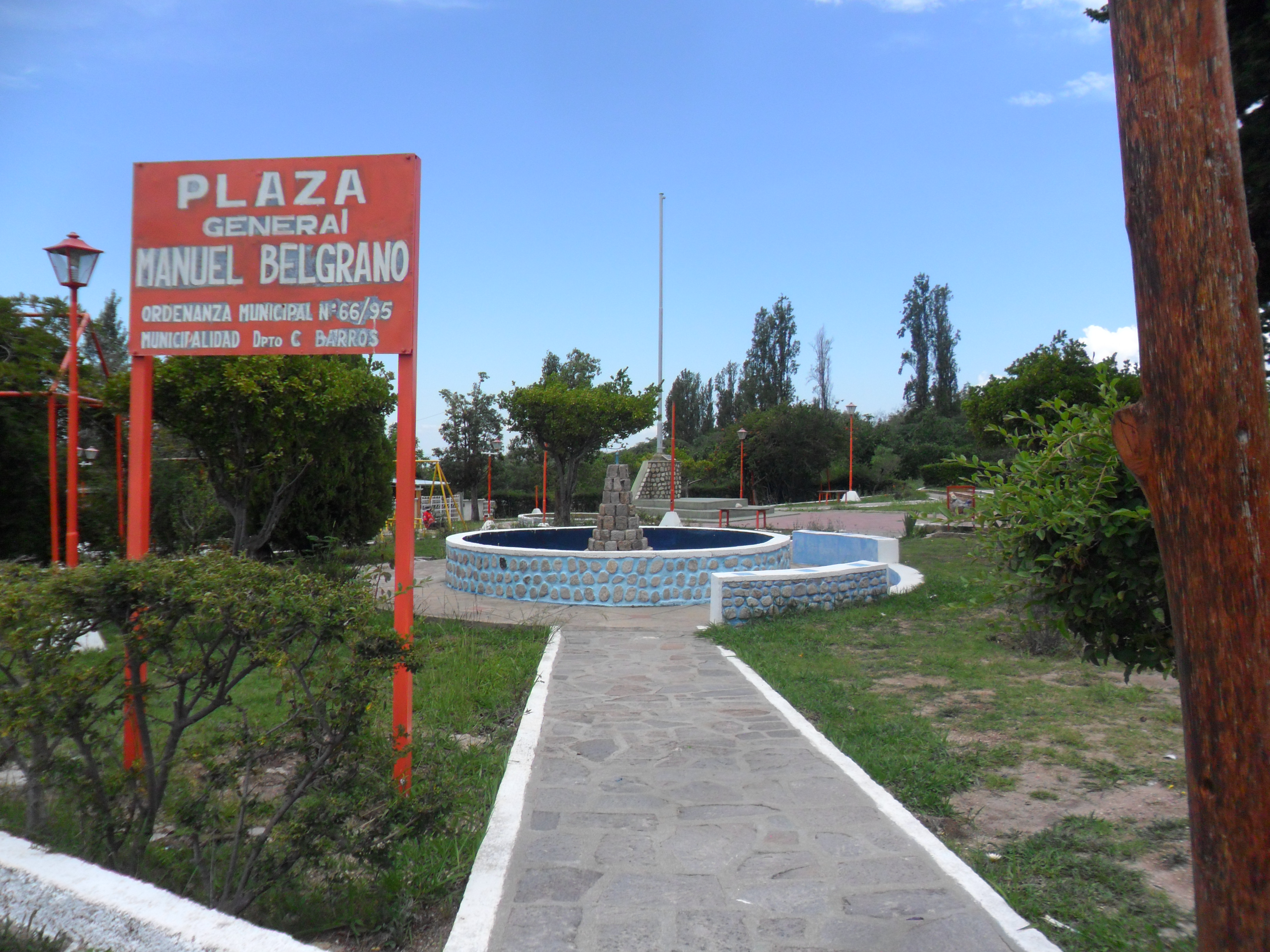
Manuel Belgrano Plaza in Santa Vera Cruz, La Rioja

Santa Vera Cruz (La Rioja) is a municipality and village in La Rioja Province in northwestern Argentina.
