= Sanagasta Department =

Sanagasta Departamento Sanagasta
- Department
- Flag
- Interactive map of Sanagasta
- Country: Argentina
- Seat: Villa Sanagasta

Area
  - Total: 1,711 km^{2} (661 sq mi)

Population (2022)
  - Total: 3,038
  - Density: 1.776/km^{2} (4.599/sq mi)

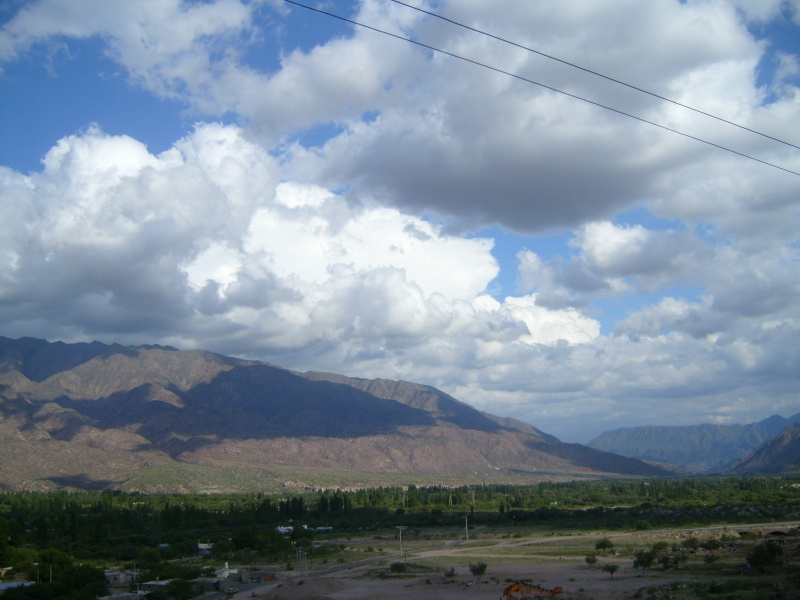
Sanagasta

Sanagasta is a department of the province of La Rioja (Argentina).
