= Shaqui =

Coordinates: 28°28′S 67°08′W

- Municipality and village
- Interactive map of Shaqui
- Country: Argentina
- Province: La Rioja Province
- Time zone: UTC−3 (ART)

Shaqui is a municipality and village in La Rioja Province in northwestern Argentina.
