= Ángulos =

Coordinates: 28°38′S 67°38′W

- Municipality and village
- Interactive map of Ángulos
- Country: Argentina
- Province: La Rioja Province
- Time zone: UTC−3 (ART)

Ángulos is a municipality and village in La Rioja Province in northwestern Argentina.
