= San Pedro, La Rioja =

Coordinates: 28°39′S 66°57′W

San Pedro (La Rioja)
- Municipality and village
- Interactive map of San Pedro (La Rioja)
- Country: Argentina
- Province: La Rioja Province
- Time zone: UTC−3 (ART)

San Pedro (La Rioja) is a municipality and village in La Rioja Province in northwestern Argentina, known for its proximity to mountainous terrain and scenic, arid landscapes.
