= Famatina =

- Town
- Location of Famatina in Argentina
- Coordinates: 28°55′S 67°31′W
- Country: Argentina
- Province: La Rioja
- Department: Famatina

Government
  - Intendant: Adriana Del Valle Olima

Population
  - Total: 6,371
- Time zone: UTC−3 (ART)
- CPA base: F5365
- Dialing code: +54 3825
- Climate: BWk

Famatina is a town in the province of La Rioja, Argentina. It has 6,371 inhabitants as per the 2001 census [INDEC], and is the only municipality in the Famatina Department. Located in a fertile valley between Sierra de Famatina and Sierra de Velasco, Famatina's economy revolves around jojoba and olive agriculture and tourism.

The town developed from a pre-Hispanic settlement in the Inca Empire, and whose indigenous inhabitants have been recognised as Diaguitas. The site of Famatina was first explored by Spaniards in 1592 when Juan Ramírez de Velazco arrived during his search for gold.

== Famatina mining protests ==
The Famatina mining protests opposed gold mining in La Rioja, Argentina beginning in 2011.

Osisko Mining Corporation, based in Montreal, Canada, signed an agreement in August 2011 with La Rioja's state mining corporation “Energia y Minerales Sociedad del Estado”(ESME) to develop the Famatina gold project. This project would cover an area of 40 km^{2} in the Famatina Mountain Range. Osisko agreed to pay US$500 000 to ESME within 15 days of the signing and invest $US 10 million within the first year of exploration. The terms also stated the division of profits from the project; 70% for Osisko, 30% for ESME.

== See also ==
- Famatinian orogeny
