= Alpasinche =

Coordinates: 28°19′S 67°03′W

- Municipality and village
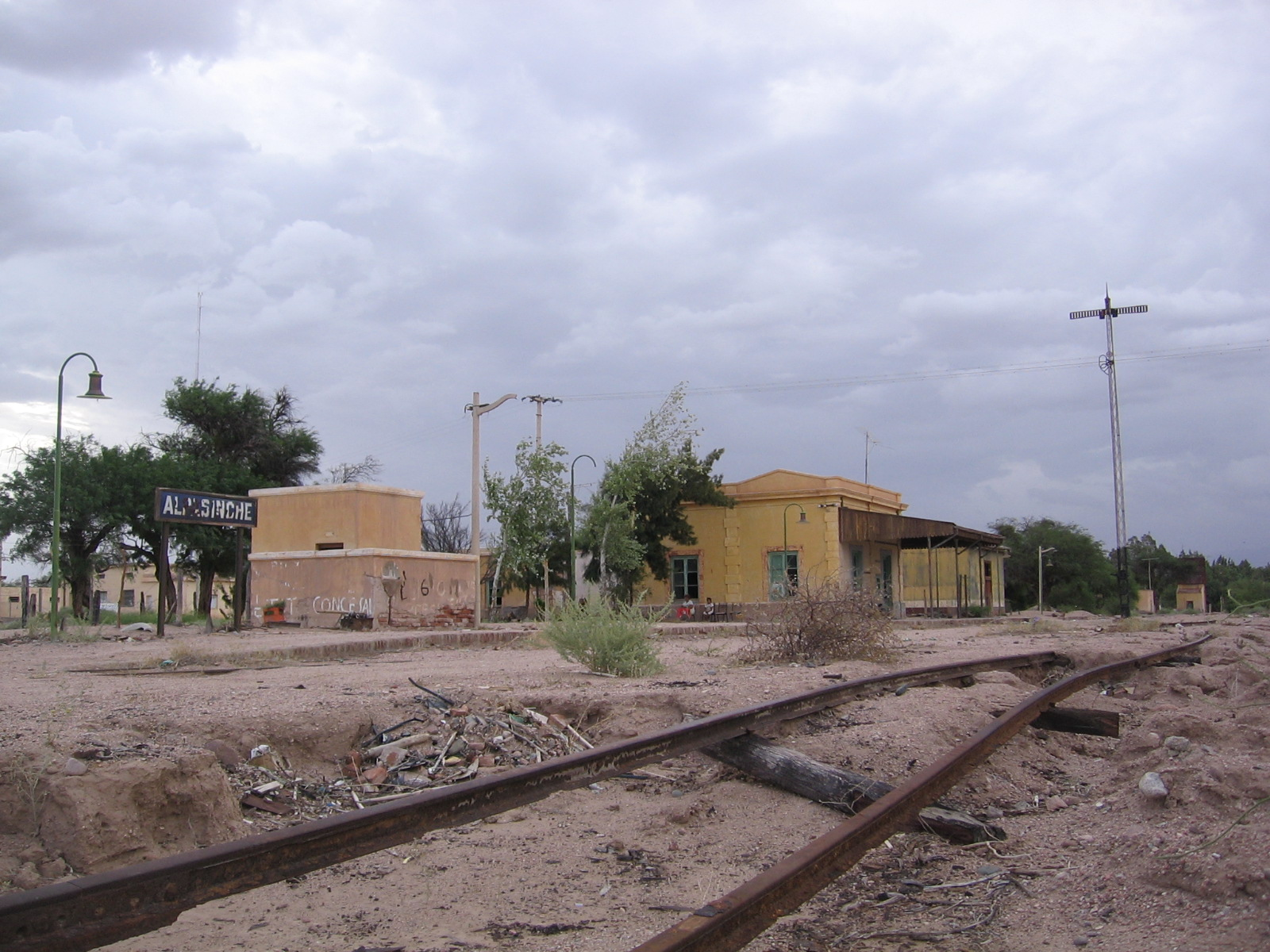
- Alpasinche train station of the abandoned A5 branch of the former Belgrano Railway
- Interactive map of Alpasinche
- Country: Argentina
- Province: La Rioja Province
- Time zone: UTC−3 (ART)
- Climate: BWh

Alpasinche is a municipality and village in La Rioja Province in northwestern Argentina.
