= Suriyaco =

Coordinates: 28°33′S 67°04′W

- Municipality and village
- Interactive map of Suriyaco
- Country: Argentina
- Province: La Rioja Province
- Time zone: UTC−3 (ART)
- Climate: BWk

Suriyaco is a municipality and village in La Rioja Province in northwestern Argentina.
