= Colonia Anguinán =

Coordinates: 29°12′S 67°28′W

- Municipality and village
- Interactive map of Colonia Anguinán
- Country: Argentina
- Province: La Rioja Province
- Time zone: UTC−3 (ART)

Colonia Anguinán is a municipality and village in La Rioja Province in northwestern Argentina.
