= Castro Barros Department =

Castro Barros Departamento Castro Barros
- Department
- Interactive map of Castro Barros
- Country: Argentina
- Seat: Aminga

Area
  - Total: 1,420 km^{2} (550 sq mi)

Population (2022)
  - Total: 5,810
  - Density: 4.09/km^{2} (10.6/sq mi)

Castro Barros is a department of the province of La Rioja (Argentina).
