= San Blas de los Sauces =

Coordinates: 28°23′S 67°04′W

- Municipality and village
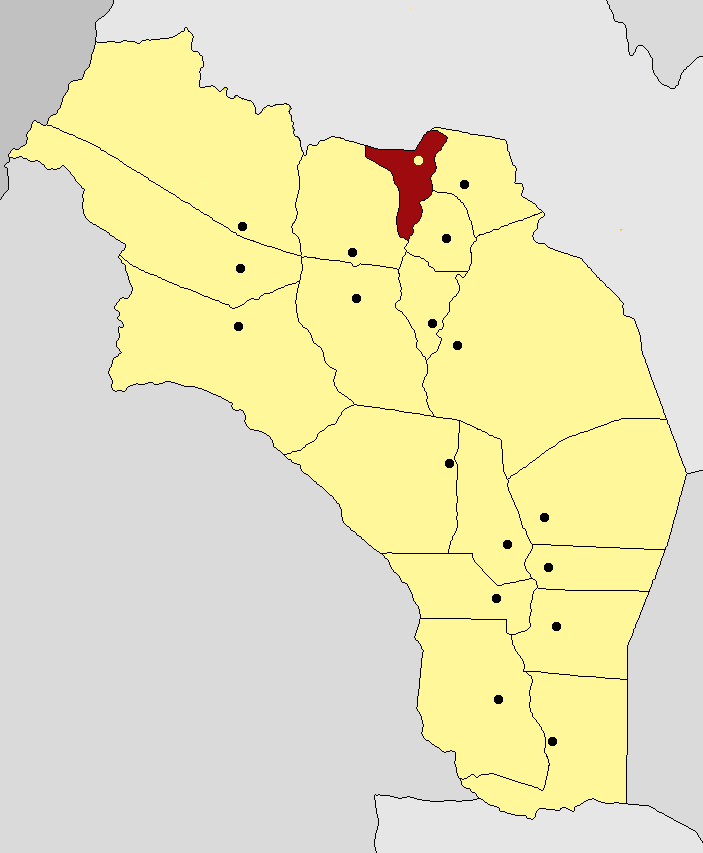
- Map Showing the location of San Blas de los Sauces Districts
- Interactive map of San Blas de los Sauces
- Country: Argentina
- Province: La Rioja Province
- Time zone: UTC−3 (ART)
- Climate: BWh

San Blas de los Sauces is a municipality and village in La Rioja Province, Argentina.
