= Santa Clara, La Rioja =

Coordinates: 29°33′S 68°31′W

Santa Clara (La Rioja)
- Municipality and village
- Interactive map of Santa Clara (La Rioja)
- Country: Argentina
- Province: La Rioja Province
- Time zone: UTC−3 (ART)

Santa Clara (La Rioja) is a municipality and village in La Rioja Province in northwestern Argentina.
