= Guandacol =

Coordinates: 29°31′S 68°33′W

- Municipality and village
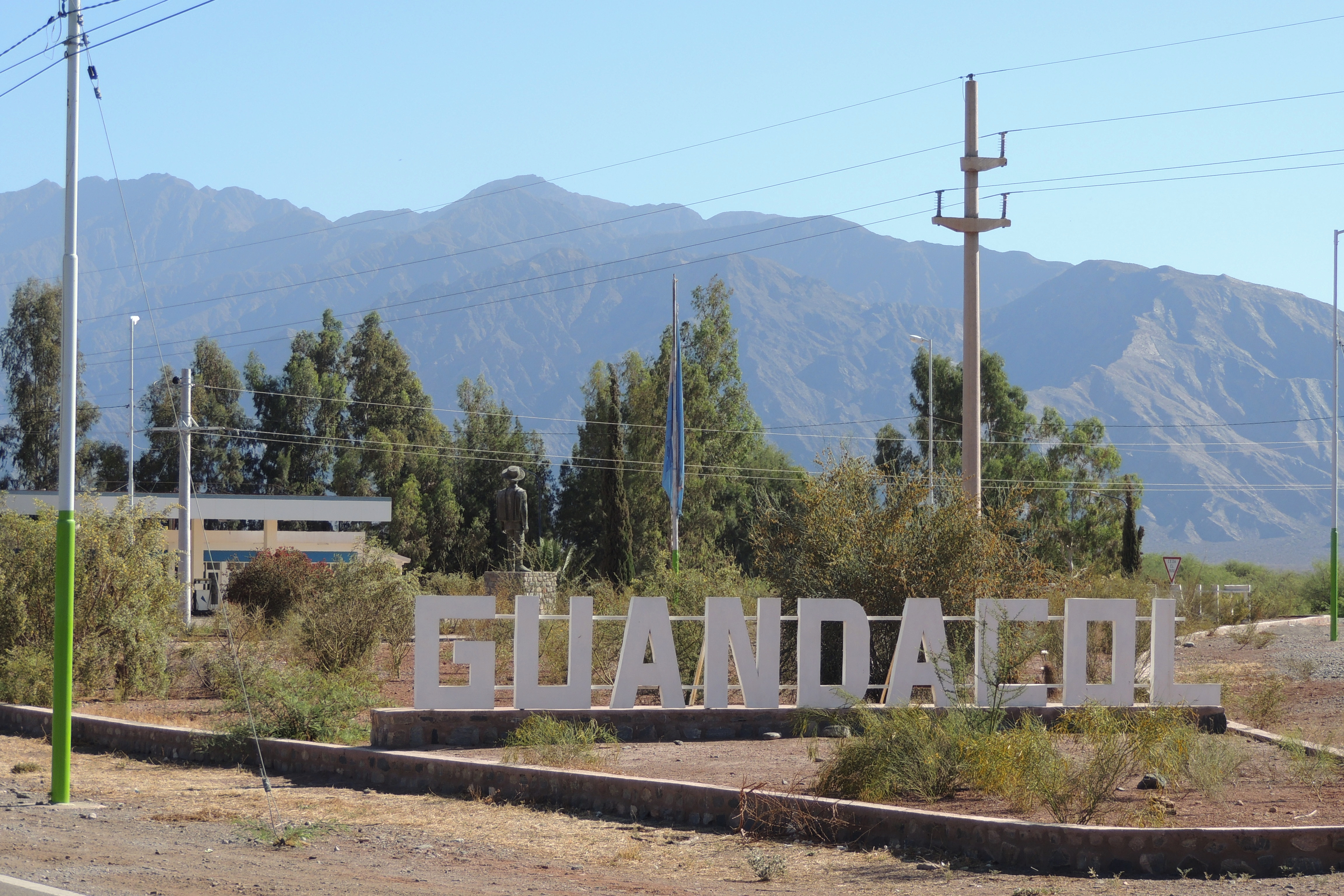
- Interactive map of Guandacol
- Country: Argentina
- Province: La Rioja Province
- Time zone: UTC−3 (ART)
- Climate: BWk

Guandacol is a municipality and village in La Rioja Province in northwestern Argentina.
