= Tama, La Rioja =

Coordinates: 30°31′S 66°32′W

Tama (La Rioja)
- Municipality and village
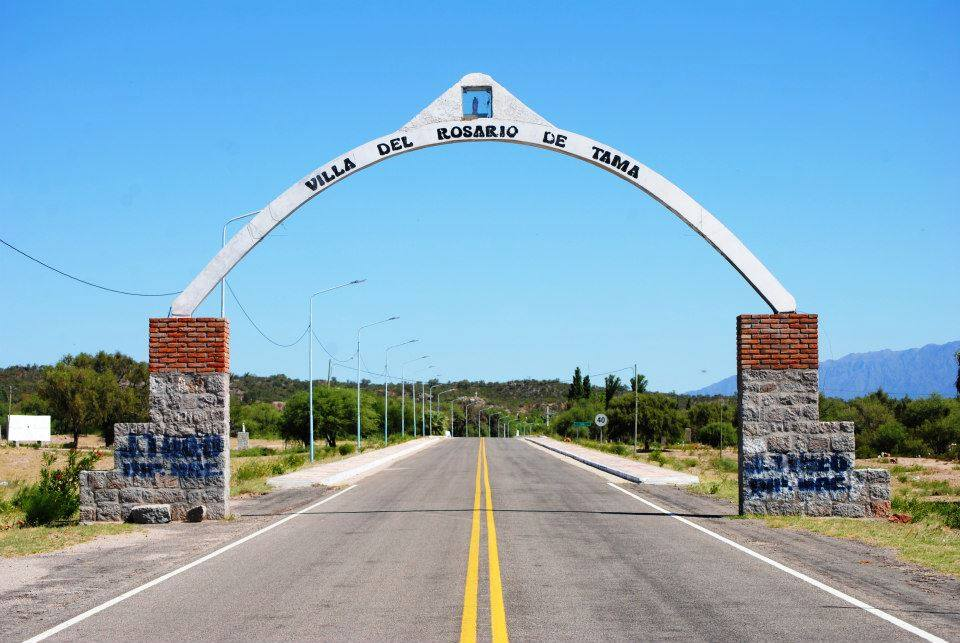
- Interactive map of Tama (La Rioja)
- Country: Argentina
- Province: La Rioja Province
- Time zone: UTC−3 (ART)
- Climate: BSh

Tama (La Rioja) is a municipality and village in La Rioja Province in northwestern Argentina.
