= Las Talas, La Rioja =

Coordinates: 28°23′17″S 67°04′34″W

Las Talas (La Rioja)
- Municipality and village
- Interactive map of Las Talas (La Rioja)
- Country: Argentina
- Province: La Rioja Province
- Time zone: UTC−3 (ART)

Las Talas (La Rioja) is a municipality and village in La Rioja Province in northwestern Argentina.
