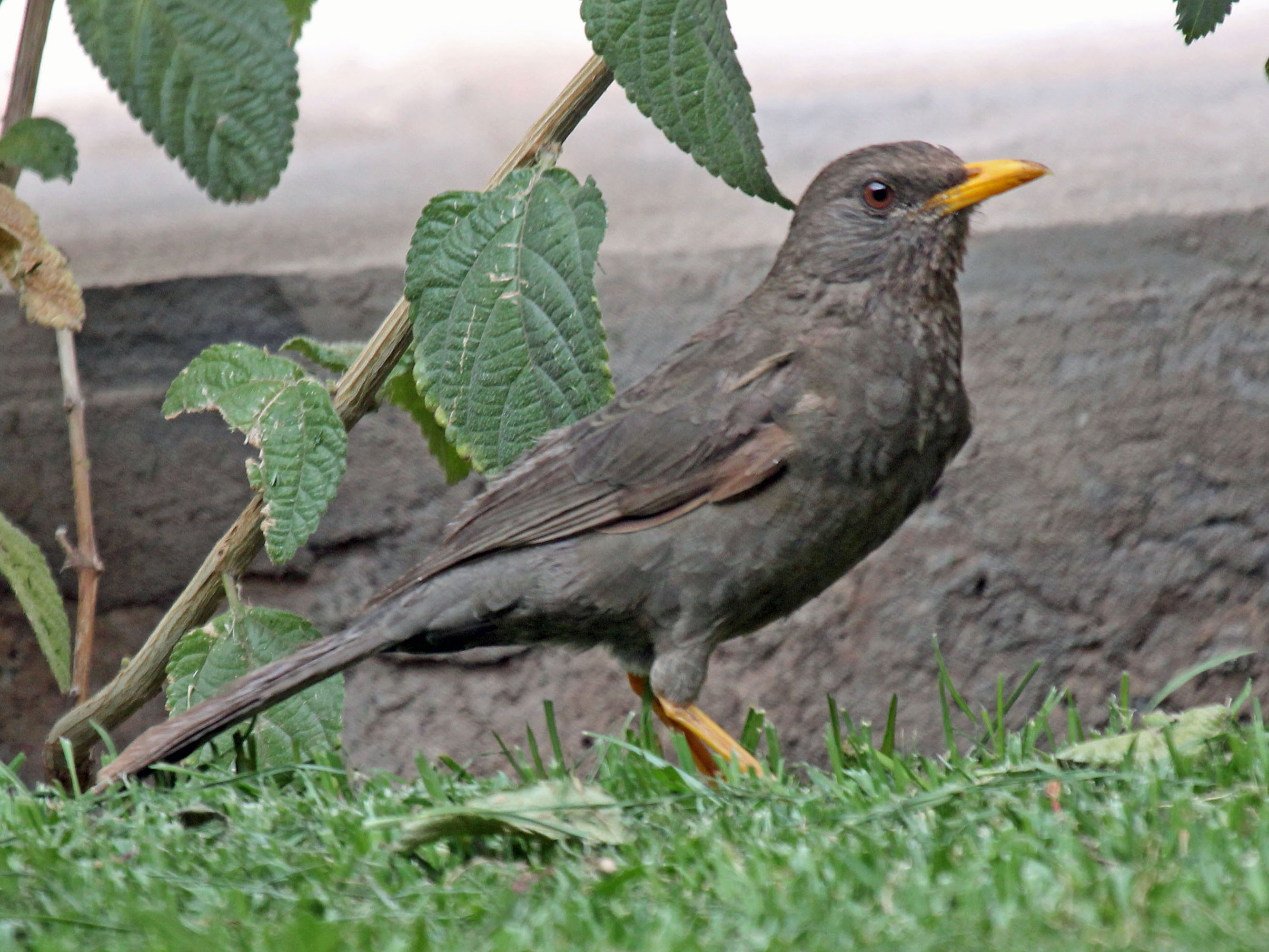

Conservation status
- Least Concern (IUCN 3.1)

- Least Concern (IUCN 3.1)

Scientific classification
- Kingdom: Animalia
- Phylum: Chordata
- Class: Aves
- Order: Passeriformes
- Family: Turdidae
- Genus: Turdus
- Species: T. chiguanco

Binomial name
- Turdus chiguanco d'Orbigny & Lafresnaye, 1837
- Range of T. c. chiguanco and T. c. conradi; see Taxonomy and Distribution sections.

= Chiguanco thrush =

Species of bird

The Chiguanco thrush (Turdus chiguanco) is a species of bird in the family Turdidae. It is found from Ecuador south to Argentina.

== Taxonomy and systematics ==
The Chiguanco thrush was originally described with its current binomial Turdus chiguanco.

The species' further taxonomy is unsettled. The IOC, AviList, the Clements taxonomy, and the independent South American Classification Committee assign it these three subspecies:

- T. c. chiguanco d'Orbigny & Lafresnaye, 1837
- T. c. conradi Salvadori & Festa, 1899
- T. c. anthracinus Burmeister, 1858

However, as of late 2025 BirdLife International's Handbook of the Birds of the World (HBW) treats T. c. anthracinus as a separate species, the "sombre thrush". Clements does recognize some distinctions within the species by calling the first two subspecies the "Chiguanco Thrush (chiguanco/conradi)" and the third the "Chiguanco Thrush (anthracinus)". In addition, some authors have included T. c. conradi within T. c. chiguanco.

This article follows the three-subspecies model.

== Description ==
The Chiguanco thrush is 25 to 30 cm (9.8 to 12 in) long and weighs 75 to 120 g (2.6 to 4.2 oz). Adults of both sexes of the nominate subspecies T. c. chiguanco have a plain olive gray-brown head and upperparts, wings, and tail. Their underparts are slightly paler. They have a red to chestnut iris, a yellow bill, and yellow legs and feet. Juveniles are dull grayish olive with browner wings and tail than adults. They have pale spots on the wing coverts, pale buff streaks on the back, and buff to brown spots and streaks on the underparts.

Subspecies T. c. conradi is larger and paler than the nominate but "not separable in the field". Adult males of T. c. anthracinus are almost entirely sooty black with a slightly paler throat and underparts. They have a yellow eye-ring and orange-yellow bill, legs, and feet. Adult females are overall dark brown or grayish brown with little difference between the upper- and underparts. Their eye-ring, bill, legs, and feet are paler than those of the male. Juveniles are warm brown that is darker above than below with chestnut spots on the wing coverts and pale spots and streaks on the underparts.

== Distribution and habitat ==
The Chiguanco thrush has a disjunct distribution. The nominate subspecies is found from Pichincha Province in north-central Ecuador south to central Peru. Subspecies T. c. conradi is found from coastal Peru east into western Bolivia and south into extreme northern Chile. T. c. anthracinus is found from central Bolivia and northeastern Chile south to west-central Argentina with perhaps an extension from the last into central Chile.

The Chiguanco thrush inhabits a variety of dry, somewhat open, landscapes. These include agricultural areas with scattered trees, gardens, scrubby deciduous woodland, thickets, montane scrublands, and Polylepis woodlands. Within them it often is along watercourses or in irrigated areas. In elevation in Ecuador it mostly ranges between 1,500 and 3,200 m (4,900 and 10,500 ft). In Peru it mostly is found above 1,600 m (5,200 ft) on the western Andean slope but occurs locally down to sea level. On the eastern slope it mostly is found between 2,400 and 4,300 m (7,900 and 14,100 ft) but has records down to 1,300 m (4,300 ft). In Bolivia it mostly occurs between 700 and 3,500 m (2,300 and 11,500 ft) but is known down to 550 m (1,800 ft).

== Behavior ==
=== Movement ===
The two more northerly subspecies of the Chiguanco thrush are believed to be sedentary year-round residents. Subspecies T. c. anthracinus appears to be at least somewhat migratory, as its numbers in any given area greatly fluctuate with the seasons.

=== Feeding ===
The Chiguanco thrush feeds on insects, spiders, earthworms, and fruit. It usually is found alone or in pairs. It forages on the ground.

=== Breeding ===
The Chiguanco thrush's breeding season has not been fully defined. However, it spans at least March to July in Ecuador, April to July in Peru, January to April in Bolivia, and October to January in Argentina. Little else is known about the two northern subspecies' breeding biology. T. c. anthracinus builds a cup nest from grass and thin twigs, often with moss and mud as well, and lined with softer fibers. The nest is typically in a small tree between about 1.2 and 6 m (4 and 20 ft) above the ground. The subspecies' clutch is two or three eggs that are pale greenish blue spotted and blotched with chestnut and gray. The female alone incubates, for 11 to 12 days. The time to fledging and other details of parental care are not known.

=== Vocalization ===
The Chiguanco thrush's song in Ecuador is described as "a rather simple melodic phrase repeated over and over, usually terminating in a jumble or twitter"; it is sung mostly at dawn and dusk. In Peru it is similarly described as "a rich and pleasant caroling series of 'typical thrush' song phrases with a somewhat echoing quality". The song of subspecies T. c. anthracinus is described as "a variable, rich, multisyllabic phrase of trills and modulated whistles". All three subspecies appear to have the same calls that include a "clucking duck-duck or sharp tchok-kiek" contact call, a "loud rapid tsi-tsi-tsi" as a flight call, and a "long-drawn, high-pitched wheen or kiiiu" when alarmed.

== Status ==
The IUCN follows HJBW taxonomy and so has separately assessed the Chiguanco sensu stricto and "sombre" thrushes. Both are assessed as being of Least Concern. The population size of neither is known and both are believed to be stable. No immediate threats to either have been identified. The species is considered "familiar and conspicuous" in Ecuador and "one of the most common and widespread thrushes" in Andean Peru. It is locally abundant in Bolivia and appears to be expanding its range southward in Argentina.

== Gallery ==
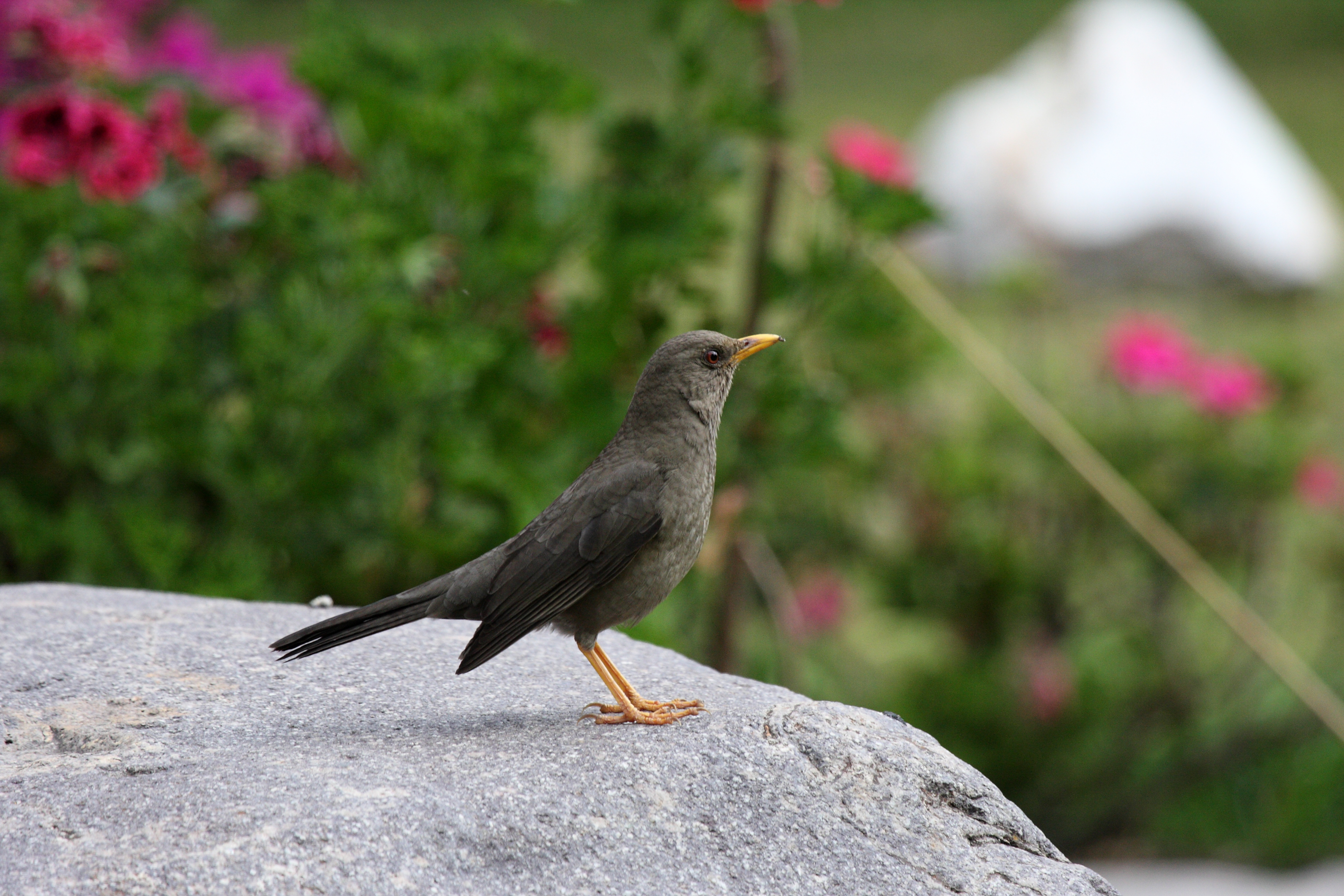
Adult T. c. chiguanco

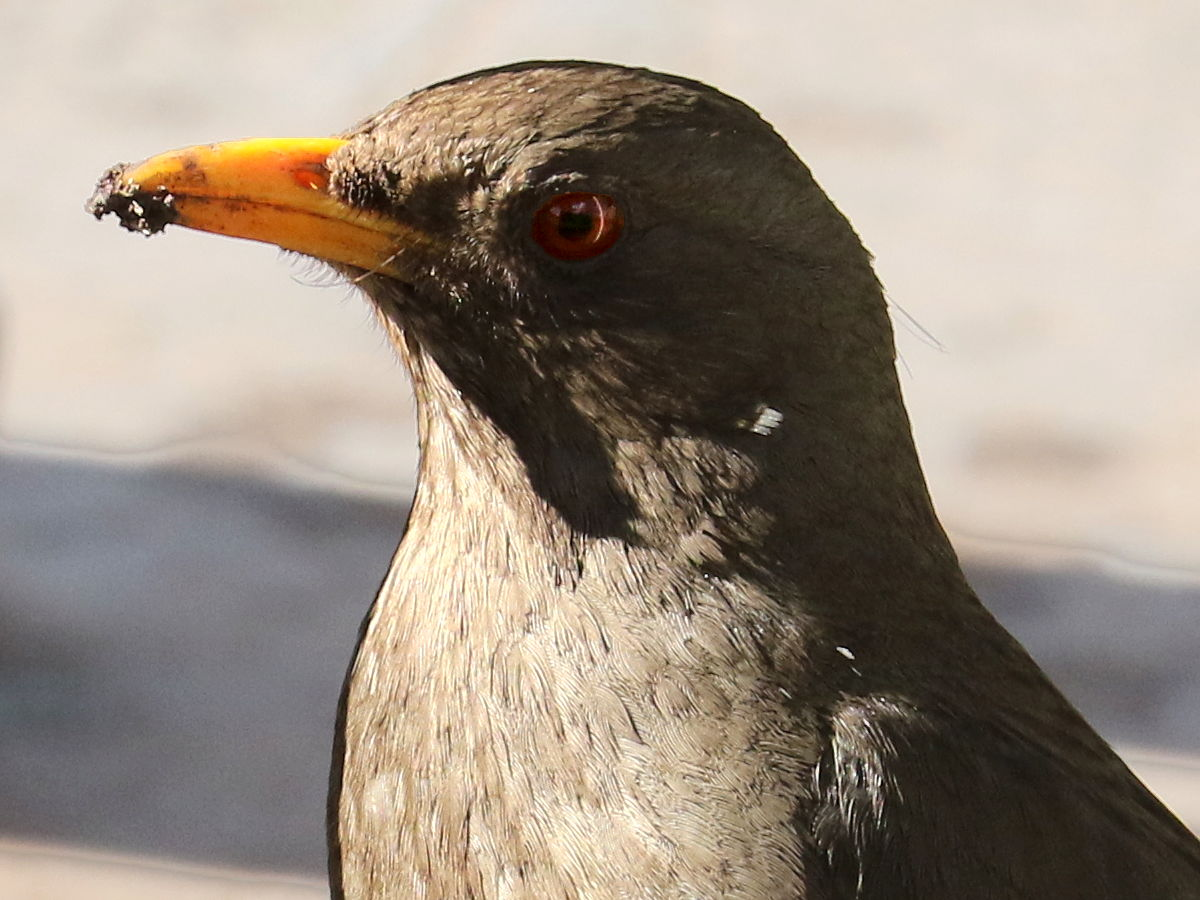
T. c. conradi in Cusco, Peru

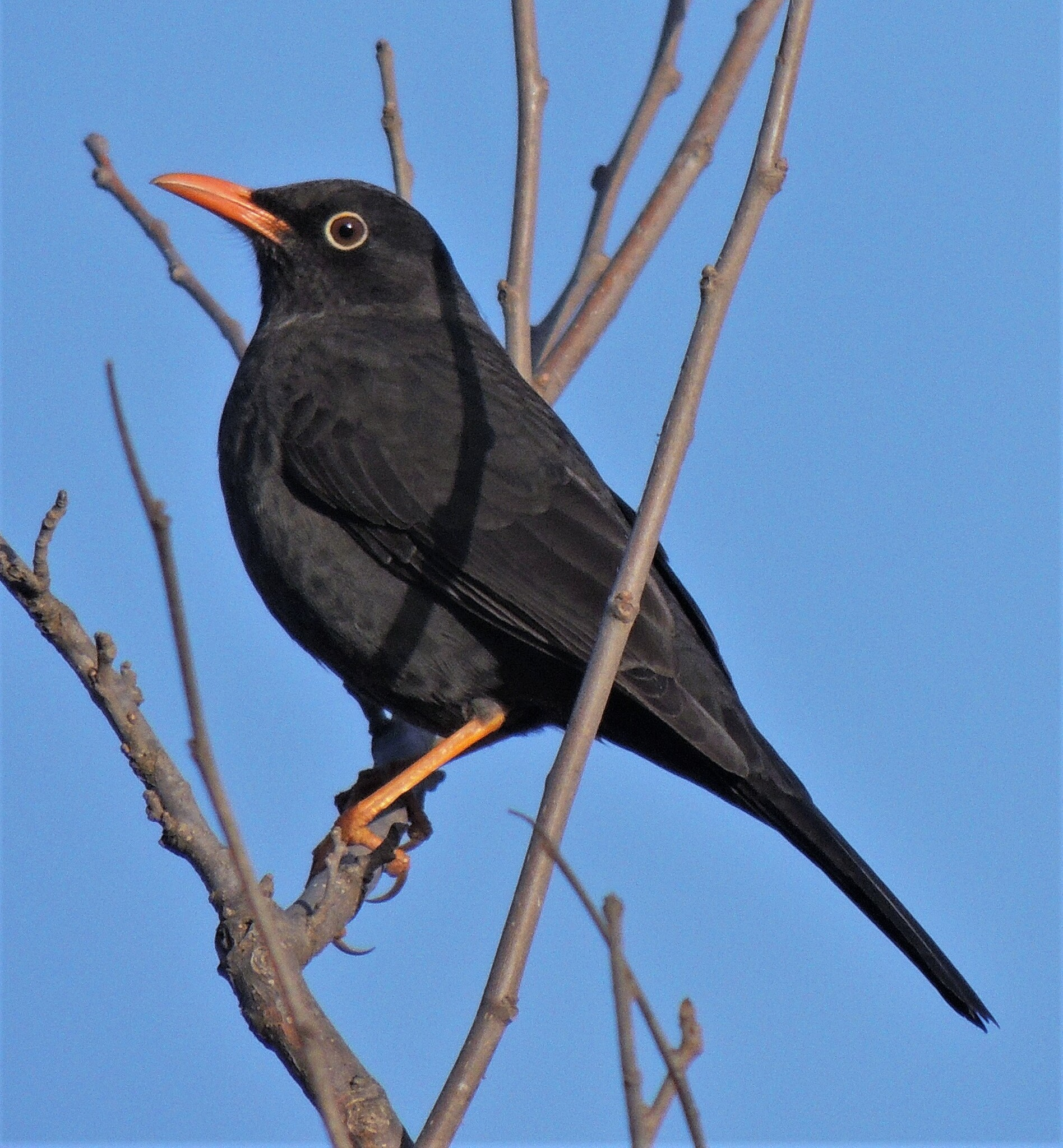
T. c. anthracinus in Argentina
