= Aicuña =

- Municipality and village
- Location in Argentina
- Coordinates: 29°31′S 67°45′W
- Country: Argentina
- Province: La Rioja Province
- Department: Coronel Felipe Varela
- Time zone: UTC−3 (ART)

Aicuña is a municipality and hamlet in La Rioja Province in northwestern Argentina.
