= Antinaco, La Rioja =

Coordinates: 28°49′S 67°19′W

Antinaco (La Rioja)
- Municipality and village
- Interactive map of Antinaco (La Rioja)
- Country: Argentina
- Province: La Rioja Province

Antinaco (La Rioja) is a municipality and village in La Rioja Province in northwestern Argentina.
