= Antinaco, Catamarca =

Coordinates: 27°12′S 67°36′W

Antinaco
- Municipality and village
- Interactive map of Antinaco
- Country: Argentina
- Province: Catamarca Province
- Time zone: UTC−3 (ART)

Antinaco is a village and municipality in Catamarca Province in northwestern Argentina.
