= Andolucas =

Coordinates: 28°35′S 67°11′W

- Municipality and village
- Interactive map of Andolucas
- Country: Argentina
- Province: La Rioja Province
- Time zone: UTC−3 (ART)

Andolucas is a municipality and village in La Rioja Province in northwestern Argentina.
