= Aminga =

Coordinates: 28°50′S 66°54′W

- Municipality and village
- Interactive map of Aminga
- Country: Argentina
- Province: La Rioja Province
- Time zone: UTC−3 (ART)

Aminga is a municipality and village in La Rioja Province in northwestern Argentina.
