= Cuipán =

Coordinates: 28°27′S 67°07′W

- Municipality and village
- Interactive map of Cuipán
- Country: Argentina
- Province: La Rioja Province
- Time zone: UTC−3 (ART)

Cuipán is a municipality and village in La Rioja Province in northwestern Argentina.
