= Los Palacios, La Rioja =

Coordinates: 29°22′S 68°11′W

Los Palacios (La Rioja)
- Municipality and village
- Interactive map of Los Palacios (La Rioja)
- Country: Argentina
- Province: La Rioja Province
- Time zone: UTC−3 (ART)
- Climate: BWk

Los Palacios (La Rioja) is a municipality and village in La Rioja Province in northwestern Argentina.
