= Ambil, La Rioja =

Coordinates: 31°08′S 66°21′W

Ambil
- Municipality and village
- Interactive map of Ambil
- Country: Argentina
- Province: La Rioja Province
- Time zone: UTC−3 (ART)
- Climate: BSh

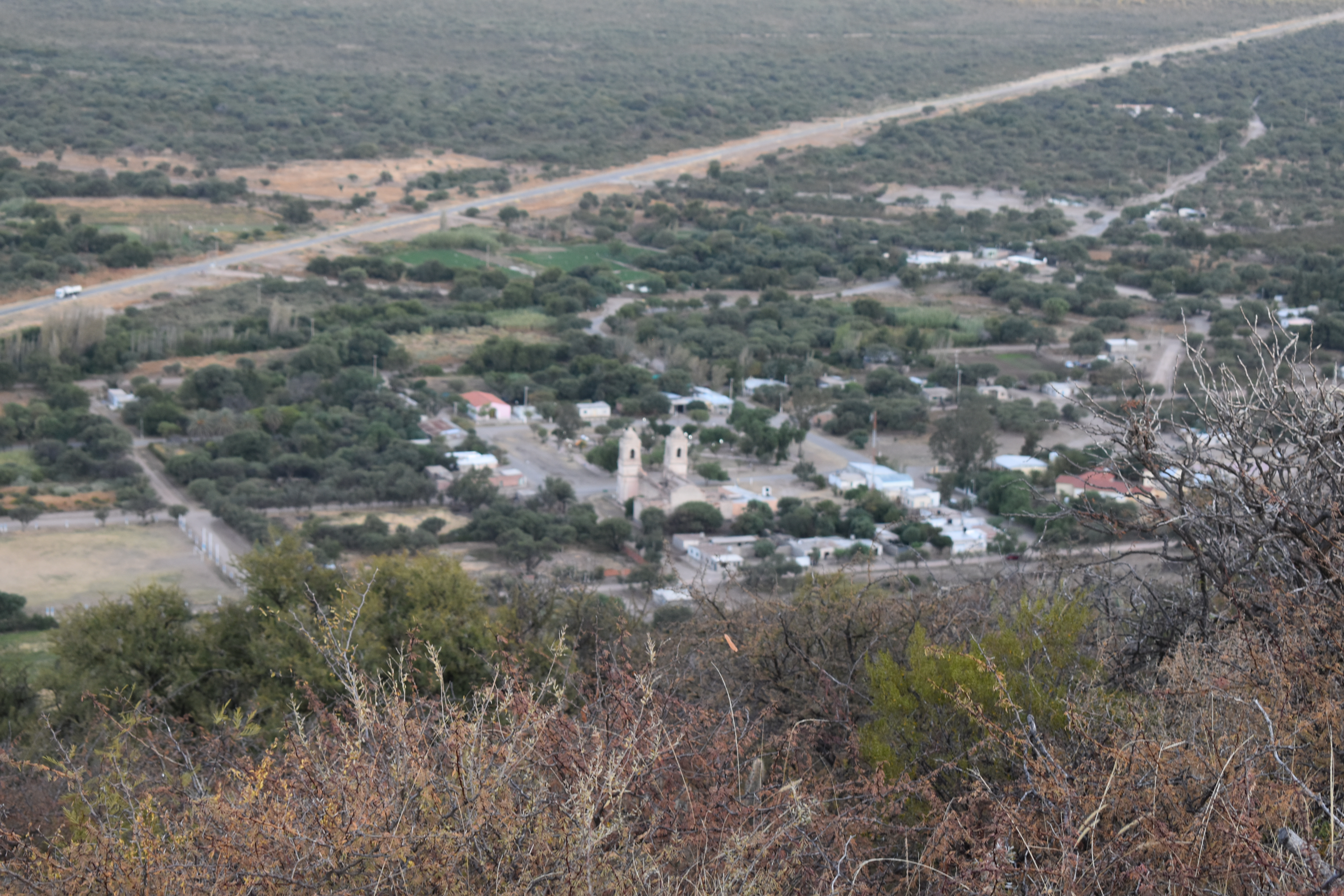
Panoramic view of Ambil.

Ambil is a municipality and village in La Rioja Province in northwestern Argentina.
