= Villa Sanagasta =

Coordinates: 29°16′S 67°01′W

- Municipality and village
- Interactive map of Villa Sanagasta
- Country: Argentina
- Province: La Rioja Province
- Time zone: UTC−3 (ART)

Villa Sanagasta is a municipality and village in La Rioja Province in northwestern Argentina.
