= Banda Florida =

Coordinates: 29°17′S 68°13′W

- Municipality and village
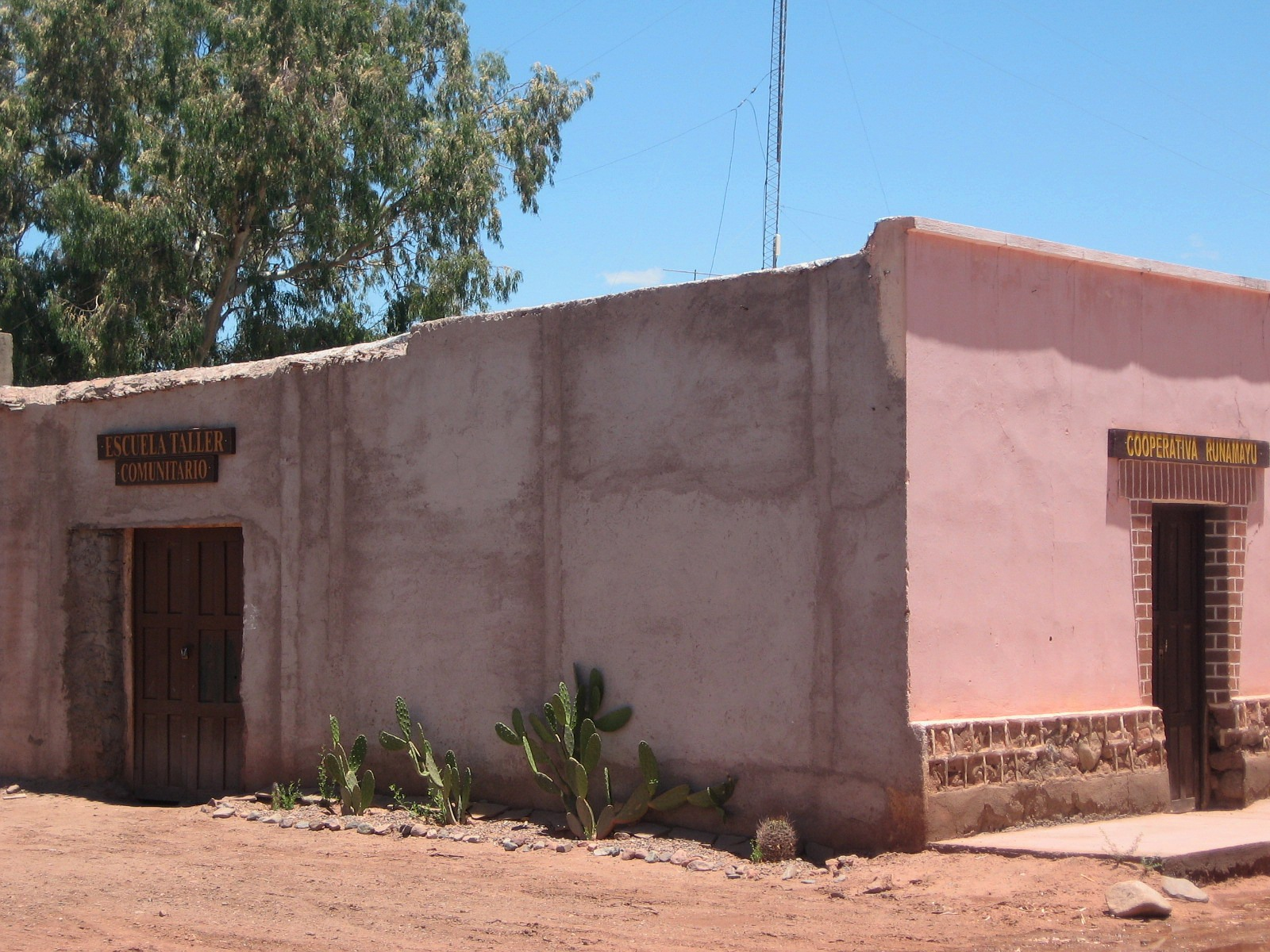
- Cooperative and Community Workshop School in the town of Banda Florida
- Interactive map of Banda Florida
- Country: Argentina
- Province: La Rioja Province
- Time zone: UTC−3 (ART)

Banda Florida is a municipality and village in La Rioja Province in northwestern Argentina.
