= Sierra de Famatina =

Mountain range in Argentina

Coat of arms of La Rioja featuring Cerro General Belgrano

The Sierra de Famatina is a mountain range and massif in the Andes (controversially considered part of Sierras Pampeanas by Argentine authorities) of the Argentine province of La Rioja. The range rises between the north-south valleys of Bermejo and Antinaco-Los Colorados. The highest point, designated Cerro General Belgrano (once known as Nevado de Famatina), rises 20,505 ft (6,250 m) and is featured in the coat of arms of La Rioja Province.

== See also ==
- Famatina Department, La Rioja
- Famatinian orogeny
- Reicheocactus famatimensis (Speg.) Schlumpb.

29°00′52″S 67°47′58″W
