= Portezuelo, La Rioja =

Coordinates: 30°51′S 66°42′W

Portezuelo
- Municipality and village
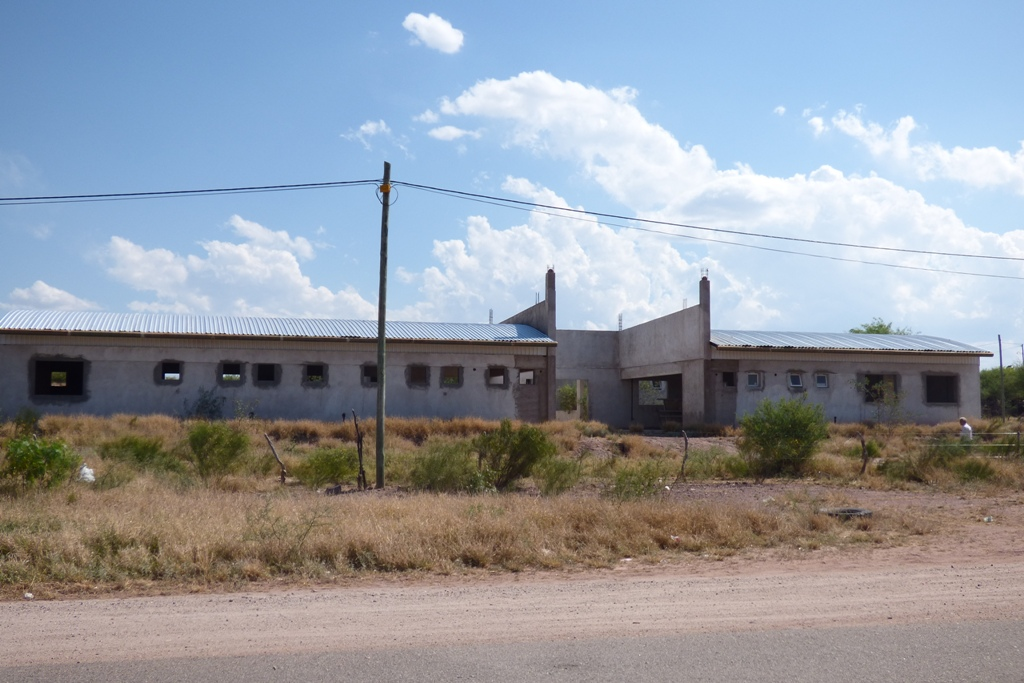
- Portezuelo hospital
- Interactive map of Portezuelo
- Country: Argentina
- Province: La Rioja Province
- Time zone: UTC−3 (ART)

Portezuelo is a municipality and village in La Rioja Province in northwestern Argentina.
