= La Rioja Province, Argentina =

Province of Argentina

La Rioja
- Province
- Province of La Rioja; Provincia de La Rioja (Spanish)
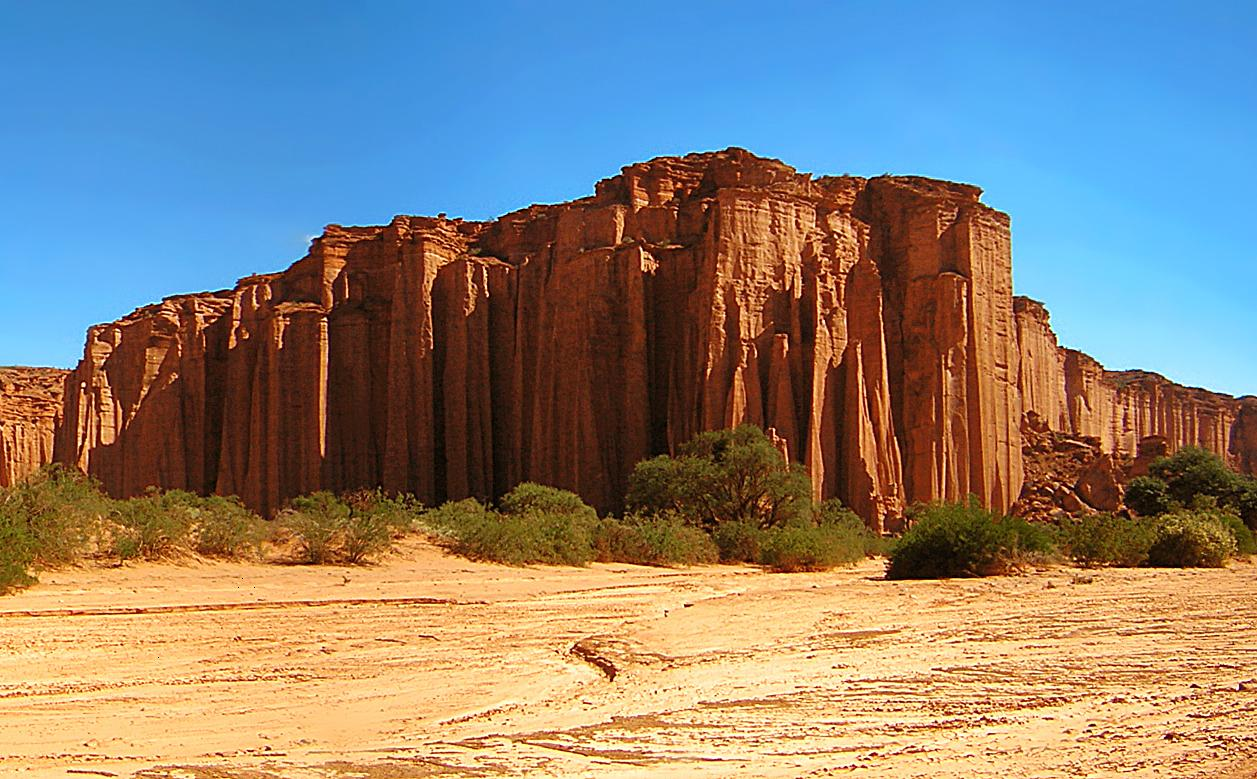
- The Talampaya National Park

- Flag Coat of arms

- Coordinates: 29°24′48″S 66°51′24″W
- Country: Argentina
- Capital: La Rioja
- Divisions: 18 departments

Government
  - Governor: Ricardo Quintela (PJ/UxP)
  - Vice Governor: Teresita Madera (PJ/UxP)
  - Legislature: 36
  - National Deputies: 5
  - National Senators: Florencia López (PJ); Fernando Rejal (PJ); Juan Carlos Pagotto (LLA)

Area
  - Total: 89,680 km^{2} (34,630 sq mi)

Population (2022 census)
  - Total: 384,607
  - Rank: 21st
  - Density: 4.289/km^{2} (11.11/sq mi)
- Demonym: Riojano

GDP
  - Total: US$ 4.8 billion
  - Per capita: US$ 12,000
- Time zone: UTC−3 (ART)
- ISO 3166 code: AR-F
- HDI (2021): 0.840 very high (16th)
- Website: larioja.gov.ar

La Rioja (Spanish pronunciation: [la ˈrjoxa]), officially Province of La Rioja is a province of Argentina located in the west of the country. The landscape of the province consists of a series of arid to semi-arid mountain ranges and agricultural valleys in between. It is in one of these valleys that the capital of the province, the city of La Rioja, lies. Neighboring provinces are, from the north clockwise, Catamarca, Córdoba, San Luis and San Juan. The Triassic sauropodomorph dinosaur Riojasaurus is named after the province.

== History ==
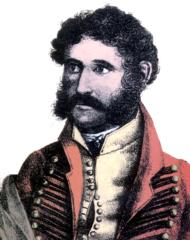
Facundo Quiroga, La Rioja's popular fighter for autonomy

Petroglyphs created by early indigenous peoples at the Talampaya National Park are dated around 10,000 years BC. Succeeding cultures of indigenous peoples developed here. The Diaguita, Capayan and the Olongasta peoples inhabited the territory of present-day La Rioja Province at the time of encounter with the Spanish colonists in the 16th century.

Juan Ramírez de Velazco founded Todos Los Santos de la Nueva Rioja in 1591 under the government of Tucumán of the Viceroyalty of Peru. In 1630 the Calchaquí people revolted against the Spanish, but the governor Albornoz suppressed them.

In 1783, after the creation of the Viceroyalty of the Río de la Plata, the control of the province of 10,000 inhabitants passed to the Córdoba independency. The province acquired independence from Córdoba in 1820. Following attempts by Bernardino Rivadavia, the first elected President of Argentina, to impose a centralist constitution, the caudillo Juan Facundo Quiroga emerged as a popular leader. He represented their preference for more autonomy, for which they continued to press following Quiroga's 1835 assassination. After a period of internal instability in Argentina, the province finally joined the Argentine Confederation in 1853.

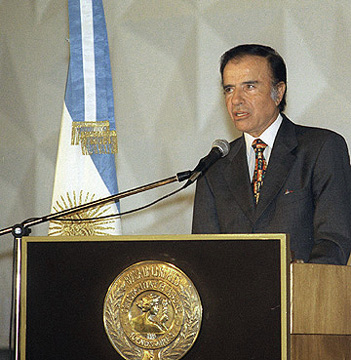
Carlos Saúl Menem was the only Argentine president of Arab descent and raised as a Muslim

La Rioja attracted fewer immigrants from Europe than other Argentine provinces did from 1890 to the 1930s.

Some Syrian and Lebanese immigrants did settle in the province, among whom the most well-known is probably the Menem family. Coming from what had been the Ottoman Empire, Saul Menem and his wife were of Armenian and Alawi ancestry. He prospered as a traveling salesman and sent his eldest son, Carlos Menem, to Spain for college. The younger Menem was elected governor of La Rioja Province in March 1973, was imprisoned during the subsequent dictatorship and was elected president of Argentina in 1989, serving until 1999. During those years, he steered billions in federal public works spending into La Rioja. Although the province remains less developed than the average in the nation, its economy today compares favorably with those of its neighbors.

== Geography ==
Köppen climate map of La Rioja, Argentina

Located in the Argentine Northwest area, its landscape is arid to semi-arid, and the dry climate receives annually 200 millimetres or 8 inches of precipitation, has short winters, and very hot summers.

From the Andes at the west, with peaks of up to 6,795 metres (22,293 ft) (Monte Pissis), the relief's height descends towards the sierras of the neighbouring dry Pampas zone. Most ranges in La Rioja are oriented north-south. The province's two largest cities, La Rioja and Chilecito are separated by Sierra de Velasco and west of Chilecito and Famatina rises the Sierra de Famatina with heights of up to 6,250 metres or 20,500 feet.

The Talampaya National Park is a dry red-soil canyon of the dry Talampaya river, which contains many cliff walls and rock formations that make it an interesting tourist destination.

== Economy ==
La Rioja's economy, estimated at US$1.822 billion in 2006, is the second-smallest among Argentina's provinces. Its per capita output of US$6,283, though about 30% below the national average, makes it the most well-developed in northern Argentina.

Its economy is, likewise, very well-diversified. Agriculture (long limited by La Rioja's dry, mountainous terrain) adds less than 5% to its output. La Rioja's agriculture (as well as cities) lies on the banks of the few permanent rivers and oases that allow irrigation, with only 190 square kilometres of cultivated land. Vineyards, nuts and olive plantations are the most common, followed by cotton.

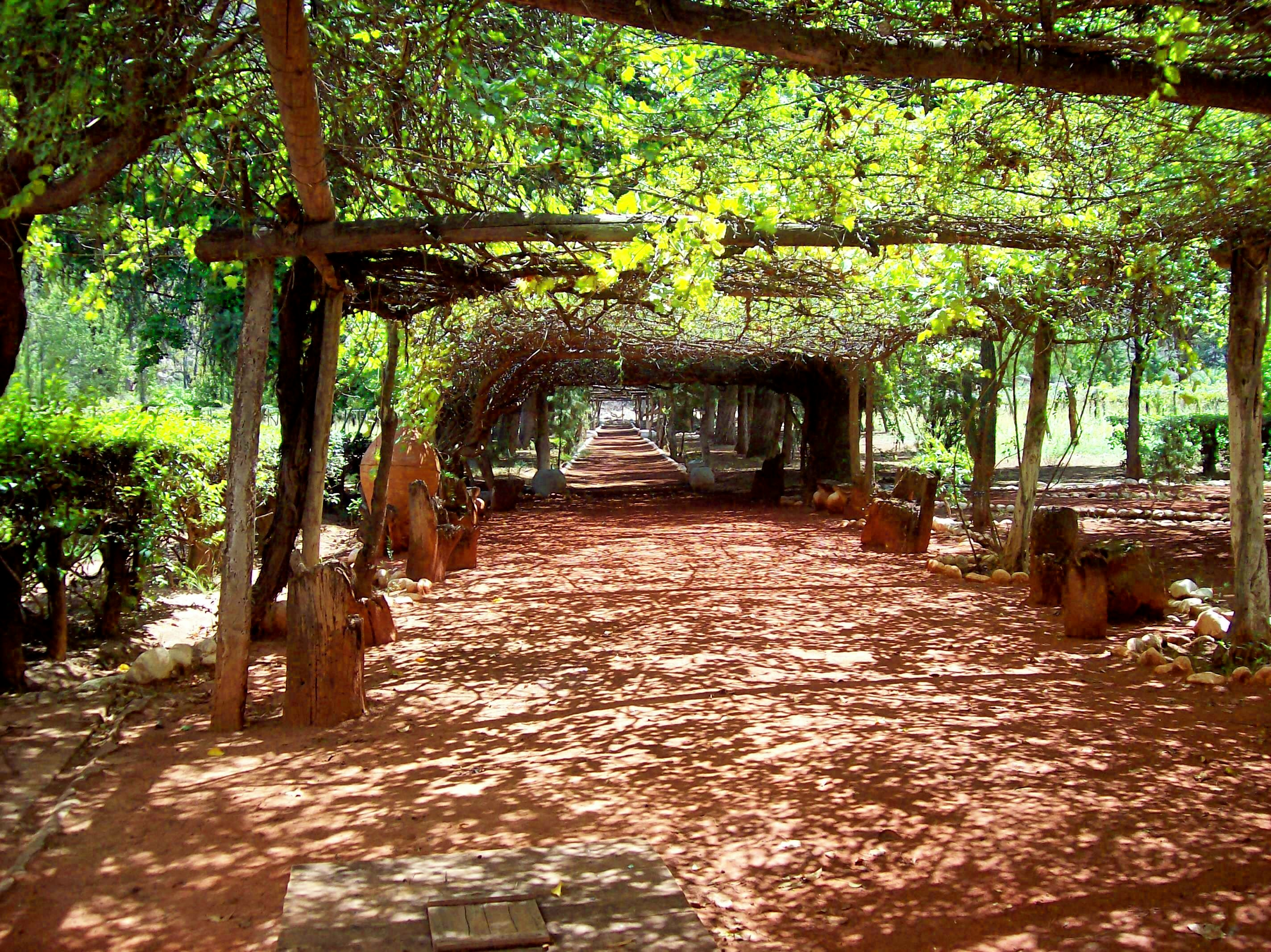
Vineyard in Chilecito.

The province's main crop is the grape, and its associated wine production, especially around the Chilecito area, with a production of 8 million litres per year.

Cattle (250,000 head) and goats (150,000 head) are secondary activities, particularly for skin and leather. Clay represents the main mining activity, and uranium is also extracted near El Colorado.

Manufacturing in La Rioja has expanded considerably since Gov. Menem began attracting investment into the province, after 1983. Limited mostly to light industry like bottling and food processing, it, nevertheless, adds about 20% to La Rioja's output. Tourism is, likewise, an expanding activity. Besides the Talampaya National Park, tourists visiting La Rioja usually go also to the Chilecito town, Cerro de La Cruz, Termas de Santa Teresita hot springs and the village of Villa Sanagasta.

Since 2024 it has its own currency, the chacho, which was introduced in response to the economic problems caused by President Javier Milei's austerity program and accompanying cuts to federal budget transfers.

== Government ==
The provincial government is divided into the usual three branches: the executive, headed by a popularly elected governor, who appoint the cabinet; the legislative; and the judiciary, headed by the Supreme Court.

The Constitution of La Rioja Province, Argentina forms the formal law of the province.

In Argentina, the most important law enforcement organization is the Argentine Federal Police but the additional work is carried out by the La Rioja Provincial Police.

== Political divisions ==
The province is divided in 18 departments (Spanish departamentos). They are formally considered to be a single municipality, and usually contain one or more population centers (i.e. towns and cities).

1. Arauco (Aimogasta)
2. Capital (La Rioja)
3. Castro Barros (Aminga)
4. Chamical (Chamical)
5. Chilecito (Chilecito)
6. Coronel Felipe Varela (Villa Unión)
7. Famatina (Famatina)
8. General Ángel Vicente Peñaloza (Tama)
9. General Belgrano (Olta)
10. General Juan Facundo Quiroga (Malazán)
11. General Lamadrid (Villa Castelli)
12. General Ocampo (Milagro)
13. General San Martín (Ulapes)
14. Independencia (Patquía)
15. Rosario Vera Peñaloza (Chepes)
16. San Blas de los Sauces (San Blas de los Sauces)
17. Sanagasta (Sanagasta)
18. Vinchina (Vinchina)
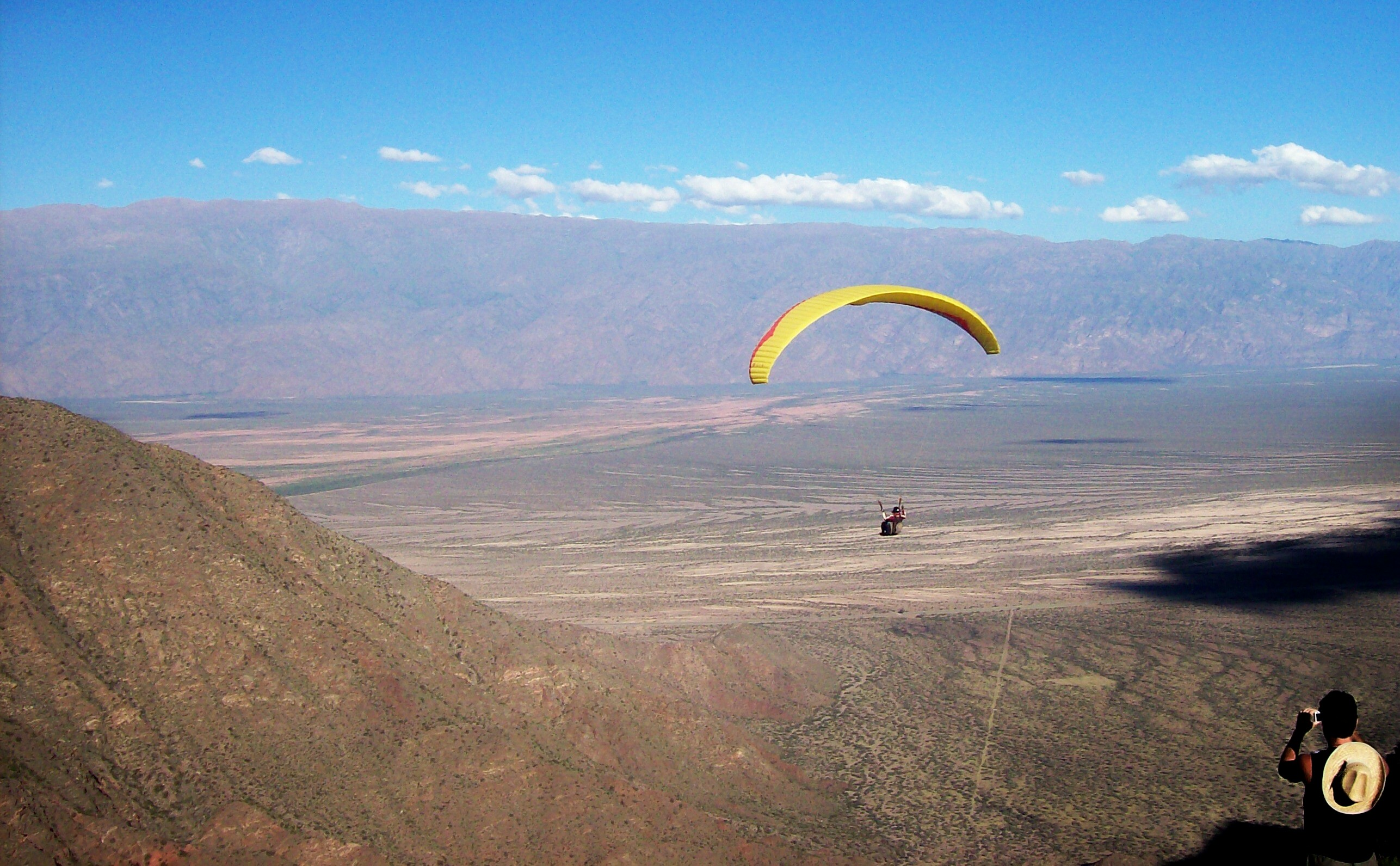
Hang gliding in the Famatina valley, La Rioja.

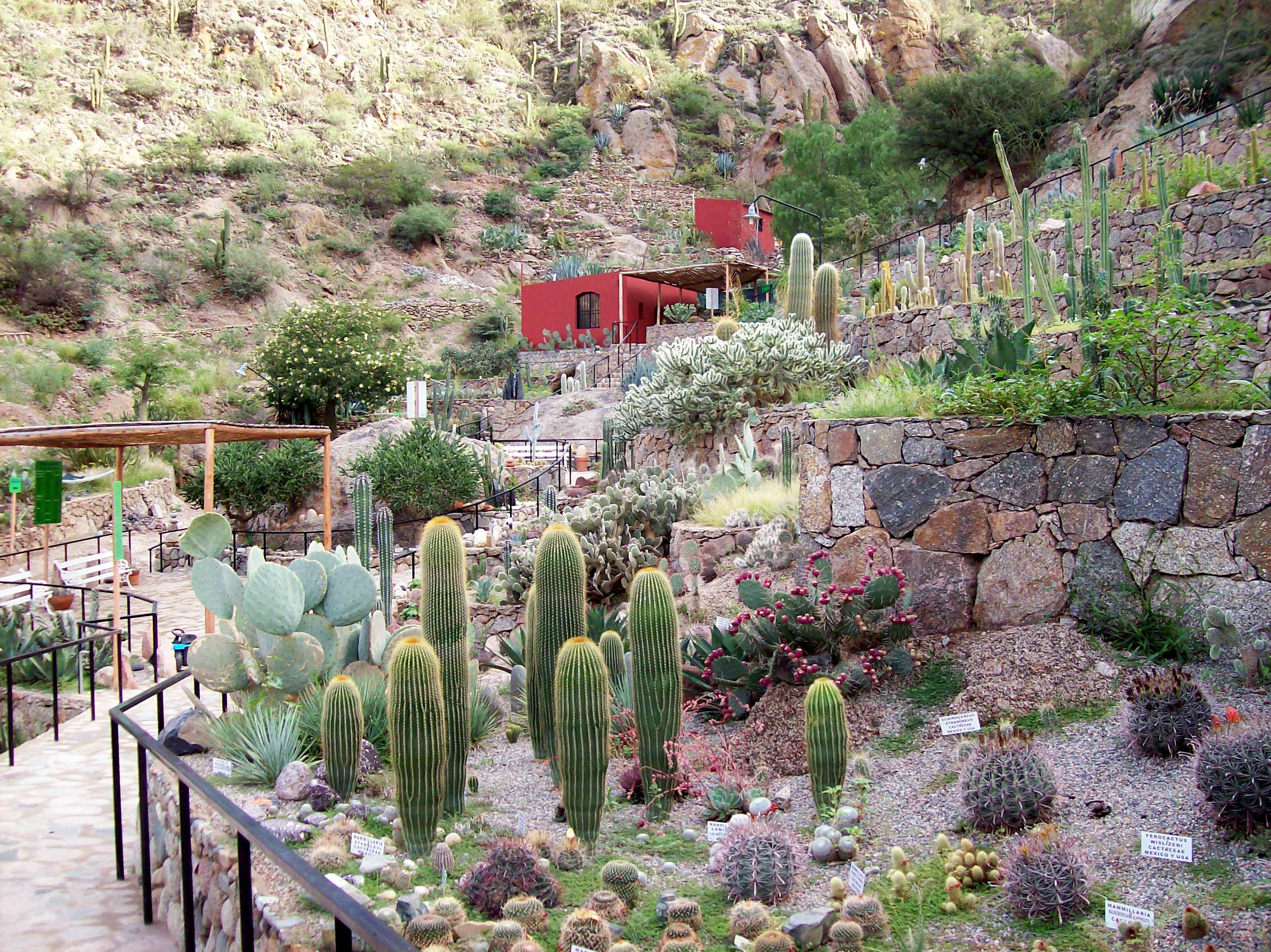
Chirau Mita Botanical Gardens, Chilecito.

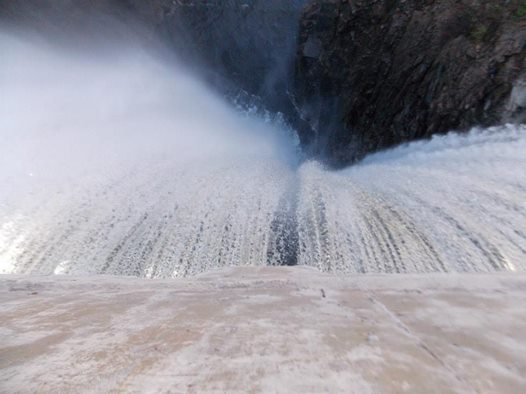
Dam wall, Olta

== See also ==
- 1894 San Juan earthquake
- Ambil
- Amuschinas
- Andolucas
- Ángulos
- Anjullón
- Banda Florida
- Castro Barros
- Chaupihuasi
- Colonia Anguinán
- Colonia Catinzaco
- Colonia Malligasta
- Colonia Ortiz de Ocampo
- Colonia Vichigasta
- Cuipán
- Desiderio Tello
- Guanchín
- Las Talas
- Los Palacios
- Los Sarmientos
- Miranda
- Portezuelo
- San Nicolás
- San Pedro
- Santa Clara
- Santa Vera Cruz
- Santo Domingo
- Tilimuqui
