= Departments of Argentina =

Administrative divisions of Argentina

Departments (Spanish: departamentos) are the second level of administrative division in Argentina, below the provinces, and are subdivided into municipalities. They exist throughout all of Argentina except for the Province of Buenos Aires and the Autonomous City of Buenos Aires, the national capital, each of which has different administrative arrangements (respectively partidos and comunas).

Except in La Rioja, Mendoza, and San Juan Provinces, departments have no executive authorities or assemblies of their own. However, they serve as territorial constituencies for the election of members of the legislative bodies of most provinces. For example, in Santa Fe Province, each department returns one senator to the provincial senate. In Tucumán Province, on the other hand, where legislators are elected by zone (Capital, East, West) the departments serve only as districts for the organization of certain civil agencies, such as the police or the health system.

There are 377 departments in all, not including the two "nominal" departments composed of internationally disputed territory in Tierra del Fuego Province: Antártida Argentina, and Islas del Atlántico Sur (which includes the Falkland Islands and South Georgia and the South Sandwich Islands). Of the department names, 31 are not unique within Argentina, with the result that 90 departments have identically or similarly named counterparts in one or more other Argentine province.

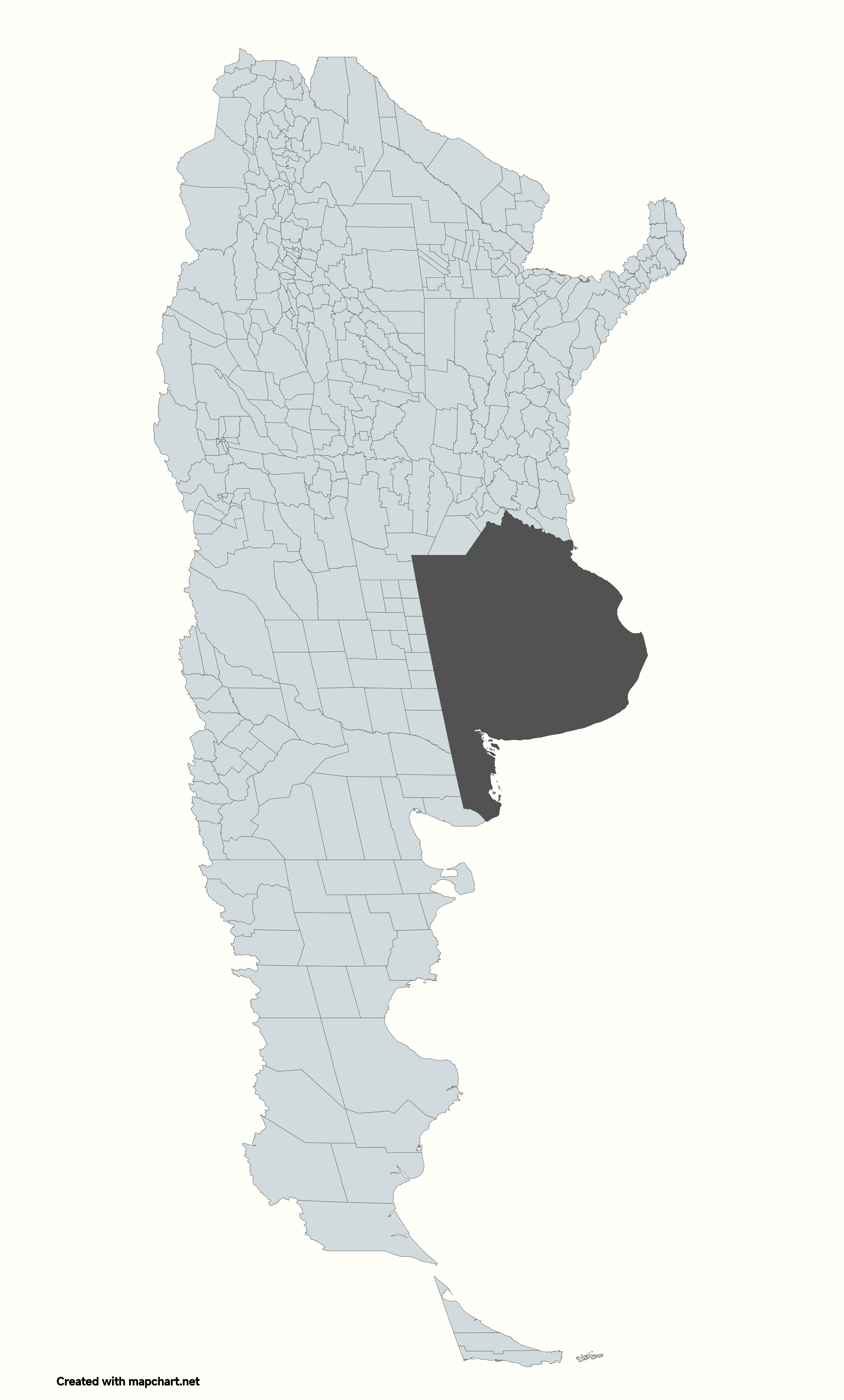
A map of the Argentine departments (except for the province of Buenos Aires and the Autonomous City of Buenos Aires colored in dark gray)

== List of departments ==
Department	Capital	Population	Province
Adolfo Alsina	Viedma	64,482	Río Negro
Aguirre	Pinto	7,610	Santiago del Estero
Albardón	General San Martín	20,413	San Juan
Alberdi	Campo Gallo	15,617	Santiago del Estero
Almirante Brown	Pampa del Infierno	28,096	Chaco
Aluminé	Aluminé	10,244	Neuquén
Ambato	La Puerta	4,525	Catamarca
Ancasti	Ancasti	3,082	Catamarca
Andalgalá	Andalgalá	14,068	Catamarca
Añelo	Añelo	18,166	Neuquén
Angaco	Villa del Salvador	7,570	San Juan
Anta	Joaquín Víctor González	49,841	Salta
Antofagasta de la Sierra	Antofagasta de la Sierra	1,282	Catamarca
Antártida Argentina	—	469	Tierra del Fuego
Apóstoles	Apóstoles	50,597	Misiones
Arauco	Aimogasta	16,257	La Rioja
Atamisqui	Villa Atamisqui	2,683	Santiago del Estero
Atreuco	Macachín	11,138	La Pampa
Avellaneda (Río Negro)	Choele Choel	41,352	Río Negro
Avellaneda (Santiago del Estero)	Herrera	20,763	Santiago del Estero
Ayacucho	San Francisco del Monte de Oro	16,906	San Luis
Banda	La Banda	142,279	Santiago del Estero
Bariloche	San Carlos de Bariloche	162,088	Río Negro
Belgrano (San Luis)	Villa General Roca	3,881	San Luis
Belgrano (Santa Fe)	Las Rosas	41,449	Santa Fe
Belgrano (Santiago del Estero)	Bandera	9,243	Santiago del Estero
Belén	Belén	12,252	Catamarca
Bella Vista	Bella Vista (Corrientes)	35,350	Corrientes
Bermejo (Chaco)	La Leonesa	24,215	Chaco
Bermejo (Formosa)	Laguna Yema	15,644	Formosa
Berón de Astrada	Berón de Astrada	2,294	Corrientes
Biedma	Puerto Madryn	58,667	Chubut
Burruyacú	Burruyacú	32,936	Tucumán
Cachi	Cachi	7,280	Salta
Cafayete	Cafayate	11,785	Salta
Cainguás	Campo Grande	59,953	Misiones
Calamuchita	San Agustín	50,000	Córdoba
Caleu Caleu	La Adela	2,611	La Pampa
Calingasta	Tamberías	8,176	San Juan
Candelaria	Santa Ana	35,318	Misiones
Capayán	Chumbicha	6,358	Catamarca
Capital (Catamarca)	San Fernando del Valle de Catamarca	159,703	Catamarca
Capital (Córdoba)	Córdoba	1,284,582	Córdoba
Capital (Corrientes)	Corrientes	328,868	Corrientes
Capital (La Pampa)	Santa Rosa (La Pampa)	119,632	La Pampa
Capital (La Rioja)	La Rioja	211,651	La Rioja
Capital (Mendoza)	Mendoza	127,160	Mendoza
Capital (Misiones)	Posadas	392,919	Misiones
Capital (Salta)	Salta	535,303	Salta
Capital (San Juan)	San Juan	116,511	San Juan
Capital (Santiago del Estero)	Santiago del Estero	267,125	Santiago del Estero
Capital (Tucumán)	San Miguel de Tucumán	567,607	Tucumán
Caseros	Casilda	79,096	Santa Fe
Castellanos	Rafaela	162,165	Santa Fe
Castro Barros	Aminga	5,810	La Rioja
Catán Lil	Las Coloradas	2,676	Neuquén
Catriló	Catriló	8,235	La Pampa
Caucete	Caucete	33,609	San Juan
Cerrillos	Cerrillos	35,579	Salta
Chacabuco (Chaco)	Charata	27,813	Chaco
Chacabuco (San Luis)	Concarán	18,410	San Luis
Chalileo	Santa Isabel	2,885	La Pampa
Chamical	Chamical	15,666	La Rioja
Chapaleufú	Intendente Alvear	12,334	La Pampa
Chical Có	Algarrobo del Aguila	1,466	La Pampa
Chicligasta	Concepción	75,133	Tucumán
Chicoana	Chicoana	18,248	Salta
Chilecito	Chilecito	58,798	La Rioja
Chimbas	Villa Paula Albarracín de Sarmiento	73,829	San Juan
Chos Malal	Chos Malal	18,368	Neuquén
Choya	Frías	34,667	Santiago del Estero
Cochinoca	Abra Pampa	15,054	Jujuy
Collón Curá	Piedra del Águila	4,835	Neuquén
Colón (Córdoba)	Jesús María	171,067	Córdoba
Colón (Entre Ríos)	Colón	75,305	Entre Ríos
Comandante Fernández	Presidencia Roque Sáenz Peña	88,164	Chaco
Concepción (Corrientes)	Concepción	21,113	Corrientes
Concepción (Misiones)	Concepción de la Sierra	10,348	Misiones
Concordia	Concordia	198,802	Entre Ríos
Conesa	General Conesa	7,429	Río Negro
Confluencia	Neuquén	468,794	Neuquén
Conhelo	Eduardo Castex	15,186	La Pampa
Constitución	Villa Constitución	83,045	Santa Fe
Copo	Monte Quemado	35,741	Santiago del Estero
Coronel Felipe Varela	Villa Unión (La Rioja)	11,372	La Rioja
Coronel Pringles	La Toma	12,571	San Luis
Corpen Aike	Puerto Santa Cruz	15,171	Santa Cruz
Cruz Alta	Banda del Río Salí	162,240	Tucumán
Cruz del Eje	Cruz del Eje	52,172	Córdoba
Curacó	Puelches	1,116	La Pampa
Curuzú Cuatía	Curuzú Cuatía	42,075	Corrientes
Cushamen	Leleque	17,134	Chubut
Deseado	Puerto Deseado	126,743	Santa Cruz
Diamante	Diamante	53,595	Entre Ríos
Doce de Octubre	General Pinedo	20,149	Chaco
Doctor Manuel Belgrano	San Salvador de Jujuy	320,990	Jujuy
Dos de Abril	Hermoso Campo	7,435	Chaco
El Alto	El Alto	3,400	Catamarca
El Carmen	El Carmen	122,366	Jujuy
El Cuy	El Cuy	6,960	Río Negro
Eldorado	Eldorado	91,728	Misiones
Empedrado	Empedrado	14,721	Corrientes
Escalante	Comodoro Rivadavia	163,609	Chubut
Esquina	Esquina	30,372	Corrientes
Famaillá	Famaillá	42,702	Tucumán
Famatina	Famatina	7,002	La Rioja
Federación	Federación	78,691	Entre Ríos
Federal	Federal	29,667	Entre Ríos
Figueroa	La Cañada	1,524	Santiago del Estero
Florentino Ameghino	Camarones	1,484	Chubut
Formosa	Formosa	269,589	Formosa
Fray Justo Santa María de Oro	Santa Sylvina	10,485	Chaco
Fray Mamerto Esquiú	San José de Fray Mamerto Esquiú	10,658	Catamarca
Futaleufú	Esquel	37,540	Chubut
Gaiman	Gaiman	9,612	Chubut
Garay	Helvecia	19,913	Santa Fe
Gastre	Gastre	1,508	Chubut
General Alvear (Corrientes)	Alvear	8,147	Corrientes
General Alvear (Mendoza)	General Alvear	52,584	Mendoza
General Ángel Vicente Peñaloza	Tama	3,185	La Rioja
General Belgrano (Chaco)	Corzuela	10,470	Chaco
General Belgrano (La Rioja)	Olta	7,618	La Rioja
General Donovan	Makallé	13,385	Chaco
General Güemes (Chaco)	Juan José Castelli	62,227	Chaco
General Güemes (Salta)	General Güemes	42,255	Salta
General Juan Facundo Quiroga	Malanzán	4,017	La Rioja
General Lamadrid	Villa Castelli	1,886	La Rioja
General López	Melincué	182,113	Santa Fe
General Manuel Belgrano	Bernardo de Irigoyen	45,570	Misiones
General Obligado	Reconquista	197,986	Santa Fe
General Ocampo	Milagro	7,349	La Rioja
General Paz	Caá Catí	14,725	Corrientes
General Pedernera	Villa Mercedes	110,814	San Luis
General Roca (Córdoba)	Villa Huidobro	33,323	Córdoba
General Roca (Río Negro)	General Roca	380,525	Río Negro
General San Martín (Córdoba)	Villa María	116,107	Córdoba
General San Martín (La Rioja)	Ulapes	5,019	La Rioja
General San Martín (Salta)	Tartagal	156,910	Salta
General Taboada	Añatuya	38,015	Santiago del Estero
Gobernador Dupuy	Buena Esperanza	14,343	San Luis
Godoy Cruz	Godoy Cruz	195,159	Mendoza
Goya	Goya	87,349	Corrientes
Graneros	Graneros	5,263	Tucumán
Guachipas	Guachipas	3,193	Salta
Gualeguay	Gualeguay	57,303	Entre Ríos
Gualeguaychú	Gualeguaychú	126,147	Entre Ríos
Guarani	El Soberbio	77,160	Misiones
Guasayán	San Pedro de Guasayán	7,404	Santiago del Estero
Guatraché	Guatraché	9,517	La Pampa
Guaymallén	Villa Nueva	321,966	Mendoza
Güer Aike	Río Gallegos	137,895	Santa Cruz
Huiliches	Junín de los Andes	20,973	Neuquén
Humahuaca	Humahuaca	20,914	Jujuy
Huncal	Bernasconi	7,787	La Pampa
Iglesia	Rodeo	6,737	San Juan
Iguazú	Puerto Esperanza	100,096	Misiones
Independencia (Chaco)	Campo Largo	20,620	Chaco
Independencia (La Rioja)	Patquía	2,401	La Rioja
Iriondo	Cañada de Gómez	65,486	Santa Fe
Iruya	Iruya	6,370	Salta
Ischilín	Deán Funes	30,105	Córdoba
Islas del Atlántico Sur	—	—	Tierra del Fuego
Itatí	Itatí	8,774	Corrientes
Ituzaingó	Ituzaingó	30,565	Corrientes
Jáchal	San José de Jáchal	21,018	San Juan
Jiménez	Pozo Hondo	14,352	Santiago del Estero
Juan Bautista Alberdi	Juan Bautista Alberdi	34,766	Tucumán
Juan Felipe Ibarra	Suncho Corral	18,051	Santiago del Estero
Junín (Mendoza)	Junín	46,604	Mendoza
Junín (San Luis)	Santa Rosa de Conlara	20,271	San Luis
Juárez Celman	La Carlota	55,438	Córdoba
La Caldera	La Caldera	5,711	Salta
La Candelaria	La Candelaria	5,704	Salta
La Capital (San Luis)	San Luis	168,771	San Luis
La Capital (Santa Fe)	Santa Fe	489,505	Santa Fe
Lacar	San Martín de los Andes	39,596	Neuquén
La Cocha	La Cocha	21,218	Tucumán
Lago Argentino	El Calafate	25,586	Santa Cruz
Lago Buenos Aires	Perito Moreno	12,606	Santa Cruz
Laishi	San Francisco de Laishi	19,303	Formosa
Languiñeo	Tecka	3,017	Chubut
La Paz	Recreo	21,061	Catamarca
La Paz (Entre Ríos)	La Paz (Entre Ríos)	75,407	Entre Ríos
La Paz (Mendoza)	La Paz (Mendoza)	12,086	Mendoza
La Poma	La Poma	1,735	Salta
Las Colonias	Esperanza	95,202	Santa Fe
Las Heras	Las Heras	234,401	Mendoza
Lavalle (Corrientes)	Lavalle	26,250	Corrientes
Lavalle (Mendoza)	Villa Tulumaya	47,167	Mendoza
La Viña	La Viña	7,152	Salta
Leales	Bella Vista (Tucumán)	66,392	Tucumán
Leandro N. Alem	Leandro N. Alem	47,797	Misiones
Ledesma	Libertador General San Martín	94,252	Jujuy
Libertad	Puerto Tirol	10,822	Chaco
Libertador General San Martín (Chaco)	General José de San Martín	54,470	Chaco
Libertador General San Martín (Misiones)	Puerto Rico	52,428	Misiones
Libertador General San Martín (San Luis)	San Martín (San Luis)	5,189	San Luis
Lihuel Calel	Cuchillo-Có	443	La Pampa
Limay Mahuida	Limay Mahuida	423	La Pampa
Loncopué	Loncopué	7,698	Neuquén
Loreto	Loreto	20,036	Santiago del Estero
Los Andes	San Antonio de los Cobres	5,630	Salta
Los Lagos	Villa La Angostura	15,555	Neuquén
Loventué	Victorica	9,322	La Pampa
Luján de Cuyo	Luján de Cuyo	175,056	Mendoza
Lules	Lules	57,235	Tucumán
Magallanes	Puerto San Julián	12,911	Santa Cruz
Maipú	Tres Isletas	24,747	Chaco
Maipú	Maipú	219,402	Mendoza
Malargüe	Malargüe	32,717	Mendoza
Maracó	General Pico	69,514	La Pampa
Marcos Juárez	Marcos Juárez	99,761	Córdoba
Mártires	Las Plumas	977	Chubut
Matacos	Ingeniero Juárez	17,032	Formosa
Mayor Luis Jorge Fontana	Villa Ángela	53,550	Chaco
Mburucuyá	Mburucuyá	9,012	Corrientes
Mercedes	Mercedes	39,206	Corrientes
Metán	San José de Metán	39,006	Salta
Minas (Córdoba)	San Carlos (Córdoba)	4,881	Córdoba
Minas (Neuquén)	Andacollo	9,267	Neuquén
Mitre	Villa Unión (Santiago del Estero)	1,890	Santiago del Estero
Molinos	Molinos	5,652	Salta
Montecarlo	Montecarlo	38,669	Misiones
Monte Caseros	Monte Caseros	33,684	Corrientes
Monteros	Monteros	77,551	Tucumán
Moreno	Quimilí	28,053	Santiago del Estero
Nogoyá	Nogoyá	43,195	Entre Ríos
Ñorquín	El Huecú	5,609	Neuquén
Ñorquincó	Ñorquincó	1,452	Río Negro
Nueve de Julio (Chaco)	Las Breñas	26,955	Chaco
Nueve de Julio (Río Negro)	Sierra Colorada	3,719	Río Negro
Nueve de Julio (San Juan)	Nueve de Julio, San Juan	9,307	San Juan
Nueve de Julio (Santa Fe)	Tostado, Santa Fe	28,273	Santa Fe
Oberá	Oberá	121,701	Misiones
O'Higgins	San Bernardo	19,231	Chaco
Ojo de Agua	Villa Ojo de Agua	20,000	Santiago del Estero
Orán	San Ramón de la Nueva Orán	11,892	Salta
Paclín	La Merced	4,290	Catamarca
Palpalá	Palpalá	65,541	Jujuy
Paraná	Paraná	391,696	Entre Ríos
Paso de Indios	Paso de Indios	1,905	Chubut
Paso de los Libres	Paso de los Libres	46,329	Corrientes
Patiño	Comandante Fontana	81,819	Formosa
Pehuenches	Buta Ranquil	29,753	Neuquén
Pellegrini	Nueva Esperanza	4,278	Santiago del Estero
Pichi Mahuida	Río Colorado	16,551	Río Negro
Picunches	Las Lajas	8,495	Neuquén
Picún Leufú	Picún Leufú	5,087	Neuquén
Pilagás	El Espinillo	19,116	Formosa
Pilcaniyeu	Pilcaniyeu	9,373	Río Negro
Pilcomayo	Clorinda	94,383	Formosa
Pirané	Pirané	72,804	Formosa
Pocho	Salsacate	5,132	Córdoba
Pocito	Villa Alberastain	72,915	San Juan
Pomán	Saujil	9,543	Catamarca
Presidencia de la Plaza	Presidencia de la Plaza	12,231	Chaco
Presidente Roque Sáenz Peña	Laboulaye	34,647	Córdoba
Primero de Mayo	Margarita Belén	9,131	Chaco
Puelén	Veinticinco de Mayo	11,654	La Pampa
Punilla	Cosquín	155,124	Córdoba
Quebrachos	Sumampa	10,540	Santiago del Estero
Quemú Quemú	Quemú Quemú	8,460	La Pampa
Quitilipi	Quitilipi	32,083	Chaco
Ramón Lista	El Chorro	17,729	Formosa
Rancul	Parera	11,133	La Pampa
Rawson (Chubut)	Rawson	115,829	Chubut
Rawson (San Juan)	Villa Krause	136,617	San Juan
Realicó Department	Realicó	17,470	La Pampa
Rinconada Department	Rinconada	1,802	Jujuy
Rivadavia (Mendoza)	Rivadavia (Mendoza)	63,724	Mendoza
Rivadavia (Salta)	Rivadavia (Salta)	38,113	Salta
Rivadavia (San Juan)	Rivadavia (San Juan)	76,150	San Juan
Rivadavia (Santiago del Estero)	Selva	5,015	Santiago del Estero
Robles	Fernández	44,415	Santiago del Estero
Rosario	Rosario	1,342,301	Santa Fe
Rosario de la Frontera	Rosario de la Frontera	22,218	Salta
Rosario de Lerma	Rosario de Lerma	33,741	Salta
Rosario Vera Peñaloza	Chepes	15,783	La Rioja
Río Chico (Santa Cruz)	Gobernador Gregores	6,314	Santa Cruz
Río Chico (Tucumán)	Aguilares	64,962	Tucumán
Río Cuarto	Río Cuarto	292,293	Córdoba
Río Grande	Río Grande	70,042	Tierra del Fuego
Río Hondo	Termas de Río Hondo	54,867	Santiago del Estero
Río Primero	Santa Rosa de Río Primero	42,429	Córdoba
Río Seco	Villa de María	12,635	Córdoba
Río Segundo	Villa del Rosario	95,803	Córdoba
Río Senguer	Alto Río Senguer	6,194	Chubut
Saladas	Saladas	21,470	Corrientes
Salavina	Los Telares	11,217	Santiago del Estero
Sanagasta	Villa Sanagasta	3,038	La Rioja
San Alberto	Villa Cura Brochero	32,395	Córdoba
San Antonio (Jujuy)	San Antonio (Jujuy)	6,729	Jujuy
San Antonio (Río Negro)	San Antonio Oeste	35,800	Río Negro
San Blas de los Sauces	San Blas de los Sauces	4,314	La Rioja
San Carlos (Mendoza)	San Carlos (Mendoza)	39,869	Mendoza
San Carlos (Salta)	San Carlos (Salta)	7,208	Salta
San Cosme	San Cosme	13,189	Corrientes
San Cristóbal	San Cristóbal	64,935	Santa Fe
San Fernando	Resistencia	365,637	Chaco
San Ignacio	San Ignacio	63,394	Misiones
San Javier (Córdoba)	Villa Dolores	48,951	Córdoba
San Javier (Misiones)	San Javier (Misiones)	23,503	Misiones
San Javier (Santa Fe)	San Javier (Santa Fe)	29,912	Santa Fe
San Jerónimo	Coronda	77,253	Santa Fe
San José de Feliciano	San José de Feliciano	16,803	Entre Ríos
San Justo (Córdoba)	San Francisco	190,182	Córdoba
San Justo (Santa Fe)	San Justo	40,379	Santa Fe
San Lorenzo (Chaco)	Villa Berthet	14,252	Chaco
San Lorenzo (Santa Fe)	San Lorenzo	142,097	Santa Fe
San Luis del Palmar	San Luis del Palmar	16,513	Corrientes
San Martín (Corrientes)	La Cruz	12,236	Corrientes
San Martín (Mendoza)	San Martín (Mendoza)	139,792	Mendoza
San Martín (San Juan)	Villa San Martín	10,140	San Juan
San Martín (Santa Fe)	Sastre	60,698	Santa Fe
San Martín (Santiago del Estero)	Brea Pozo	9,854	Santiago del Estero
San Miguel Department	San Miguel	10,252	Corrientes
San Pedro (Jujuy)	San Pedro (Jujuy)	88,241	Jujuy
San Pedro (Misiones)	San Pedro (Misiones)	34,801	Misiones
San Rafael	San Rafael, Mendoza	215,020	Mendoza
San Roque	San Roque	17,951	Corrientes
Santa Bárbara	Palma Sola	20,499	Jujuy
Santa Catalina	Santa Catalina	2,646	Jujuy
Santa Lucía	Santa Lucía	43,565	San Juan
Santa María (Catamarca)	Santa María	22,127	Catamarca
Santa María (Córdoba)	Alta Gracia	86,083	Córdoba
Santa Rosa (Catamarca)	Bañado de Ovanta	10,349	Catamarca
Santa Rosa (Mendoza)	Santa Rosa (Mendoza)	19,382	Mendoza
Santa Victoria	Santa Victoria Oeste	9,413	Salta
Santo Tomé	Santo Tomé	54,050	Corrientes
Sargento Cabral	Colonia Elisa	15,030	Chaco
Sarmiento (Chubut)	Sarmiento	8,724	Chubut
Sarmiento (San Juan)	Media Agua	19,092	San Juan
Sarmiento (Santiago del Estero)	Garza	4,607	Santiago del Estero
Sauce	Sauce	9,151	Corrientes
Silípica	Arraga	7,712	Santiago del Estero
Simoca	Simoca	36,973	Tucumán
Sobremonte	San Francisco del Chañar	4,531	Córdoba
Susques	Susques	4,098	Jujuy
Tafí del Valle	Tafí del Valle	13,883	Tucumán
Tafí Viejo	Tafí Viejo	172,986	Tucumán
Tala	Rosario del Tala	31,309	Entre Ríos
Tapenaga	Charadai	4,188	Chaco
Tehuelches	José de San Martín	5,498	Chubut
Telsen	Telsen	1,788	Chubut
Tercero Arriba	Oliva	107,460	Córdoba
Tilcara	Tilcara	14,721	Jujuy
Tinogasta	Tinogasta	22,570	Catamarca
Toay	Toay	18,029	La Pampa
Tolhuin	Tolhuin	6,039	Tierra del Fuego
Totoral	Villa del Totoral	16,479	Córdoba
Trancas	Trancas	17,541	Tucumán
Trenel	Trenel	5,702	La Pampa
Tulumba	Villa Tulumba	12,211	Córdoba
Tumbaya	Tumbaya	5,381	Jujuy
Tunuyán	Tunuyán	60,171	Mendoza
Tupungato	Tupungato	41,280	Mendoza
Ullum	Villa Ibáñez	4,498	San Juan
Unión	Bell Ville	100,247	Córdoba
Uruguay	Concepción del Uruguay	116,356	Entre Ríos
Ushuaia	Ushuaia	56,956	Tierra del Fuego
Utracán	General Acha	17,802	La Pampa
Valcheta	Valcheta	4,319	Río Negro
Valle Fértil	Villa San Agustín	6,864	San Juan
Valle Grande	Valle Grande	2,509	Jujuy
Valle Viejo	San Isidro	23,707	Catamarca
Veinticinco de Mayo (Chaco)	Machagai	28,070	Chaco
Veinticinco de Mayo (Misiones)	Alba Posse	30,891	Misiones
Veinticinco de Mayo (Río Negro)	Maquinchao	16,718	Río Negro
Veinticinco de Mayo (San Juan)	Villa Santa Rosa	15,193	San Juan
Vera	Vera	51,303	Santa Fe
Victoria	Victoria	40,652	Entre Ríos
Villaguay	Villaguay	55,796	Entre Ríos
Vinchina	Villa San José de Vinchina	2,699	La Rioja
Yavi	La Quiaca	25,868	Jujuy
Yerba Buena	Yerba Buena, Tucumán	63,707	Tucumán
Zapala	Zapala	45,698	Neuquén
Zonda	Villa Basilio Nievas	4,863	San Juan

== Departments with the same or similar names ==
Some departments have similar names

Referring to Manuel Belgrano in some form 7x

- Belgrano Department: 3x
- Doctor Manuel Belgrano Department, Jujuy
- General Belgrano Department: 2x
- General Manuel Belgrano Department, Misiones

Referring to José de San Martín 10x

- General San Martín Department: 2x
- Libertador General San Martín Department: 3x
- San Martín Department: 5x

Departments in different provinces having the same name

1. Avellaneda Department
  1. Avellaneda Department, Río Negro
  2. Avellaneda Department, Santiago del Estero
2. Belgrano Department
  1. Belgrano Department, San Luis
  2. Belgrano Department, Santa Fe
  3. Belgrano Department, Santiago del Estero
3. Bermejo Department
  1. Bermejo Department, Chaco
  2. Bermejo Department, Formosa
4. Capital 11x
5. Chacabuco Department
  1. Chacabuco Department, Chaco
  2. Chacabuco Department, San Luis
6. Colón Department
  1. Colón Department, Entre Ríos
  2. Colón Department, Córdoba
7. General Alvear Department
  1. General Alvear Department, Corrientes
  2. General Alvear Department, Mendoza
8. General Belgrano Department
  1. General Belgrano Department, Chaco
  2. General Belgrano Department, La Rioja
9. General Güemes Department
  1. General Güemes Department, Chaco
  2. General Güemes Department, Salta
10. General Roca Department
  1. General Roca Department, Córdoba
  2. General Roca Department, Río Negro
11. General San Martín Department
  1. General San Martín Department, Córdoba
  2. General San Martín Department, Salta
  3. General San Martín Department, La Rioja
12. Independencia Department
  1. Independencia Department, Chaco
  2. Independencia Department, La Rioja
13. Junín Department
  1. Junín Department, Mendoza
  2. Junín Department, San Luis
14. La Paz Department
  1. La Paz Department, Catamarca
  2. La Paz Department, Entre Ríos
  3. La Paz Department, Mendoza
15. Lavalle Department
  1. Lavalle Department, Corrientes
  2. Lavalle Department, Mendoza
16. Libertador General San Martín Department
  1. Libertador General San Martín Department, Misiones
  2. Libertador General San Martín Department, Chaco
  3. Libertador General San Martín Department, San Luis
17. Maipú Department
  1. Maipú Department, Chaco
  2. Maipú Department, Mendoza
18. Minas Department
  1. Minas Department, Córdoba
  2. Minas Department, Neuquén
19. Nueve de Julio Department
  1. Nueve de Julio Department, Chaco
  2. Nueve de Julio Department, Río Negro
  3. Nueve de Julio Department, San Juan
  4. Nueve de Julio Department, Santa Fe
20. Rawson Department
  1. Rawson Department, Chubut
  2. Rawson Department, San Juan
21. Río Chico Department
  1. Río Chico Department, Tucumán
  2. Río Chico Department, Santa Cruz
22. Rivadavia Department
  1. Rivadavia Department, Mendoza
  2. Rivadavia Department, Salta
  3. Rivadavia Department, San Juan
  4. Rivadavia Department, Santiago del Estero
23. San Antonio Department
  1. San Antonio Department, Jujuy
  2. San Antonio Department, Río Negro
24. San Carlos Department
  1. San Carlos Department, Mendoza
  2. San Carlos Department, Salta
25. San Javier Department
  1. San Javier Department, Córdoba
  2. San Javier Department, Misiones
  3. San Javier Department, Santa Fe
26. San Justo Department
  1. San Justo Department, Córdoba
  2. San Justo Department, Santa Fe
27. San Martín Department
  1. San Martín Department, Corrientes
  2. San Martín Department, Mendoza
  3. San Martín Department, San Juan
  4. San Martín Department, Santiago del Estero
  5. San Martín Department, Santa Fe
28. San Pedro Department
  1. San Pedro Department, Jujuy
  2. San Pedro Department, Misiones
29. Santa Rosa Department
  1. Santa Rosa Department, Catamarca
  2. Santa Rosa Department, Mendoza
30. Sarmiento Department
  1. Sarmiento Department, Chubut
  2. Sarmiento Department, San Juan
  3. Sarmiento Department, Santiago del Estero
31. Veinticinco de Mayo Department
  1. Veinticinco de Mayo Department, Chaco
  2. Veinticinco de Mayo Department, Misiones
  3. Veinticinco de Mayo Department, Río Negro
  4. Veinticinco de Mayo Department, San Juan

== See also ==
- For a list of partidos in the province of Buenos Aires, see Partidos of Buenos Aires
- For a list of comunas in the city of Buenos Aires, see Communes of Buenos Aires
