= National Route 81 (Argentina) =

Highway in Argentina

National Route 81
- Ruta nacional 81
- National Route 81

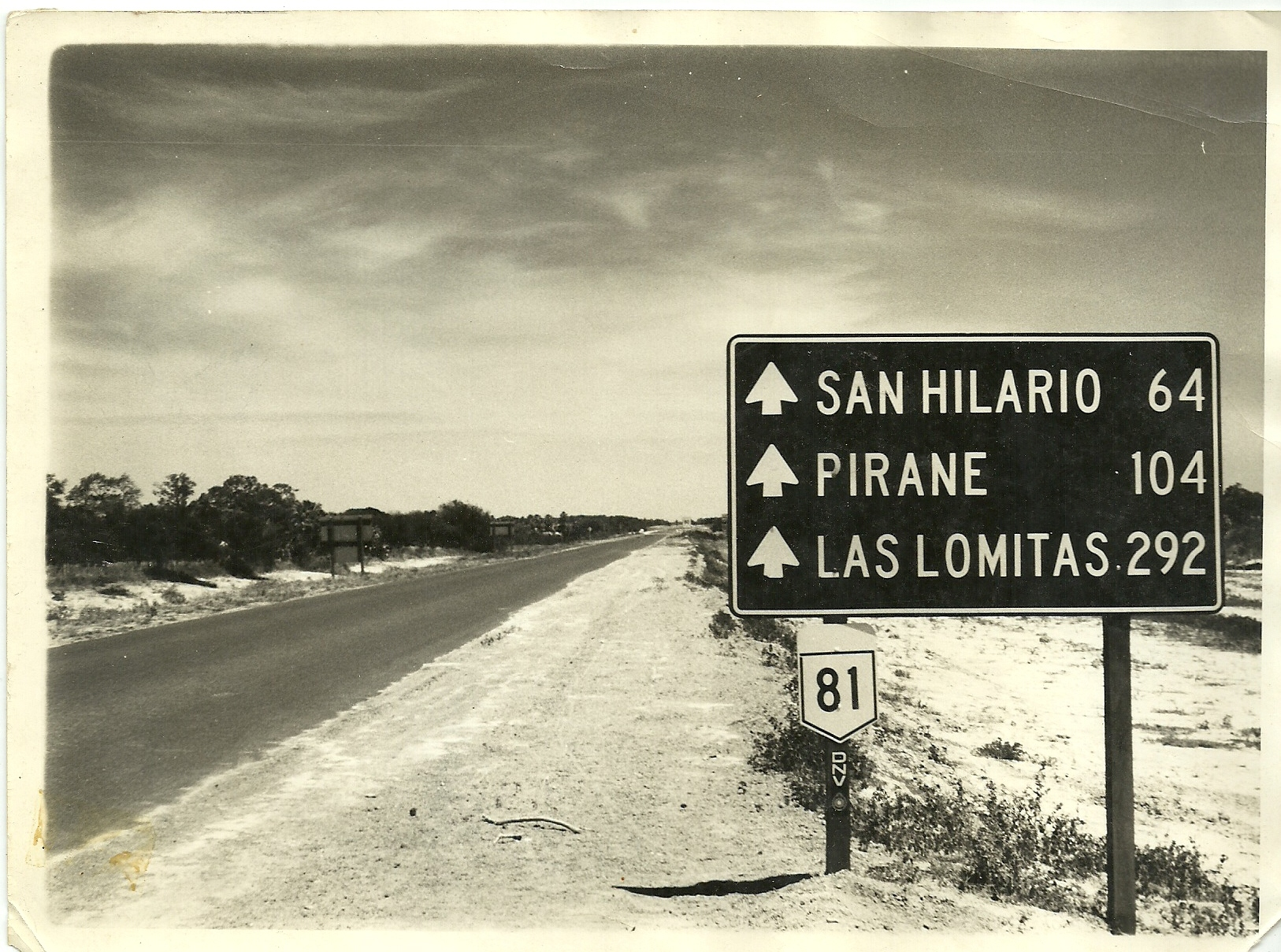
- RN 81 in the Province of Formosa.

Route information
- Length: 680 km (420 mi)

Major junctions
- Southeast end: Near Formosa
- Northwest end: Near General Ballivián

Location
- Country: Argentina

Highway system
- Highways in Argentina

National Route 81 (RN81) is a road in Argentina, which runs through the province of Formosa and ends in the eastern province of Salta, joining National Route 11 in the vicinity the city of Formosa with National Route 34 in the area of El Cruce, between the towns of Embarcación and General Ballivián. Since 2008 the entire route is paved. Its total extension is 680 km (420 mi). It was completely paved and finished on 13 March 2008, being inaugurated by President Cristina Fernández de Kirchner.

This road is part of the Capricorn Axis, defined by IIRSA as one of the three integration axes in Argentina.

== Cities ==
The cities and towns this route passes through from northeast to southwest are as follows (towns with fewer than 5,000 inhabitants are in italics).

=== Formosa Province ===
Travel: 497 km (km 1184 to 1681).

- Formosa Department: Formosa (km 1184) and Gran Guardia (km 1257).
- Pirané Department: Pirané (km 1282) and Palo Santo (km 1311).
- Patiño Department: Comandante Fontana (km 1356), Ibarreta (km 1378), Estanislao del Campo (km 1408), Pozo del Tigre (km 1437) and Las Lomitas (km 1472).
- Bermejo Department: Laguna Yema (km 1554) and Los Chiriguanos (km 1582).
- Matacos Department: Ingeniero Guillermo N. Juárez (km 1627).

=== Salta Province ===
Travel: 183 km (km 1681 to 1864).

- Rivadavia Department: Los Blancos (km 1711) and Coronel Juan Solá (km 1745).
- General José de San Martín Department: Dragones (km 1798).
