= Legislature of Tucumán =

Legislative body of Tucumán Province, Argentina

Type
- Type: Unicameral

Leadership
- President (Vice Governor): Osvaldo Jaldo (PJ/LP) since 10 December 2019
- Substitute President: Néstor Regino Amado (PJ/JDT) since 10 December 2019
- First Vice President: Juan Antonio Ruiz Olivares (PJ/JDT) since 10 December 2019

Structure
- Seats: 49 legislators
- Political groups: Government (34): Justicialist for Everyone (19); Peronist Loyalty (15); Opposition (15): Republican Force (5); Party for Social Justice (3); Hacemos Tucumán (1); LDS (1); UCR–Hipólito Yrigoyen (1); UCR (1); Progress and Renovation (1); Republican Democracy (1); Republican Values (1)
- Length of term: 4 years
- Authority: Constitution of Tucumán

Elections
- Voting system: Ley de lemas (D'Hondt method)
- Last election: 9 June 2019
- Next election: 2023

Website
- legislaturadetucuman.gob.ar

The Honourable Legislature of Tucumán Province (Spanish: Honorable Legislatura de la Provincia de Tucumán) is the unicameral legislative body of Tucumán Province, in Argentina. It convenes in the provincial capital, San Miguel de Tucumán.

It comprises 49 legislators, elected in three multi-member electoral sections every four years, though these electoral sections do not correspond to the 17 departments of Tucumán, but rather group different departments together. Elections are held under the ley de lemas system, with seats allocated using the D'Hondt method.

Its powers and responsibilities are established in the provincial constitution. The legislature is presided by the Vice Governor of Tucumán (presently Osvaldo Jaldo of the Justicialist Party), who is elected alongside the governor.

== History ==
The first legislative body in Tucumán was the Hall of Representatives, which convened for the first time on 25 January 1822, during the governorship of José Víctor Posse to write the first Constitution of Tucumán. During its first years of existence, the Hall of Representatives clashed with the colonial ayuntamiento, which did not yet recognize its authority. The Hall's work was interrupted by the period of anarchy that followed the uprising led by Martín de Bustamante. A new legislature would not convene until 7 January 1823.

The new constitution of the province, adopted in 1884, established a bicameral legislature comprising a Senate and a Chamber of Deputies. The Chamber of Deputies was due to be made up of one member for every six thousand inhabitants in the province, who would serve for three-year terms, and would be allowed to run for re-election. In addition, the Chamber would use staggered elections and renew a third of its members every year. The Senate, on the other hand, would count with one member for every 12 thousand inhabitants, who would serve for four-year terms and be allowed to run for re-election. The Senate would also count with staggered elections, and a fourth of its members would be renewed every year. A constitutional reform in 1907 extended legislative terms for both senators and deputies to four years, and established staggered elections by halves every two years.

This system was in place until 1990, when a new constitutional reform established a single legislative chamber by the name of "Honourable Legislature", counting with 40 members who would be elected for four-year terms and allowed to run for re-election.

== Electoral sections ==
Electoral Section	Departments	Legislators	Map
I – Capital	Capital	19	
II – Este	Burruyacú; Cruz Alta; Graneros; Leales; Simoca; Trancas	12	
III – Oeste	Chicligasta; Famaillá; Juan Bautista Alberdi; La Cocha; Lules; Monteros; Río Chico; Tafí del Valle; Tafí Viejo; Yerba Buena	18	
Total		49	
