= Gildo Insfrán =

Argentine politician

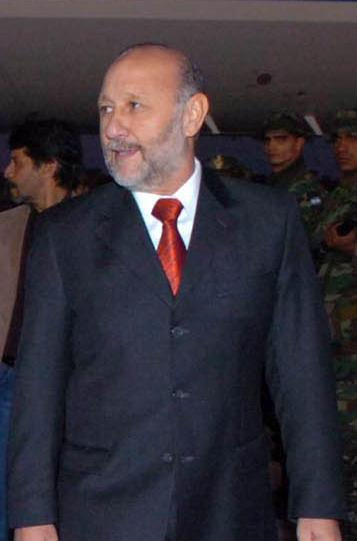

Governor of Formosa
- Incumbent
- Assumed office 10 December 1995
- Vice Governor: Floro Bogado (1995–2017); Eber Solís (2019–present)
- Preceded by: Vicente Joga

Vice Governor of Formosa
- In office 10 December 1987 – 10 December 1995
- Governor: Vicente Joga
- Preceded by: Lisbel Rivira
- Succeeded by: Floro Bogado

Personal details
- Born: 19 January 1951 (age 75) Laguna Blanca, Formosa, Argentina
- Party: Justicialist Party
- Profession: Veterinarian

Gildo Insfrán (born 19 January 1951) is an Argentine Justicialist Party (PJ) politician, who has been Governor of Formosa Province since 1995.

Having been close to former President Carlos Menem, Insfrán later became close to President Néstor Kirchner.

In 1999 he arranged to have Formosa's provincial constitution revised to allow him to be reelected indefinitely. Insfrán has been the target of numerous corruption allegations by journalists, activists and politicians like Jorge Lanata. He has also been criticized for the length of his tenure as governor of Formosa. His tenures as governor have been regarded favorably by inhabitants of Formosa.

Under his leadership the Justicialist Party has won eight consecutive gubernatorial elections in Formosa since 1995.

== Early life and education ==
Insfrán comes from a family of Paraguayan immigrants and is the youngest among his siblings. His father, who had fought in the Chaco War, died when Gildo was young, and his brother Miguel took on the responsibility of managing the family's finances.

Thanks to Miguel's support, Gildo was able to pursue his university education in Corrientes Province, where he successfully completed his studies and earned a degree in veterinary science at the National University of the Northeast, where he completed his studies and became a veterinarian. It was during his time in college that he first became involved in politics.

== Early career ==
During his time at university in the late 1960s and early 1970s, Insfrán began his political activism in the Revolutionary Communist Party (PCR), a minority Maoist party. However, before completing his studies, he had already joined the recently legalized Justicialist Party (PJ). Prior to formally engaging in institutional political activities, he practiced as a veterinarian.

His political career began in 1978, after sending a letter in February requesting employment from General Juan Carlos Colombo, the former governor of Formosa during the last military dictatorship. As a result, Gildo Insfrán assumed a position in the Ministry of Agriculture and Natural Resources of the province on May 5, 1978, until December 10, 1983, when he resigned to run in the legislative elections with the return of democracy.

In the provincial elections of 1983, he ran as a candidate for provincial deputy in the Formosa legislature on the Justicialist Party ticket, occupying the fifth position on the list. The Justicialist Party emerged victorious with 42.83% of the votes, and Insfrán was elected as a deputy. Due to the staggered system used in the election of provincial legislators, Insfrán would only serve half of a constitutional legislative term until the partial renewal in 1985. In those elections, Insfrán sought re-election and his list achieved a very narrow victory against the opposition Radical Civic Union, with 44.95% against 44.06%. Nonetheless, he was easily reelected to a full term until 1989.

=== Governor ===
In 1995, he formed his own party affiliated with the Justicialist Party and ran for governor of the province. It is said that Vicente Joga and Gildo Insfrán had made a pact to alternate in the positions of governor and vice governor. Insfrán was elected governor for a four-year term thanks to the "Ley de Lemas" (Law of Party Slates), which had been established in 1987.

From the beginning of his government, Insfrán focused on the construction of public infrastructure, such as the "blue roofs" throughout the province, which were implemented in schools, colleges, hospitals, police stations, and other government offices.

The governor expressed his desire to compete in the upcoming elections for re-election, which caused a rupture in the friendly relationship he had with Joga, who also wanted to run for governor. This disagreement led to a confrontation between the two congressmen. In late November 1998, the provincial court allowed Insfrán to run for governor again. This decision was made after Joga and the Radical Civic Union presented a declaratory action to the court to disqualify Insfrán as a gubernatorial candidate. Joga requested that the court interpret Article 129 of the provincial constitution, which states that a formula for the governorship of Formosa can only be reelected once.

At the beginning of 1999, provincial deputy Armando Cabrera accused Carlos Gerardo González, a judge of the Superior Court of Justice of Formosa, after tensions erupted within the Justicialist Party during the first week of March when Insfrán's collaborators accused González of stealing the judicial record.

On March 3, penal judge Ceferino Arroquigaray ordered the arrest of Judge Carlos González and the search of his offices to seize the record. González was arrested in the morning near his house while driving his car, which was intercepted by the police and taken to the central fire station in Formosa. This incident was considered an "institutional scandal" since a judge can only be arrested if he is previously removed through impeachment or caught in the act of committing a crime.

Approximately one month before the September 26 elections, a brawl broke out between those supporting Insfrán and those supporting Joga within the Formosa Legislature. As a result, Governor Insfrán closed the Legislature, which also helped him avoid a possible impeachment trial that would have ruined his chances of being a candidate. The hostility was so intense that Carlos Menem and Eduardo Duhalde — who represented a model for Insfrán and Joga, respectively kept away from the political campaign.

To achieve re-election, Insfrán promoted the reform of an article of the provincial constitution. During his second term, he called for a Constitutional Convention that amended the article, allowing for indefinite re-election.

In the 2003 elections, he won with 67.1% of the votes. In May 2003, then-President Néstor Kirchner arrived in the province and signed the Act of Historical Reparation together with Insfrán. Through this act, the Presidency of the Nation committed to settling old debts with Formosa, especially in terms of infrastructure. This led to the paving of National Route No. 81 "Padre Pacífico Scozzina," which connects the provincial capital with the neighboring province of Salta, among other projects.

During his administration, a water treatment plant was inaugurated, increasing irrigation capacity for the towns of El Potrillo and El Favorito community in Tronquito 1. Furthermore, all indigenous and creole populations in that part of the Bermejo department, as well as those in Ramón, were connected to the integrated provincial electricity service, ensuring they have 24-hour access to electricity.

In the 2007 elections, he was reelected again with 75% of the votes. On December 12, at 10:46 am, Insfrán was sworn in as governor for the next four years. During his new term, two new hospitals were built in the interior of Formosa, including the one in Laguna Blanca (15 kilometers from the Paraguayan border and over 200 kilometers from the capital of Formosa) and the Hospital El Espinillo.

On June 30, 2011, Gildo Insfrán changed the Law of Party Slates. The project to eliminate the sub-ticket system only for the Governor category was presented by deputy Alberto Sánchez in the Legislature, arguing that this change responded "to the society's request to clarify the electoral system." However, candidates competing against Insfrán claimed that the reform of the Law of Party Slates, far from favoring pluralism, facilitated Governor Gildo Insfrán's re-election because he didn't want to risk losing the provincial elections to the rival Frente Amplio party. Ricardo Buryaile stated, "The government was clearly weakened: it reformed the law of party slates because it was losing the elections." Despite protests from opposition members, the project was approved by the majority of the ruling party in just half an hour.

On October 23, Insfrán won for the fifth consecutive time in the general elections with 76% of the votes. Some media outlets in the province reported a series of incidents in the area of Ingeniero Juárez before the elections. The news portal Opinión Ciudadana reported that José Palma's van, an associate of Francisco Nazar, the Catholic priest who competed against Insfrán for the governorship, was set on fire.

On 12 October, the candidate for mayor José Luis Maldonado from the Frente Amplio party and a companion of Nazar, was attacked with a knife by a political operative. On 15 October, Pablo Egues, the authority of the Wichí Esperanza Community, died due to the extortion he suffered in his final days by Mayor Cristino Mendoza, who broke into his home accompanied by a group of thugs to force Egues to hand over the ID cards of the people in his indigenous community for use in the elections. Egues resisted, and the violence escalated to the point where the mayor's lawyer destroyed Egues' house with his car. This tragic event was condemned by the Permanent Assembly for Human Rights.

However, it was also reported that the members of the Wichí Barrio Viejo community were detained and forced to vote. In parallel, the AMRA-Foro Médico Ciudadano de Formosa, accredited to participate in the elections as one of the observers, released a report revealing that a total of 10,000 Paraguayans (including a Paraguayan government official) crossed into Formosa's territory to vote in the elections, using only two border crossings, without including the Friendship Bridge, where pedestrians enter without any controls. People close to Insfrán's circle claimed that the elections were conducted normally and that 67.3% of the electoral roll participated.

Gildo Insfrán assumed office on December 11 for the 2011-2015 term.

In the elections on October 25, 2015, Insfrán emerged as the winner with 73.3% of the votes, thus beginning his sixth consecutive term.

In the 2017 primary elections (PASO), it was announced that the electoral justice would use a system to register the fingerprints of voters in the province to prevent electoral fraud, due to reports of Paraguayan nationals crossing the border into Argentina to vote in Formosa.

Insfrán was re-elected in 1999, 2003, 2007, 2011, 2015, 2019 and 2023.

== Boudougate ==
On March 30, 2015, Carlos Rívolo, federal prosecutor in the Ciccone Case, also known as Boudougate, asked Judge Sebastian Casanello to investigate the participation of Insfrán as well as various other persons, including Vice President Amado Boudou, in a maneuver related to the restructuring of the public debt of the province of Formosa with the help of a shell company called The Old Fund.

The case against Insfrán was dismissed by a provincial court in May 2022. The judge in charge of the case justified his ruling by stating that there were no irregularities in the debt restructuring process and that the company "The Old Fund" had never been contracted by the provincial government to act as an intermediary between the province and the national government.

== Controversies ==
=== Treatment of indigenous people ===
On 23 November 2010 a Toba man and a police officer died when the government ordered the police to clear a camp of indigenous Toba protesters who were blocking National Route 86 in response to the government's decision to build an agricultural research institute on land that had been granted to the Colonia La Primavera community by the Territorial Emergency Law 26.160, which prevented the expulsion of indigenous communities from their ancestral lands.

The minister of government of Formosa, Jorge Gonzáles, claimed that the police were attacked by the protesters when they entered a property that had been occupied by a group of Toba protesters, and that said group had stolen a police officers service weapon that had been thrown onto the ground and abandoned by accident. While the activist and INADI functionary Félix Díaz claimed that the police and a group of unidentified civilians attacked the protesters without provocation and planted a gun to blame the indigenous protesters for the death of the police officer.

On 14 April 2017 a Wichí teacher and activist named Agustín Santillán was detained by the provincial police and jailed for over six months on pretrial detention after being accused of participating in the burglaries of several homes and the looting of numerous stores that had occurred in his hometown of Ingeniero Juárez earlier that month. The area of Ingeniero Juárez had been affected by numerous floods in the previous month and Santillán had participated in several protests that denounced the lack of help from the provincial government in the reconstruction process. While in jail Santillán claimed the police had manufactured the cause and that his detention had nothing to do with the looting, that he claimed had been committed by people he doesn't work with, and everything to do with his political activism. His detention was denounced by the local branch of Amnesty International and numerous Argentine human rights organizations. He was released on 25 October 2017 after the appeals court of Formosa freed him after analysing the case and finding no evidence that he had actually committed any crime.

== Personal life ==
Insfrán has two daughters with Teresa Baldus, Sofia and Yanina. The couple also had a son, Gildo Miguel Insfrán, who committed suicide on August 5, 2003, at the age of seventeen. He shot himself in the right temple with a 9mm pistol. The motive for the suicide has never been publicly clarified.

Preceded by Vicente Joga	Governor of Formosa; 1995–present	Incumbent
