= Graneros Department =

Coordinates: 27.6467°S 65.4403°W

Graneros Department is a department located in the southeast of the Tucumán Province, Argentina. At the 2015 census, the department had a population of 5,263. The town of Graneros is the department’s seat.

== Geography ==
Graneros has a total area of 1,678 km². Two rivers, the Marapa and San Francisco, flow across the department and empty in the Rio Hondo Lake in the northeast end. There are hot springs in the Taco Ralo area.

=== Adjacent departments ===
- Simoca Department – north
- Juan Bautista Alberdi Department – west
- La Cocha Department – west

It also borders the provinces of Santiago del Estero in the east and Catamarca in the south.

=== Towns and communities ===
- Árboles Grandes
- Graneros
- La Cañada
- Lamadrid
- Sol de Mayo
- Taco Ralo

== Transportation infrastructure ==
=== Major highways ===
- National Route 157
- Tucuman Province Routes: 308 and 334.
