= Eduardo Castex =

- City and Municipality
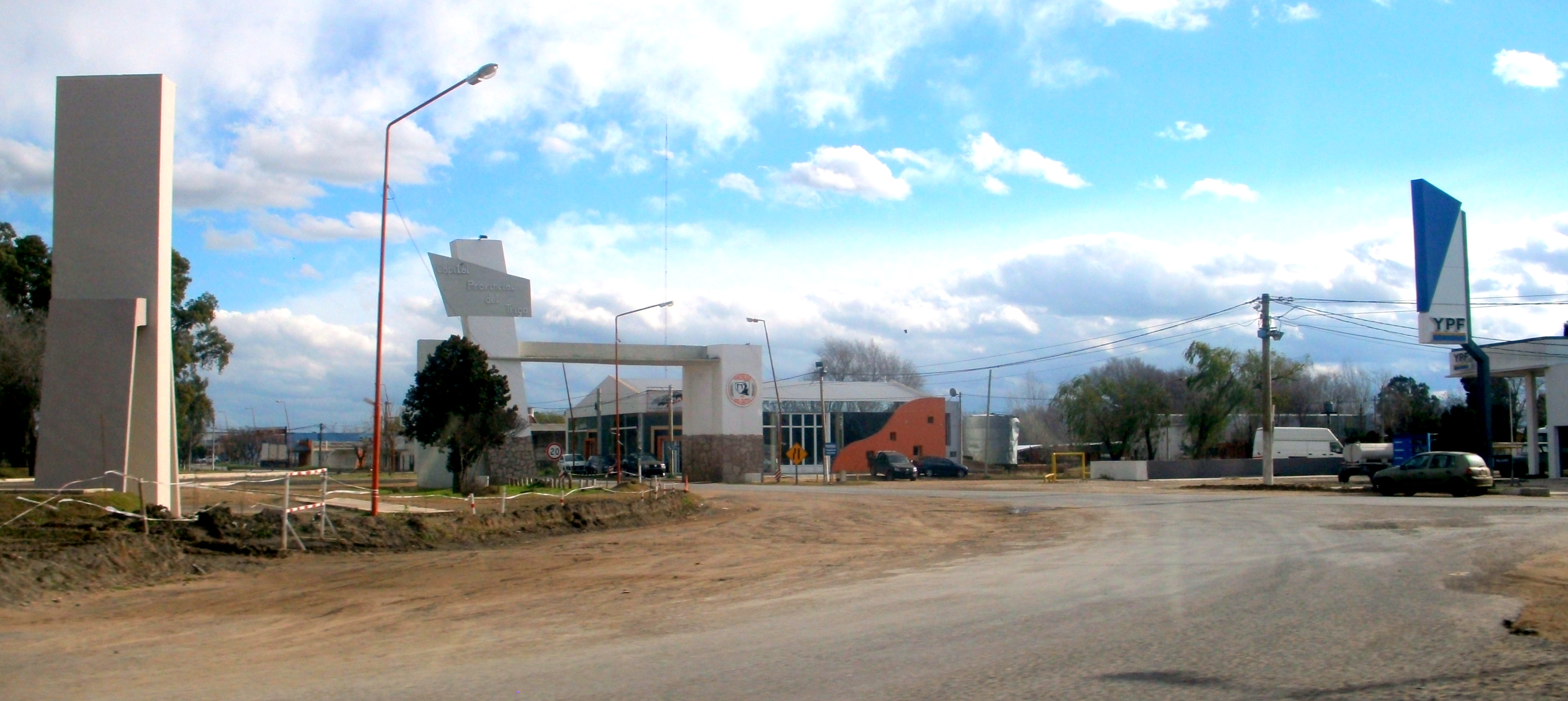

- Location within Argentina Location within La Pampa Province
- Coordinates: 35°54′S 64°18′W
- Country: Argentina
- Province: La Pampa
- Department: Conhelo, Trenel
- Time zone: UTC−3 (ART)

Eduardo Castex is a small city, capital of Conhelo, in La Pampa Province, Argentina. Its name comes from the founder Ingeniero (Engineer) Eduardo Castex, in the first years of the 20th century. The city received its name in 1928.

== See also ==
- List of largest cuckoo clocks
