= Hotel Savoy (Tucumán) =

Former hotel in San Miguel de Tucumán, Argentina

General information
- Type: Hotel
- Location: Sarmiento Avenue and Maipú Street, San Miguel de Tucumán, Tucumán, Argentina
- Opened: 1911
- Closed: 1983
- Cost: m$n 1,000,000

Technical details
- Floor count: 4
- Floor area: 5,634 m^{2} (60,640 sq ft)

Design and construction
- Architects: Emilio Hugé and Vicente Colmegna
- Developer: Faustino da Rosa

Other information
- Number of rooms: 120

The Hotel Savoy was a hotel in San Miguel de Tucumán, Tucumán Province, Argentina. It stood between Maipú Street and Sarmiento Avenue, next to the former legislature building and the Teatro San Martín. The building later housed the Casino de Tucumán, which remained closed for renovation works as of 2025.

== History ==
The hotel was built as part of a 1908 project by entrepreneur Faustino da Rosa to construct a theatre, hotel and casino on the same city block. The proposal was approved by the legislature on 18 August 1908, and the hotel opened in 1911. The complex was designed by Emilio Hugé and Vicente Colmegna at a cost of m$n 1,000,000. The hotel was originally owned by a business group led by José Emerenciano Talavera.

In 1929, the casino was closed after the enactment of a law against gambling. The rest of the complex then went into decline, and the hotel closed in 1944. The hotel, theatre and casino building were subsequently purchased by the provincial government for m$n 780,000. The hotel was remodelled and reopened in 1945 under provincial administration.

In 1959, governor Celestino Gelsi reopened the casino in the dining halls and winter garden of the hotel building. In 1983, the Provincial Senate moved into the building, ending the Savoy's hotel operations. In 1991, following the establishment of the unicameral Legislature of Tucumán, the casino was re-established and provincial legislative offices remained in the building. Those offices were vacated in 2012 after the construction of the new legislative palace.

In 2020, during the COVID-19 pandemic, the casino suspended activities in order to comply with health protocols and to carry out works for its reopening. As of 2025, it remained closed for renovation works.

== Description ==
The hotel had 120 rooms with private bathrooms arranged over three storeys and a basement. The ground floor contained gambling rooms, ballrooms, dining rooms, a gymnasium and a fencing room. The buildings in the complex, including the Savoy, were connected by surrounding gardens.
