= Bermejo Department =

Bermejo Department may refer to:

- Bermejo Department, Chaco
- Bermejo Department, Formosa
