= Olta =

Olta or OLTA may refer to:

== People ==
- Olta Boka (born 1991), Albanian singer
- Olta Xhaçka (born 1979), Albanian politician

== Places ==
- Olta, Argentina

== Music ==
- Our Love to Admire, a 2007 album by Interpol
