= Villa San Martín =

- Town and municipality
- Location of the locality in Argentina Villa San Martín (Argentina)
- Coordinates: 31°30′59″S 68°21′13″W
- Country: Argentina
- Province: San Juan
- Department: San Martín
- Elevation: 593 m (1,946 ft)

Population (2010)
  - Total: 1,899
- Time zone: UTC−3 (ART)

Villa San Martín is a locality located in the south-central province of San Juan. Located 18.7 km (11.6 mi) east of the city of San Juan, Argentina, it is the seat of the San Martín Department.

San Martín is an urban area that concentrates the main institutional and administrative buildings (municipality) of the San Martín Department; however, the rural way of life has an important significance, and its economy is primarily centered on the production of vines, primarily winemaking.

== Geography ==
=== Population ===
In the 2010 census, Villa San Martín had a population of 1,899.
