= San Javier Department, Misiones =

San Javier Departamento San Javier
- Department
- Interactive map of San Javier
- Country: Argentina
- Seat: San Javier

Area
  - Total: 536 km^{2} (207 sq mi)

Population (2022)
  - Total: 23,503
  - Density: 43.8/km^{2} (114/sq mi)

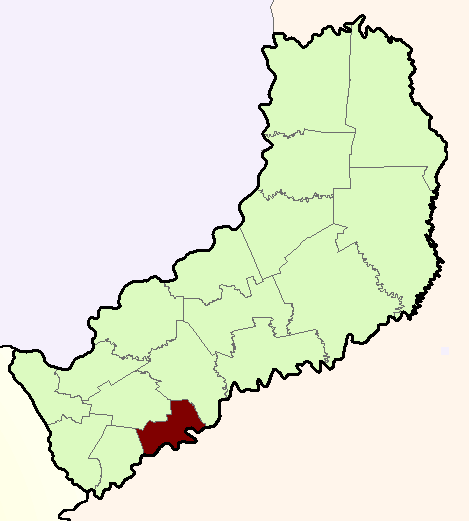

San Javier is a department of the province of Misiones (Argentina).
