= Laishí Department =

Laishí Departamento Laishí
- Department
- Interactive map of Laishí
- Country: Argentina
- Seat: San Francisco de Laishi

Area
  - Total: 3,480 km^{2} (1,340 sq mi)

Population (2022)
  - Total: 19,303
  - Density: 5.55/km^{2} (14.4/sq mi)

Laishí is a department of the province of Formosa (Argentina).
