= Río Chico Department =

Río Chico Department may refer to:

- Río Chico Department, Santa Cruz
- Río Chico Department, Tucumán
