= El Carmen Department =

El Carmen Departamento El Carmen
- Department
- Interactive map of El Carmen
- Country: Argentina
- Seat: El Carmen

Area
  - Total: 912 km^{2} (352 sq mi)

Population (2022)
  - Total: 122,366
  - Density: 134/km^{2} (348/sq mi)

El Carmen is a department of Jujuy Province (Argentina). As of the 2022 census, it had a population of 122,366.
