= Loventué Department =

Coordinates: 36.2164°S 65.4372°W

- Department
- Location of Loventué Department within La Pampa Province
- Country: Argentina
- Province: La Pampa
- Capital: Victorica

Area
  - Total: 9,235 km^{2} (3,566 sq mi)

Population (2022)
  - Total: 9,322
  - Density: 1.009/km^{2} (2.614/sq mi)
- Time zone: ART

Loventué Department is a department of Argentina in La Pampa Province. The capital city of the department is Victorica.
