= Pilagás Department =

Pilagás Departamento Pilagás
- Department
- Interactive map of Pilagás
- Country: Argentina
- Seat: El Espinillo

Area
  - Total: 3,041 km^{2} (1,174 sq mi)

Population (2022)
  - Total: 19,116
  - Density: 6.286/km^{2} (16.28/sq mi)

Pilagás is a department of the province of Formosa (Argentina).
