= Santa Bárbara Department =

Santa Bárbara Department may refer to:

- Santa Bárbara Department, Jujuy in Jujuy Province, Argentina
- Santa Bárbara Department, Honduras
