= General Belgrano Department, La Rioja =

General Belgrano Departamento General Belgrano
- Department
- Interactive map of General Belgrano
- Country: Argentina
- Seat: Olta

Area
  - Total: 2,556 km^{2} (987 sq mi)

Population (2022)
  - Total: 7,618
  - Density: 2.980/km^{2} (7.719/sq mi)

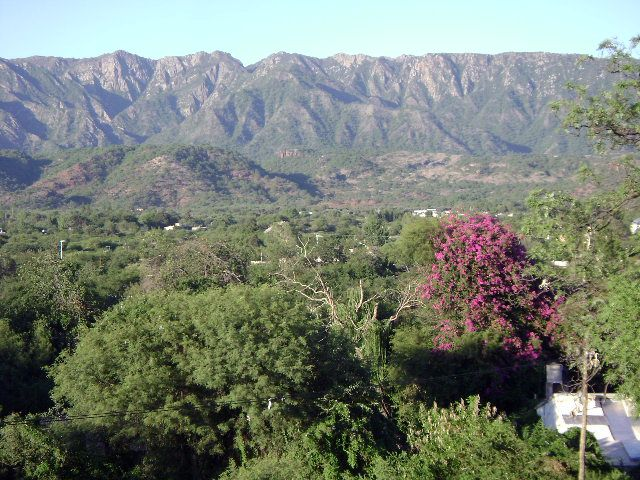
General Belgrano Department

General Belgrano is a department of La Rioja Province (Argentina).
