= Mataco =

Mataco may refer to:

- Mataco people, or Wichí, an ethnic group of South America
- Mataco language, or Wichí, a language, or a language group, of South America
- USS Mataco (AT-86), an American ship
- Tolypeutes matacus, known in Portuguese as mataco, a species of armadillo

== See also ==
- Matacoan languages, a language family of South America
- Matacos Department, in Argentina
