= General San Martín Department =

General San Martín Department may refer to:

- General San Martín Department, Córdoba in Argentina
- General San Martín Department, La Rioja in Argentina
- General San Martín Department, Salta in Argentina
