= Chicligasta Department =

Department of Argentina

Coordinates: 27.3458°S 65.5928°W

Chicligasta Department is a department located in the southwest area of the Tucumán Province, Argentina. At the 2001 census, the department had a population of 75,133, making it the fourth most populous in the province and the most populous one in southern Tucumán. Chicligasta’s largest city, and its Department seat as well, is Concepción, with a population of about 50,000 (2010 census [INDEC]).

== Geography ==
The department has a total area of 1,267 km. Plains cover the east portion, where most of the population dwells, and the west is mountainous and almost uninhabited. Part of the latter area is included in the Campo de los Alisos National Park and the Cochuna Natural Reserve

The highest peaks in the department are the Cerro del Bolsón (5550 m), Cerro de los Cóndores (5450m), and the Cerro de la Bolsa (5300 m) located in its westernmost portion, alongside the border with the Catamarca Province. They are part of a range called “Nevados del Aconquija” or simply, Aconquija.

The Gastona River is the principal waterway. Other rivers are the Cochuna, de las Cañas, Seco and Medinas.

=== Adjacent districts ===
- Monteros Department – north
- Simoca Department – east and southeast
- Río Chico Department – south
- Catamarca Province – west

=== Cities, towns and Rural communes ===
- Alpachiri and El Molino
- Alto Verde and Los Gucheas
- Arcadia
- Concepción
- Gastona and Belicha
- Ingenio La Trinidad
- Medinas

== Transportation infrastructure ==
=== Major highways ===
- National Route 38
- Tucumán Province Route 327
- Tucumán Province Route 329
- Tucumán Province Route 330
- Tucuman Province Route 331
- Tucuman Province Route 365
