= General San Martín Department, La Rioja =

General San Martín Departamento General San Martín
- Department
- Interactive map of General San Martín
- Country: Argentina
- Seat: Ulapes

Area
  - Total: 5,034 km^{2} (1,944 sq mi)

Population (2022)
  - Total: 5,019
  - Density: 0.9970/km^{2} (2.582/sq mi)

General San Martín is a department of La Rioja Province (Argentina).
