= Conhelo Department =

Department of Argentina in La Pampa Province

Coordinates: 35.9158°S 64.2958°W

- Department
- Location of Conhelo Department within La Pampa Province
- Country: Argentina
- Province: La Pampa

Area
  - Total: 5,052 km^{2} (1,951 sq mi)

Population (2022)
  - Total: 15,186
  - Density: 3.006/km^{2} (7.785/sq mi)
- Time zone: ART

Conhelo Department is a department of Argentina in La Pampa Province. The chief city of the department is Conhelo.
