= Trenel Department =

Trenel Departamento Trenel
- Department
- Country: Argentina
- Seat: Trenel

Area
  - Total: 1,955 km^{2} (755 sq mi)

Population (2022)
  - Total: 5,702
  - Density: 2.917/km^{2} (7.554/sq mi)

Trenel is a department of the province of La Pampa (Argentina).
