= Patiño Department =

Patiño Departamento Patiño
- Department
- Interactive map of Patiño
- Country: Argentina
- Seat: Comandante Fontana

Area
  - Total: 24,502 km^{2} (9,460 sq mi)

Population (2022)
  - Total: 81,819
  - Density: 3.3393/km^{2} (8.6487/sq mi)

Patiño is a department of the province of Formosa in Argentina.
