= Independencia Department, La Rioja =

Independencia Department
- Department
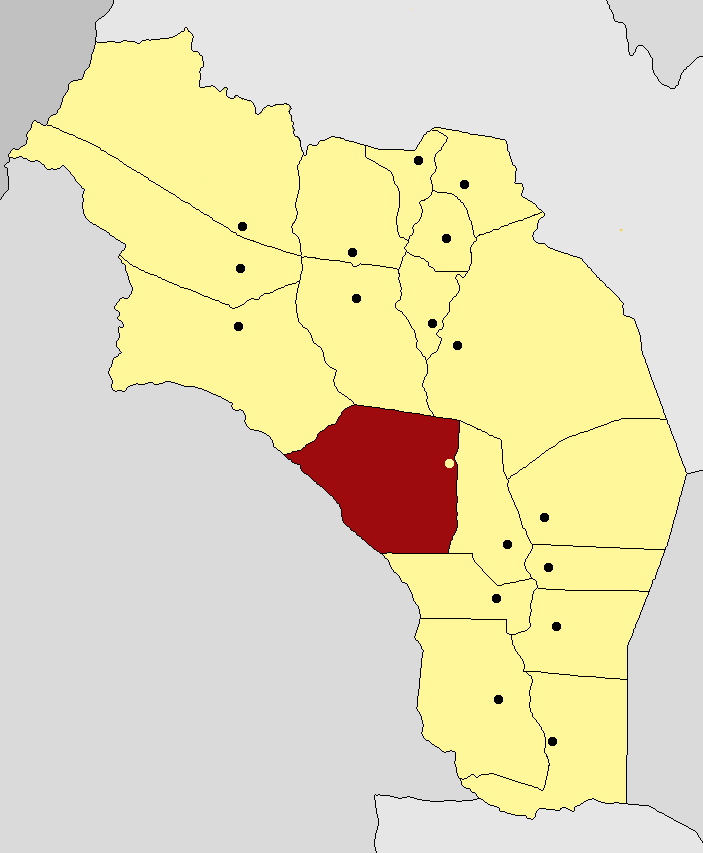
- Location of Independencia Department within La Rioja Province

- Location of Independencia Department in Argentina
- Coordinates: 30°S 70°W
- Country: Argentina
- Province: La Rioja Province

Area
  - Total: 7,120 km^{2} (2,750 sq mi)

Population (2022)
  - Total: 2,401
  - Density: 0.337/km^{2} (0.873/sq mi)
- Demonym: Independense
- Time zone: UTC-3 (ART)
- Postal code: H3716
- Area code: 03732

Independencia is a department of La Rioja Province (Argentina).

== History ==
The department was created by Law 108 of 28 September 1864; 161 years ago. This law also established Patquía as the head town.

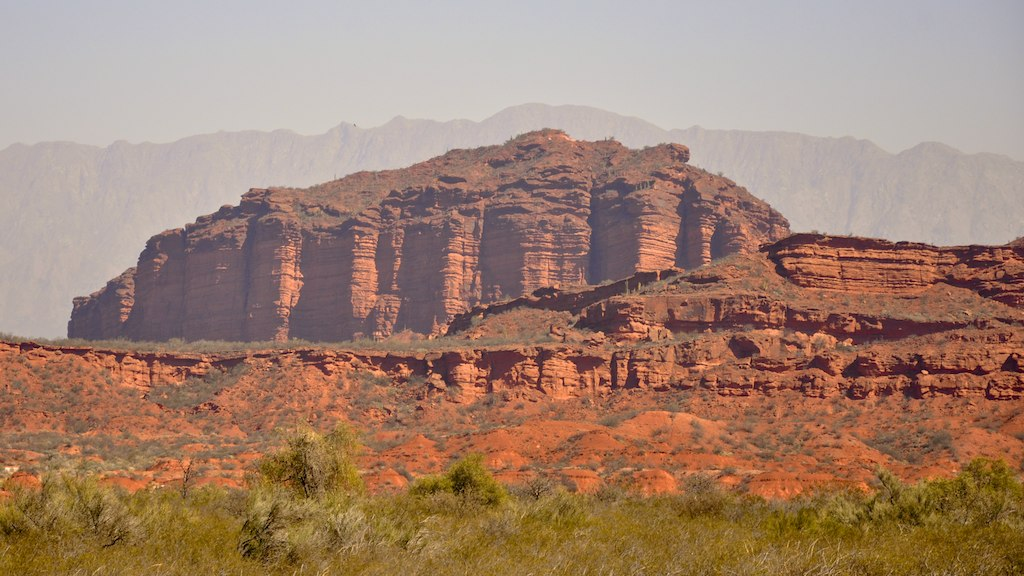
Independencia

== Geography ==
The department has 7,120 km² and borders to the north with the departments of Capital, Chilecito and Coronel Felipe Varela, to the east with the department of Angel Vicente Peñaloza, to the west with the province of San Juan and to the south with the department of Facundo Quiroga.

== Gallery ==
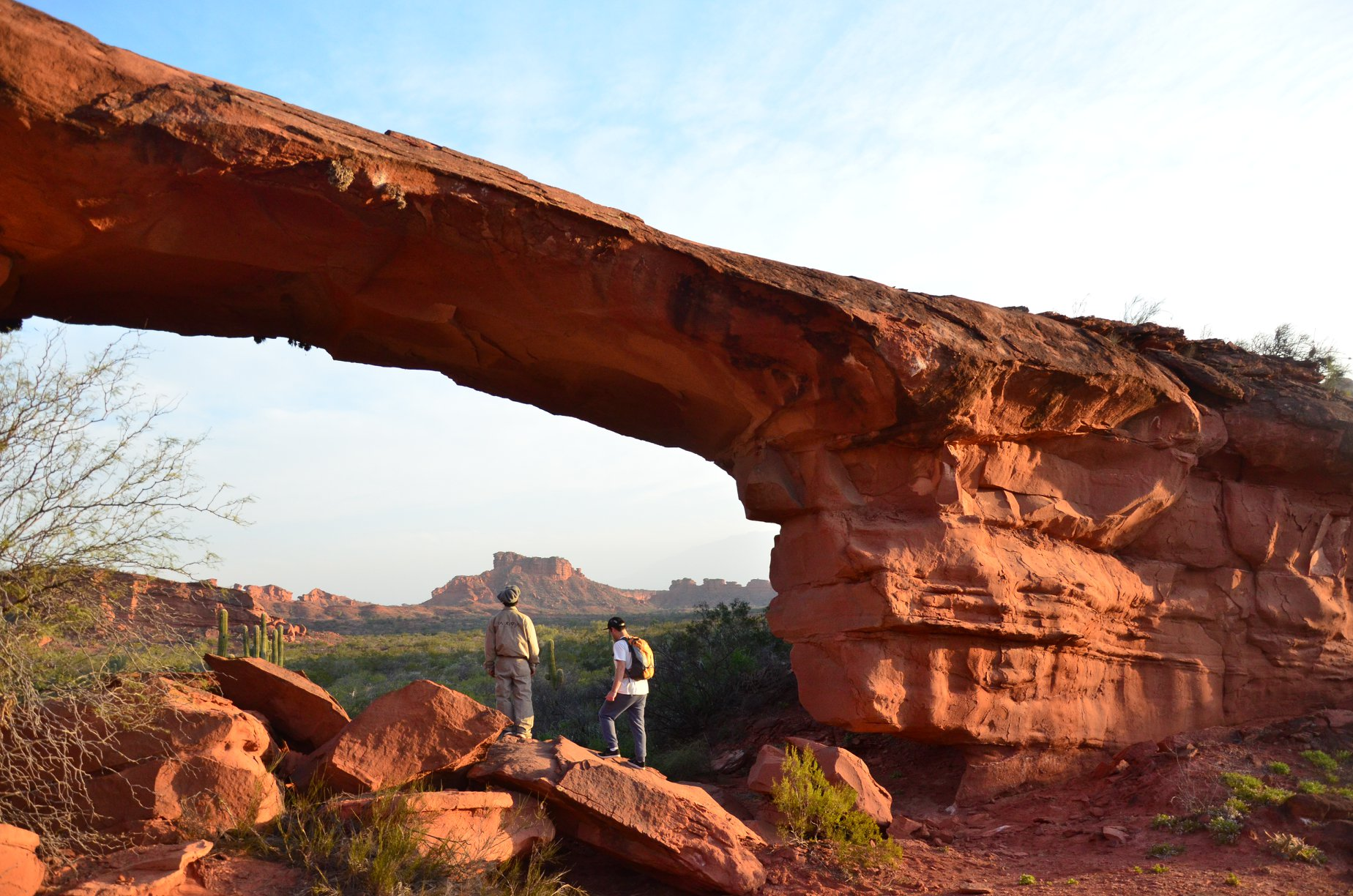
View of Los Colorados Provincial Reserve

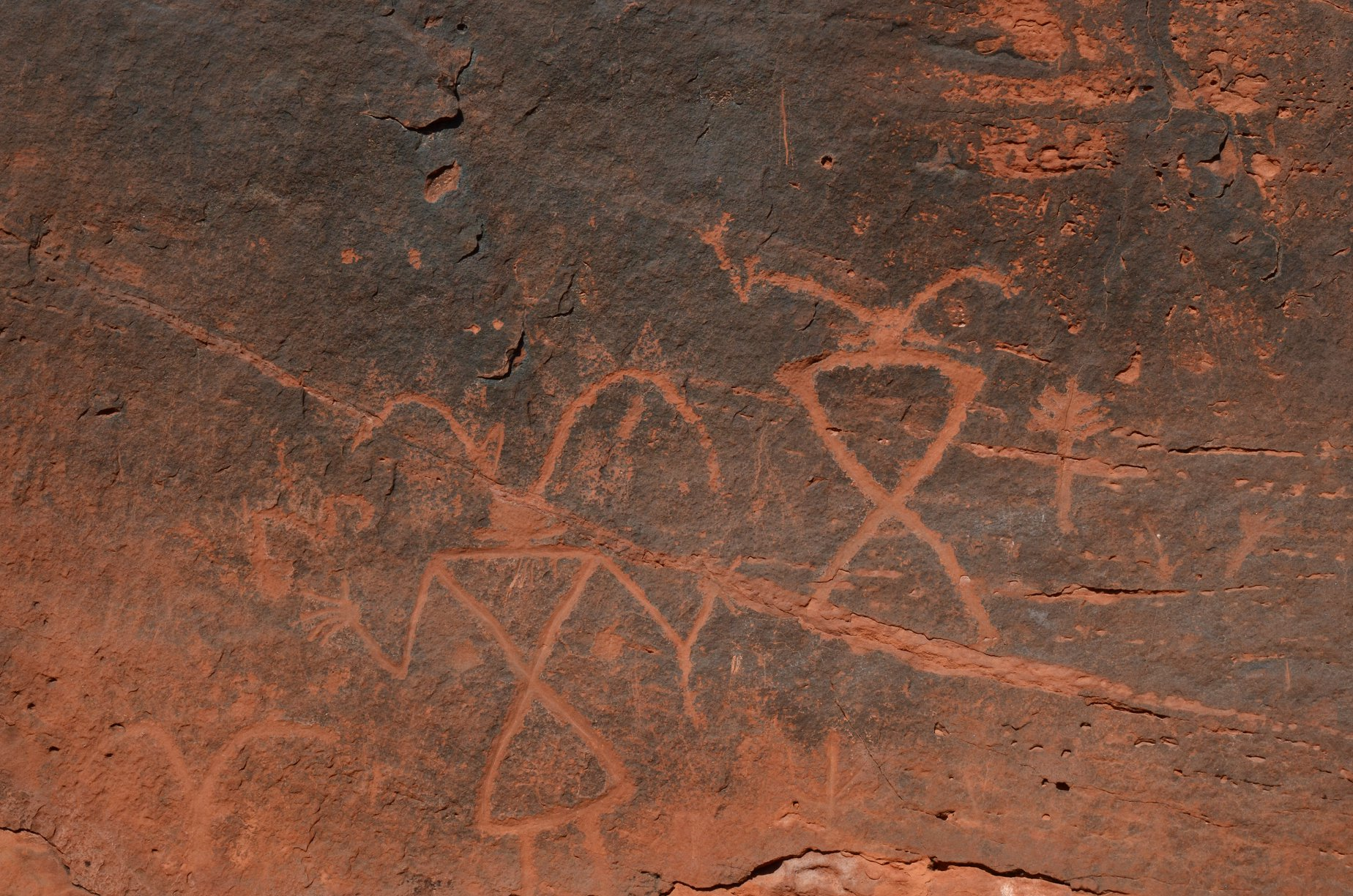
Rock paintings in Los Colorados

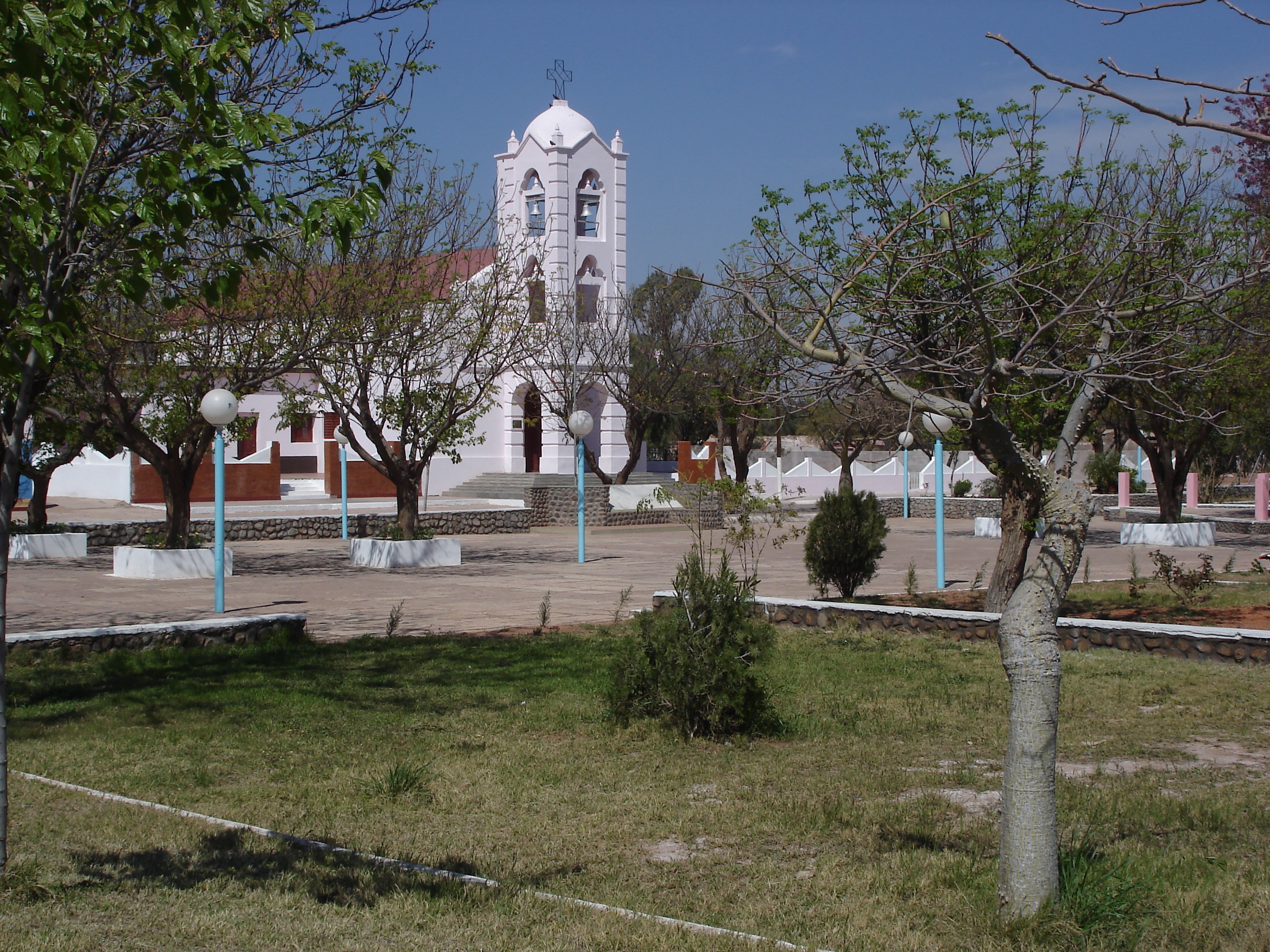
View to the Church of the town of Patquía

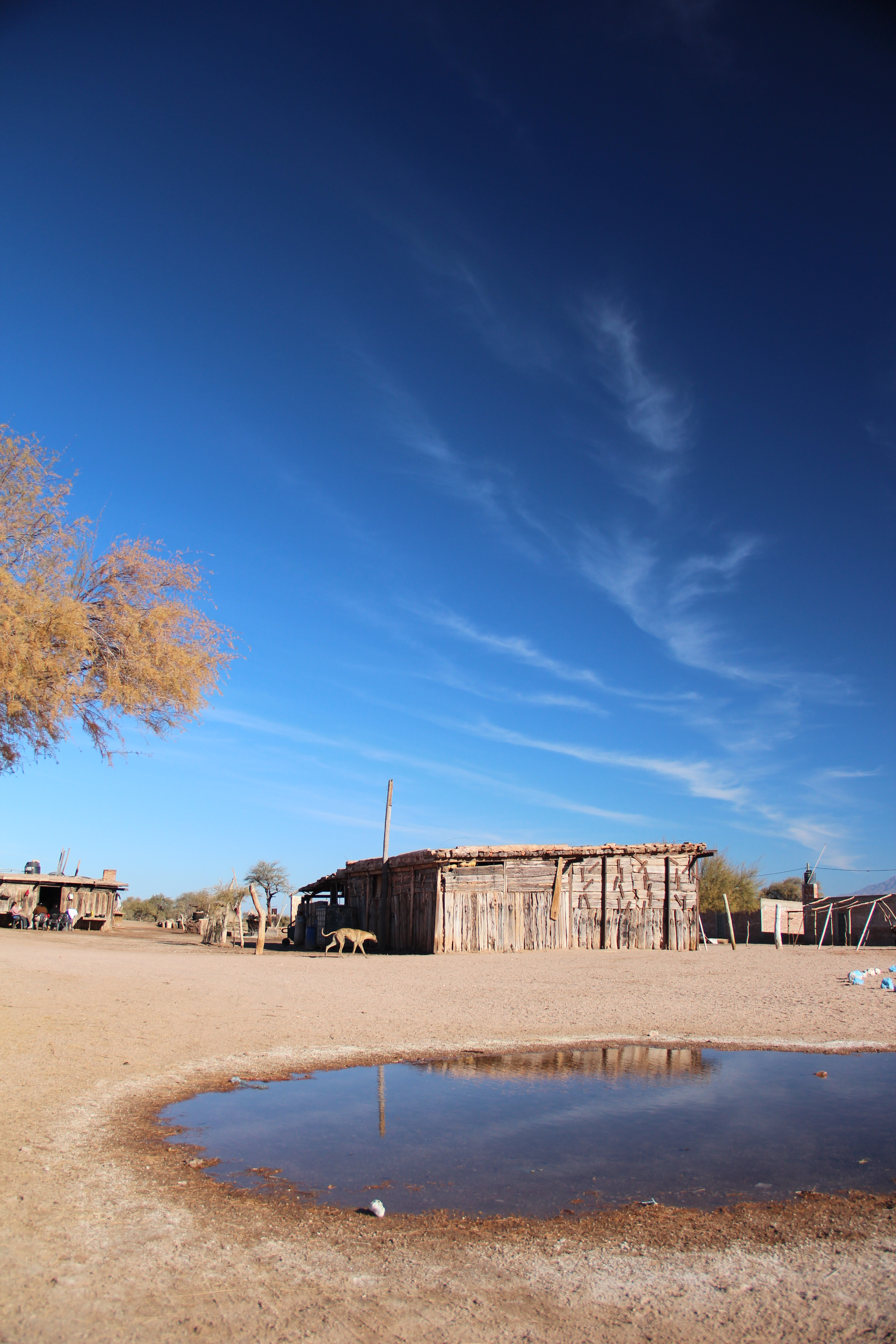
View of a home in the town of Patquía

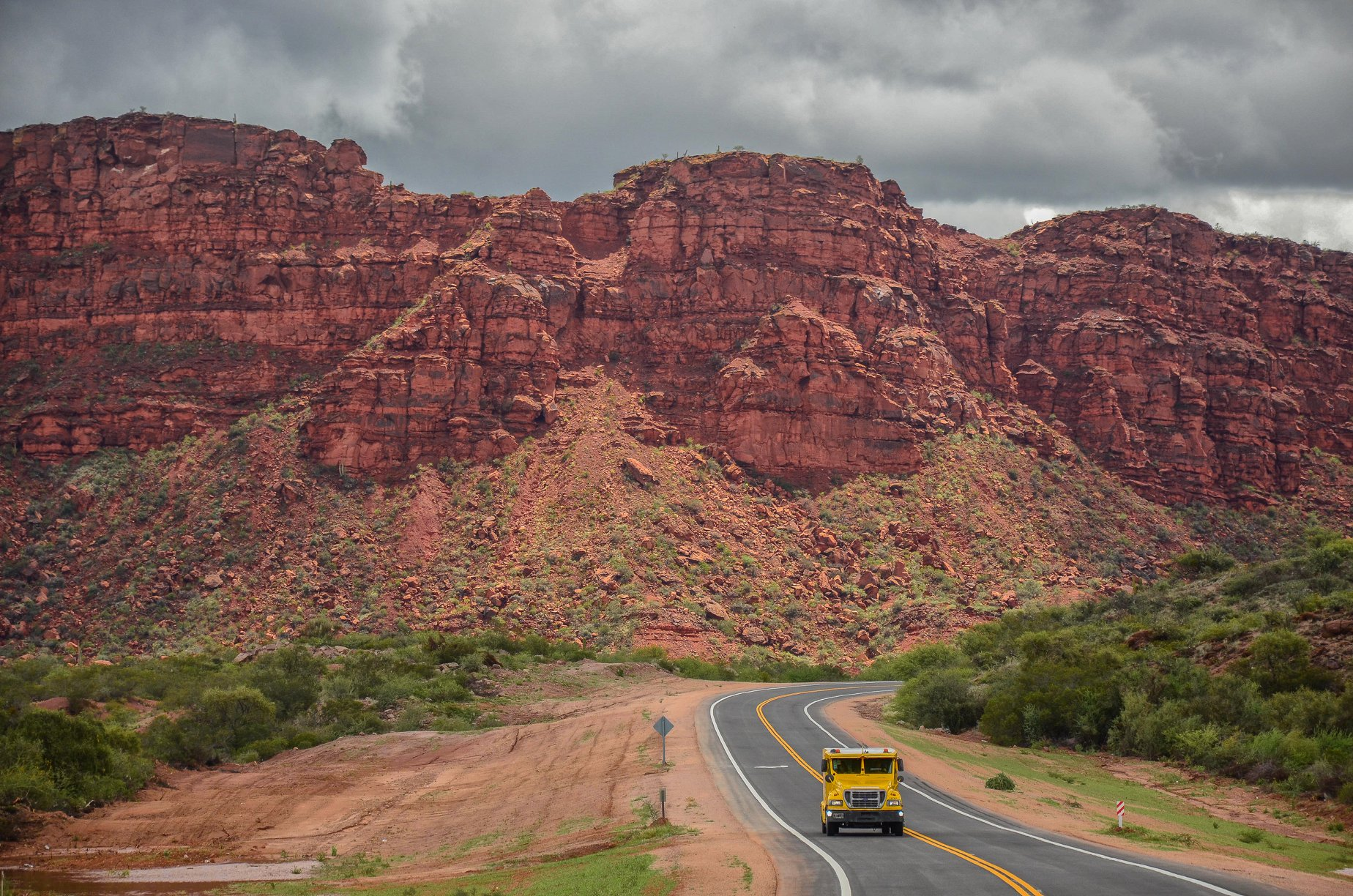
Panoramic view of Los Colorados Provincial Reserve
