= Pirané Department =

Pirané Departamento Pirané
- Department
- Interactive map of Pirané
- Country: Argentina
- Seat: Pirané

Area
  - Total: 8,425 km^{2} (3,253 sq mi)

Population (2022)
  - Total: 72,804
  - Density: 8.641/km^{2} (22.38/sq mi)

Pirané is a department of the province of Formosa in Argentina.
