= Rosario Vera Peñaloza Department =

Rosario Vera Peñaloza Departamento Rosario Vera Peñaloza
- Department
- Interactive map of Rosario Vera Peñaloza
- Country: Argentina
- Seat: Chepes

Area
  - Total: 6,114 km^{2} (2,361 sq mi)

Population (2022)
  - Total: 15,783
  - Density: 2.581/km^{2} (6.686/sq mi)

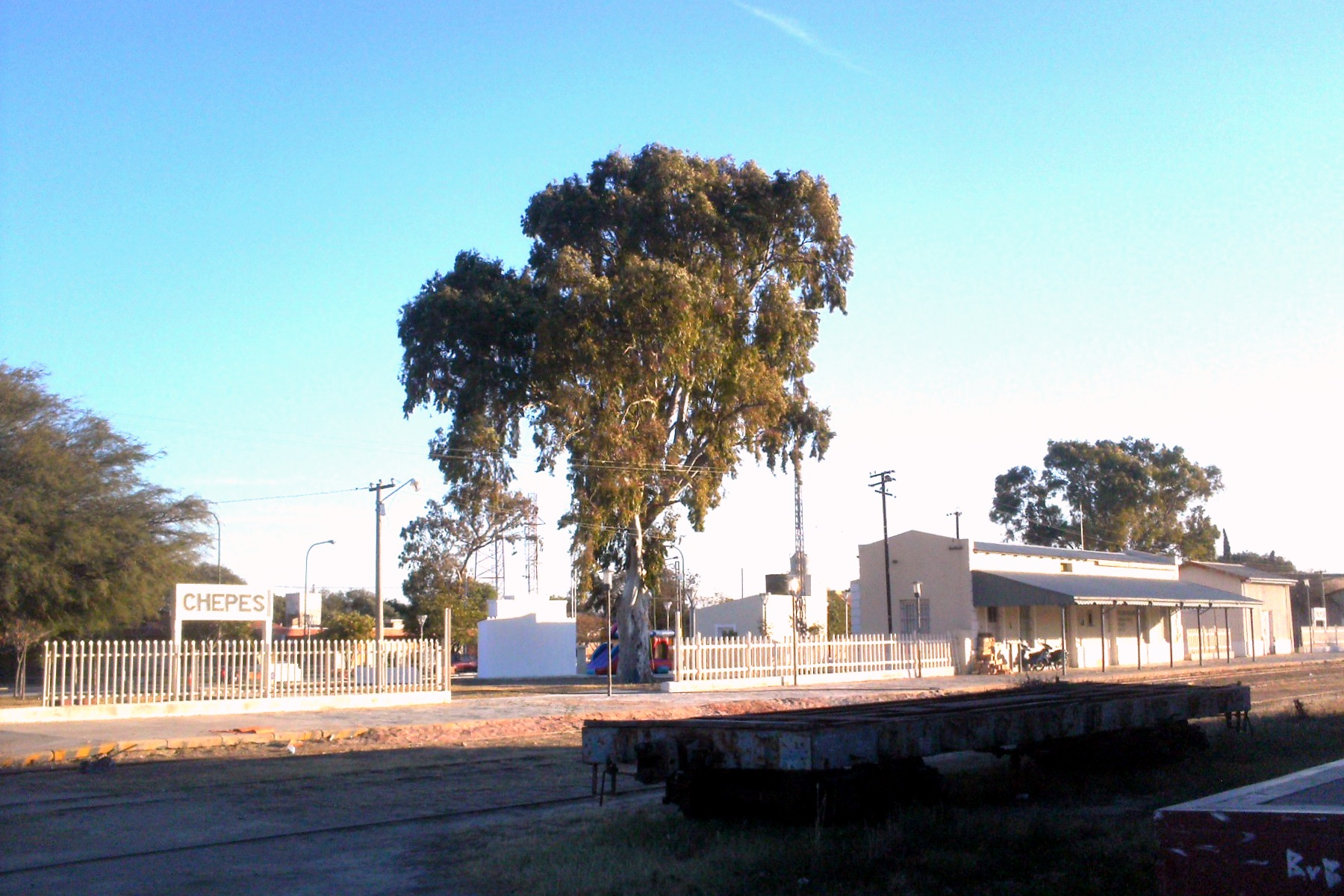
Rosario Vera Peñaloza

Rosario Vera Peñaloza is a department of the province of La Rioja (Argentina).
