= Nogoyá Department =

Nogoyá Departamento Nogoyá
- Department
- Location of Nogoyá Department within Entre Ríos Province
- Coordinates: 32°23′44″S 59°47′17″W
- Country: Argentina
- Province: Entre Ríos Province
- Seat: Nogoyá

Government
  - Mayor: Rafael Cavagna, UCR

Area
  - Total: 4,282 km^{2} (1,653 sq mi)

Population (2022)
  - Total: 43,195
  - Density: 10.09/km^{2} (26.13/sq mi)

Nogoyá is a department of the province of Entre Ríos, Argentina. It is the eighth smallest province with an area of 4,282 km^{2} (1,653 sq mi) and the seventh least populated, with 39 026 inhabitants according to the 2010 census.

It is bordered to the west by the Diamante department, to the north by the Paraná and Villaguay departments, to the south by the Victoria and Gualeguay departments and to the east by the Tala department. The department is crossed by the Nogoyá stream.

According to the methodology used by the INDEC for the 1991, 2001 and 2010 censuses, the Nogoyá department comprised 8 localities: Aranguren, Betbeder or Villa Matilde, Don Cristóbal (in the jurisdiction of Don Cristóbal 2 °), Febre, Hernández, Lucas González, Nogoyá, XX of September.
