= San Antonio Department, Jujuy =

San Antonio
- Department
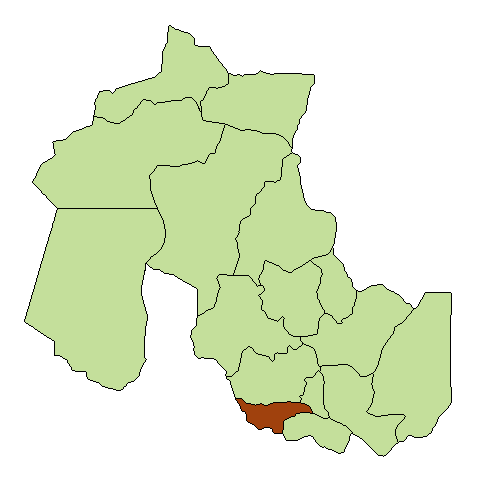
- Country: Argentina
- Province: Jujuy

Area
  - Total: 690 km^{2} (270 sq mi)

Population (2022)
  - Total: 6,729
  - Density: 9.8/km^{2} (25/sq mi)

San Antonio Department is a department located in the Jujuy Province of Argentina.
