= Villaguay Department =

Villaguay Departamento Villaguay
- Department
- Location of Villaguay Department within Entre Ríos Province
- Country: Argentina
- Province: Entre Ríos Province
- Seat: Villaguay

Area
  - Total: 6,753 km^{2} (2,607 sq mi)

Population (2022)
  - Total: 55,796
  - Density: 8.262/km^{2} (21.40/sq mi)

Villaguay is a department of the province of Entre Ríos, Argentina.
