= San José de Feliciano Department =

San José de Feliciano Departamento San José de Feliciano
- Department
- Location of San José de Feliciano Department within Entre Ríos Province
- Country: Argentina
- Province: Entre Ríos Province
- Seat: San José de Feliciano

Area
  - Total: 3,143 km^{2} (1,214 sq mi)

Population (2022)
  - Total: 16,803
  - Density: 5.346/km^{2} (13.85/sq mi)

San José de Feliciano is a department of the province of Entre Ríos, Argentina.
