= Palpalá Department =

Palpalá Departamento Palpalá
- Department
- Interactive map of Palpalá
- Coordinates: 24°15′09″S 65°12′12″W
- Country: Argentina
- Seat: Palpalá

Area
  - Total: 467 km^{2} (180 sq mi)

Population (2022)
  - Total: 65,541
  - Density: 140/km^{2} (363/sq mi)

Palpalá is a department of the province of Jujuy (Argentina).
