= Doctor Manuel Belgrano Department =

Doctor Manuel Belgrano Departamento Doctor Manuel Belgrano
- Department
- Interactive map of Doctor Manuel Belgrano
- Country: Argentina
- Seat: San Salvador de Jujuy

Area
  - Total: 1,917 km^{2} (740 sq mi)

Population (2022)
  - Total: 320,990
  - Density: 167.4/km^{2} (433.7/sq mi)

Doctor Manuel Belgrano is a department of Jujuy Province, Argentina.
