= Santa Bárbara Department, Jujuy =

Santa Bárbara Departamento Santa Bárbara
- Department
- Interactive map of Santa Bárbara
- Country: Argentina
- Seat: Palma Sola

Area
  - Total: 4,448 km^{2} (1,717 sq mi)

Population (2022)
  - Total: 20,499
  - Density: 4.609/km^{2} (11.94/sq mi)

Santa Bárbara is a department of the province of Jujuy (Argentina).
