= Conhelo =

Coordinates: 36°01′S 64°36′W

- Rural locality and village
- Flag Coat of arms
- Interactive map of Conhelo
- Country: Argentina
- Province: La Pampa

Conhelo is a village and rural locality (municipality) in La Pampa Province in Argentina.
