= San Martín, San Luis =

Coordinates: 32°34′40″S 65°40′30″W

San Martín
- Municipality and village
- Interactive map of San Martín
- Country: Argentina
- Province: San Luis Province
- Time zone: UTC−3 (ART)

San Martín is a village and municipality in San Luis Province in central Argentina.

== Demographics ==
demographic vertical bar chart of between 1895 and 2010
