= Formosa Department =

Formosa Departamento Formosa
- Department
- Interactive map of Formosa
- Country: Argentina
- Seat: Formosa

Area
  - Total: 6,195 km^{2} (2,392 sq mi)

Population (2022)
  - Total: 269,589
  - Density: 43.52/km^{2} (112.7/sq mi)

Formosa is a department of Formosa Province (Argentina).
