= Milagro, La Rioja =

Coordinates: 31°01′S 65°59′W

Milagro
- Municipality and village
- Interactive map of Milagro
- Country: Argentina
- Province: La Rioja Province
- Time zone: UTC−3 (ART)
- Climate: BSh

Milagro is a municipality and village in La Rioja Province in northwestern Argentina.
