= San Martín Department, San Juan =

SAN MARTIN Departamento San Martín
- Department
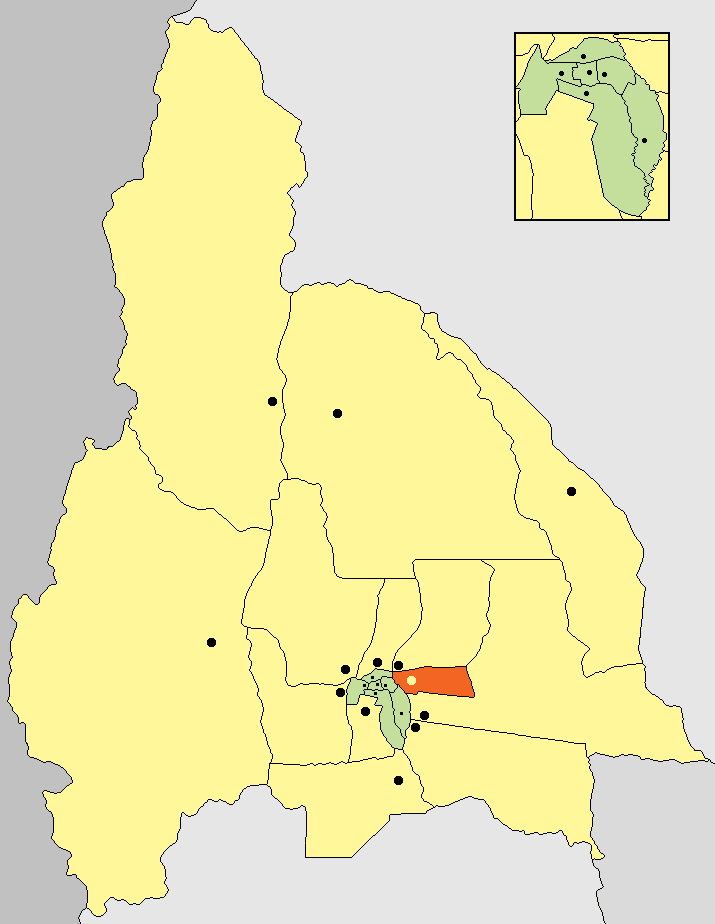
- location of Departamento San Martín in San Juan Province
- Coordinates: 31°30′S 68°17′W
- Country: Argentina
- Established: 19 September 1942
- Seat: San Martín

Government
  - Intendant: Analía Becerra

Area
  - Total: 435 km^{2} (168 sq mi)

Population (2001 census [INDEC])
  - Total: 10,140
  - Density: 23.3/km^{2} (60.4/sq mi)
- Postal Code: 5400
- IFAM: SJU013
- Area Code: 0264
- Patron saint: San Juan Bosco

San Martín is a department in the east of San Juan province (Argentina). It is predominantly a landscape of mountains in the east and significant production of wine.

The department was created on 19 September 1942 from a division of other lands, taking its name from José de San Martín. In 1996, it became the second controlled appellation established in Mendoza alongside the renowned Luján de Cuyo.
