= Coronel Juan Solá =

Coordinates: 23°28′S 62°53′W

- Municipality and town
- Interactive map of Coronel Juan Solá
- Country: Argentina
- Province: Salta Province
- Time zone: UTC−3 (ART)

Coronel Juan Solá is a town and municipality in Salta Province in northwestern Argentina.
