= Juan Bautista Alberdi Department =

Coordinates: 27°35′08″S 65°37′03″W

Juan Bautista Alberdi
- Department
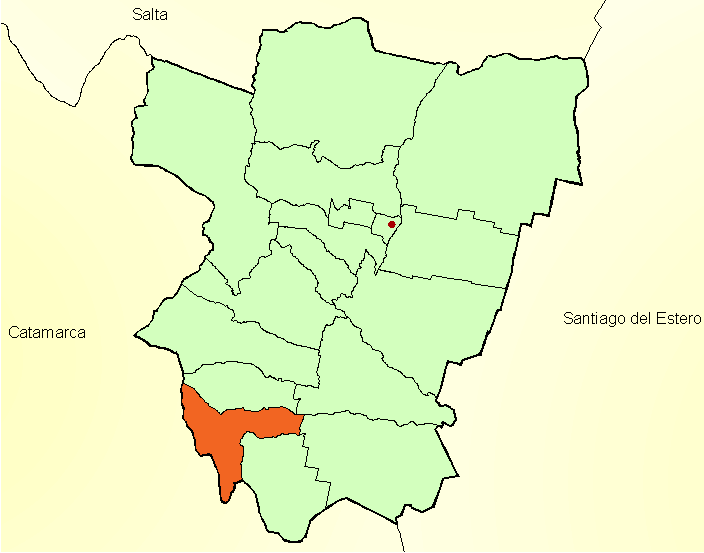
- Location of Juan Bautista Alberdi Department in Tucumán Province.
- Country: Argentina
- Province: Tucumán

Area
  - Total: 730 km^{2} (280 sq mi)

Population (2022)
  - Total: 34,766

Juan Bautista Alberdi Department is a department in Tucumán Province, Argentina. It has a population of 28,206 (2001) and an area of 730 km². The seat of the department is in Juan Bautista Alberdi. The department is named after Juan Bautista Alberdi.

== Municipalities and communes ==
- Escaba
- Juan Bautista Alberdi
- Villa Belgrano
