= Matacos Department =

Matacos Departamento Matacos
- Department
- Interactive map of Matacos
- Country: Argentina
- Seat: Ingeniero Juárez

Area
  - Total: 4,431 km^{2} (1,711 sq mi)

Population (2022)
  - Total: 17,032
  - Density: 3.844/km^{2} (9.955/sq mi)

Matacos is a department of the lake of Formosa (Argentina).
