= Patquía =

Coordinates: 30°03′S 66°53′W

- Municipality and village
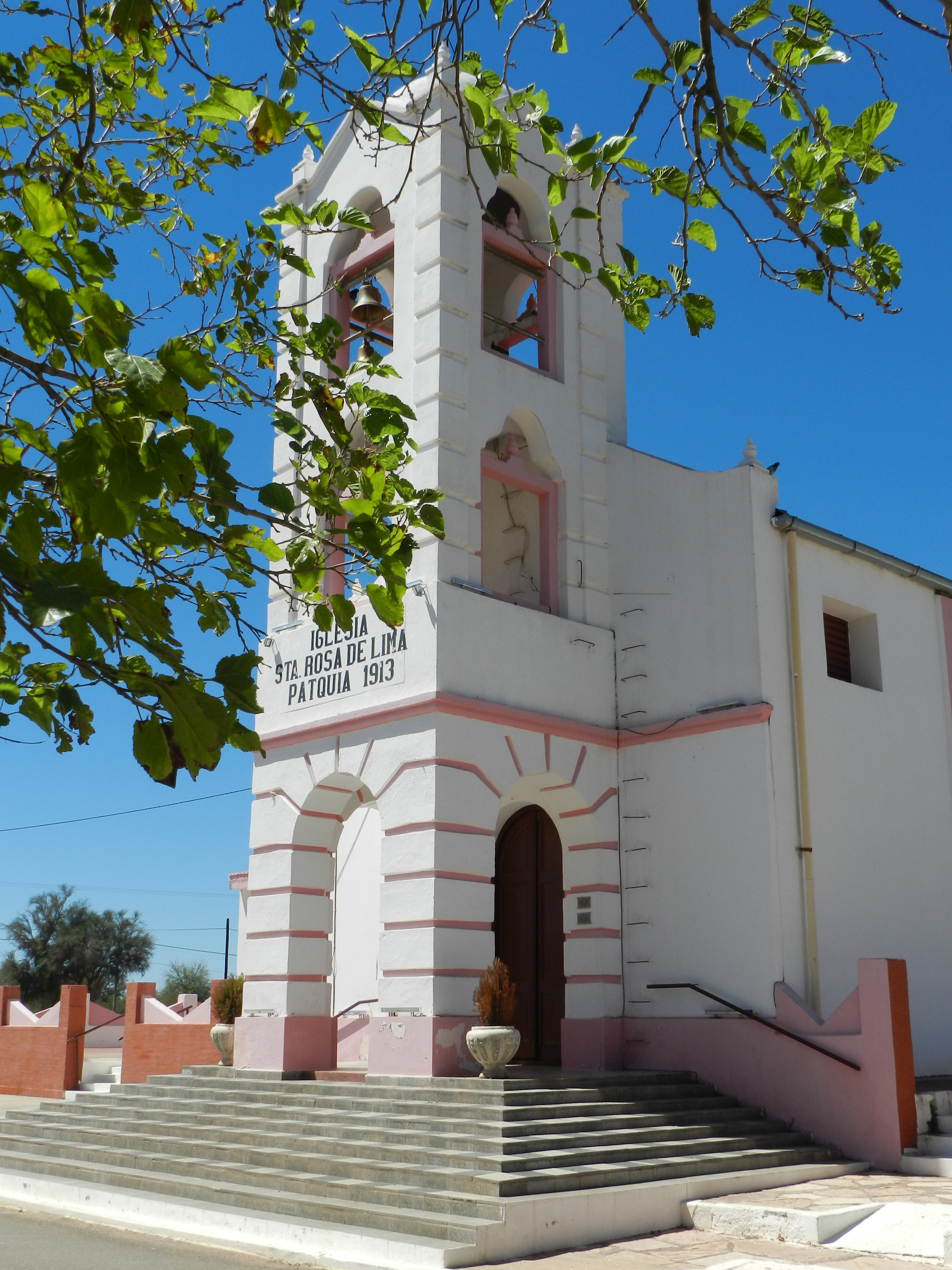
- Iglesia de Patquía
- Interactive map of Patquía
- Country: Argentina
- Province: La Rioja Province
- Time zone: UTC−3 (ART)
- Climate: BWh

Patquía is a municipality and village in La Rioja Province in northwestern Argentina.
