= Ulapes =

Coordinates: 31°35′S 66°15′W

- Municipality and village
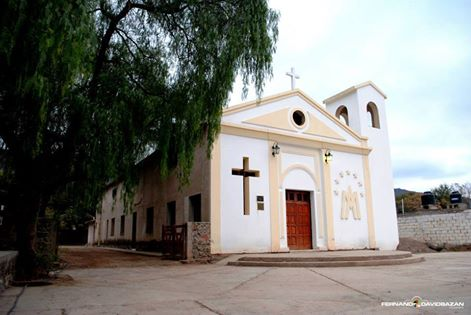
- Our Lady of the Rosary Chapel in Ulapes
- Interactive map of Ulapes
- Country: Argentina
- Province: La Rioja Province

Ulapes is a municipality and village in La Rioja Province in northwestern Argentina.
