= Juan Bautista Alberdi, Tucumán =

Coordinates: 27°35′10″S 65°37′11″W

Juan Bautista Alberdi
- Interactive map of Juan Bautista Alberdi
- Country: Argentina
- Province: Tucumán Province

Government
  - Type: Municipality
  - Intendant: Bruno Romano (PJ)
- Time zone: UTC−3 (ART)

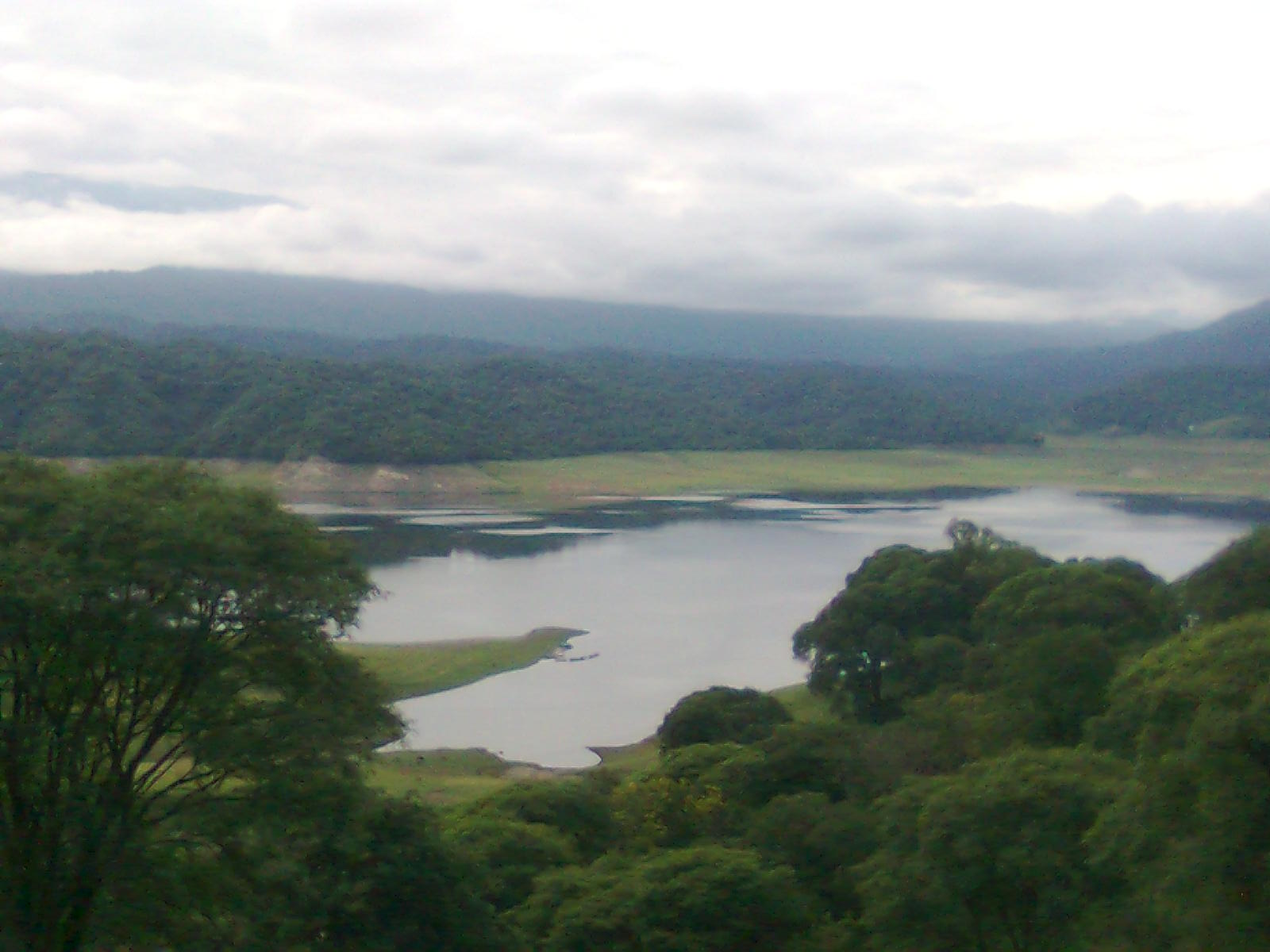
Juan Bautista Alberdi

Juan Bautista Alberdi is a settlement in Tucumán Province in northern Argentina.

== Notable people ==
- Joaquín Correa, footballer
