= Pirané =

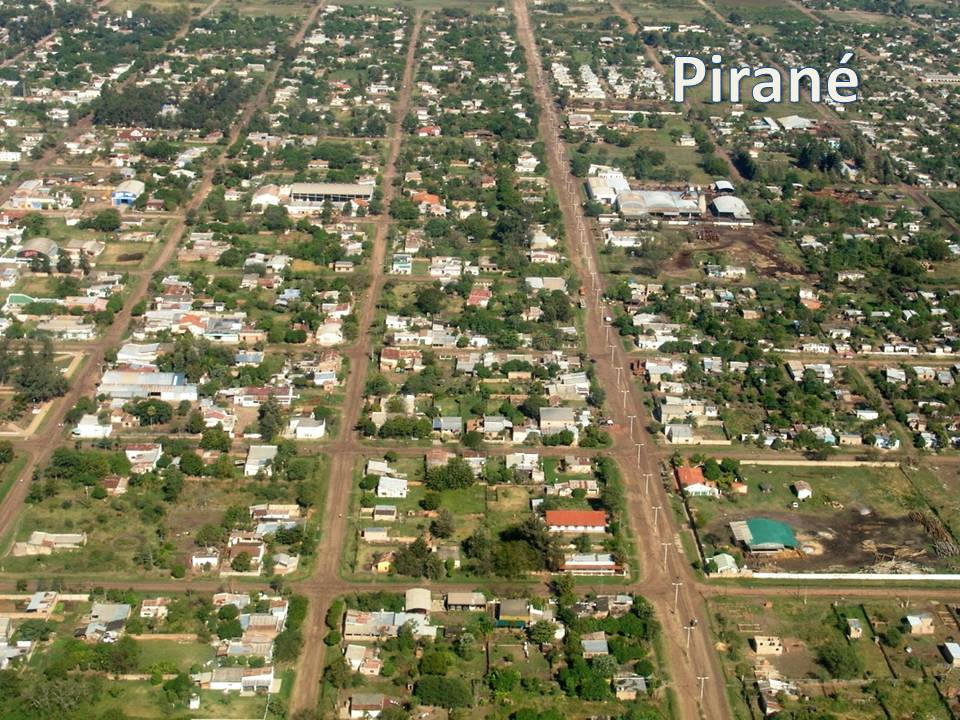

- Location in Argentina
- Coordinates: 25°43′58″S 59°6′36″W
- Country: Argentina
- Province: Formosa Province
- Department: Pirané
- Founded: November 21, 1912

Government
  - Mayor: Mario Norberto Diakovsky

Area
  - Total: 31 sq mi (80 km^{2})
- Elevation: 269 ft (82 m)

Population (2010)
  - Total: 64,556
  - Density: 2,100/sq mi (810/km^{2})
- Time zone: UTC−3 (ART)
- Postal code: 3606
- Area code: 03717
- Climate: Cfa
- Website: pirane.gov.ar

Pirané is a settlement in northern Argentina. It is located in Formosa Province.

== Overview ==
Located on land bordering a number of lagoons, and known by the Tobas as "Puganagay" (green fields), the initial settlement developed with the arrival of the Central Northern Rail line at the site in 1910, and its establishment coincides with the 1912 inaugural of the station. Known accordingly as Estación km. 595 for its distance from the line's western terminus in Embarcación (Salta), the village was designated seat of the newly established county in 1915, and renamed "Pira - ne" in 1919. The Guaraní name, translated as "stinky fish," originated from the sight of parched lagoons during an especially severe drought. The director of the local school, Edmundo Strien, formally named the village "Pirané" in 1926, and the change took effect the following year.

Bounded by the Bermejo River to the south, the town is located in the deep Gran Chaco region, and as such, was limited by the area's dense, thorny dry forests and inhospitable summers. Recurring droughts can alternate with torrential rains, and the area's sandy loess soil is prone to erosion. The surrounding forests are rich in valuable quebracho, pau d'arco, astronium trees, however, and Pirané became a secondary center for forestry in Argentina.

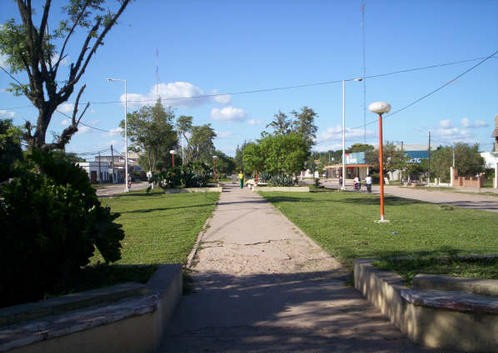
9th of July Boulevard

The extensive wetlands surrounding Pirané give the area a notable biodiversity which includes such as armadillo, heron, iguana, jabiru, jaguar, magpie, coral snake, stork, tapir, toucan, and yacaré among numerous others.

Known in Formosa as the Provincial Capital of Folklore, Pirané is home to lumber, furniture, and food processing industries. The town is 109 km (68 mi) west of Formosa, the provincial capital, and is linked to the latter via National Route 81.
