= Trenel =

Coordinates: 35°42′S 64°08′W

- Town
- Interactive map of Trenel
- Country: Argentina
- Province: La Pampa
- Time zone: UTC−3 (ART)

Trenel is a town located in the north west of La Pampa Province in Argentina.
