= El Carmen, Jujuy =

Coordinates: 24°23′15″S 65°15′33″W

El Carmen (Jujuy)
- Municipality and town
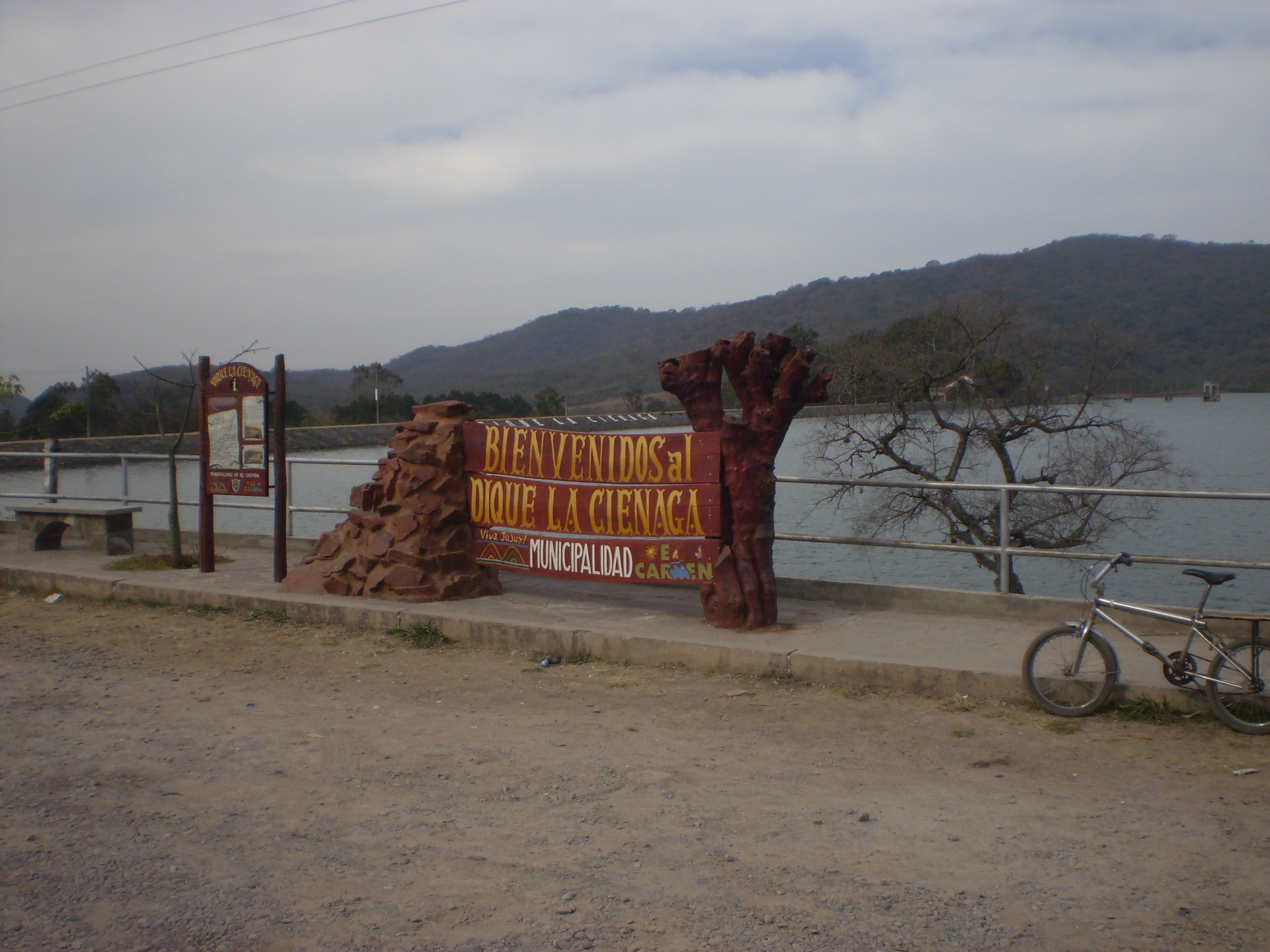
- Interactive map of El Carmen (Jujuy)
- Country: Argentina
- Province: Jujuy Province
- Time zone: UTC−3 (ART)

El Carmen (Jujuy) is a town and municipality in Jujuy Province in Argentina.
