= San Francisco de Laishi =

Coordinates: 26°14′S 58°38′W

San Francisco de Laishí
- Interactive map of San Francisco de Laishí
- Country: Argentina
- Province: Formosa Province
- Time zone: UTC−3 (ART)
- Climate: Cfa

San Francisco de Laishí is a settlement in northern Argentina. It is located in Formosa Province.
