= Bermejo Department, Formosa =

Bermejo Departamento Bermejo
- Department
- Interactive map of Bermejo
- Country: Argentina
- Seat: Laguna Yema

Area
  - Total: 12,850 km^{2} (4,960 sq mi)

Population (2022)
  - Total: 15,644
  - Density: 1.217/km^{2} (3.153/sq mi)

Bermejo is a department of the province of Formosa (Argentina).
