= La Cocha Department =

Coordinates: 27°46′16″S 65°35′08″W

La Cocha
- Department
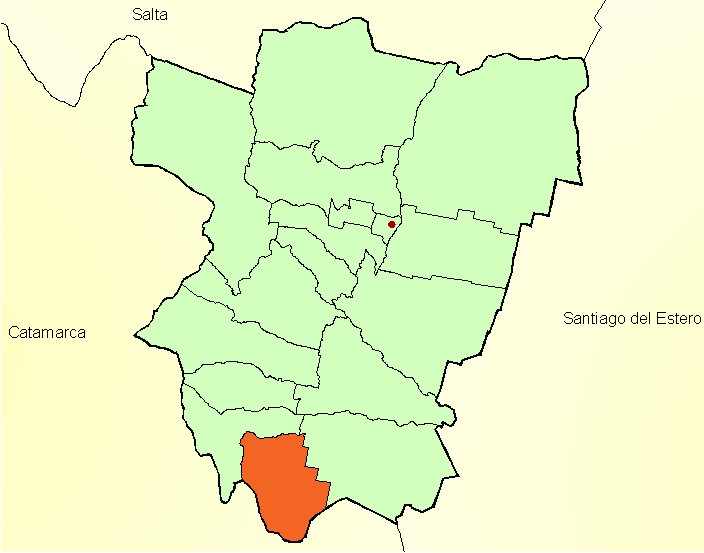
- Location of La Cocha Department in Tucumán Province.
- Country: Argentina
- Province: Tucumán

Area
  - Total: 917 km^{2} (354 sq mi)

Population (2022)
  - Total: 21,218

La Cocha Department is a department in Tucumán Province, Argentina. It has a population of 17,683 (2001) and an area of 917 km². The seat of the department is in La Cocha.

== Municipalities and communes ==
- El Sacrificio
- Huasa Pampa
- La Cocha
- Rumi Punco
- San Ignacio
- San José de la Cocha
- Yánima

== Notes ==
This article includes content from the Spanish Wikipedia article Departamento La Cocha.
