= Palma Sola, Jujuy =

Coordinates: 23°59′00″S 64°18′36″W

Palma Sola
- Municipality and town
- Interactive map of Palma Sola
- Country: Argentina
- Province: Jujuy Province
- Time zone: UTC−3 (ART)

Palma Sola is a town and municipality in Jujuy Province in Argentina.
