= San Javier, Misiones =

San Javier
- Municipality and village
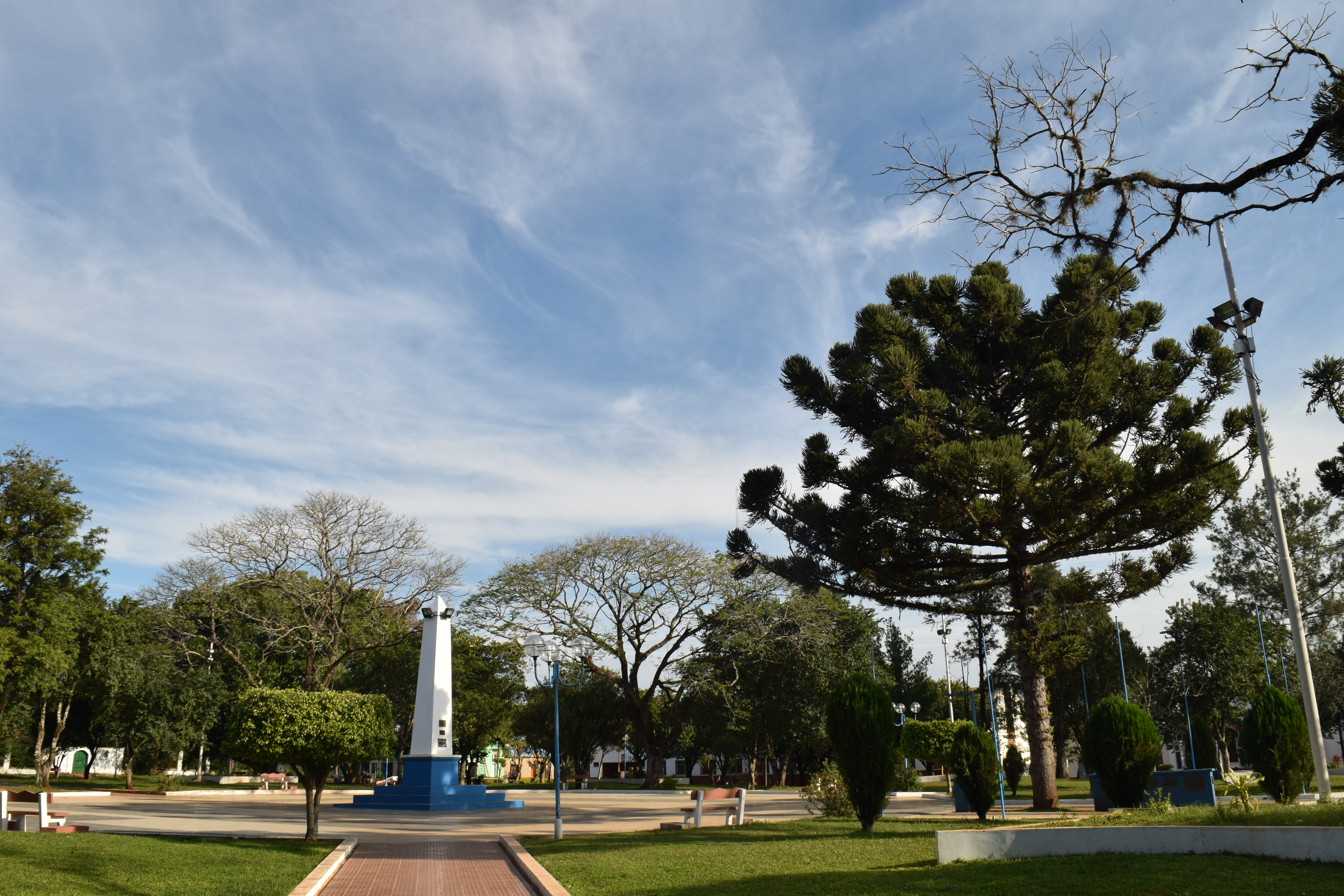

- Location within Misiones Province Location within Argentina
- Country: Argentina
- Province: Misiones Province
- Time zone: UTC−3 (ART)

San Javier is a village and municipality in Misiones Province in north-eastern Argentina.

== Gallery ==
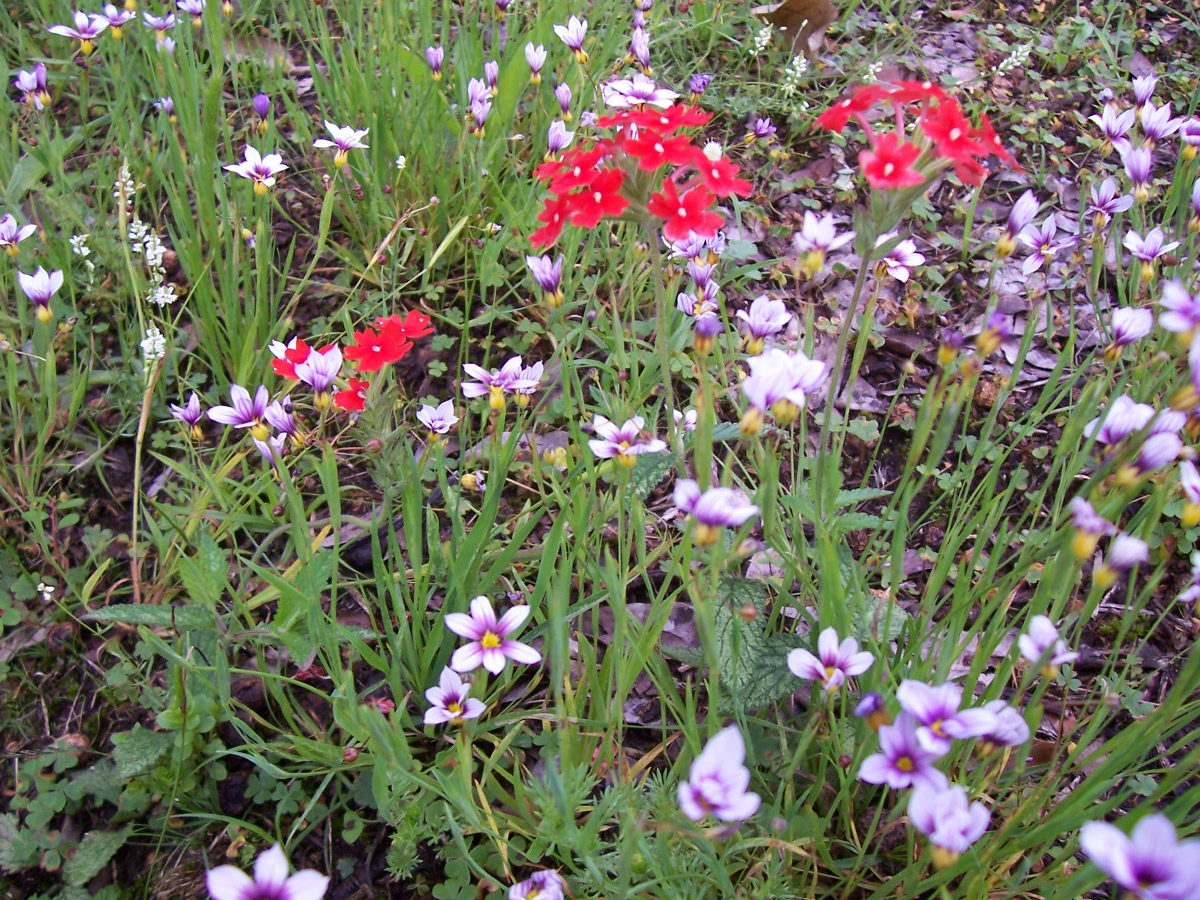
Flowers in the Monk Hill

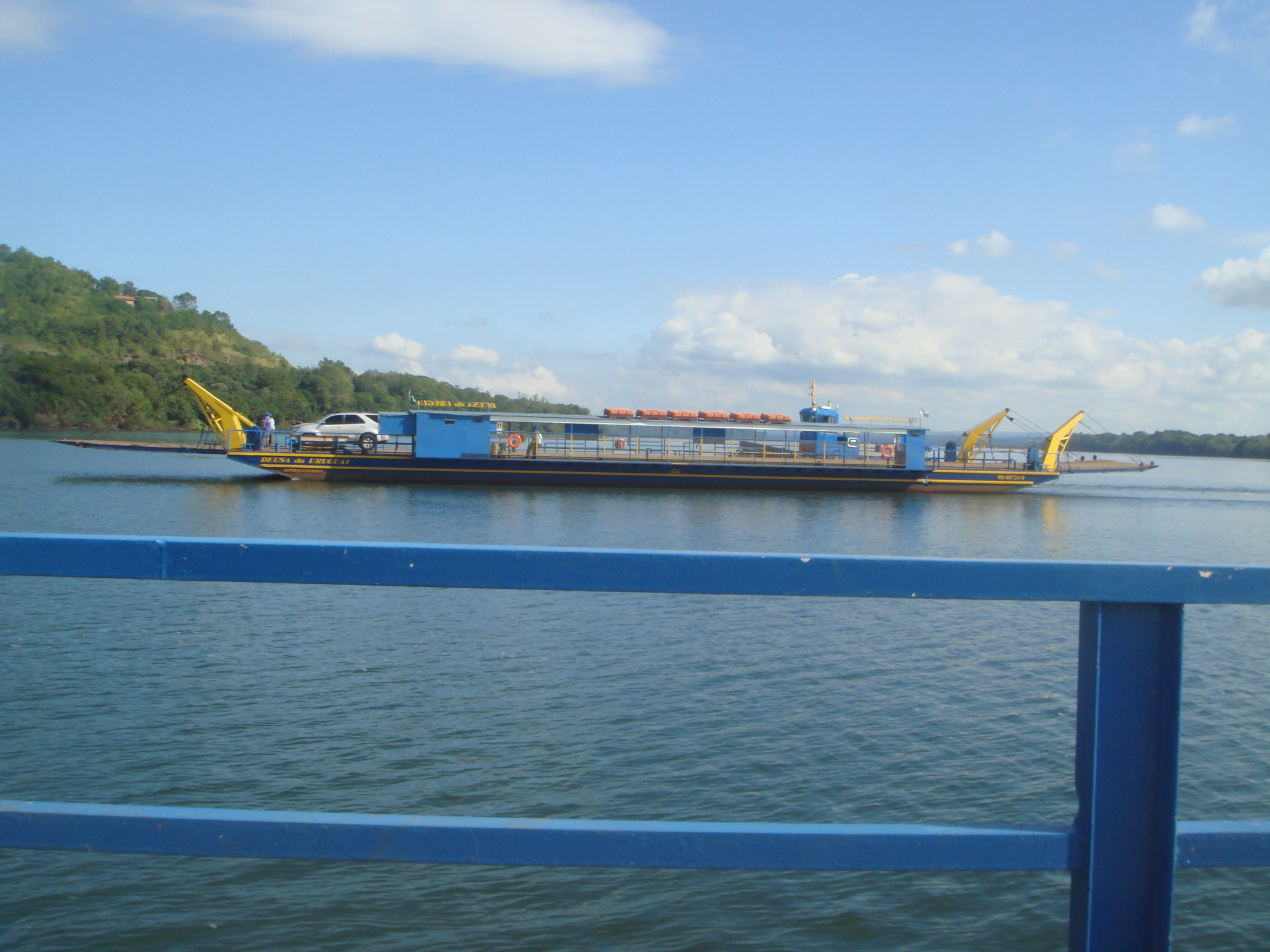
Ferry crossing Uruguay River in San Javier, April 2012
