= Victorica =

Coordinates: 36°13′S 65°27′W

- Town
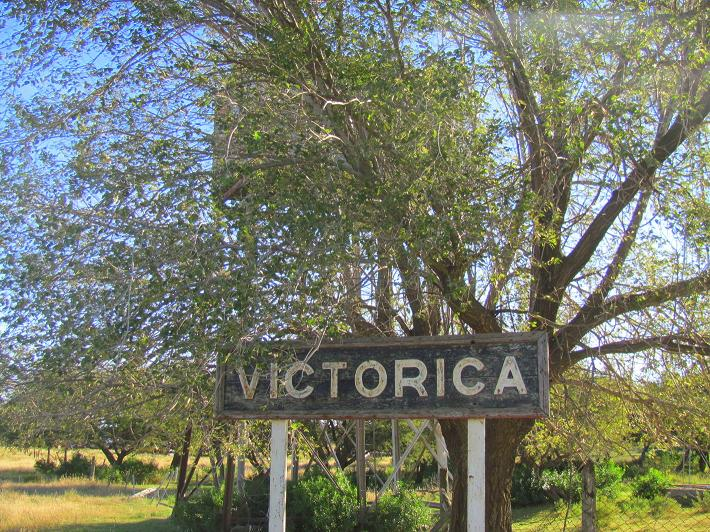
- Interactive map of Victorica
- Country: Argentina
- Province: La Pampa
- Time zone: UTC−3 (ART)

Victorica is a town in La Pampa Province in Argentina.
