= Simoca Department =

Simoca
- Department
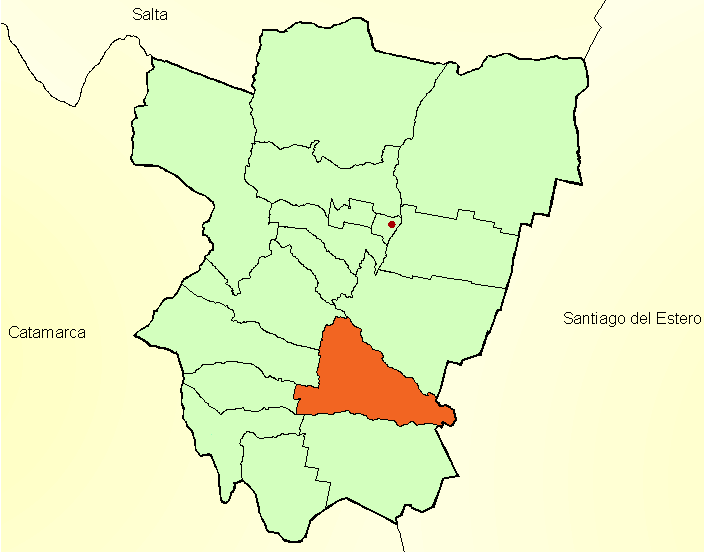
- Location of Simoca Department in Tucumán Province.
- Coordinates: 27°15′47″S 65°21′28″W
- Country: Argentina
- Province: Tucumán
- Seat: Simoca

Area
  - Total: 1,261 km^{2} (487 sq mi)

Population (2022)
  - Total: 36,973

Simoca Department is a department in Tucumán Province, Argentina. It has a population of 29,932 (2001) and an area of 1,261 km^{2}. The seat of the department is in Simoca.

== Municipalities and communes ==
- Atahona
- Buena Vista
- Ciudacita
- Manuela Pedraza
- Monteagudo
- Pampa Mayo
- Río Chico y Nueva Trinidad
- San Pedro y San Antonio
- Santa Cruz y La Tuna
- Simoca
- Villa Chigligasta
- Yerba Buena

== Notes ==
This article includes content from the Spanish Wikipedia article Departamento Simoca.
