= Río Chico Department, Tucumán =

Río Chico
- Department
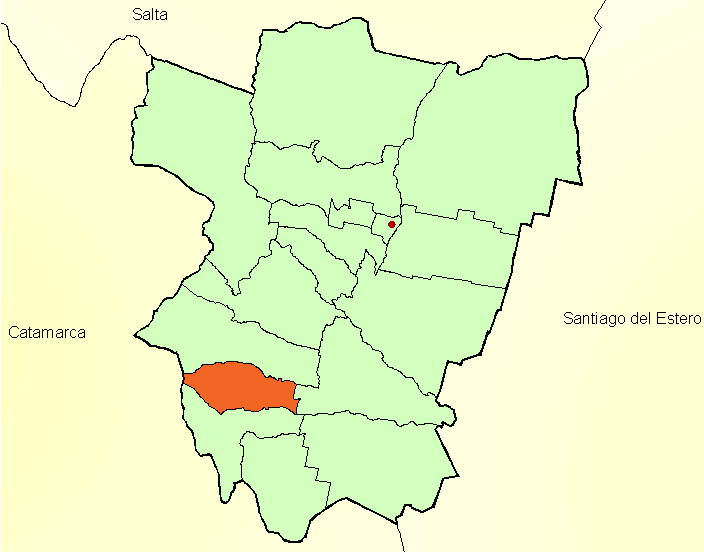
- Location of Río Chico Department in Tucumán Province.
- Country: Argentina
- Province: Tucumán
- Seat: Aguilares

Area
  - Total: 585 km^{2} (226 sq mi)

Population (2022)
  - Total: 64,962

Río Chico Department is a department in Tucumán Province, Argentina. It has a population of 52,925 (2001) and an area of 585 km². The seat of the department is in Aguilares.

== Municipalities and communes ==
- Aguilares
- El Polear
- Los Sarmientos y La Tipa
- Monte Bello
- Santa Ana

== Notes ==
This article includes content from the Spanish Wikipedia article Departamento Río Chico (Tucumán).
