= Comandante Fontana =

Coordinates: 25°20′S 59°41′W

- Interactive map of Comandante Fontana
- Country: Argentina
- Province: Formosa Province
- Time zone: UTC−3 (ART)
- Climate: Cfa

Comandante Fontana is a settlement in northern Argentina. It is located in Formosa Province.
