= Olta, Argentina =

Coordinates: 30°37′S 66°16′W

Olta
- Municipality and village
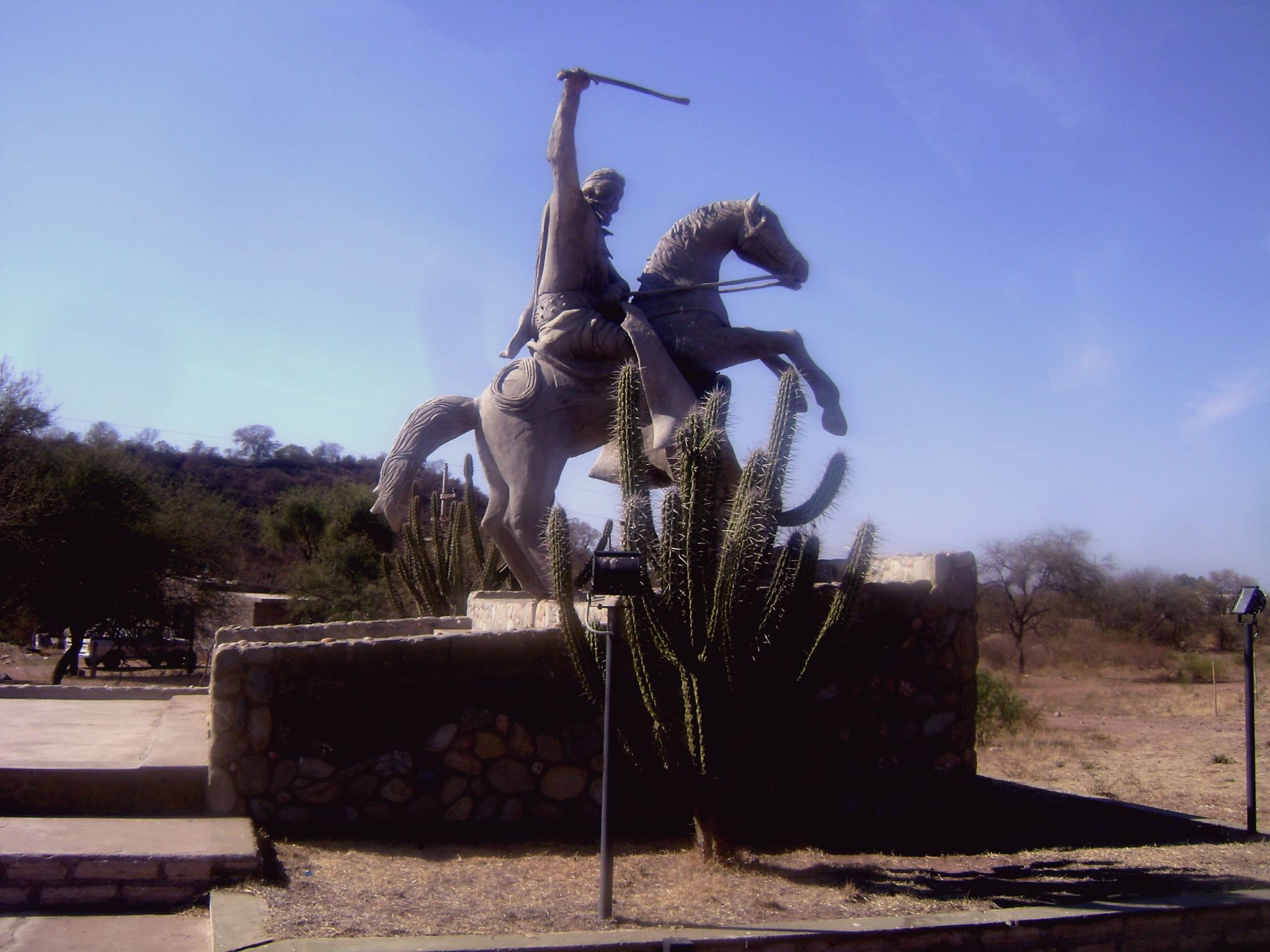
- Monument of Chacho Peñaloza, at the north entrance of Olta
- Interactive map of Olta
- Country: Argentina
- Province: La Rioja Province
- Time zone: UTC−3 (ART)
- Climate: BSh

Olta is a municipality and village in La Rioja Province in northwestern Argentina.
