= El Espinillo, Formosa =

Coordinates: 24°58′S 58°34′W

El Espinillo (Formosa)
- Interactive map of El Espinillo (Formosa)
- Country: Argentina
- Province: Formosa Province
- Time zone: UTC−3 (ART)

El Espinillo is a settlement in Formosa Province in northern Argentina. It's the exact antipode of Taipei, the capital of Taiwan.
