= Laguna Yema, Formosa =

Laguna Yema (Formosa)
- Location within Argentina
- Coordinates: 24°15′15″S 61°14′47″W
- Country: Argentina
- Province: Formosa Province
- Climate: BSh

Laguna Yema (Formosa) is a settlement in northern Argentina. It is located in Formosa Province.
