= Ingeniero Juárez =

Coordinates: 23°54′S 61°51′W

- Interactive map of Ingeniero Juárez
- Demonym: Juarense
- Country: Argentina
- Province: Formosa Province
- Time zone: UTC−3 (ART)
- Climate: BSh

Ingeniero Juárez is a settlement in northern Argentina. It is located in the western of Formosa Province.
