= Provincial Route 10 (La Pampa) =

Highway in La Pampa, Argentina

Provincial Route 10
- Ruta provincial 10
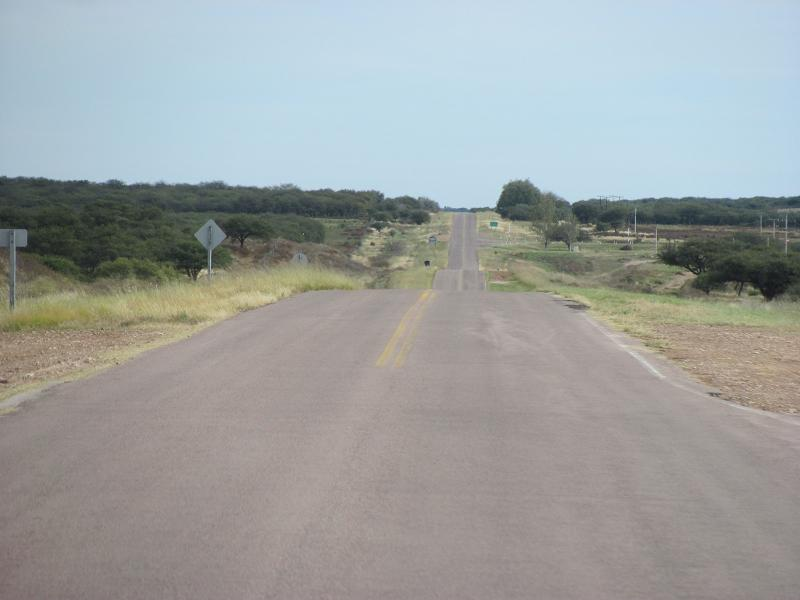

Route information
- Length: 440 km (270 mi)
- Existed: 1979–present

Major junctions
- From: Border with the Buenos Aires Province
- To: Border with the Mendoza Province

Location
- Country: Argentina

Highway system
- Highways in Argentina

Provincial Route 10 is a highway located in the Argentine province of La Pampa. Its total route is 440 km (273 mi) completely of asphalt to Santa Isabel.

== Route ==
Its eastern end is the border with the Province of Buenos Aires at meridian 63°23'W. When crossing the FCDFS tracks in the vicinity of the city of Miguel Cané, it passes through the access to Colonia Barón. It has a cut of 5 km (3 mi) when it connects with National Route 35. It runs west again from the access to the city of Winifreda.

It is the main access road to the cities of Victorica, Telén and Santa Isabel, until its junction with National Route 143.

It resurfaces in Algarrobo del Águila to the west. It leads to the town of La Humada, ending at the border with the province of Mendoza where it continues under the name of Provincial Route 190.

== History ==
From 1935 to 1979, the section between Santa Isabel and Provincial Route 11 belonged to National Route 143.
