= Caleu Caleu Department =

Coordinates: 38°58′56″S 64°05′26″W

Caleu Caleu Department Departamento Caleu Caleu
- Country: Argentina
- Province: La Pampa
- Capital: La Adela

Area
  - Total: 9,078 km^{2} (3,505 sq mi)

Population (2022)
  - Total: 2,611
  - Density: 0.2876/km^{2} (0.7449/sq mi)

Caleu Caleu Department (Spanish: Departamento Caleu Caleu) is a department in southeastern La Pampa Province, Argentina. The name means gull in the Mapuche language. To the north, it borders Hucal Department, to the east, Buenos Aires Province, to the south, Río Negro Province, and to the west, Lihuel Cahel Department.

Many of the borders of the municipalities in the region do not align with those of the departments. Caleu Caleu includes part (including the capital) of the municipality of La Adela and part of the municipalities of Bernasconi, General San Martín, and Jacinto Aráuz, which have their capitals in another department.

Anzoategui is also in the department.
