= Abramo =

Abramo may refer to:

- Abramo, La Pampa, village and rural locality in Argentina
- Abramo (given name)
- Abramo (surname)

== See also ==
- Abrama, town in Gujarat, India
