= Agua Poca =

Volcano in La Pampa, Argentina

- Location within South America

Highest point
- Coordinates: 37°1′S 68°7′W

Geography
- Location: Argentina, part of South America

Geology
- Rock age: Pleistocene
- Mountain type: Volcano
- Last eruption: 600,000 years ago.

Agua Poca is a monogenetic volcano in the Puelén Department of Argentina. The volcano has the form of a 280 by 650 metres (920 ft × 2,130 ft) wide 70 metres (230 ft) high cinder cone and has been active in the Pleistocene.

== Accessibility ==
The volcano is in the Puelén Department, 60 kilometres (37 mi) southwest of the eponymous town, and it can be reached from the provincial routes Nr 20 and Nr 143 . Unpaved roads lead to the volcano itself.

== Geography ==
Agua Poca lies in the western La Pampa Province, close to the boundary with Mendoza province. Two other volcanoes, Del Nido and Escorial/Amarillo are nearby. The volcano consists of two elevations, which may have formed over an eruption fissure. It has a topographic prominence of 70 metres (230 ft) over the surrounding terrain and is a degraded cone. The structure is formed by layers of variably welded volcanic deposits.

== Geology ==
The volcanism in the Agua Poca area began as fissure eruptions that released large amounts of liquid lavas, forming Agua Poca, El Escorial, Payun Matru and other volcanoes. The volcano is located 530 kilometres (330 mi) east of the Peru–Chile Trench, in the back-arc region.

Agua Poca has erupted basalt lava. Bisceglia (1977) assumed that Agua Poca, together with the neighbouring volcanoes Del Nido and Escorial/Amarillo, is the origin of the El Puente basalt formation. Later, Linares et al (1980) assumed that these basalts originated in volcanoes of the Mendoza province with little input from these three volcanoes. The volcano itself has an easily recognizable crater, but part of the volcano's flanks has been subject to gully erosion. The crater is 50 metres (160 ft) deep below the crater rim, and the cone itself has dimensions of 650 metres (2,130 ft)-280 metres (920 ft). The cone is constructed from alternating layers of cinder and spatter and contains ultramafic xenoliths. There are two subsidiary structures, Cherro Chico and Loma Sur of small dimensions. Chemically, the lavas of Agua Poca are intra-plate alkali basalts, with some lavas transitioning in tholeiite.

Various geologists have attributed varying ages to these volcanoes, ranging from Pliocene to Holocene. The volcano was active in the Pleistocene, with K-Ar dating indicating an age of 0.6±1 Ma. There have been numerous phases of volcanic activity in the region until recent times, with Agua Poca belonging to the Puente Group given stratigraphic and radiometric data. Activity was strombolian in nature with the formation of Pele's tears and lava bombs and was likely monogenetic in nature. A fault system running through the edifice possibly controlled the activity of this volcano.

The "Cueva de Halada" lava tube is located 5 kilometres (3.1 mi) away from Agua Poca. Given the small magma output of this volcano, it's likely the tunnel is unrelated to Agua Poca.
