= Ranquel Ulmanate =

18th-19th century South American indigenous confederation

Ranquel Ulmanate Ülmen
- c. 18th century–1879
- Flag

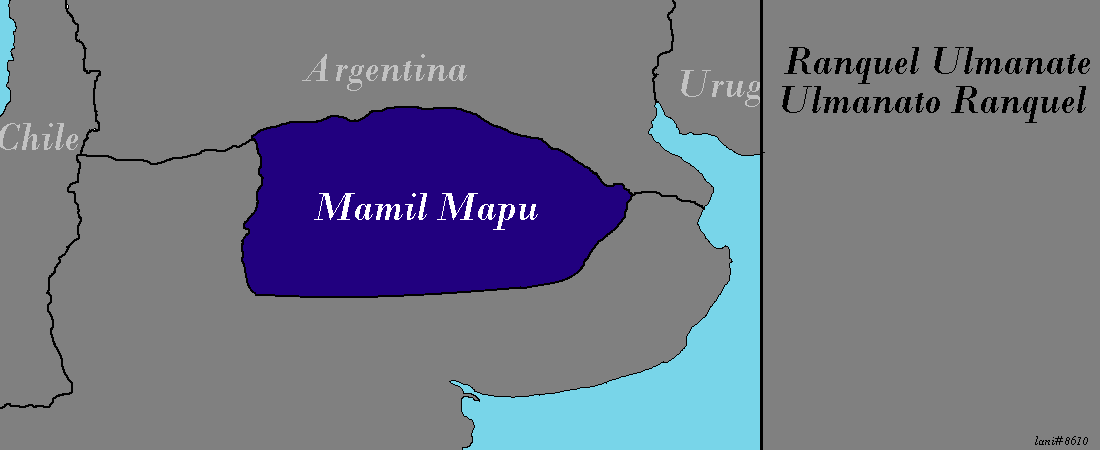
- Approximate territory of the Ranquel Ulmanate
- Capital: Leubucó
- Common languages: Mapudungún
- Demonym: Ranquel
- Government: Tribal confederation
- History
  - Established: c. 18th century
  - Conquest of the Desert: 1879

The Ranquel Ulmanate (from Mapudungún: ülmen, which translates as rich or powerful man) was a confederation of indigenous peoples of the Pampas region of Argentina. From the last decades of the 18th century until 1879 they maintained their independence from the Spanish colonial power, and from its Argentine successor state, under the unified command of the úlmenes (or lonco che). Its main headquarters was in Leubucó in the current La Pampa province.

Its territory covered the area between the Chadileuvú River (or Desaguadero-Salado) to the west, the Salinas Grandes to the south and the central-west of what is now the interior of the Buenos Aires Province to the east. The northern limit was the approximate line that passed through the places of Leplep, Agustinillo, Monte de la Vieja and the Cuero lagoon, although at some times it reached the Quinto River and perhaps also the Cuarto.
