= Anzoátegui (disambiguation) =

Anzoátegui is one of the 23 component states of Venezuela,

Anzoátegui may also refer to:

- Anzoategui, La Pampa, Argentina
- Anzoátegui, Tolima, Colombia
- Anzoátegui Parish, Morán Municipality, Lara State, Venezuela
- Anzoátegui Municipality, Cojedes State, Venezuela
- Anzoátegui, José Antonio Venezuelan Brigadier General, Independence hero

== People with the surname ==
- José Antonio Anzoátegui
