= Ataliva Roca =

Place in La Pampa Province, Argentina

Coordinates: 37°01′S 64°17′W

- Rural locality and village
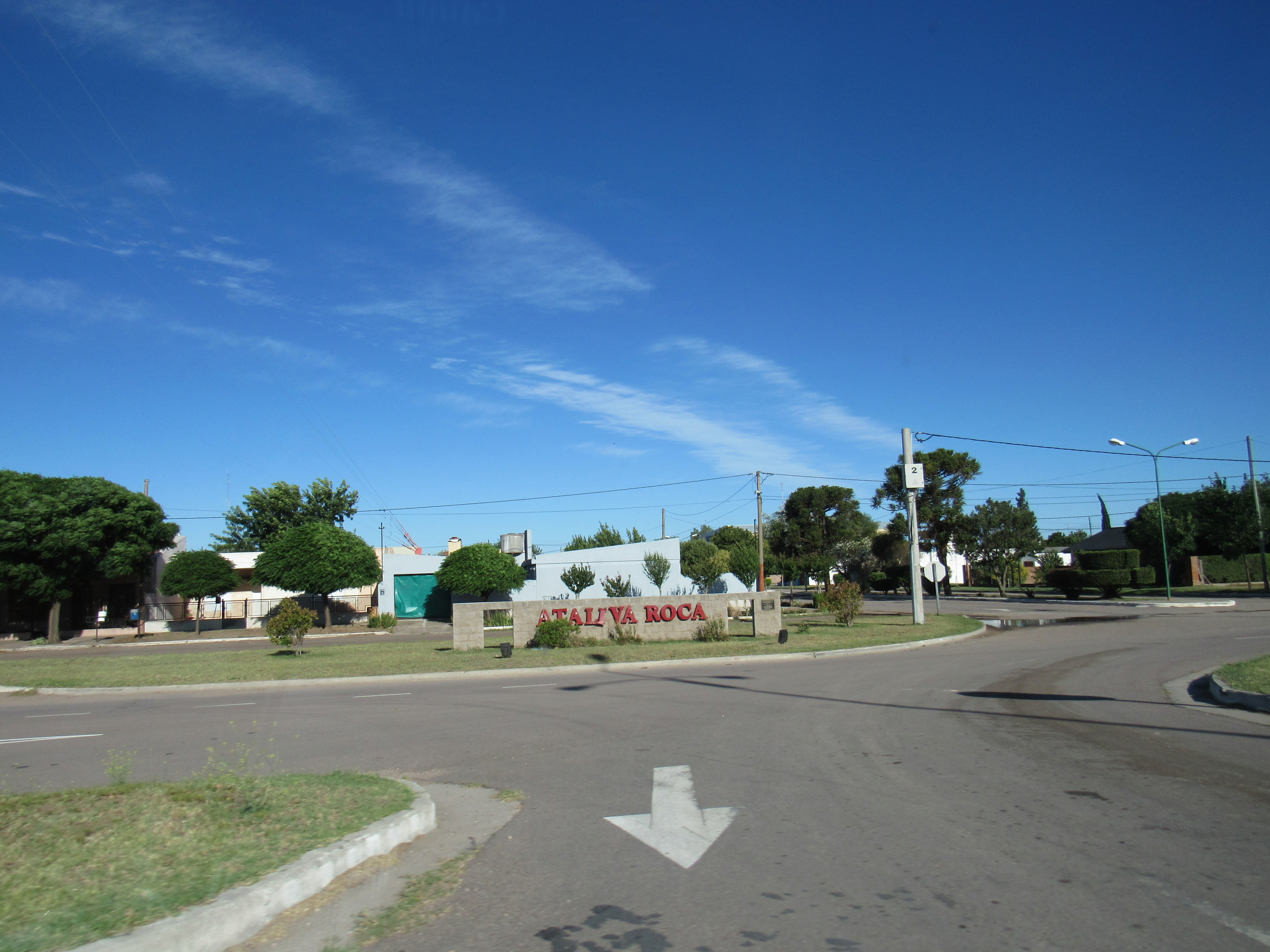
- Interactive map of Ataliva Roca
- Country: Argentina
- Province: La Pampa Province
- Time zone: UTC−3 (ART)

Ataliva Roca is a village and rural locality (municipality) in the department of Utracán in La Pampa Province in Argentina. Founded on September 20, 1902, it is 45 km (28 miles) South of Santa Rosa, the capital city of La Pampa. It is connected to Santa Rosa by RN 35 highway. According to the 2001 Argentine Census, its population is 557, a 14.4% increase from the 1991 census.
