= Dora Barrancos =

Argentine sociologist (born 1940)

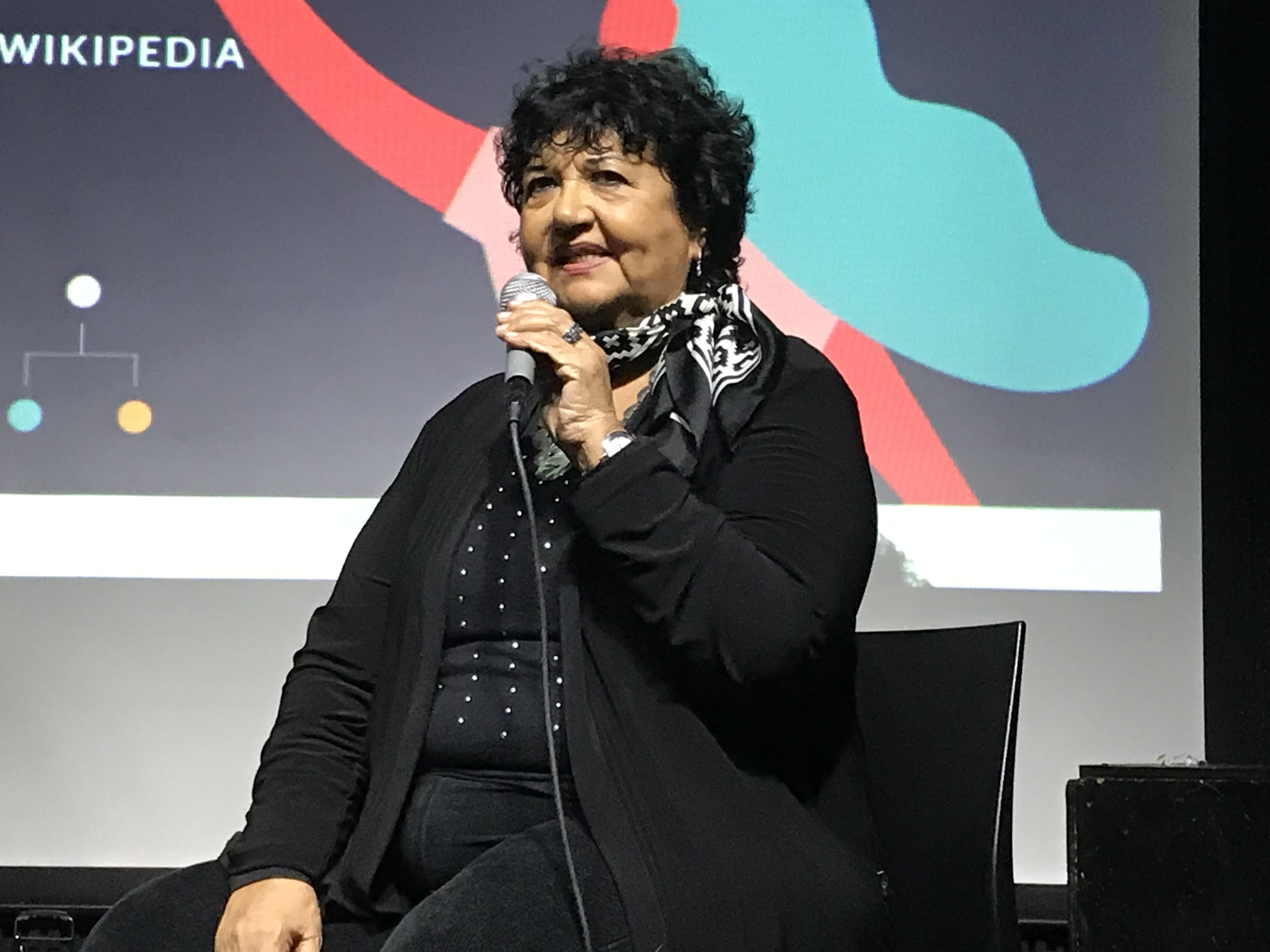

Legislator of the City of Buenos Aires
- In office 7 August 1994 – 7 August 1998

Personal details
- Born: Dora Beatriz Barrancos; 15 August 1940 (age 86) Jacinto Aráuz, La Pampa, Argentina
- Party: Broad Front
- Other political affiliations: Frente de Todos
- Education: University of Buenos Aires
- Occupation: Sociologist, politician

Dora Beatriz Barrancos (born 15 August 1940) is an Argentine researcher, sociologist, historian, feminist, and politician.

She was part of the National Scientific and Technical Research Council (CONICET) board of directors until May 2019, when she resigned in protest over a budget reduction that severely affected the institution.

== Biography ==
Dora Barrancos was born in Jacinto Aráuz on 15 August 1940. Her father was a teacher and school director, and her mother – surnamed Bonjour – was a housewife. The family moved from La Pampa Province to Buenos Aires Province, and Dora attended high school in the town of Laprida.

In September 1955, a coup d'état took place, overthrowing the constitutional government of Juan Perón and beginning a military dictatorship, the self-styled Revolución Libertadora. In 1957, Dora Barrancos enrolled in the Law School of the University of Buenos Aires (UBA). In those years she was active in "avant-garde socialism". However, she ended up approaching the Justicialist Party, and joined the Peronist Youth.

In 1960, her father died, and she had to start working as a teacher to support her family. She abandoned the study of law and switched to sociology at UBA's Faculty of Philosophy and Letters. In 1968, she graduated with a licentiate in sociology.

After the coup d'état of 24 March 1976 overthrew the constitutional government of Isabel Perón, Barrancos immediately lost her job as a sociologist at the Comprehensive Medical Attention Program (PAMI). Under the civil-military dictatorship, she received death threats, and several of her classmates and fellow teachers began to "disappear". However, she could not go into exile because she had two very young daughters from her first marriage, and she had to wait for a judge's decision to give her permission to travel with the girls.

In May 1977, a friend told her that a Peronist Youth colleague had been kidnapped for about three days, tortured, and subjected to mock executions. When she was released, she managed to send a warning that she had explicitly mentioned Barrancos in the interrogation. That day, Barrancos and her second husband Eduardo decided to leave the girls in their father's care and escape to Belo Horizonte, Brazil, where he had acquaintances. There, Barrancos came into contact with the feminist movement and other social movements that were positioned against the dictatorship. She also had her first contact with the French philosopher Michel Foucault, and entered the field of historiography.

In 1984, she returned to Argentina and resigned from the Justicialist Party, considering Peronism a conservative movement - she had been a member of the Peronist Youth, the most left-wing of the Peronist factions. She began to study the political history of Argentina, publishing several studies on socialist and anarchist movements.

In 1985, she presented her thesis to obtain a master's degree in education at the Faculty of Education of the Federal University of Minas Gerais, in Belo Horizonte.

In 1986, she obtained the position of researcher at CONICET, and was later promoted to principal researcher.

In 1993, she earned a doctorate in history at the Institute of Philosophy and Human Sciences of the University of Campinas.

In 1994, when the first Buenos Aires City Legislature was created (after Buenos Aires ceased to be a municipality and became an autonomous city), Barrancos was elected as a member for the Broad Front.

She became a full professor of the Latin American Social History Chair at UBA's Faculty of Social Sciences. She coordinated the master's degree program in social and cultural studies at the National University of La Pampa's Faculty of Humanities.

From 2000 to 2009, she was the director of the Interdisciplinary Institute for Gender Studies (IIEGE) at UBA's Faculty of Philosophy and Letters.

She currently directs the master's and doctorate programs in social sciences and humanities at the National University of Quilmes. In May 2010 – by a vote of the scientific community – she became director of CONICET on behalf of social and human sciences. She resigned in May 2019 in protest of a budget reduction affecting the institution.

In 2016, she received the Konex Award Diploma of Merit in the Humanities.

As a historian, Dora Barrancos has dedicated herself to studying the development of feminism in Argentina, the social movements of the early 20th century, the revolutions carried out by women, socialist and anarchist movements, and the role of education in Argentine history.

Dora Barrancos at the Argentine Gender, Science, and Technology Network (RAGCYT)

During 2018, she participated in debates about the legalization of abortion and expressed support for the bill in Senate hearings. She previously supported the Gender Identity Law, and considered it one of the most progressive in the world. In the 2010s she had a rapprochement with Peronism after a series of civilist measures: the adoption law, the legitimacy of the absolute equality of legitimate and illegitimate children, as well as divorce. Barrancos believes "that liberal governments did not deal with this and instead Peronism advances on civil rights."

In the 2019 general election, she was a candidate to the Argentine Senate in the Frente de Todos coalition list, but ultimately was not elected.

== Personal life ==
Dora Barrancos is married and has three daughters. Considered a feminist, she has worked towards the empowerment of women, favoring policies promoted by Lázaro Cardenas in Mexico, Rafael Correa in Ecuador, and Raúl Alfonsín and Cristina Férnandez in Argentina. She has criticized political figures such as Gabriela Michetti and María Eugenia Vidal for their conservative positions, being critical of the scant participation of women in radicalism. She has also rehabilitated the historical figures of Eva and Juan Perón for legislating women's suffrage and rights, as well as the Eva Perón Foundation's actions on behalf of women and children. She has expressed support for abortion rights and the Me Too movement.

== Books ==
- Anarquismo, educación y costumbres en la Argentina de principio de siglo (1st ed.). Contrapunto. 1990. ISBN 978-950-47-0024-1.
- Educación, cultura y trabajadores 1890–1930 (1st ed.). Centro Editor de América Latina. 1991. ISBN 978-950-25-0083-6.
- Historia y género (1st ed.). Centro Editor de América Latina. 1993. ISBN 978-950-25-2433-7.
- La escena iluminada. Ciencias para trabajadores (1890-1930) (1st ed.). Plus Ultra. 1996. ISBN 978-950-21-1250-3.
- Inclusión/exclusión. Historia con mujeres (1st ed.). Fondo de Cultura Económica. 2002. ISBN 978-950-557-526-8.
- Las mujeres y sus luchas en la historia Argentina (1st ed.). Ministerio de Defensa. 2006. ISBN 978-987-97497-5-3.
- Formas de historia cultural (1st ed.). Prometeo Libros. 2007. ISBN 978-987-574-168-3. Co-author with Graciela Batticuore, José Emilio Burucúa, Mariano Ben Plotkin, Hilda Sábato, and others.
- Monstruos y monstruosidades (1st ed.). Universidad de Buenos Aires. 2007. ISBN 978-950-29-1002-4. Compiler.
- Mujeres en la sociedad argentina. Una historia de cinco siglos (1st ed.). Sudamericana. 2007. ISBN 978-950-07-2880-5.
- Mujeres, entre la casa y la plaza (1st ed.). Sudamericana. 2008. ISBN 978-950-07-2967-3.
- Jornada de Conferencias Los derechos de las mujeres en la primera mitad del siglo XX (1st ed.). Universidad Nacional de La Plata. ISBN 978-950-34-0612-0. Co-author with Verónica Giordano, Marisa Adriana Miranda, Silvana Palermo, Graciela Amalia Queirolo, Karina Inés Ramacciotti, and Adriana María Valobra.
- Evita, una mirada actual de una apasionada eterna (1st ed.). Buenos Aires City Legislature. 2012. ISBN 978-987-26649-1-6. Co-author.
- Moralidades y comportamientos sexuales: Argentina, 1880-2011 (1st ed.). Biblos. 2014. ISBN 978-987-691-299-0.
- Historia Mínima de los Feminismos en América Latina (1st ed.). El Colegio de Mexico. 2020. ISBN 978-607-564-217-8.

== Awards and recognitions ==
- 2014: Declared an Illustrious Citizen of Buenos Aires
- 2016: Konex Award Diploma of Merit in Gender Studies
- 2018: Senator Domingo Faustino Sarmiento Honor from the Argentine Senate
- 2019: Doctor honoris causa from the National University of Rosario
