= Alta Italia =

- Rural locality and village
- Interactive map of Alta Italia
- Coordinates: 35°0′22″S 64°0′07.60″W
- Country: Argentina
- Province: La Pampa Province
- Department: Realicó Department
- Municipality: Alta Italia
- Established: 25 September 1910

Government
  - Mayor: Oscar Isidro Flores

Area
  - Land: 210 sq mi (550 km^{2})
- Elevation: 453 ft (138 m)

Population (2001)
  - Total: 1,300
- Time zone: UTC−3 (ART)

Alta Italia is a village and rural locality (municipality) in Realicó Department in La Pampa Province in Argentina.

== Population ==
The village had 1,300 inhabitants at the 2001 census, representing a 12.26% population increase over the 1,158 inhabitants recorded in the 1991 census.
