= Embajador Martini =

- Rural locality and village
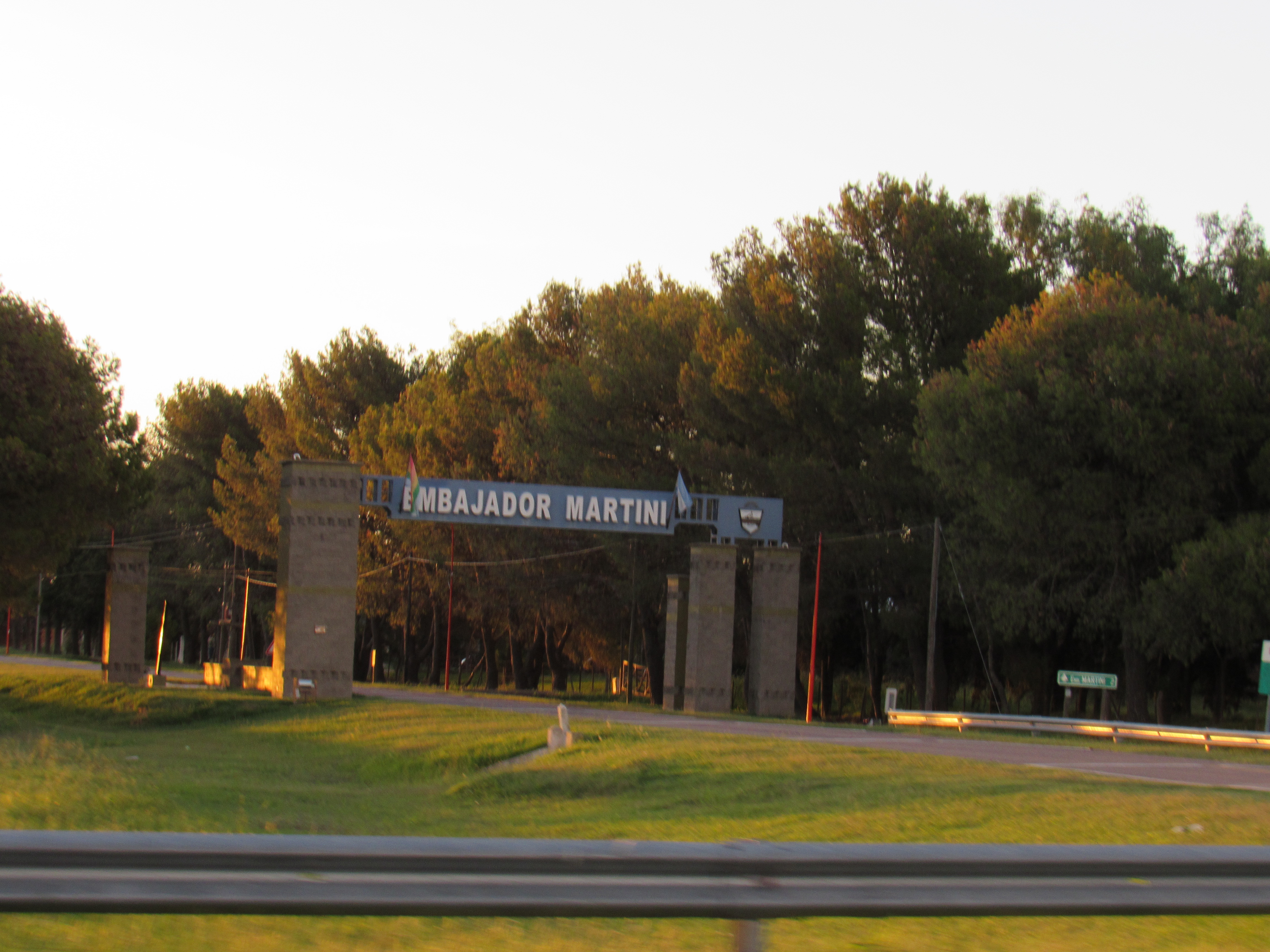
- Embajador Martini skyline

- Location within Argentina Location within La Pampa Province
- Coordinates: 35°23′09″S 64°16′58″W
- Country: Argentina
- Province: La Pampa
- Department: Realicó
- Founded: 16 June 1910
- Founder: Antonio Devoto

Government
  - Intendant: Ariel Darío Bogino

Area
  - Total: 170 sq mi (450 km^{2})
- Elevation: 449 ft (137 m)

Population (2010 census)
  - Total: 1,336
  - Density: 7.8/sq mi (3/km^{2})
- Time zone: UTC−3 (ART)
- CPA base: L6203
- Phone code: +54 02335

Embajador Martini is a village and rural locality (municipality) in Realicó Department, La Pampa in Argentina, it is located at the intersection of National Route 35 and Provincial Route 2, in the northeast of the province.
