= Limay Mahuida Department =

Coordinates: 37.1561°S 66.6758°W

- Department
- Location of Limay Mahuida Department within La Pampa Province
- Country: Argentina
- Province: La Pampa
- Capital: Limay Mahuida

Area
  - Total: 9,985 km^{2} (3,855 sq mi)

Population (2022)
  - Total: 423
  - Density: 0.0424/km^{2} (0.110/sq mi)
- Time zone: ART

Limay Mahuida Department is a department of Argentina in La Pampa Province. The capital city of the department is Limay Mahuida. With a population of 423 in 2022, it is the least populated department in Argentina, excluding Antarctic territories.
