= Atreuco Department =

Department of Argentina in La Pampa Province

Coordinates: 37.1244°S 63.6669°W

- Department
- Location of Atreuco Department within La Pampa Province
- Country: Argentina
- Province: La Pampa
- Capital: Macachín

Area
  - Total: 3,580 km^{2} (1,380 sq mi)

Population (2022)
  - Total: 11,138
  - Density: 3.11/km^{2} (8.06/sq mi)
- Time zone: ART

Atreuco Department is a department of Argentina in La Pampa Province. The capital city of the department is Macachín.
