= Fernando Cafasso =

Argentine footballer

Personal information
- Full name: Fernando Andrés Cafasso
- Date of birth: February 9, 1983 (age 43)
- Place of birth: Jacinto Aráuz, Argentina
- Height: 1.79 m (5 ft 10 in)
- Position: Midfielder

Team information
- Current team: Tiro Federal

Youth career
- 1998–2003: River Plate

Senior career*
Years	Team	Apps	(Gls)
2003–2004	Newell's Old Boys	3	(0)
2004–2005	Atlético Tucumán	23	(1)
2005–2006	Tiro Federal	26	(0)
2006–2008	Aldosivi	43	(3)
2008	Guaraní	23	(4)
2009	Treviso	10	(1)
2009–2010	Ionikos	7	(1)
2010–2011	Guaraní	8	(1)
2011–2013	Gloria Bistrița	41	(3)
2013–2017	Tiro Federal	97	(9)
Total		281	(23)
- * Club domestic league appearances and goals

Fernando Andrés Cafasso (born 9 February 1983, in Jacinto Aráuz) is an Argentine former footballer, who played as a midfielder.

== Career ==
=== Early career ===
Cafasso began his football at River Plate. Because he was not playing enough, he switched teams multiple times. He seemed to have finally found his place at Guaraní, but decided to move to Italy short after he signed for them.

=== Italy / Greece ===
Treviso was the first European team Caffaso played for. He then opted to move to Greece, at Ionikos, but did not earn a lot of matches here as well.

=== Gloria Bistrița ===
Before moving to Gloria, he had another failed spell at Guaraní. In Romania, Cafasso established himself as a key player very quickly. In spite of Gloria's relegation to Liga II, he chose not to leave the club and contributed to Gloria's promotion the following season. As of the 2012–13 season, he was chosen to be Gloria's captain by coach Nicolae Manea, thus becoming the first foreign captain in the club's history. He was released from Gloria in January 2013 when the club was put under administration.
