= General Acha =

- Town
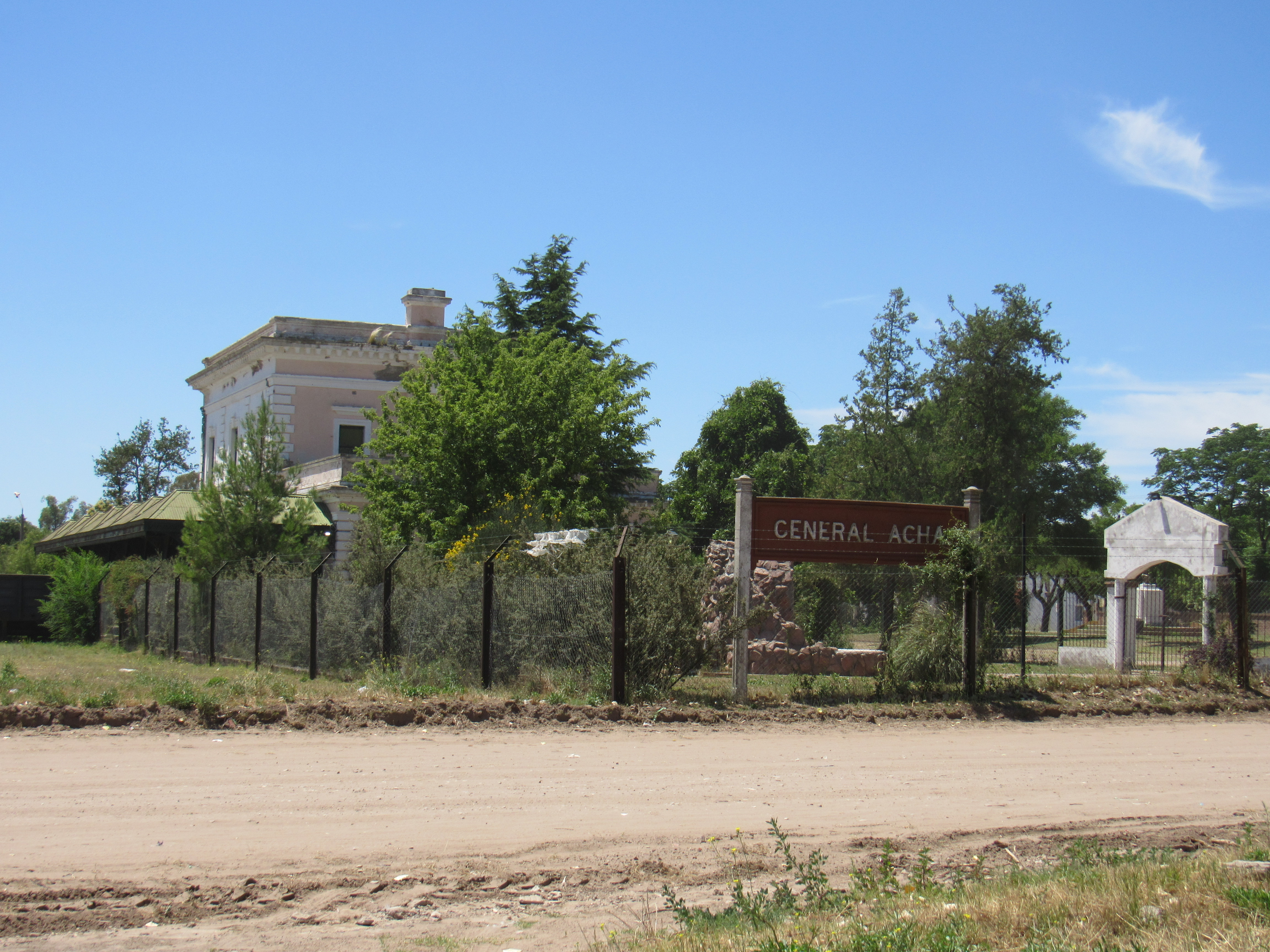

- Location within La Pampa Province Location within Argentina
- Coordinates: 37°23′00″S 64°36′00″W
- Country: Argentina
- Province: La Pampa
- Departments: Lihuel Calel, Utracán
- Founded: 12 August 1882

Government
  - Intendant: Abel Sabarots

Area
  - Total: 10,550 km^{2} (4,070 sq mi)
- Elevation: 252 m (827 ft)

Population (2010 census)
  - Total: 12,583
- Time zone: UTC−3 (ART)
- CPA base: L8200
- Phone code: +54 02952
- Website: www.generalacha.gob.ar

General Acha is a town in La Pampa Province in Argentina.
