= Chacharramendi =

- Rural locality and village
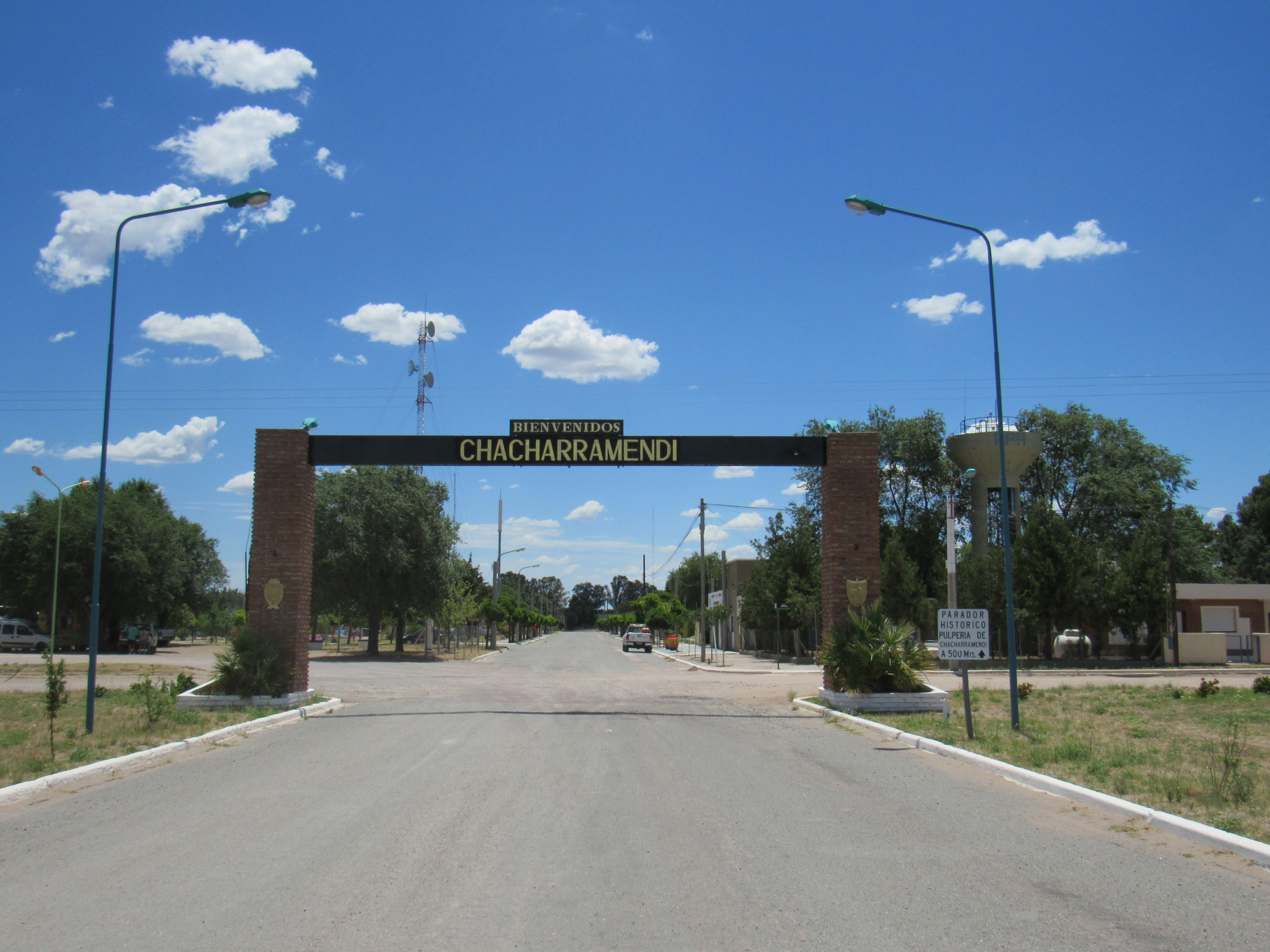
- View of Chacharramendi
- Interactive map of Chacharramendi
- Country: Argentina
- Province: La Pampa
- Time zone: UTC−3 (ART)

Chacharramendi is a village and rural locality (municipality) in the department of Utracán in La Pampa Province in Argentina.
