= Quehué =

Coordinates: 37°08′S 64°31′W

- Rural locality and village
- Interactive map of Quehué
- Country: Argentina
- Province: La Pampa
- Department: Utracán
- Time zone: UTC−3 (ART)

Quehué is a village and rural locality (municipality) in La Pampa Province in Argentina.
