= Puelches, La Pampa =

Puelches
- Rural locality and village
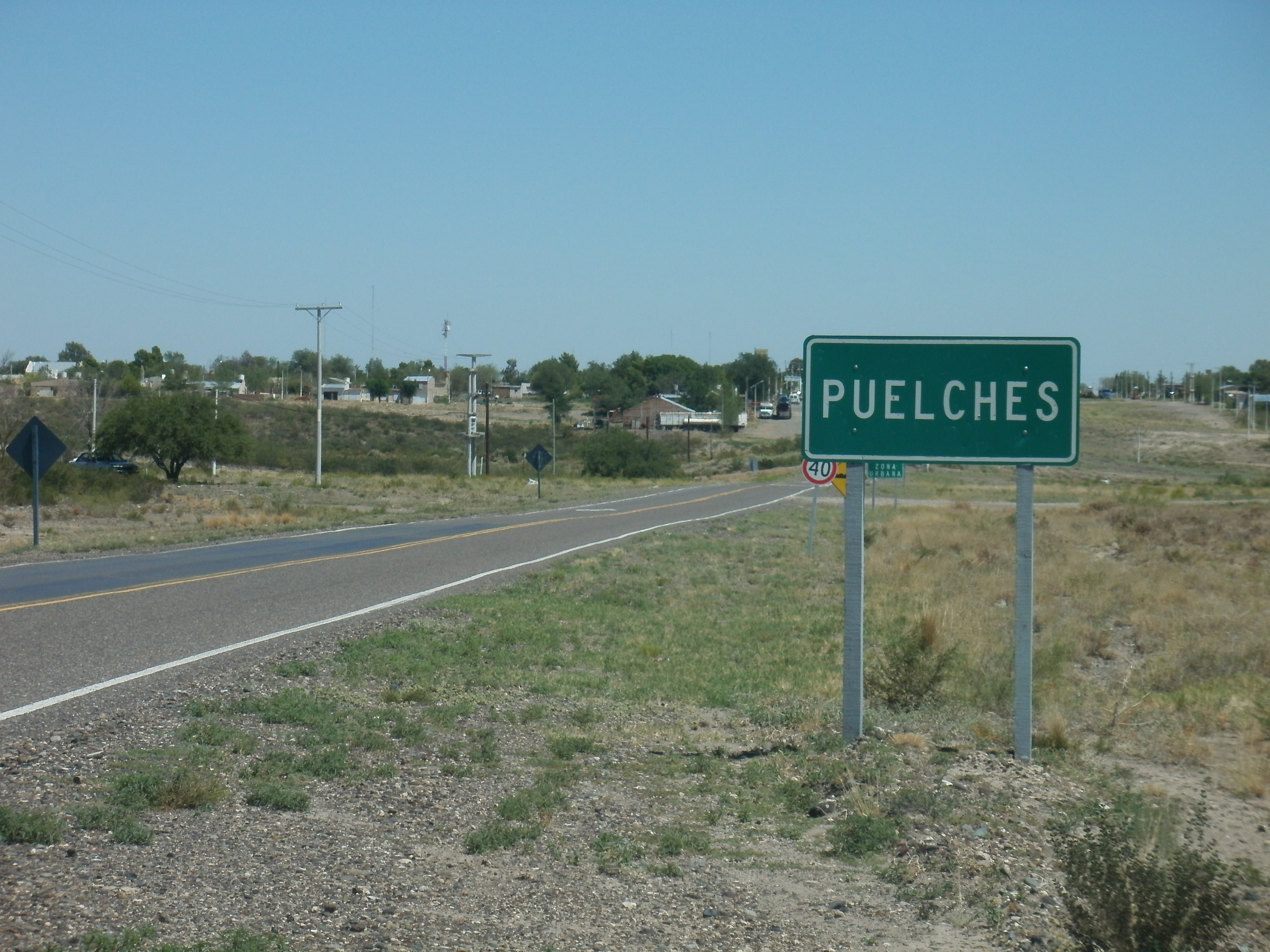
- Puelches city sign

- Location within Argentina
- Coordinates: 38°09′S 65°55′W
- Country: Argentina
- Province: La Pampa
- Founded: 24 February 1900

Area
  - Total: 3,070 sq mi (7,950 km^{2})
- Elevation: 728 ft (222 m)

Population (2010 census [INDEC])
  - Total: 560
- Time zone: UTC−3 (ART)
- CPA Base: 8201
- Area code: +54 02952

Puelches is a village and rural locality (municipality) lying on the National Route 152 in La Pampa Province in Argentina. It serves as the administrative center of the Curacó Department with its rural area expanding into the Lihuel Calel Department in the south of the province.

Though it was founded as a cattle town, in a traditional farming area, the main economic activities are salt production and mining. It is considered Argentina's geographical center by a national decree from 1978.

== Etymology ==
The town was referred to as Los Puelches by the media in the early 20th century. In 1941, the Governor of the province, Miguel Duval, proposed to rename it Coronel Bedoya to honor one of the officers who participated in the Conquest of the Desert. The proposal met criticism and it was decided to keep the original name which refers to the native Puelche people that inhabited the area before the arrival of the Argentine Army. The Mapudungun word can be translated as 'people from the east'.

== History ==
The area of Puelches has been populated by a series of natives for thousands of years, who were generally known as Puelche. The term did not refer to them as an ethnic group, but was rather a reference to the area they inhabited. In the 16th century, the Mapuche started their expansion into the area, assimilating the then-local hunting-gathering tribes, who called themselves gününa-këna, into their culture. The area was taken over and incorporated into the Argentine state, after the natives were defeated in the Conquest of the Desert in the 1870s by the national troops.

The village was founded in 1900 as an agricultural colony, named Los Puelches, by a national decree. Six years later, the local school, the magistrate's court and the civil registry were opened. In the early years of the 20th century Spanish and French settlers came into the region and integrated with the remaining locals and the creole population. Into the 1940s the region flourished as the growing flow of the Salado River enabled activities such as cattle farming, fishing and mining. It came to an end when the river flow was diverted by western provinces, causing a significant loss of surface waters in the whole province.

In 1978, Puelches was officially recognized as Argentina's geographical center by a national decree. A stone marker indicates the exact center. The developing committee was granted the municipality status in 1995.

== Geography ==
The village lies in south of La Pampa province, serving as the seat of the Curacó Department with its rural area expanding into the Lihuel Calel Department. The town is served by National Route 152, Provincial Route 107 and Provincial Route 15. It is located 272 km (169 mi) from the province capital, Santa Rosa and 782 km (486 mi) from Buenos Aires.

The elevation is 222 m (728 ft) above sea level. The Salado River runs through the region, irrigating the La Dulce, La Amarga and the Urre Lauquen lagoons, before joining the Colorado River near Pichi Mahuida.

=== Climate ===
Just as a big part of La Pampa province, Puelches has a temperate climate.

Climate data for Puelches, La Pampa (1961–1970)
Month	Jan	Feb	Mar	Apr	May	Jun	Jul	Aug	Sep	Oct	Nov	Dec	Year
Record high °C (°F)	41.3 (106.3)	41.0 (105.8)	37.9 (100.2)	36.5 (97.7)	28.5 (83.3)	26.0 (78.8)	26.3 (79.3)	28.9 (84.0)	36.0 (96.8)	36.9 (98.4)	42.1 (107.8)	42.0 (107.6)	42.1 (107.8)
Mean daily maximum °C (°F)	32.6 (90.7)	31.6 (88.9)	28.2 (82.8)	23.4 (74.1)	19.1 (66.4)	14.2 (57.6)	14.2 (57.6)	17.5 (63.5)	19.7 (67.5)	23.1 (73.6)	28.1 (82.6)	30.9 (87.6)	23.6 (74.5)
Daily mean °C (°F)	24.4 (75.9)	23.1 (73.6)	20.0 (68.0)	15.0 (59.0)	10.6 (51.1)	6.7 (44.1)	6.6 (43.9)	8.7 (47.7)	11.8 (53.2)	15.7 (60.3)	20.2 (68.4)	22.8 (73.0)	15.5 (59.9)
Mean daily minimum °C (°F)	15.6 (60.1)	14.5 (58.1)	11.7 (53.1)	7.2 (45.0)	3.9 (39.0)	0.8 (33.4)	0.5 (32.9)	1.6 (34.9)	4.3 (39.7)	7.7 (45.9)	11.7 (53.1)	13.8 (56.8)	7.8 (46.0)
Record low °C (°F)	4.8 (40.6)	3.4 (38.1)	−1.6 (29.1)	−4.1 (24.6)	−9.0 (15.8)	−12.1 (10.2)	−12.4 (9.7)	−9.7 (14.5)	−8.6 (16.5)	−4.6 (23.7)	0.9 (33.6)	2.9 (37.2)	−12.4 (9.7)
Average precipitation mm (inches)	43.0 (1.69)	37.0 (1.46)	58.0 (2.28)	37.4 (1.47)	15.5 (0.61)	13.3 (0.52)	14.5 (0.57)	13.7 (0.54)	26.6 (1.05)	41.4 (1.63)	35.7 (1.41)	42.8 (1.69)	378.9 (14.92)
Average relative humidity (%)	40	42	49	58	69	75	73	60	55	52	47	43	55
Percentage possible sunshine	71	79	71	64	55	43	45	56	53	63	65	62	61
Source: Secretaria de Mineria

== Demographics ==
In 2020 it was estimated that 870 residents inhabited the area. As of 2010, the Argentine census showed 560 residents in the municipality, which is a slight increase of 3,7% in comparison to 2001, when 540 people inhabited the area. In 1991 Puelches had a population of approximately 352 people.

== Economy ==
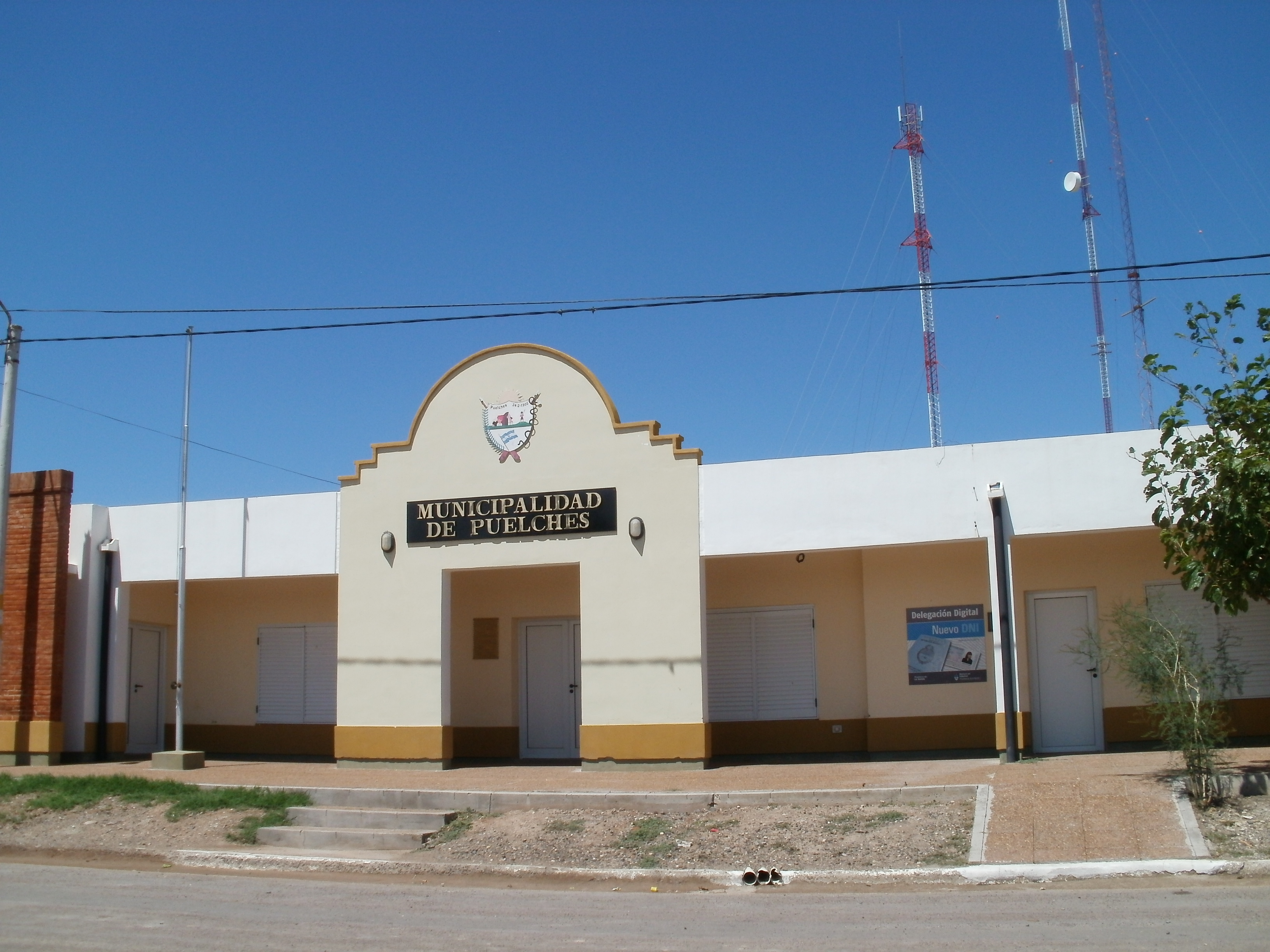
Town hall

Despite being located in a livestock farming area, the town's economy is based on salt production, taking place in the nearby evaporation ponds. Mining also contributes to the local economy, with copper and sodium sulfate being extracted in the area. Being the closest town to the Lihué Calel National Park, it serves as a service center for the tourists visiting the National Park.

== Landmarks ==
In Puelches, it is possible to visit the stone that indicates Argentina's exact geographical center.

The old chapel Angel Custodio, built by the locals in 1963 using almost entirely stone and some other materials from the region, remains almost in its original form. Another exponent of the local history is the monument honoring cacique Ñancufil Calderón, one of the town's founding members.
