= Luan Toro =

Coordinates: 36°12′S 65°06′W

- Rural locality and village
- Interactive map of Luan Toro
- Country: Argentina
- Province: La Pampa Province
- Time zone: UTC−3 (ART)

Luan Toro is a village and rural locality (municipality) in La Pampa Province in Argentina.
