= Curacó Department =

Coordinates: 38.1397°S 65.9158°W

- Department
- Location of Curacó Department within La Pampa Province
- Country: Argentina
- Province: La Pampa
- Capital: Puelches

Area
  - Total: 13,125 km^{2} (5,068 sq mi)

Population (2022)
  - Total: 1,116
  - Density: 0.08503/km^{2} (0.2202/sq mi)
- Time zone: ART

Curacó Department is a department of Argentina in La Pampa Province. The capital city of the department is Puelches.
