= Chalileo Department =

Coordinates: 36.2256°S 66.9403°W

- Department
- Location of Chalileo Department within La Pampa Province
- Country: Argentina
- Province: La Pampa
- Capital: Santa Isabel

Area
  - Total: 8,917 km^{2} (3,443 sq mi)

Population (2022)
  - Total: 2,885
  - Density: 0.3235/km^{2} (0.8380/sq mi)
- Time zone: ART

Chalileo Department is a department of Argentina in La Pampa Province. The capital city of the department is Santa Isabel. In 2016, the population of the area was 2,493.
