= Monte Nievas =

Coordinates: 35°52′S 64°09′W

- Rural locality and village
- Interactive map of Monte Nievas
- Country: Argentina
- Province: La Pampa
- Time zone: UTC−3 (ART)

Monte Nievas is a village and rural locality (municipality) in La Pampa Province in Argentina.
