= Mauricio Mayer =

Coordinates: 36°14′S 64°02′W

- Rural locality and village
- Interactive map of Mauricio Mayer
- Country: Argentina
- Province: La Pampa
- Time zone: UTC−3 (ART)

Mauricio Mayer is a village and rural locality (municipality) in La Pampa Province in Argentina.
