= Anzoategui, La Pampa =

Locality in Caleu Caleu, La Pampa, Argentina

Coordinates: 38°58′00″S 63°51′00″W

Anzoategui is a locality in Caleu Caleu Department, La Pampa Province, Argentina.
