= Utracán Department =

Utracán Departamento Utracán
- Department
- Country: Argentina
- Seat: General Acha

Area
  - Total: 12,967 km^{2} (5,007 sq mi)

Population (2022)
  - Total: 17,802
  - Density: 1.3729/km^{2} (3.5557/sq mi)

Utracán is a department of the province of La Pampa (Argentina).

Its governing body is called Comisión de Fomento.

== Municipalities and villages ==
The department of Utracán comprises three municipalities and three villages.

=== Municipalities ===
- General Acha
- Ataliva Roca
- Quehué

=== Villages ===
- Chacharramendi
- Colonia Santa María
- Unanue
