= Relmo =

Coordinates: 36°15′S 63°27′W

- Rural locality and village
- Interactive map of Relmo
- Country: Argentina
- Province: La Pampa Province
- Time zone: UTC−3 (ART)

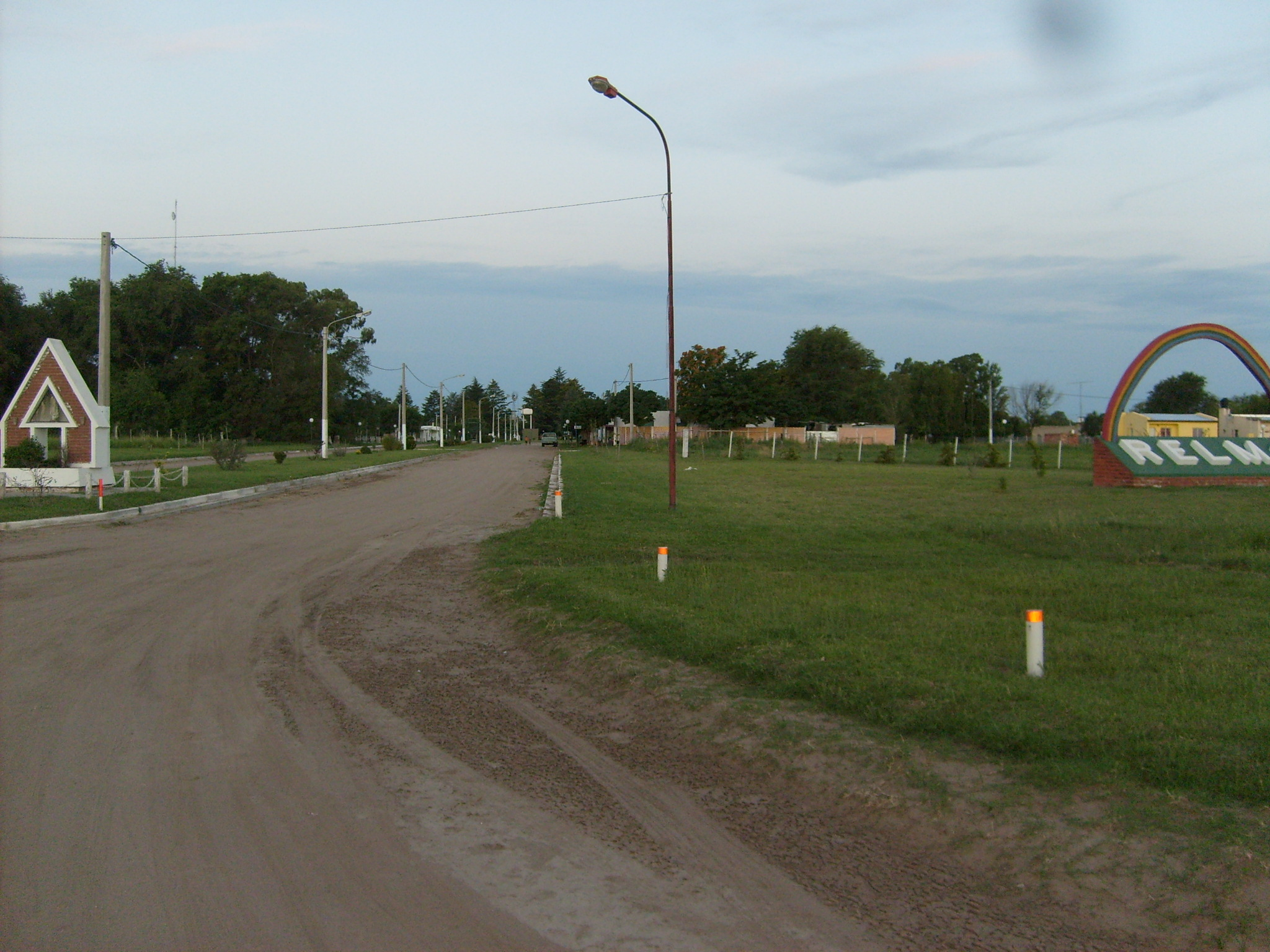
Access to Relmo, La Pampa Province.

Relmo is a village and rural locality (municipality) in La Pampa Province in Argentina.
