= Abramo, La Pampa =

Coordinates: 37°53′S 63°51′W

Abramo
- Rural locality and village
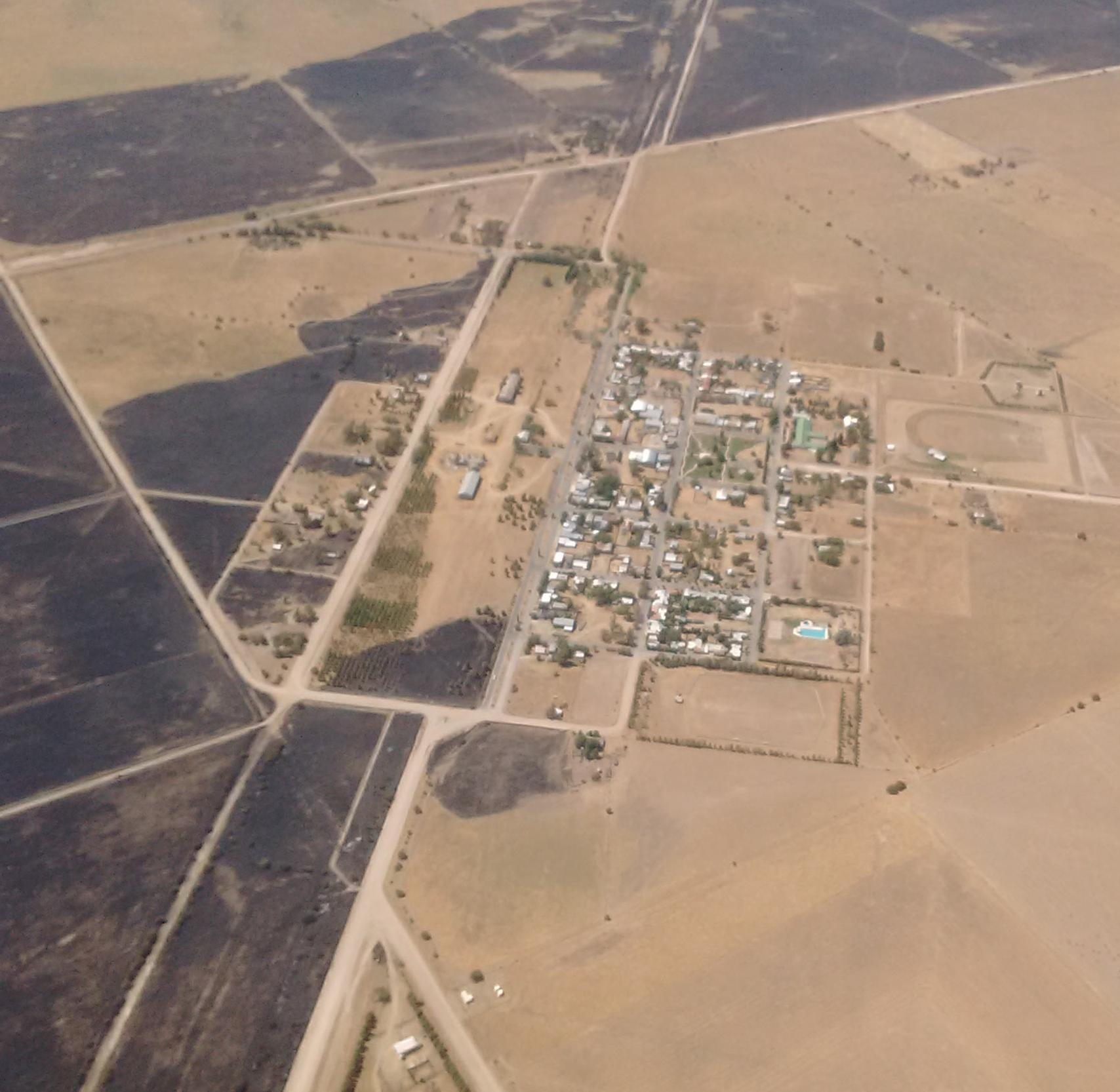
- View of Abramo, La Pampa

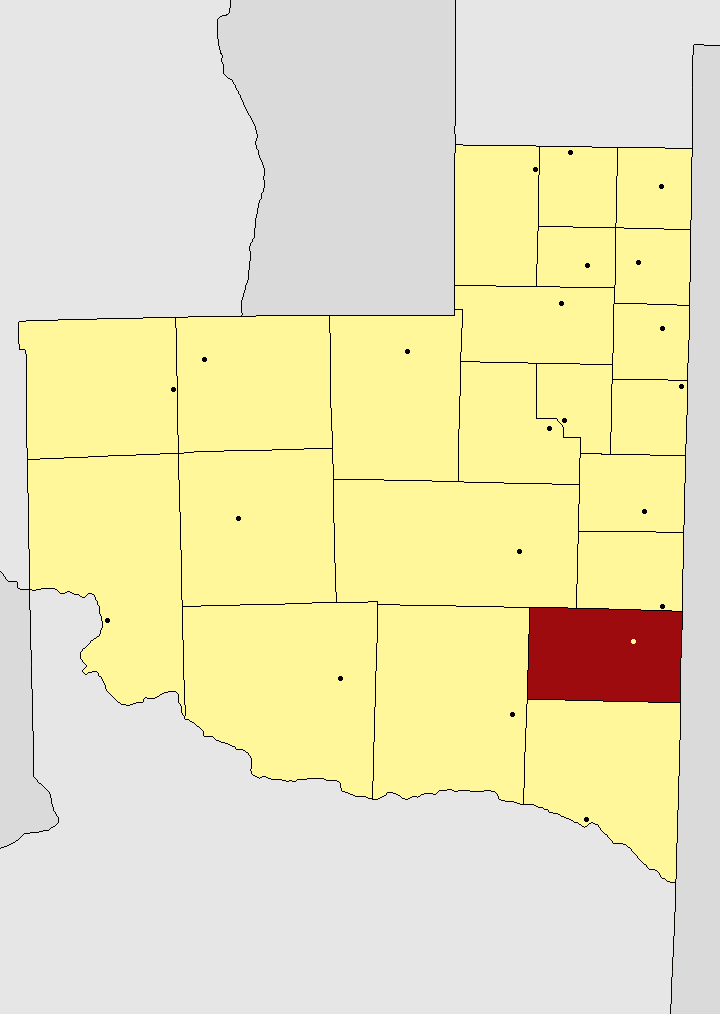
- Country: Argentina
- Province: La Pampa Province
- Department: Hucal

Government
  - Mayor: Horacio Alberto Rosas

Population (2001, INDEC)
  - Total: 323
- Time zone: UTC−3 (ART)
- Postcode: L8212
- Area code: 02926

Abramo is a village and rural locality (municipality) in La Pampa Province in Argentina.

The village is reachable via Ruta Provincial 3, which is a connection to Ruta Nacional 35.

== Population ==
Abramo has a population of 323 inhabitants according to the 2001 INDEC census, which represents a slight increase of 0.6% over the previous 321 inhabitants that were recorded in the 1991 INDEC census.
