= Puelén Department =

Coordinates: 37.7686°S 67.7139°W

- Department
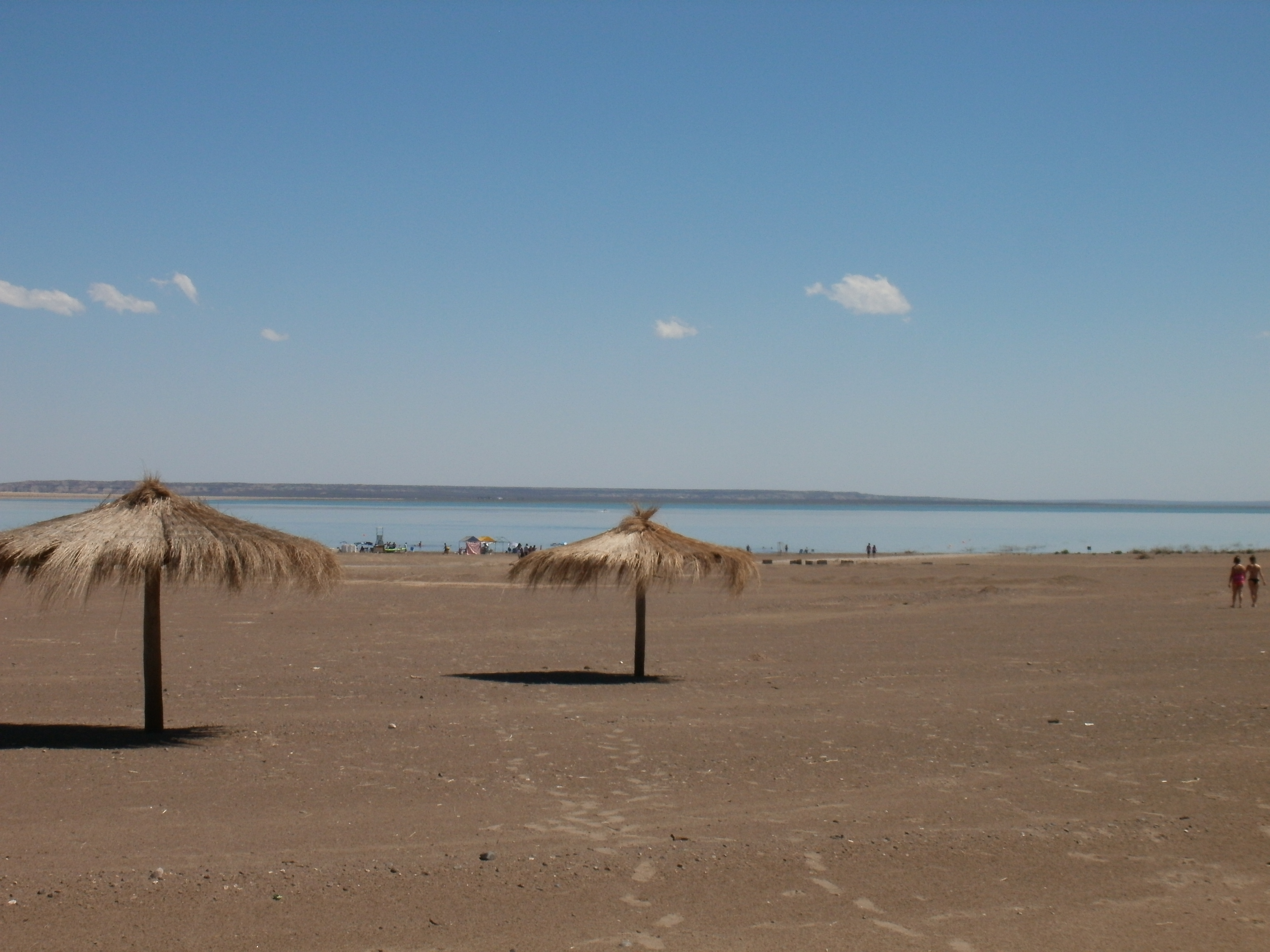

- Location of Puelén Department within La Pampa Province
- Country: Argentina
- Province: La Pampa
- Capital: Veinticinco de Mayo

Area
  - Total: 13,160 km^{2} (5,080 sq mi)

Population (2022)
  - Total: 11,654
  - Density: 0.8856/km^{2} (2.294/sq mi)
- Time zone: ART

Puelén Department is a department of Argentina in La Pampa Province. The capital city of the department is Veinticinco de Mayo.
