= La Humada =

Coordinates: 36°21′S 68°00′W

- Rural locality and village
- Interactive map of La Humada
- Country: Argentina
- Province: La Pampa Province
- Time zone: UTC−3 (ART)

La Humada is a village and rural locality (municipality) in La Pampa Province in Argentina.
