= Realicó Department =

Realicó Departamento Realicó
- Department
- Country: Argentina
- Seat: Realicó

Area
  - Total: 2,450 km^{2} (950 sq mi)

Population (2022)
  - Total: 17,470
  - Density: 7.13/km^{2} (18.5/sq mi)

Realicó is a department of the province of La Pampa (Argentina).

== Villages ==
- Alta Italia
- Embajador Martini
