= Metileo =

Coordinates: 35°45′S 63°56′W

- Rural locality and village
- Interactive map of Metileo
- Country: Argentina
- Province: La Pampa
- Time zone: UTC−3 (ART)

Metileo is a village and rural locality (municipality) in La Pampa Province in Argentina.
