= Jacinto Arauz =

- Town
- Location within Argentina
- Coordinates: 38.0845°S 63.4296°W
- Country: Argentina
- Province: La Pampa
- Department: Hucal
- Founded: April 6, 1889
- Elevation: 345 m (1,132 ft)

Population (INDEC, 2010)
  - Total: 2,434
- Time zone: UTC−3 (ART)
- Argentine Postal Code: L8208
- Area code: 2925

Jacinto Arauz is a town in Hucal, La Pampa Province, Argentina. The town was founded in 1889.

The town lies about 2 miles south of National Route 35 and 125 miles southeast of Santa Rosa, the province capital.

The economy of the town is primarily based on agriculture, mining, and tourism. The town was often mentioned by René Favaloro, as it is where he began his career in medicine. The town now has a museum of rural medicine named in his honor.

== Population ==
Jacinto Arauz had 2,434 inhabitants as of 2010, representing a decrease of 1.2% compared with 2,463 inhabitants in the 2001 census.

== Museum of rural medicine ==
Jacinto Arauz's Museum of Rural Medicine is named after Dr. René Favaloro, who began his career in medicine in the town. The museum houses a number of artifacts, including surgical tools used by local doctors.

== Notable people ==
- Dora Barrancos, researcher and sociologist
