= Puelén =

Coordinates: 37°22′S 67°37′W

- Rural locality and village
- Interactive map of Puelén
- Country: Argentina
- Province: La Pampa
- Time zone: UTC−3 (ART)

Puelén is a village and rural locality (municipality) in La Pampa Province in Argentina.
