= La Gloria, La Pampa =

Coordinates: 36°31′S 63°45′W

La Gloria (La Pampa)
- Rural locality and village
- Interactive map of La Gloria (La Pampa)
- Country: Argentina
- Province: La Pampa Province
- Time zone: UTC−3 (ART)

La Gloria (La Pampa) is a village and rural locality (municipality) in La Pampa Province in Argentina.
