= Pichi Huinca =

Coordinates: 35°38′S 64°46′W

- Rural locality and village
- Interactive map of Pichi Huinca
- Country: Argentina
- Province: La Pampa Province
- Time zone: UTC−3 (ART)

Pichi Huinca is a village and rural locality (municipality) in La Pampa Province in Argentina.
