= Chical Có Department =

Coordinates: 36.3983°S 67.1442°W

- Department
- Location of Chical Có Department within La Pampa Province
- Country: Argentina
- Province: La Pampa
- Capital: Algarrobo del Águila

Area
  - Total: 9,117 km^{2} (3,520 sq mi)

Population (2022)
  - Total: 1,466
  - Density: 0.1608/km^{2} (0.4165/sq mi)
- Time zone: ART

Chical Có Department is a department of Argentina in La Pampa Province. The capital city of the department is Algarrobo del Águila.
