= Catriló Department =

Coordinates: 36.4064°S 63.4236°W

- Department
- Location of Catriló Department within La Pampa Province
- Country: Argentina
- Province: La Pampa
- Capital: Catriló

Area
  - Total: 2,555 km^{2} (986 sq mi)

Population (2022)
  - Total: 8,235
  - Density: 3.223/km^{2} (8.348/sq mi)
- Time zone: ART

Catriló Department is a department of Argentina in La Pampa Province. The capital city of the department is Catriló.
