= Ojeda, La Pampa =

Coordinates: 35°20′S 64°00′W

Ojeda
- Rural locality and village
- Interactive map of Ojeda
- Country: Argentina
- Province: La Pampa Province
- Time zone: UTC−3 (ART)

Ojeda is a village and rural locality (municipality) in La Pampa Province in Argentina.
