= Catriló =

Coordinates: 36°26′S 63°24′W

- Town
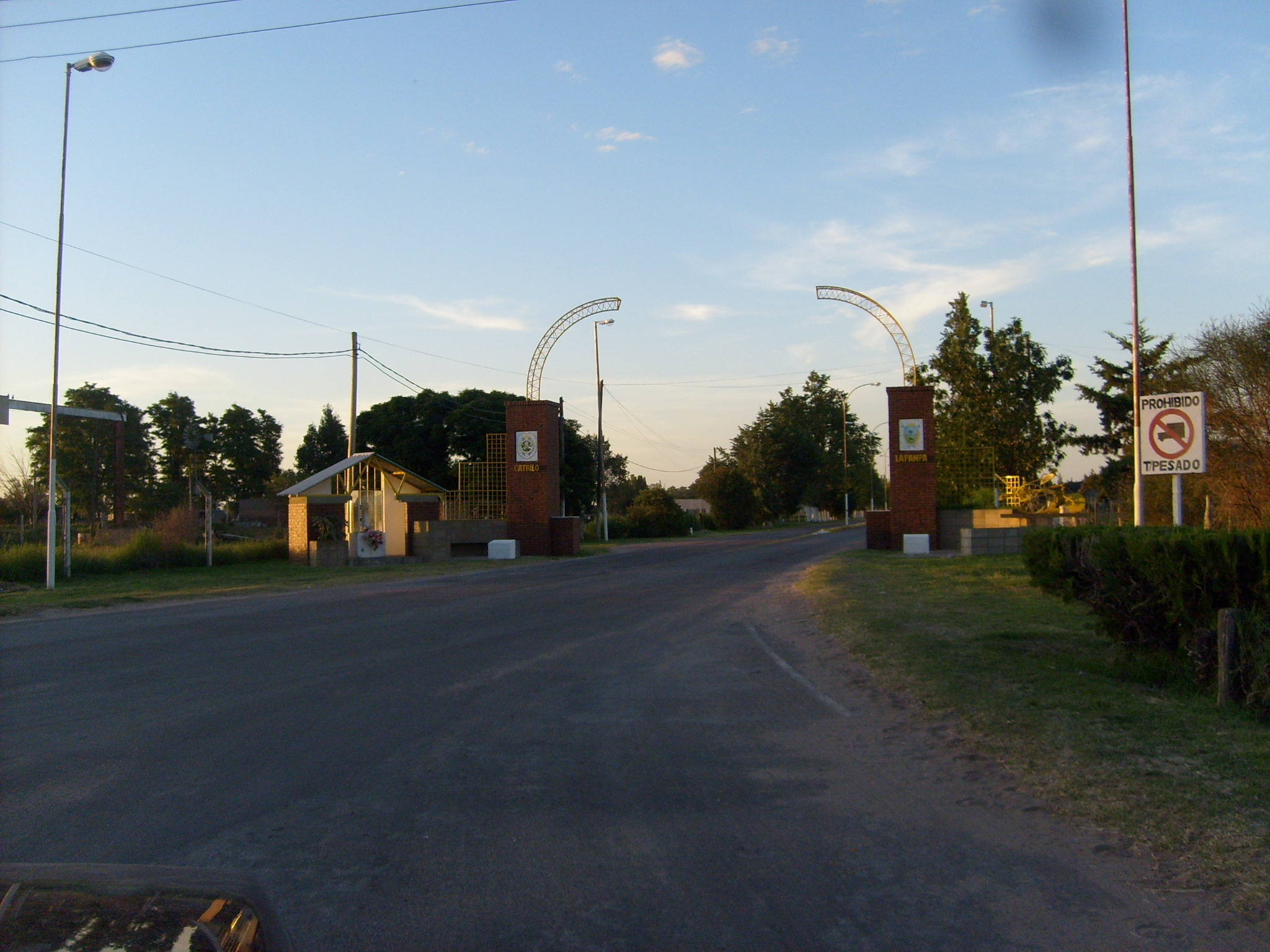

- Location of Catriló in Argentina Catriló (La Pampa Province)
- Country: Argentina
- Province: La Pampa
- Department: Catriló
- Founded: 1887

Government
  - Intendant: Roberto Ricardo Delfino (PJ)
- Elevation: 371 ft (113 m)

Population (2010 census)
  - Total: 7,521
- Time zone: UTC−3 (ART)
- CPA base: L6330
- Website: Official website

Catriló is a town in La Pampa Province in Argentina, it is located at the intersection of National Route 5 and Provincial Route 1, in the northeast of the province.

== Name ==
The name Catriló derives from the Mapuche expression that means "cut dune".
