= Realicó =

- City
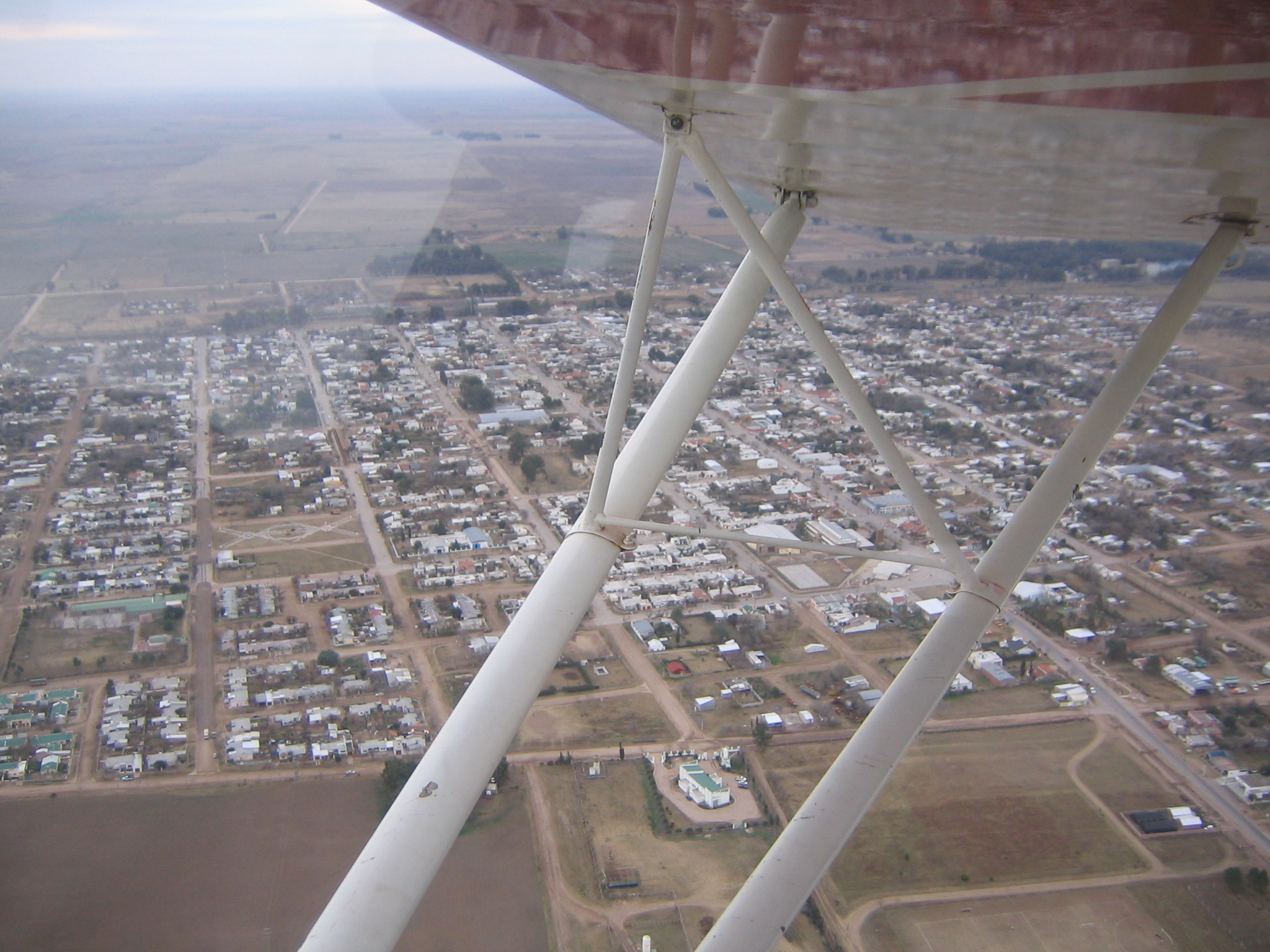
- Aerial view of Realicó

- Seal

- Location in Argentina
- Coordinates: 35°02′20″S 64°14′50″W
- Country: Argentina
- Province: La Pampa
- Department: Realicó
- Established: 2 March 1907
- Founder: Tomás Leopoldo Mullally

Government
  - Mayor: Javier Facundo Sola (PJ)

Area
  - Total: 475 km^{2} (183 sq mi)
- Elevation: 146 m (479 ft)

Population (2010 census)
  - Total: 7,591
  - Density: 16.0/km^{2} (41.4/sq mi)
- Time zone: UTC−3 (ART)
- Dialing code: +54 342
- Website: www.realico.gov.ar

CELI

Realicó is a city in La Pampa Province, Argentina. It was founded the second of March in 1907 by Tomás Leopoldo Mullally. The small farming town has a population of about 7,000. There is one stoplight, and it is always blinking. A major employer of the town is the Cargill flour mill, although recently the mill's importance has waned, supporting fewer workers as the economy has become more services-oriented. There are three high schools, including a technical school (EPET), a business school, and a private, Catholic school (IPSF). There are also private English schools, including EIR and CELI. Teenagers from neighboring towns flock to Realicó every Saturday night to go to Ladrillo Disco, a popular nightclub.
