= Tomás Manuel de Anchorena, La Pampa =

Tomás Manuel de Anchorena
- Rural locality and village
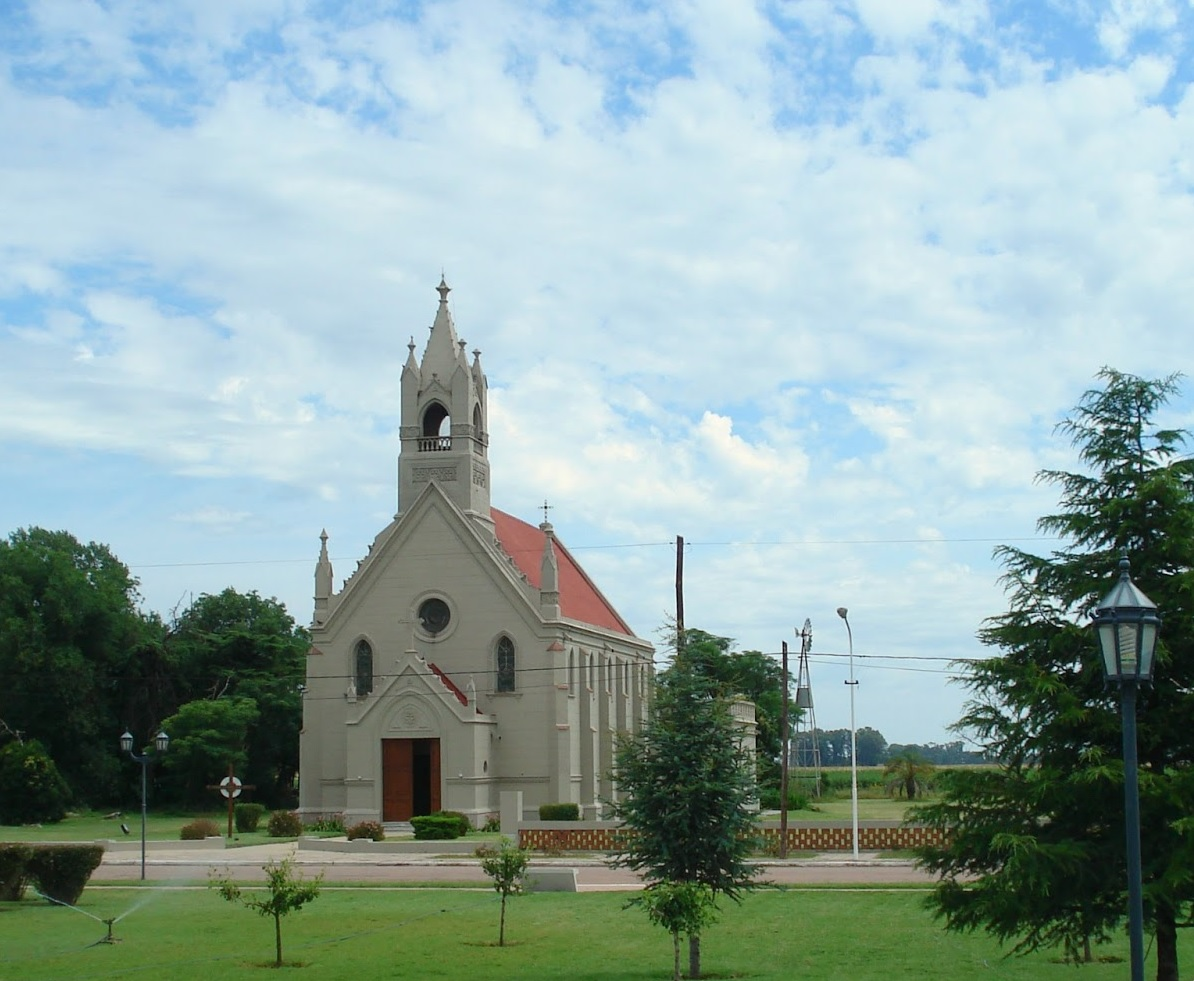
- Church in Tomás Manuel de Anchorena.

- Location within Argentina
- Coordinates: 36°51′S 63°31′W
- Country: Argentina
- Province: La Pampa Province
- Department: Atreucó

Tomás Manuel de Anchorena is a village and rural locality (municipality) in La Pampa Province in Argentina.
