= Agustoni =

Coordinates: 35°47′S 63°24′W

- Rural locality and village
- Interactive map of Agustoni
- Country: Argentina
- Province: La Pampa
- Department: Maracó
- Established: 19 May 1919

Population (2001)
  - Total: 268
- Time zone: UTC−3 (ART)
- Postal code: L6361
- Area code: 02302

Agustoni is a village and rural locality (municipality) in La Pampa Province in Argentina.

== Population ==
Agustoni had a population of 268 inhabitants (INDEC, 2001), which represents a 24% increase over the previous population which was at 216 inhabitants (INDEC, 1991) in the previous census.
