= Santa Isabel, La Pampa =

Santa Isabel
- Town
- Location of Santa Isabel in Argentina
- Coordinates: 36°15′S 66°56′W
- Country: Argentina
- Province: La Pampa
- Department: Chalileo

Population
  - Total: 2,493
- Time zone: UTC−3 (ART)
- CPA base: L6321
- Dialing code: +54 2338

Santa Isabel is a town in the province of La Pampa, Argentina. It had 2,493 inhabitants at the 2001 census [INDEC], and is the head town of the Chalileo Department. It lies on the west of the province, 240 km from the provincial capital Santa Rosa, by National Route 143, near the junction of the borders of the provinces of La Pampa, San Luis and Mendoza, in the area of the Atuel River marshlands.

== Geography ==
=== Climate ===
Climate data for Santa Isabel, La Pampa (1951–1960 and 1978–1985)
Month	Jan	Feb	Mar	Apr	May	Jun	Jul	Aug	Sep	Oct	Nov	Dec	Year
Record high °C (°F)	42.4 (108.3)	40.3 (104.5)	38.9 (102.0)	33.0 (91.4)	30.5 (86.9)	26.8 (80.2)	28.0 (82.4)	30.1 (86.2)	33.2 (91.8)	39.4 (102.9)	39.2 (102.6)	42.3 (108.1)	42.4 (108.3)
Mean daily maximum °C (°F)	32.8 (91.0)	31.3 (88.3)	29.0 (84.2)	23.0 (73.4)	19.8 (67.6)	14.6 (58.3)	15.6 (60.1)	18.5 (65.3)	21.8 (71.2)	24.4 (75.9)	29.0 (84.2)	31.7 (89.1)	24.3 (75.7)
Daily mean °C (°F)	24.2 (75.6)	22.8 (73.0)	20.6 (69.1)	15.0 (59.0)	11.4 (52.5)	7.0 (44.6)	7.9 (46.2)	9.2 (48.6)	13.0 (55.4)	15.9 (60.6)	20.2 (68.4)	23.2 (73.8)	15.8 (60.4)
Mean daily minimum °C (°F)	14.8 (58.6)	13.6 (56.5)	11.8 (53.2)	7.2 (45.0)	3.4 (38.1)	−0.2 (31.6)	0.6 (33.1)	1.0 (33.8)	2.3 (36.1)	7.1 (44.8)	10.4 (50.7)	13.4 (56.1)	7.2 (45.0)
Record low °C (°F)	3.4 (38.1)	0.4 (32.7)	0.6 (33.1)	−4.6 (23.7)	−8.6 (16.5)	−11.4 (11.5)	−14.4 (6.1)	−11.3 (11.7)	−10.1 (13.8)	−4.1 (24.6)	−1.1 (30.0)	1.3 (34.3)	−14.4 (6.1)
Average precipitation mm (inches)	48 (1.9)	48 (1.9)	58 (2.3)	35 (1.4)	15 (0.6)	14 (0.6)	14 (0.6)	11 (0.4)	24 (0.9)	43 (1.7)	54 (2.1)	52 (2.0)	416 (16.4)
Average relative humidity (%)	44	44	52	61	62	67	62	52	48	48	45	41	50
Source: Secretaria de Mineria
