= Bernasconi, Argentina =

Bernasconi
- Village
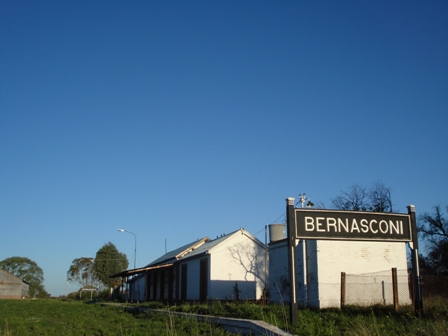

- Location within La Pampa Province Location within Argentina
- Coordinates: 37°54′00″S 63°43′00″W
- Country: Argentina
- Province: La Pampa
- Department: Hucal
- Established: March 16, 1888

Government
  - Intendant: Pablo Germán Rauschenberger
- Elevation: 162 m (531 ft)

Population (2001 Census)
  - Total: 1,781
- Time zone: UTC−3 (ART)
- CPA Base: L 3023
- Area code: +54 2925
- Climate: Dfc

Bernasconi is a village and the capital of the Hucal Department of La Pampa Province, Argentina.

== Name ==
In 1878, the Argentine state divided the lands in the "desert", granting the territory in question to Don Ernesto Tornquist, who subsequently sold his lands to Alfonso Bernasconi in 1884. In 1888, Bernasconi, seeing that several families had by then settled on his lands, decided to found a settlement, to which he gave his own name.

== Local festivals ==
Fiesta del Piquillín

This is the traditional festival of the locality and dates back to the 1980s. It takes places in March, marking the anniversary of the village's founding, and is organised by the Commission of Culture attached to the municipal authorities. It promotes local crafts and features performances by folk singers of local and national prominence.

Fiesta de los Alemanes

This annual "Festival of the Germans" takes place in October, coinciding with the Octoberfest beer festivals held in Villa General Belgrano in Córdoba, Argentina, and in Blumenau in Brasil. It is organised by the Commission of Descendents of Germans and typically involves a display of local dances and a sampling of regional specialities with a German origin, brought to the region by Volga Germans who had migrated from Russia.
