= Macachín =

Coordinates: 37°09′S 63°39′W

- Town
- Interactive map of Macachín
- Country: Argentina
- Province: La Pampa

Government
  - Mayor: Cabak Jorge (PJ)

Area
  - Total: 290 sq mi (750 km^{2})
- Elevation: 430 ft (130 m)

Population (2001 INDEC)
  - Total: 4,554
- Time zone: UTC−3 (ART)
- Postcode: L6307

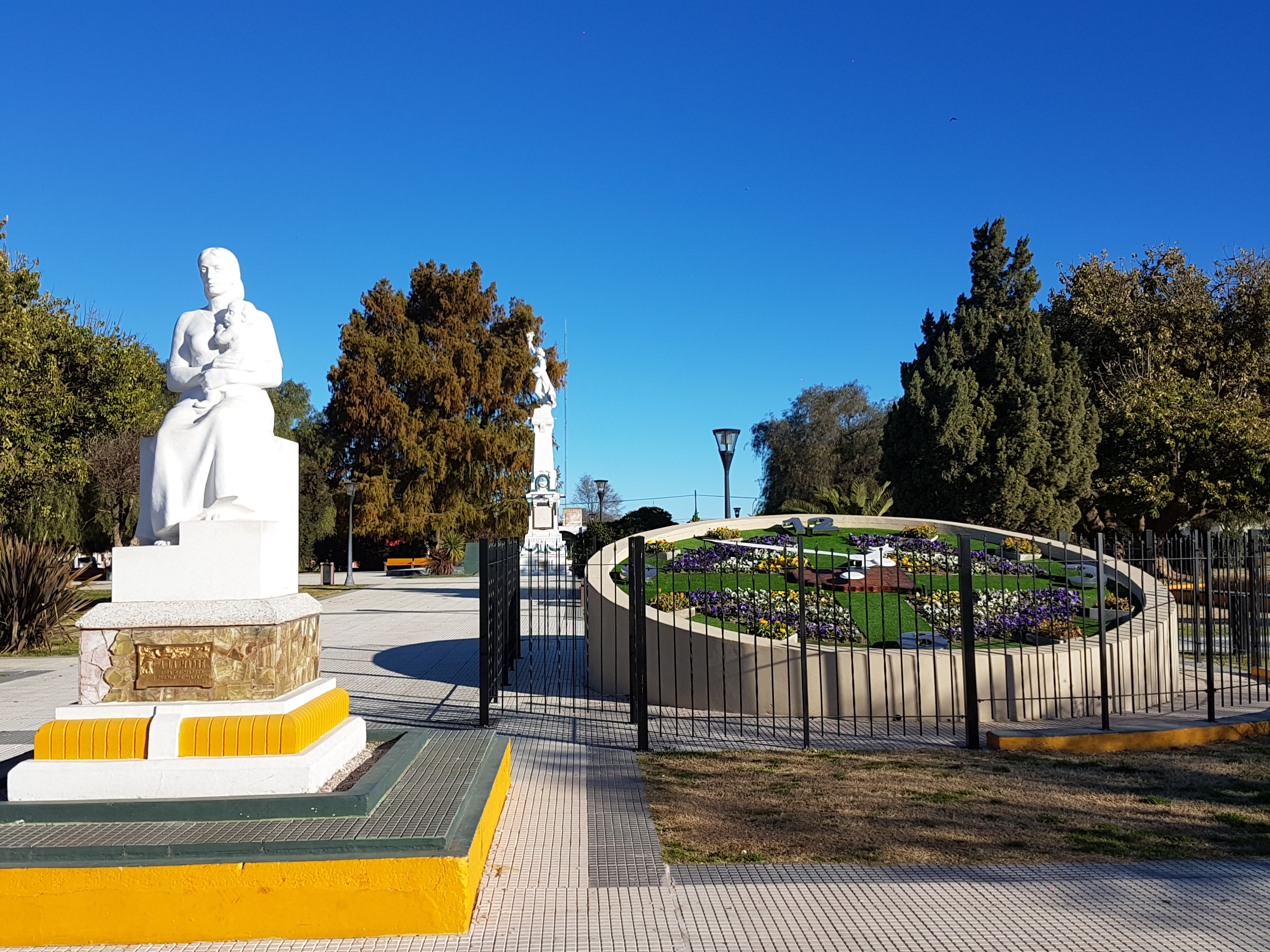
Macachín

Macachín is a town in La Pampa Province in Argentina.

== Shields ==
Its authors are Robert Auche and Gratitude Group. The Macachin shield is oval in shape, divided into four fields. In the top field that is located on the left, find a sun represents life and the bull located in the opposite camp symbolizes livestock, important in the area. In the second half (from left to right) shows rows of the earth, meaning the agricultural potential and heaps of other resources salt of the place. The torch that holds the figure of a woman in her right hand, symbolizing the way, and the book in his left hand, wisdom. This image is in the center of the town square. At the foot of the woman on a blue background, you can see the flowers that were Macachin that gave rise to the name of the town. The pin is located in the left of the oval contour symbolizes agriculture and laurels (on the right boundary) glory. In blue and white ribbon is the year of the founding of the town and the words "progress and peace." The shield was put into effect on October 30, 1977.
