= Anzoátegui, Tolima =

Coordinates: 4.63389°N 75.0972°W

Anzoátegui
- Municipality and town
- Flag Coat of arms

- Location of the municipality and town of Anzoátegui in the Tolima Department of Colombia.
- Country: Colombia
- Department: Tolima Department

Area
  - Total: 475 km^{2} (183 sq mi)
- Elevation: 2,010 m (6,590 ft)

Population (2017)
  - Total: 18,849
- Time zone: UTC-5 (Colombia Standard Time)

Anzoátegui (Spanish pronunciation: [ansoˈateɣi]) is a town and municipality in the Tolima Department of Colombia. The population of the municipality was 9,700 as of the 1993 census.

The town of Anzoátegui was founded on 16 July 1895, as the village of La Palma.
