= Miguel Cané, La Pampa =

Coordinates: 36°10′S 63°30′W

Miguel Cané
- Rural locality and village
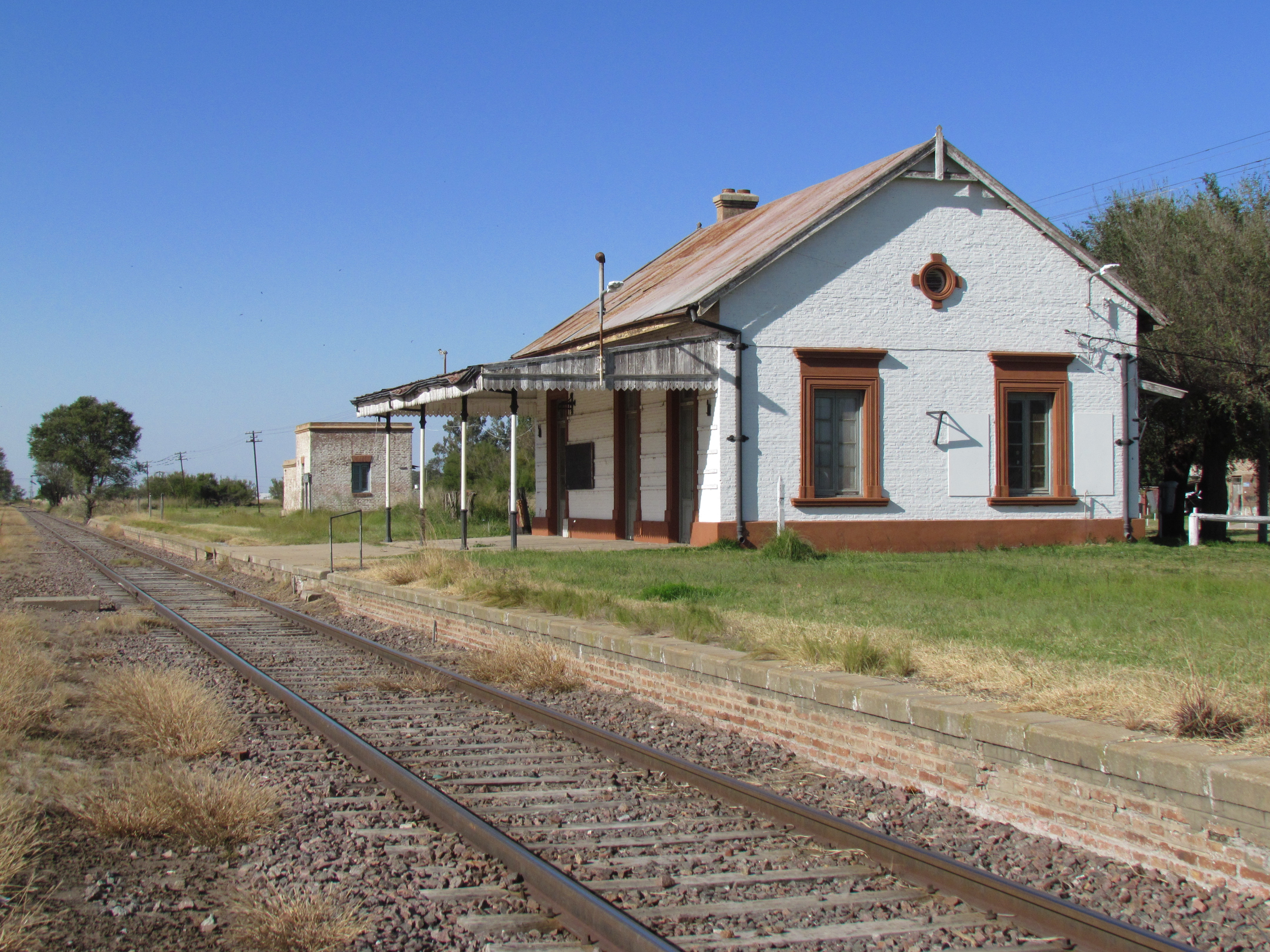
- Interactive map of Miguel Cané
- Country: Argentina
- Province: La Pampa
- Department: Quemú Quemú
- Time zone: UTC−3 (ART)

Miguel Cané is a village and rural locality (municipality) in La Pampa Province in Argentina.
