= Leubucó, La Pampa =

Coordinates: 36°53′S 63°02′W

Leubucó (Buenos Aires)
- Town
- Interactive map of Leubucó (Buenos Aires)
- Country: Argentina
- Province: La Pampa Province
- Time zone: UTC−3 (ART)

Leubucó (Buenos Aires) is a town in Buenos Aires Province in Argentina.
