= Limay Mahuida =

Coordinates: 37°12′S 66°42′W

- Rural locality and village
- Interactive map of Limay Mahuida
- Country: Argentina
- Province: La Pampa Province
- Time zone: UTC−3 (ART)

Limay Mahuida (Spanish pronunciation: [liˈmaj maˈwiða]) is a village and rural locality (municipality) in La Pampa Province in Argentina.
