= Abramo (surname) =

Abramo is a surname. People with this surname include:

- Cláudio Abramo (1923–1987), Italian-Brazilian journalist
- Jericó Abramo Masso (born 1975), Mexican politician
- Lélia Abramo (1911–2004), Italian-Brazilian actress
- Livio Abramo (1903–1993), Brazilian-Paraguayan engraver
- Perseu Abramo (1929–1996), Brazilian journalist
- Philip Abramo (born 1945), Italian-American mobster
- Sergio Abramo (born 1958), Italian politician

== See also ==
- Abramo (given name)
