= Veinticinco de Mayo, La Pampa =

Coordinates: 37.771236°S 67.717354°W

25 de Mayo
- Town
- Interactive map of 25 de Mayo
- Country: Argentina
- Province: La Pampa
- Established: 26 July 1909

Government
  - Mayor: David Edgardo

Population (2001, INDEC)
  - Total: 5,953
- Time zone: UTC−3 (ART)
- Postcode: L8201
- Area code: 0299

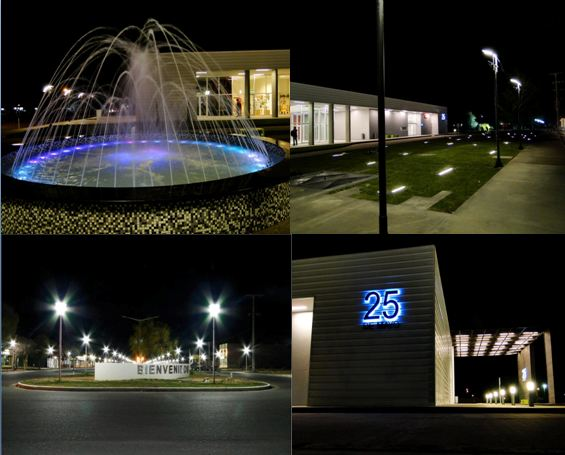
Veinticinco de Mayo, La Pampa

25 de Mayo is a town in La Pampa Province in Argentina.

== Climate ==
Climate data for Veinticinco de Mayo, La Pampa (1971–1996)
Month	Jan	Feb	Mar	Apr	May	Jun	Jul	Aug	Sep	Oct	Nov	Dec	Year
Record high °C (°F)	42.5 (108.5)	40.9 (105.6)	37.8 (100.0)	34.2 (93.6)	33.2 (91.8)	29.5 (85.1)	26.5 (79.7)	29.5 (85.1)	33.5 (92.3)	35.9 (96.6)	38.0 (100.4)	39.8 (103.6)	42.5 (108.5)
Mean daily maximum °C (°F)	31.5 (88.7)	30.3 (86.5)	27.1 (80.8)	22.4 (72.3)	17.9 (64.2)	13.2 (55.8)	13.8 (56.8)	16.6 (61.9)	19.5 (67.1)	23.0 (73.4)	27.1 (80.8)	29.9 (85.8)	22.7 (72.9)
Daily mean °C (°F)	24.2 (75.6)	23.0 (73.4)	19.6 (67.3)	14.8 (58.6)	10.5 (50.9)	6.8 (44.2)	6.7 (44.1)	8.9 (48.0)	12.0 (53.6)	15.8 (60.4)	19.8 (67.6)	22.7 (72.9)	15.4 (59.7)
Mean daily minimum °C (°F)	14.0 (57.2)	13.2 (55.8)	10.4 (50.7)	6.1 (43.0)	3.2 (37.8)	0.6 (33.1)	0.0 (32.0)	1.1 (34.0)	3.9 (39.0)	7.4 (45.3)	10.2 (50.4)	13.6 (56.5)	7.0 (44.6)
Record low °C (°F)	0.5 (32.9)	0.8 (33.4)	−3.5 (25.7)	−5.6 (21.9)	−9.0 (15.8)	−13.0 (8.6)	−11.6 (11.1)	−9.1 (15.6)	−7.9 (17.8)	−2.7 (27.1)	−2.5 (27.5)	3.6 (38.5)	−13.0 (8.6)
Average precipitation mm (inches)	24.3 (0.96)	19.0 (0.75)	32.4 (1.28)	26.5 (1.04)	7.7 (0.30)	19.4 (0.76)	12.4 (0.49)	10.4 (0.41)	21.0 (0.83)	27.0 (1.06)	27.6 (1.09)	29.1 (1.15)	255.3 (10.05)
Average relative humidity (%)	50	52	60	64	68	69	70	63	56	53	51	51	59
Percentage possible sunshine	71	72	64	55	47	44	41	54	52	59	62	68	57
Source: Secretaria de Mineria
