= Abramo (given name) =

Abramo is a given name. Notable people with the name include:

- Abramo Albini (born 1948), Italian rower
- Abramo Basevi (1818–1885), Italian musicologist and composer
- Abramo Canka (born 2002), Italian basketball player
- Abramo dall'Arpa (died 1566), Italian harpist
- Abramo Bartolommeo Massalongo (1824–1860), Italian paleobotanist and lichenologist

== See also ==
- Abramo (surname)
