= La Adela =

Coordinates: 38°59′S 64°05′W

- Rural locality and village
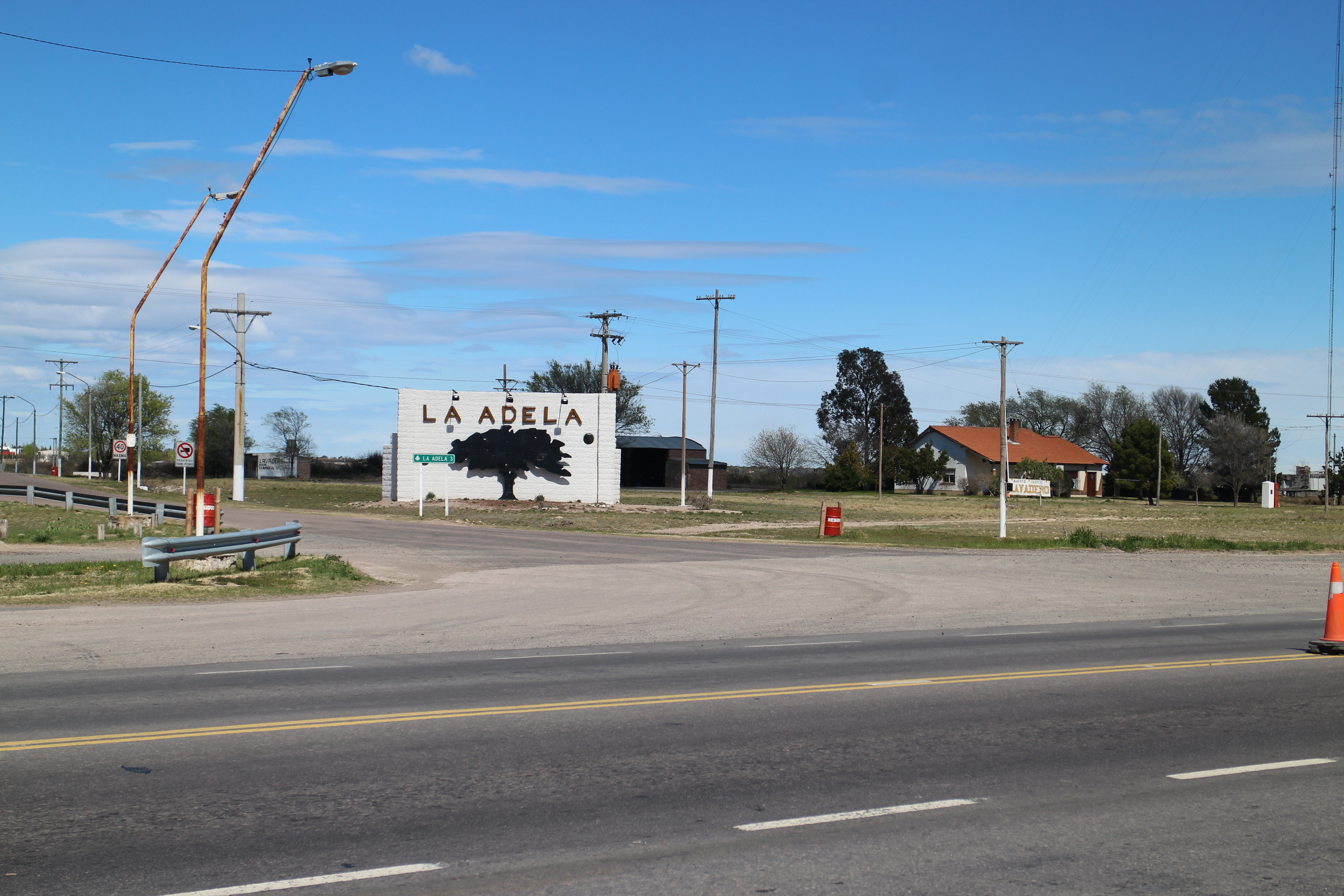
- Rural locality in Argentina
- Interactive map of La Adela
- Country: Argentina
- Province: La Pampa Province
- Time zone: UTC−3 (ART)

La Adela is a village and rural locality (municipality) in La Pampa Province in Argentina.
