= Algarrobo del Águila =

- Rural locality and village
- Location within Argentina
- Country: Argentina
- Province: La Pampa
- Department: Chical Có
- Established: 5 February 1899

Government
  - Development Commission: Pablo Raúl Bravo, FU

Area
  - Total: 1,717.5 sq mi (4,448.2 km^{2})
- Elevation: 1,001 ft (305 m)

Population (2001)
  - Total: 641
  - Density: 0.37/sq mi (0.144/km^{2})
- Demonym: aguilense
- Time zone: UTC−3 (ART)
- Postal code: L6323
- Area code: 02924

Algarrobo del Águila is a village and rural locality (municipality) in La Pampa Province in Argentina. It is the capital of the Chical Có Department, 171 km from Santa Rosa, the provincial capital of the La Pampa province, and 693 km from Buenos Aires. It is located on Provincial Route 10 and National Route 151.

== Population ==
Algarrobo del Águila had 641 inhabitants (INDEC, 2001), which represented an increase of 36.67% over the previous population of 469 inhabitants (INDEC, 1991) from the previous census.

== Toponym ==
There are two variants of whether there was a locust (algarrobo) or a caldén, in front of the police station. The Águila is a white-breasted eagle.

== History ==
Algarrobo was a land occupied by native peoples for more than six thousand years. Indeed, during that time it was a "white desert". By 1870 the Argentine Army had expelled the last native. Up to 1876, the cacique Juan José Catriel lived with his people in the region.
