= Lihuel Calel Department =

Lihuel Calel Departamento Lihuel Calel
- Department
- Country: Argentina
- Seat: Cuchillo-Có

Area
  - Total: 12,460 km^{2} (4,810 sq mi)

Population (2022)
  - Total: 443
  - Density: 0.0356/km^{2} (0.0921/sq mi)

Lihuel Calel is a department of the province of La Pampa (Argentina).
