= Hucal Department =

Coordinates: 37.9019°S 63.7433°W

Hucal Departamento Huncal
- Department
- Country: Argentina
- Seat: Bernasconi

Area
  - Total: 6,047 km^{2} (2,335 sq mi)

Population (2022)
  - Total: 7,787
  - Density: 1.288/km^{2} (3.335/sq mi)

Hucal is a department of La Pampa Province (Argentina).
