= La Pampa Province =

Province of Argentina

La Pampa
- Province
- Province of La Pampa; Provincia de La Pampa (Spanish)
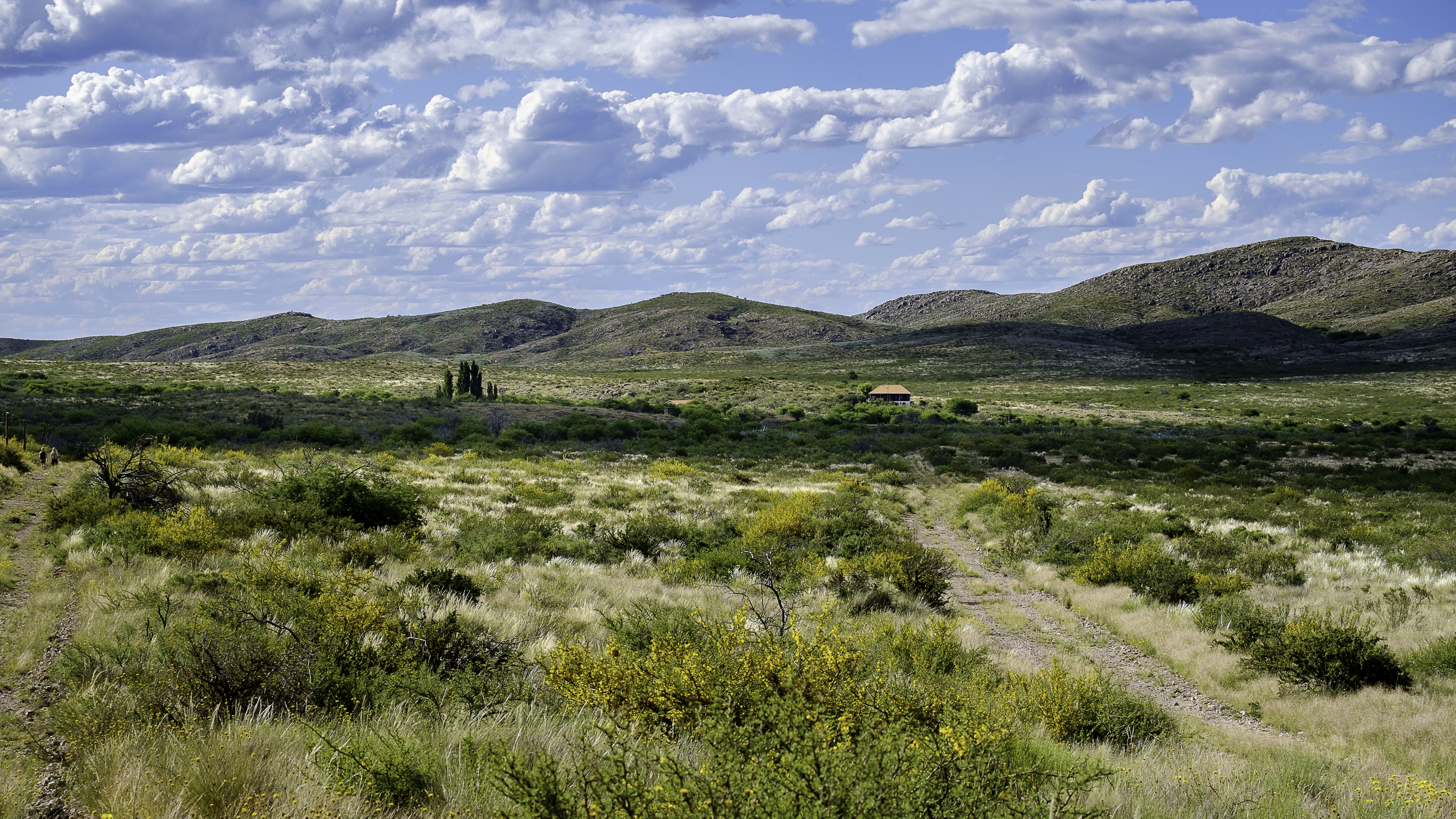
- The Lihué Calel National Park

- Flag Coat of arms

- Coordinates: 36°37′S 64°17′W
- Country: Argentina
- Capital: Santa Rosa
- Divisions: 22 departments

Government
  - Governor: Sergio Ziliotto (UxP)
  - Vice Governor: Mariano Fernandez
  - Senators: Daniel Kroneberger; María Victoria Huala; Daniel Pablo Bensusán

Area
  - Total: 143,440 km^{2} (55,380 sq mi)

Population (2022 census)
  - Total: 366,022
  - Rank: 22nd
  - Density: 2.5517/km^{2} (6.6090/sq mi)
- Demonym: Pampeano

GDP
  - Total: US$ 4.9 billion
  - Per capita: US$ 13,500
- Time zone: UTC−3 (ART)
- ISO 3166 code: AR-L
- HDI (2021): 0.861 very high (2nd)
- Website: www.lapampa.gob.ar

La Pampa (Spanish pronunciation: [la ˈpampa]) is a sparsely populated province of Argentina, located in the Pampas in the center of the country. Neighboring provinces are from the north clockwise San Luis, Córdoba, Buenos Aires, Río Negro, Neuquén and Mendoza.

== History ==
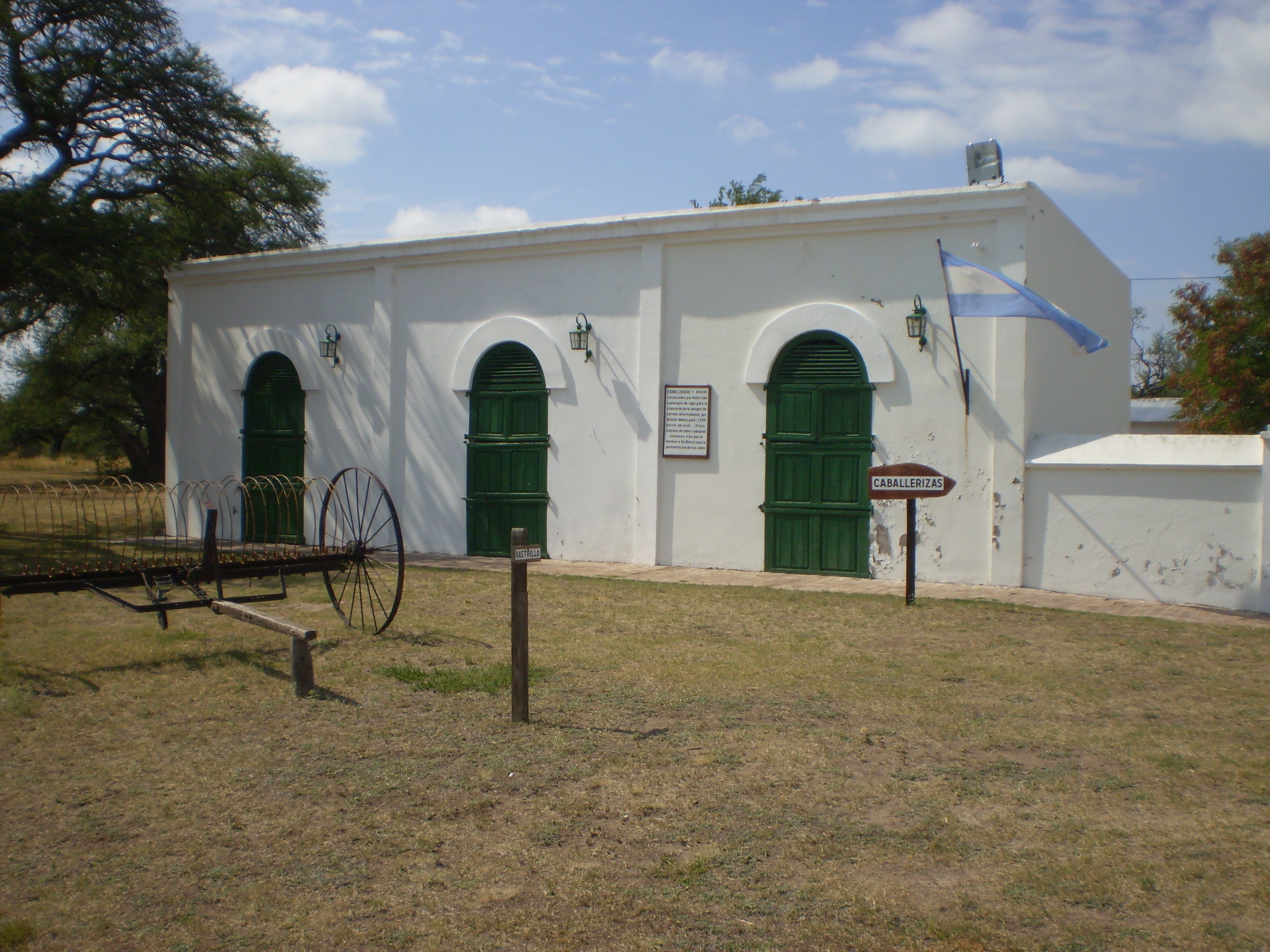
Stables at the former Roca-Luro Estate, now the Luro Prairie Preserve.

In 1604 Hernando Arias de Saavedra was the first European explorer to reach the area; it was later explored by Jerónimo Luis de Cabrera in 1662. But it was not until the 18th century that Spanish colonists established permanent settlements here.

Resistance of the local indigenous people prevented much expansion until the government of Juan Manuel de Rosas. It did not cease until Julio Roca's conquest of the desert in the 19th century. The territory was divided between the officers, and they erected the first Argentine settlements.

The Territorio Nacional de La Pampa Central was erected in 1884, containing the Río Negro Province and parts of other surrounding provinces. It had around 25,000 inhabitants. By 1915 there were 110,000 residents, a reflection of movement to that area. In 1945 the territory was divided and La Pampa became a province.

In 1952 its constitution was written and the province was renamed after Eva Peron. In 1955 after the government changed and the Peróns went into exile, both La Pampa and Chaco, which had been named for Juan Perón, were reverted to their original names.

== Geography ==
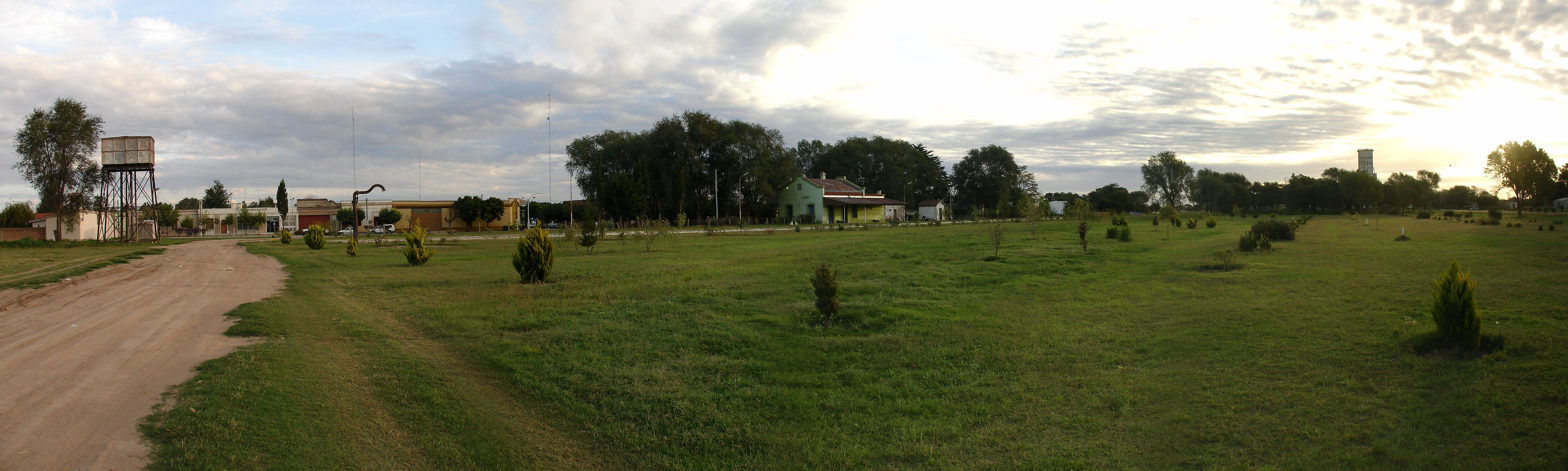
Landscape near Winifreda, La Pampa.

It is noteworthy that this province is larger than Austria, Taiwan, Ireland or Greece, for example. There are only two major rivers in the province: the Colorado ("Red River") on the border with the Province of Río Negro, and the Salado ("Salty River") crossing it. The Salado's level has been dropping, as its tributaries in the Province of Mendoza are diverted for irrigation.

The general aspect of the central-eastern part of the province is that of a plain gently tilted to the east that is dissected by valleys. The surface of the plain has a calcrete crust. The valleys of La Pampa, known as the transverse valleys (Spanish: valles transversales) are NE-SW oriented, with breadths of various kilometers and lengths of tens of kilometers. Some of the valleys host very large fossil inland dunes. Formerly functioning as windfunnels for sand at present these valleys are an ecotone region between the Dry and Humid Pampas.

While mostly flat, the province does also contains mountains like Sierra de Lihuel Calel, where a variety of landforms can be observed; these include inselbergs, flared slopes, domes, nubbins, tors, tafonis, and gnammas. Most of Sierra de Lihuel Calel is made up ignimbrite, a volcanic rock type that was violently erupted by ancient volcanoes.

=== Climate ===
Köppen climate map of La Pampa

Being located in the Pampas, the province has a cool temperate climate. In general, the province is dominated by two different types of climates: a temperate one in the east and a semi-arid one in the west. Precipitation generally decreases from east to west and from north to south. Being characterized by large thermal amplitudes, the climate of the province has continental characteristics, particularly in the west where thermal amplitudes are much larger. The general atmospheric circulation is one of the most important factors that influence the climate on a regional scale. During summer, the South Atlantic High is displaced to the southeast, which brings hot and humid air masses from the north and northeast. The South Pacific High in summer is responsible for bringing cooler air masses from the southwest which when these two contrasting air masses meet lead to precipitation occurring. In contrast, winters are dry due to the northward displacement of the South Atlantic high and the topographic barrier of the Andes north of 40^{o}S which prevents frontal systems that bring precipitation from reaching the province. Any winds from the southwest during winter bring in cold and dry weather since most of the precipitation and humidity are released in the Andes. As such, most of the precipitation occurs during summer.

==== Temperature ====
Mean annual temperatures in the province range between 14 and 16 °C (57.2 and 60.8 °F) although the thermal amplitude (difference between temperatures in the warmest and coldest months) is large. In summer, mean temperatures in the warmest month (January) range from 24 °C (75.2 °F) in the north and northeastern parts to 22 °C (71.6 °F) in the west and southwestern parts of the province. Temperatures tend to be cooler in the west owing to the higher altitudes. In winter, mean temperatures in the coldest month (July) range from 8 °C (46.4 °F) in the north to 6 °C (42.8 °F) in the west and southwest. The northern parts are the warmest parts of the province; absolute maximum temperatures can reach up to 40 to 45 °C (104.0 to 113.0 °F). The lowest temperatures ever recorded range from −10 °C (14.0 °F) in the northeast to −17 °C (1.4 °F) in the southwest.

==== Precipitation ====
One characteristic of the precipitation in the province is that most of the precipitation occurs from October to March with little precipitation during winter. Mean annual precipitation ranges from a low of 260 mm (10 in) in the southwest to 820 mm (32 in) in the northeast. Precipitation generally decreases from northeast to southwest. Most of the precipitation is caused by frontal systems. Precipitation is highly variable from year to year.

== Economy ==
La Pampa, long Argentina's most economically agricultural province, produced an estimated US$3.144 billion in output in 2006, or, US$10,504 per capita (almost 20% above the national average). Now, the GDP per capita of the province is of US$14,000.

Agriculture contributes a fourth to La Pampa's economy, the most important activity being cattle ranching, with 3,632,684 (2002) head, which takes place all over the province. Other livestock include 202,428 sheep, 140,498 goats and 64,118 pigs.

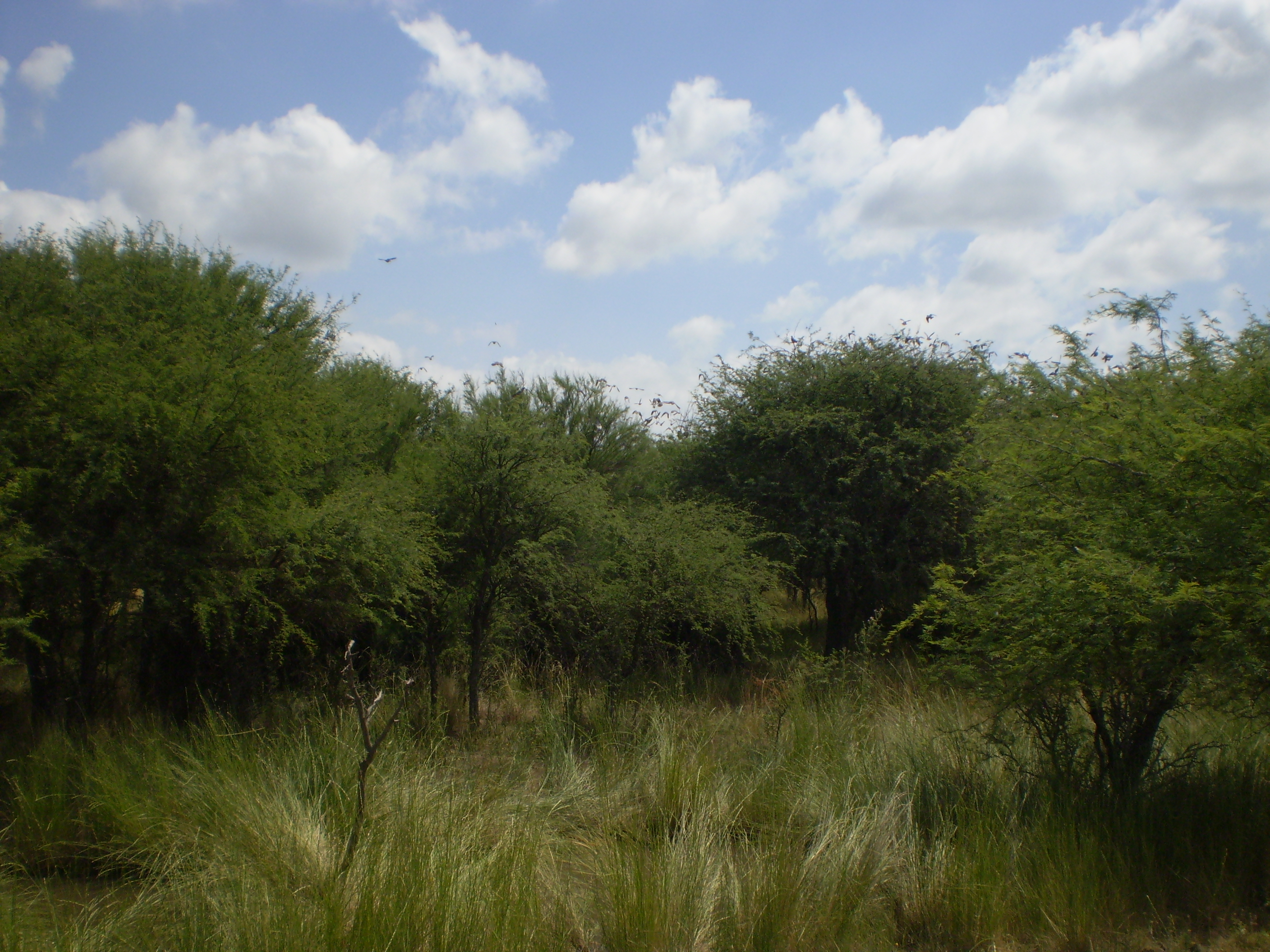
Parque Luro Natural Prairie Preserve.

The Northeast, on the more fertile lands, has also an important activity with wheat (10% of the national production), sunflower (13% of NP), maize, alfalfa, barley, and other cereals.

There's also a dairy industry of 300 centres of extraction and 25 cheese factories, honey production, and salt extraction from salt basins.

La Pampa is home to hundreds of oil and gas wells, as well as deposits of sodium chloride, sodium sulfate, and copper. Tourism is an underdeveloped activity, however. Visitors start at Santa Rosa and reach Lihué Calel National Park, Parque Luro Provincial Reserve or visit one of the many estancias, some of which are dedicated to agritourism.

== Government ==
The provincial government is divided into the usual three branches: the executive, headed by a popularly elected governor, who appoints the cabinet; the legislative; and the judiciary, headed by the Supreme Court.

The Constitution of La Pampa Province forms the formal law of the province.

In Argentina, the most important law enforcement organization is the Argentine Federal Police but the additional work is carried out by the La Pampa Provincial Police.

== Political divisions ==
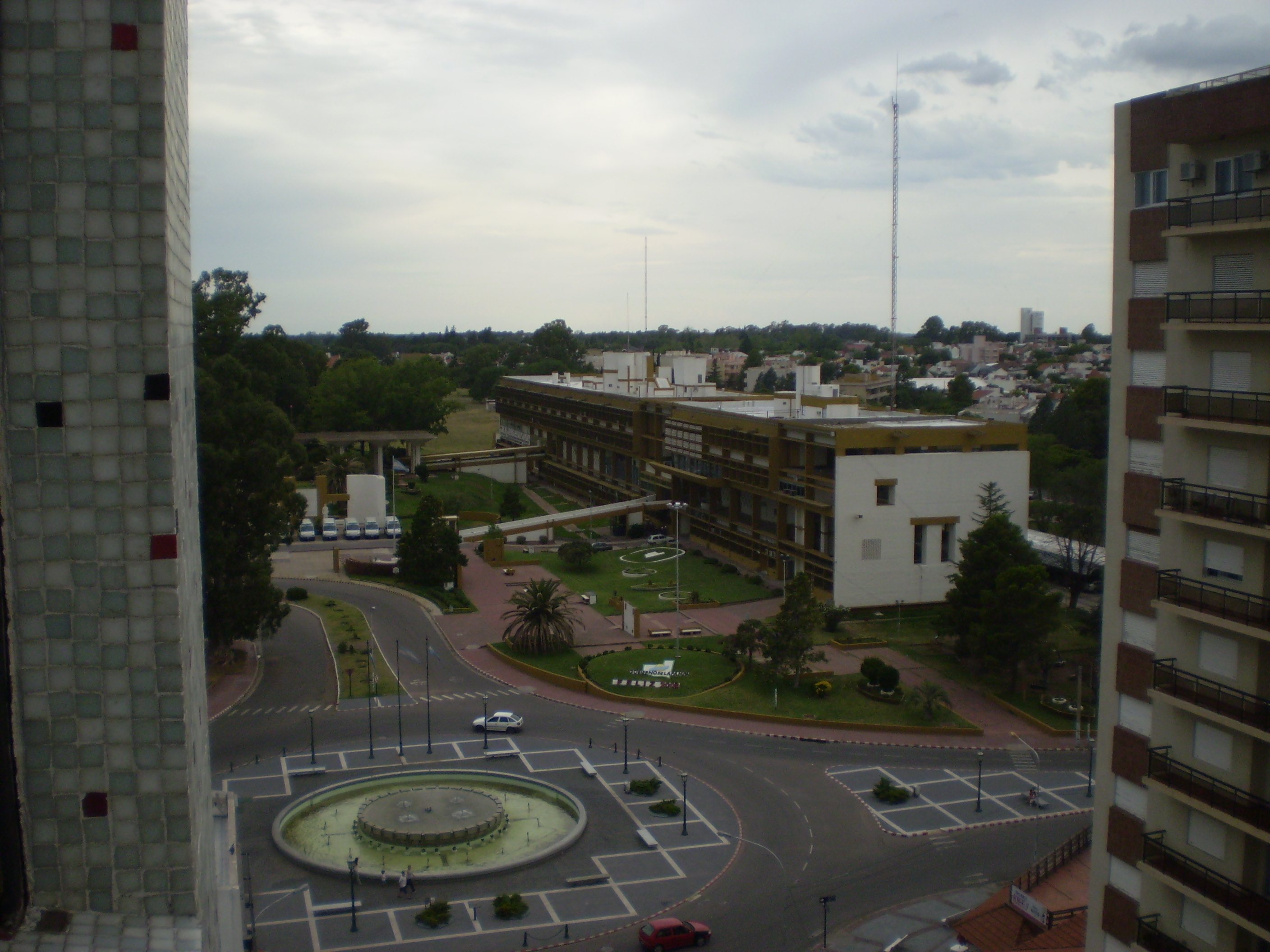
Civic Center and governor's offices, Santa Rosa.

The province is divided in 22 departments (Spanish: departamentos).

Department (Capital)

1. Atreuco Department (Macachín)
2. Caleu Caleu Department (La Adela)
3. Capital (Santa Rosa)
4. Catriló Department (Catriló)
5. Chalileo Department (Santa Isabel)
6. Chapaleufú Department (Intendente Alvear)
7. Chical Có Department (Algarrobo del Aguila)
8. Conhelo Department (Eduardo Castex)
9. Curacó Department (Puelches)
10. Guatraché Department (Guatraché)
11. Hucal Department (Bernasconi)
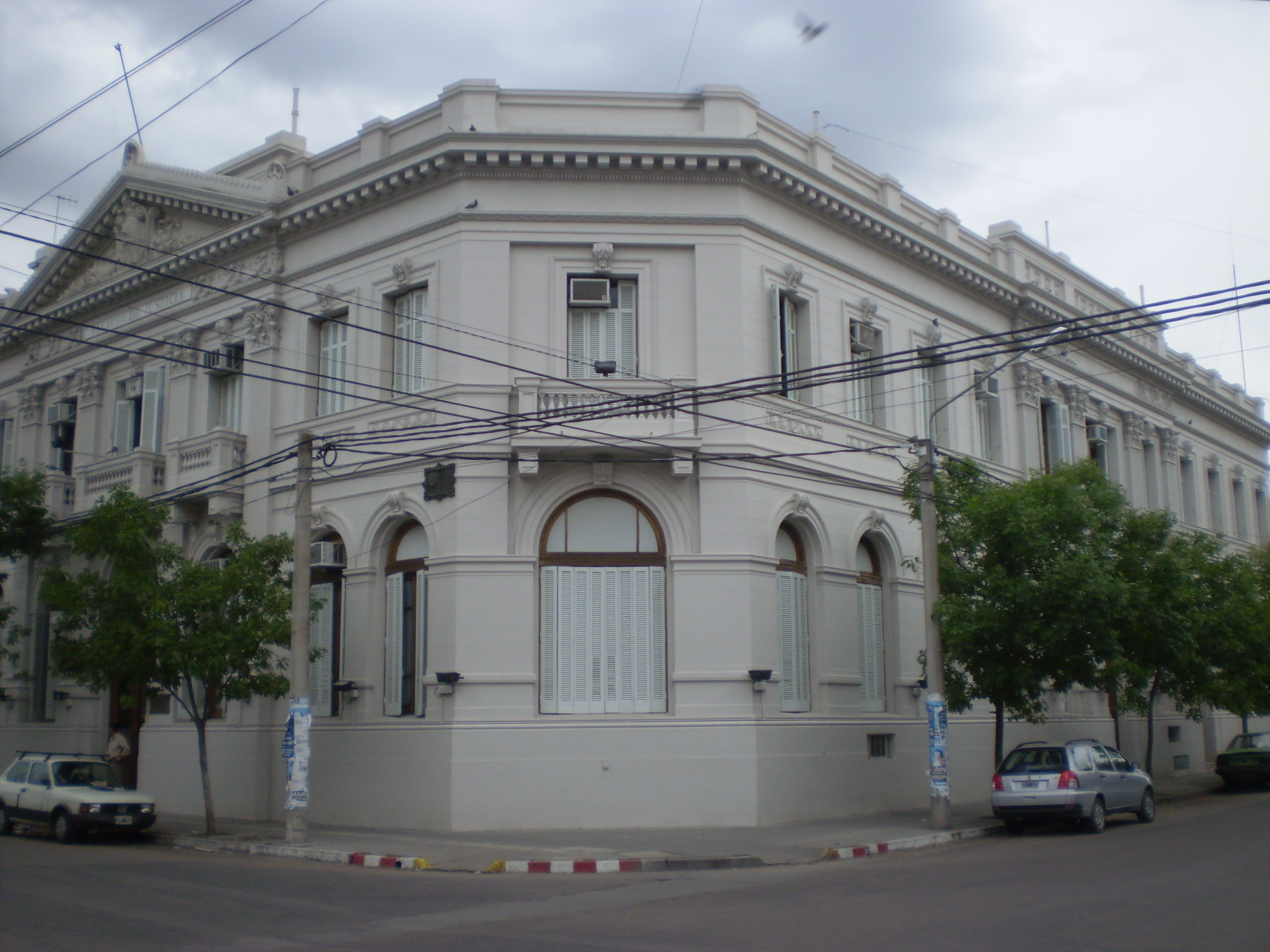
  Supreme Court of La Pampa.
12. Lihuel Calel Department (Cuchillo-Có)
13. Limay Mahuida Department (Limay Mahuida)
14. Loventué Department (Victorica)
15. Maracó Department (General Pico)
16. Puelén Department (Veinticinco de Mayo)
17. Quemú Quemú Department (Quemú Quemú)
18. Rancul Department (Parera)
19. Realicó Department (Realicó)
20. Toay Department (Toay)
21. Trenel Department (Trenel)
22. Utracán Department (General Acha)

== Villages ==
- Abramo
- Agustoni
- Ceballos
- Conhelo
- Coronel Hilario Lagos
- Dorila
- General Manuel Campos
- La Gloria, village and rural locality (municipality)
- Leubucó, town
- Luan Toro, village and rural locality (municipality)
- Mauricio Mayer, village and rural locality (municipality)
- Metileo, village and rural locality (municipality)
- Miguel Cané, village and rural locality (municipality)
- Monte Nievas, village and rural locality (municipality)
- Naicó, village and rural locality (municipality)
- Ojeda
- Pichi Huinca
- Relmo, village and rural locality (municipality)
- Tomás Manuel de Anchorena
