= Pilagá =

Indigenous people of Argentina

pit´laxá
- The Pilagá people's flag

Total population
- 5,137 (2010)

Regions with significant populations
- Argentina

Languages
- Pilagá

Related ethnic groups
- Mocoví, Toba, Kadiwéu

The Pilagá (Pilagá: pit'laxá) are an Indigenous people of the Guaycuru group that inhabits the center of the province of Formosa, in Argentina. Some migrant groups also live in the provinces of Chaco and Santa Fe.

Their language is part of the Mataco-Guaicurú linguistic family. They are closely related to the Toba people, and about 2000 of them speak their own language, along with the Spanish language. Since 1996, they have been writing Pilagá in a Latin alphabet of 4 vowels and 19 consonants.

They have been able to preserve much of their native culture. They are of tall stature and strong build. In ancient times, they were hunters and gatherers. Among the fruits they gathered were those of the carob tree, chañar, mistol, prickly pear, and molle.

== History ==
The first historical records of the Pilagás date back to the 17th century, when they inhabited the Eastern area of the provinces of Chaco and Formosa on the Paraguay River, along with other groups such as the Abipón, the Mocoví, and the Toba. The Guarani of Paraguay called these peoples “frentones”, because of their custom of shaving the front of their heads. They were frequently confused with the Toba of the West, with whom they are historically related, both linguistically and culturally, as well as by military alliances and family relations. During the 17th century, the Guaycuru expanded westward through Southern and Central Chaco in continuous wars with Mataco-Mataguayan groups. The expansion stopped in the middle of the 18th century, due to the Spanish military pressure that displaced them from the Bermejo River, placing the Pilagá in the marshlands between the Pilcomayo and Paraguay rivers at the end of the 18th century, up to the area of Fortín Yunká to the west and the middle of the province of Formosa to the south.

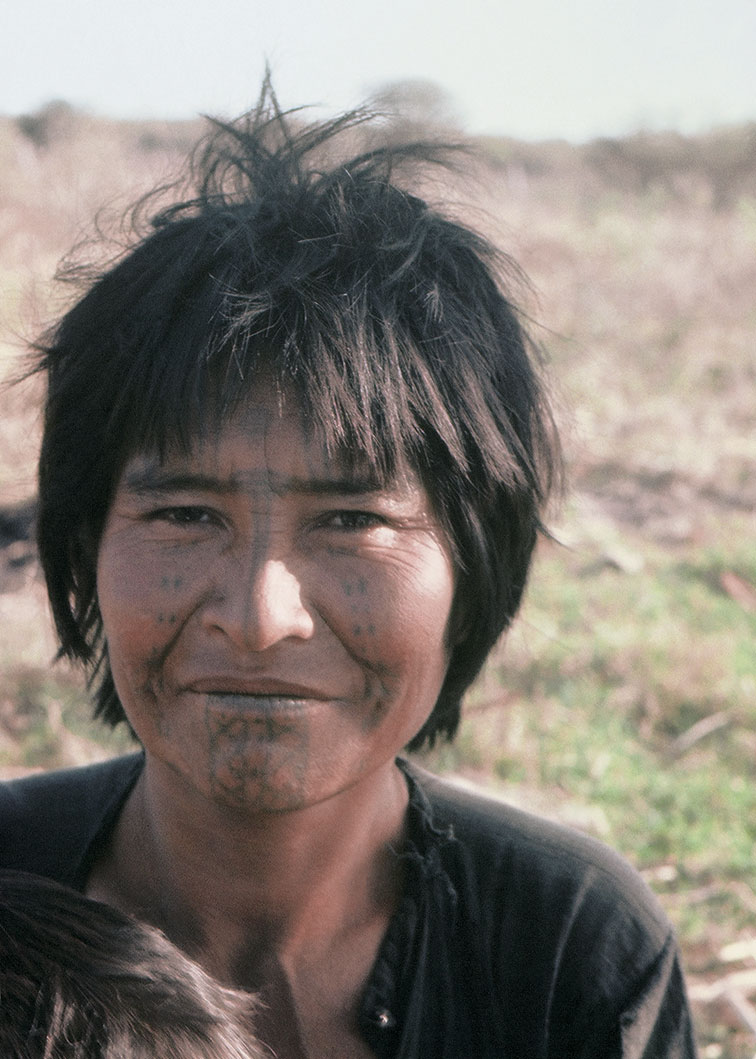
Pilagá woman with traditional tattoos, by Grete Stern

At the end of the Paraguayan War (1864–1870), Argentina began the occupation of the Southern and Central Chaco, creating the Chaco Governorate in 1872, which was divided in 1884, leaving the Pilagá within the area assigned to the National Territory of Formosa. After successive expansive campaigns, on September 1, 1899, General Lorenzo Vintter began a military campaign in command of 1700 men that took the borderline to the Pilcomayo River, concluding with the effective military occupation of the Argentine Chaco. The Pilagá and other peoples' lands were occupied by settlers, and the indigenous people who survived the war and the diseases new to them were taken to cotton plantations and sugar mills, as auxiliaries of the military forces or deported as prisoners to Martín García Island. Many women and children were sent to work as servants for families in urban centers. From the beginning of the 20th century, the remaining Pilagá moved towards the interior of the province of Formosa, and some settled in the city of Formosa. This caused them to differentiate into two groups: the “del bañado”, located in the west, and the “de Navagán”, in the east.

In 1901, the government of Julio Argentino Roca made an agreement with the Franciscan Order of the San Carlos Borromeo convent in San Lorenzo (Santa Fe) regarding the foundation of two indigenous reductions in the National Territory of Formosa, one of which was the mission of San Francisco Solano de Tacaaglé. It was founded by the Franciscan Terencio Marcucci on March 21, 1901, with 150 Toba and Pilagá, mostly coming from the Paraguayan Chaco Boreal. It occupied 20,000 hectares of land near the Pilcomayo River, within which it was moved several times. When Formosa was provincialized in 1955, the mission passed to civilian control, becoming the town of Misión Tacaaglé.

The massacre of Fortín Yunká, also known as “the last malón”, which took place on March 19, 1919, against members of the Argentine Army, was initially attributed to Pilagá groups. Fifteen people were killed: the chief and the military garrison of the fortín, and members of their families. As a consequence of subsequent reprisals carried out by Argentine troops, an undetermined number of indigenous people were killed or displaced from their original territories. Subsequent investigations suggest that the perpetrators were Maká groups from Paraguay.

On April 1, 2005, the Pilagá Federation filed a civil lawsuit against the National State in the Federal Court of Formosa, claiming financial compensation for the massacre of the Pilagá people that occurred in October 1947, known as the Rincón Bomba massacre, carried out during the first presidential term of Juan Domingo Perón, which was declared a crime against humanity.

== Population ==
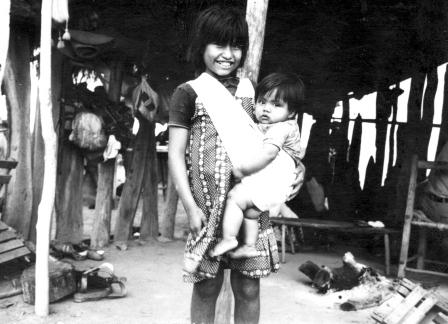
Pilagá children in Formosa, Argentina

The 2004-2005 Complementary Survey of Indigenous Peoples (ECPI), complementary to the 2001 National Census of Population, Homes, and Dwellings of Argentina, resulted in 4465 people in Argentina (3867 of which resided in communities) recognized and/or descended in first generation from the Pilagá people, of which 3948 lived in the province of Formosa and 517 in the rest of the country.

In 2010, the National Population Census in Argentina revealed that 5,137 people recognized themselves as Pilagá throughout the country, 4366 of whom resided in the province of Formosa.

== Communities ==
Since 1995, the National Institute of Indigenous Affairs (INAI) began to recognize legal status through registration in the National Registry of Indigenous Communities (Renaci) to indigenous communities in Argentina, including 17 Pilagá communities in the Patiño department of the province of Formosa:

- Pilagá Chaabolek' Laurepi Community (on August 13, 2009)
- Comunidad Pilaga Qomlase La Esperanza Pilagá (on October 9, 2009)
- Aborigen Kilómetro 30 Lote 24 Aboriginal Community Association (on November 17, 2011)
- Qacheyein Aboriginal Community (on November 17, 2011)
- La Invernada Aboriginal Community (on August 10, 2011)
- Ayo Aboriginal Community (on August 10, 2011)
- Cacique Coquero Aboriginal Community (August 1, 2011)
- Ceferino Namuncurá Aboriginal Community (August 10, 2011)
- Chico Dawagan Aboriginal Community (on September 12, 2011)
- El Ensanche Aboriginal Community (on October 27, 2011)
- Juan Bautista Alberdi Aboriginal Community (September 12, 2011)
- Laqtasanyi Pilagá Km 14 (July 22, 2011)
- Aboriginal Community Lote 21 (on September 12, 2011)
- Nelagady Aboriginal Community (on September 32, 2011)
- Pozo Molina (Qanaitq) Aboriginal Community (on September 19, 2011)
- Qompi Juan Sosa Aboriginal Community (on November 21, 2011)
- Yancoudi Aboriginal Community (on November 4, 2011)

== Community representation ==
In 2004, INAI created the Council of Indigenous Participation (CPI), reformulated in 2008, orienting its functions towards tasks of accompaniment and strengthening of the communities. It is composed of representatives elected in community assemblies by town and by province, but not in the province of Formosa, where the representatives of each of the three indigenous peoples recognized in the province — Wichí, Qom, and Pilagá — are the same as those who make up the board of the Institute of Aboriginal Communities, elected by the communities for the provincial level.

On December 19, 2011, the INAI registered the Federation of Indigenous Communities of the Pilagá People in the National Registry of Indigenous Peoples' Organizations (Renopi). This federation groups the Pilagá communities of the province of Formosa and is made up of an executive triumvirate elected in assembly and three councils: Council of Women, Council of Representatives, and Council of Elders.
