= Chorro =

Chorro may refer to:

- El Chorro, a village in Malaga, Andalusia, Spain
- El Chorro, Formosa, farm village in the Formosa province, Argentina
- El Chorro, Uruguay, a resort in the Maldonado Department, Uruguay
- Rancho El Chorro, a Mexican land grant in California (1845)

== See also ==
- Choro
