= Villa General Güemes =

Coordinates: 24°45′19″S 59°29′22″W

- Interactive map of Villa General Güemes
- Country: Argentina
- Province: Formosa Province
- Time zone: UTC−3 (ART)
- Climate: Cfa

Villa General Güemes is a settlement in northern Argentina. It is located in Formosa Province.
