= Herradura, Formosa =

Coordinates: 26°29′S 58°18′W

Herradura (Formosa)
- Interactive map of Herradura (Formosa)
- Country: Argentina
- Province: Formosa Province
- Time zone: UTC−3 (ART)
- Climate: Cfa

Herradura (Formosa) is a settlement in northern Argentina. It is located in Formosa Province.
