= Rincón Bomba massacre =

1947 massacre in Argentina

Rincón Bomba Massacre
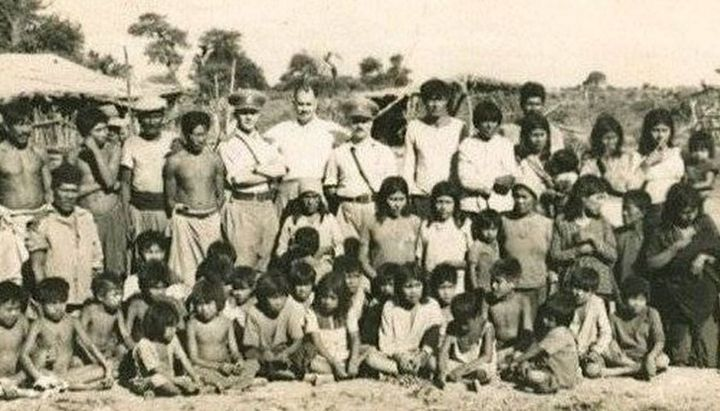
- National Gendarmerie agents posing with kidnapped Pilagá children and adolescents during the massacre
- Location: 24°41′27″S 60°35′05″W; La Bomba Hamlet, Las Lomitas, Formosa, Argentina
- Date: October 10–30, 1947
- Target: Pilagá people
- Attack type: Shootings, rapes, aerial attack, and enslavement
- Weapons: Pistols, rifles, machine guns, ground attack aircraft
- Deaths: 1,200–2,000
- Perpetrators: National Gendarmerie; Argentine Air Force
- Motive: Genocide (judicially classified as such in 2020)
- Accused: Carlos Smachetti (indicted), Leandro Santos Costas (charged), Emilio Fernández Castellanos, José M. Aliaga Pueyrredón, Néstor Leoncio Perloff, Edmundo Zalazar, Francisco Bagardi, Isabelino Ezcurra, Abelardo Sergio Como (see section Perpetrators, suspects, and participants)

The Rincón Bomba Massacre, also known as the Pilagá Massacre, La Bomba Massacre, Pilagá Genocide, or Rincón Bomba, was a genocide and crime against humanity committed by the Argentine state against Indigenous peoples in 1947. The National Gendarmerie, with support from an Argentine Air Force aircraft and National Territories Police, targeted the Pilagá people in La Bomba Hamlet, near Las Lomitas, in what was then the National Territory of Formosa (now Formosa Province), between October 10 and 30, 1947, during the first presidency of Juan Perón. The atrocities included executions, disappearances, torture, rape, kidnappings, and forced labor, with an estimated 750 to 1,000 deaths.

In 2019, the event was judicially recognized as a crime against humanity, and in 2020, it was classified as a genocide. The massacre was largely unaddressed by the state and mainstream Argentine society for decades, preserved only in the Pilagá people's oral memory. In 2005, the Pilagá People's Federation sued the Argentine state, securing judicial recognition and the state's obligation to commemorate the event and provide moral and material reparations.

== Background ==
The Pilagá people are an indigenous group in present-day Argentina, historically inhabiting the southern and central Gran Chaco plain. They resisted Spanish colonization of the Americas and remained independent until the late 19th century, after the Spanish American wars of independence expelled Spanish forces from most of the Americas.

In the late 1860s, the Argentine state launched conquest campaigns against indigenous peoples in Patagonia and the Gran Chaco, known as the Conquest of the Desert. In 1917, President Hipólito Yrigoyen of the Radical Civic Union (UCR) declared the conquest of Chaco complete, though military and "pacification" operations persisted for decades. Defeated Gran Chaco peoples were subjected to forced labor in the national territories of Chaco and Formosa, where residents lacked voting rights. Some scholars classify this dispossession as a genocide.

Notable atrocities include the Napalpí Massacre of 1924, where police under Governor Fernando Centeno, supervised by President Marcelo Torcuato de Alvear (UCR), killed 500 to 1,000 Qom and Mocoví people.

The 1994 constitutional reform recognized indigenous peoples' pre-existence and rights to ancestral lands and culture, but many provinces have yet to return these territories, often held by large landowners or private companies.

In 1936, the massacre with similar characteristics occurred in Oberá, Misiones Province, targeted Russian, Ukrainian, and Polish immigrants labeled "stateless." Initially attributed to "communist elements" by police, investigations in the 21st century confirmed police responsibility.

== Events ==
=== El Tabacal: mass layoffs and migration ===
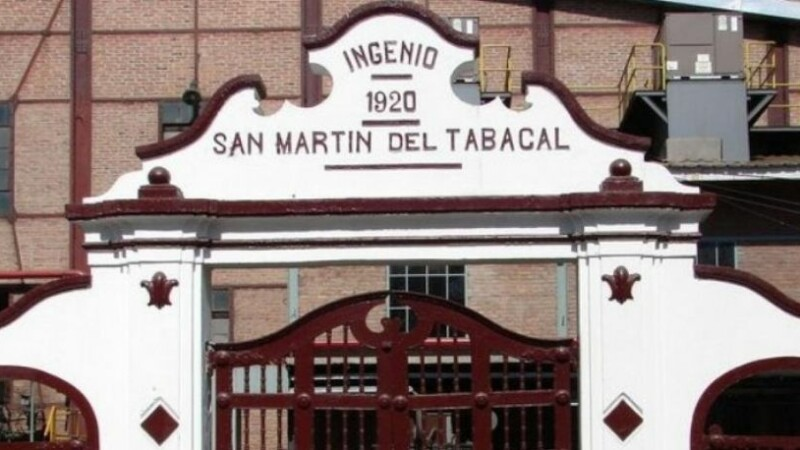
In May 1947, El Tabacal Sugar Mill, owned by politician and businessman Robustiano Patrón Costas, dismissed hundreds of indigenous workers after breaching payment agreements.

In late April 1947, hundreds of Qom, Pilagá, Mocoví, Chorote, and Wichí families from the National Territory of Formosa were hired by El Tabacal Sugar Mill in Salta Province for the sugarcane harvest starting in May. Workers traveled hundreds of kilometers on foot. The company paid only 2.50 pesos per day instead of the agreed 6 pesos, prompting protests. In response, all contracted workers were dismissed.

This left the workers without resources, forcing a mass migration to Las Lomitas, a town in Formosa 450 kilometers from El Tabacal, where the 18th National Gendarmerie Squadron was stationed. They arrived in mid-May.

At the time, Formosa was governed by Rolando de Hertelendy, a landowner appointed by President Perón in 1946, who faced opposition from locals and the Peronist press for alleged oligarchic ties.

=== Arrival in Las Lomitas ===
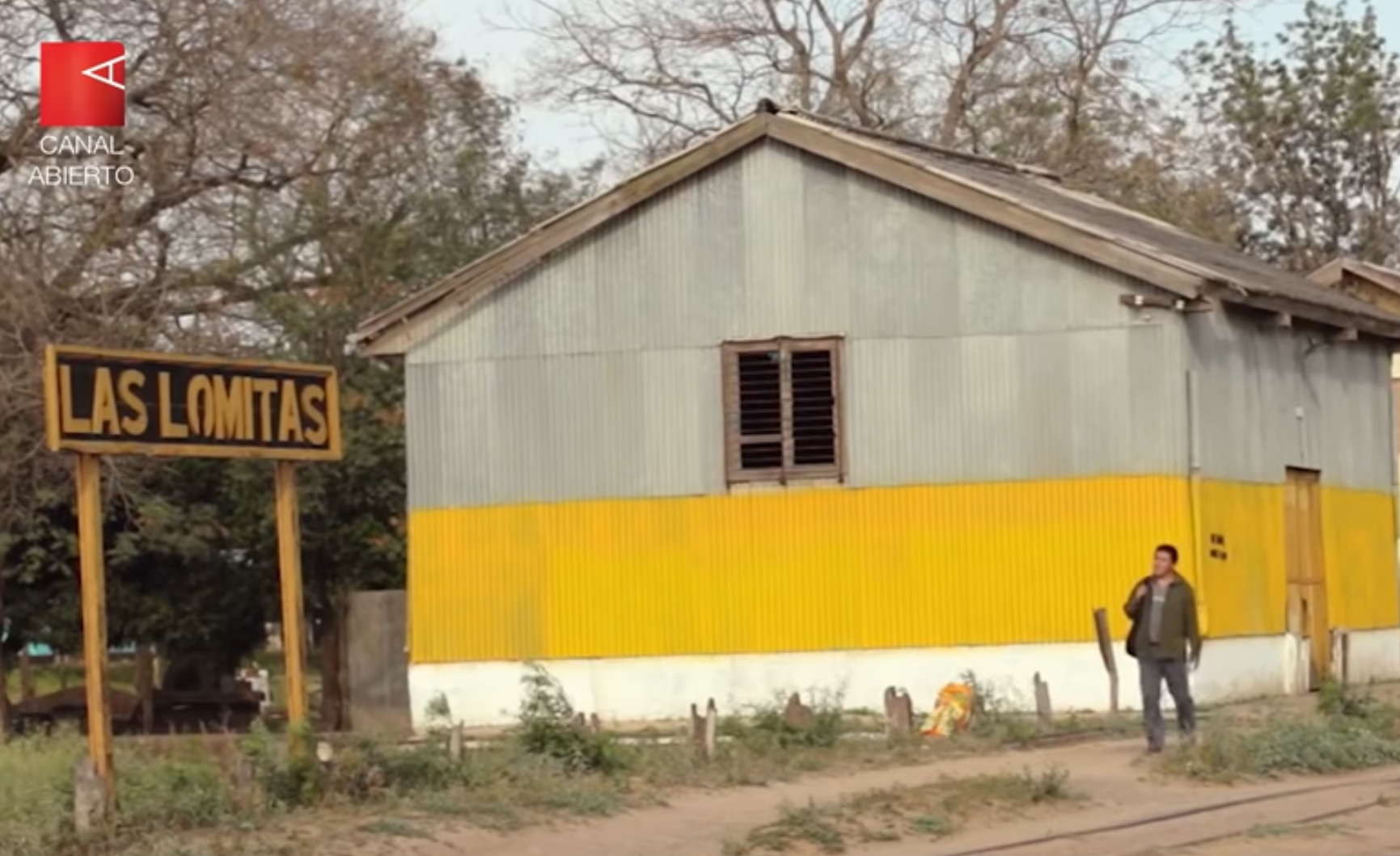
Train station in Las Lomitas, 2018

In mid-May, a large group settled in Rincón Bomba, or La Bomba, near Las Lomitas, in an area crossed by a dry ravine known locally as a "madrejón." Led by healer Tonkiet (Luciano Córdoba) and caciques Oñedie (Paulo "Pablito" Navarro) and Nola Lagadick, the group grew as more indigenous people arrived, drawn by Tonkiet's healing acts. Estimates of the population range from 1,000 to several thousand.

Initially, the local population and the Gendarmerie Squadron, led by Emilio Fernández Castellanos, showed support. However, tensions rose over time between the local "white" residents and the indigenous group.

Every afternoon, the group sang, danced, and played drums until dawn, with music audible from afar. The presence of unfamiliar families, children hunting frogs, and stray dogs disrupted life in Las Lomitas.

— Mapelman 2015:99

The situation worsened as many suffered from malnutrition, with three deaths reported, including the mother of cacique Pablito. In September, Governor Rolando de Hertelendy informed Minister of the Interior Ángel Borlenghi, who notified President Perón. Perón ordered three train cars of food, clothing, and medicine sent to Formosa. The cargo, under the responsibility of Miguel Ortiz of the National Directorate of Indigenous Affairs, arrived in late September, but two-thirds spoiled due to delays in delivery.

=== Escalation ===
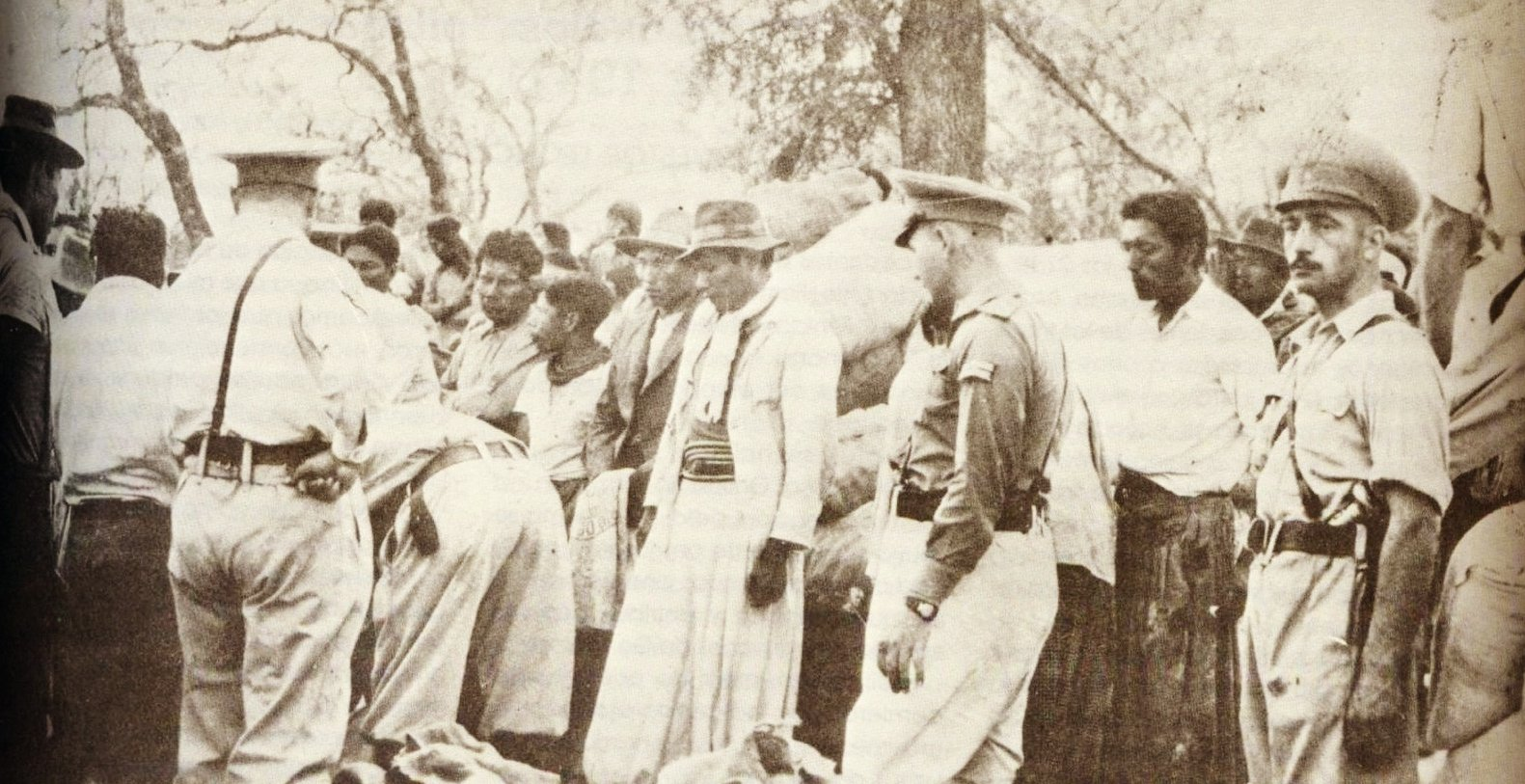
The National Gendarmerie meets with the Pilagá community at Rincón Bomba before the massacre. In the center, wearing white trousers, is cacique Pablito Navarro, with healer Luciano Córdoba to his right.

Spoiled food caused mass poisoning, killing at least 50 people, mostly children and elders, in early October. Many believed the food was deliberately poisoned. Tonkiet's influence grew, with extended rituals intensifying local rejection, including opposition to burying the dead in the town cemetery.

Children roamed Las Lomitas begging for food, and residents grew frustrated with the noise and gatherings. They questioned why so many had come to a place with little to offer.

— Survivor Salqoe, Mapelman 2015:102

Local press fueled fears of an indigenous "malón" (raid), prompting residents to demand action. Commander Fernández Castellanos responded by establishing a security cordon of about 100 gendarmes around the camp, with four machine gun nests, and confiscated the group's weapons.

A 1991 Gendarmerie publication included testimonies from four gendarmes, revealing prevalent racism:

These Indians were almost like savages, animals. And not even animals should be mistreated.

=== The massacre ===
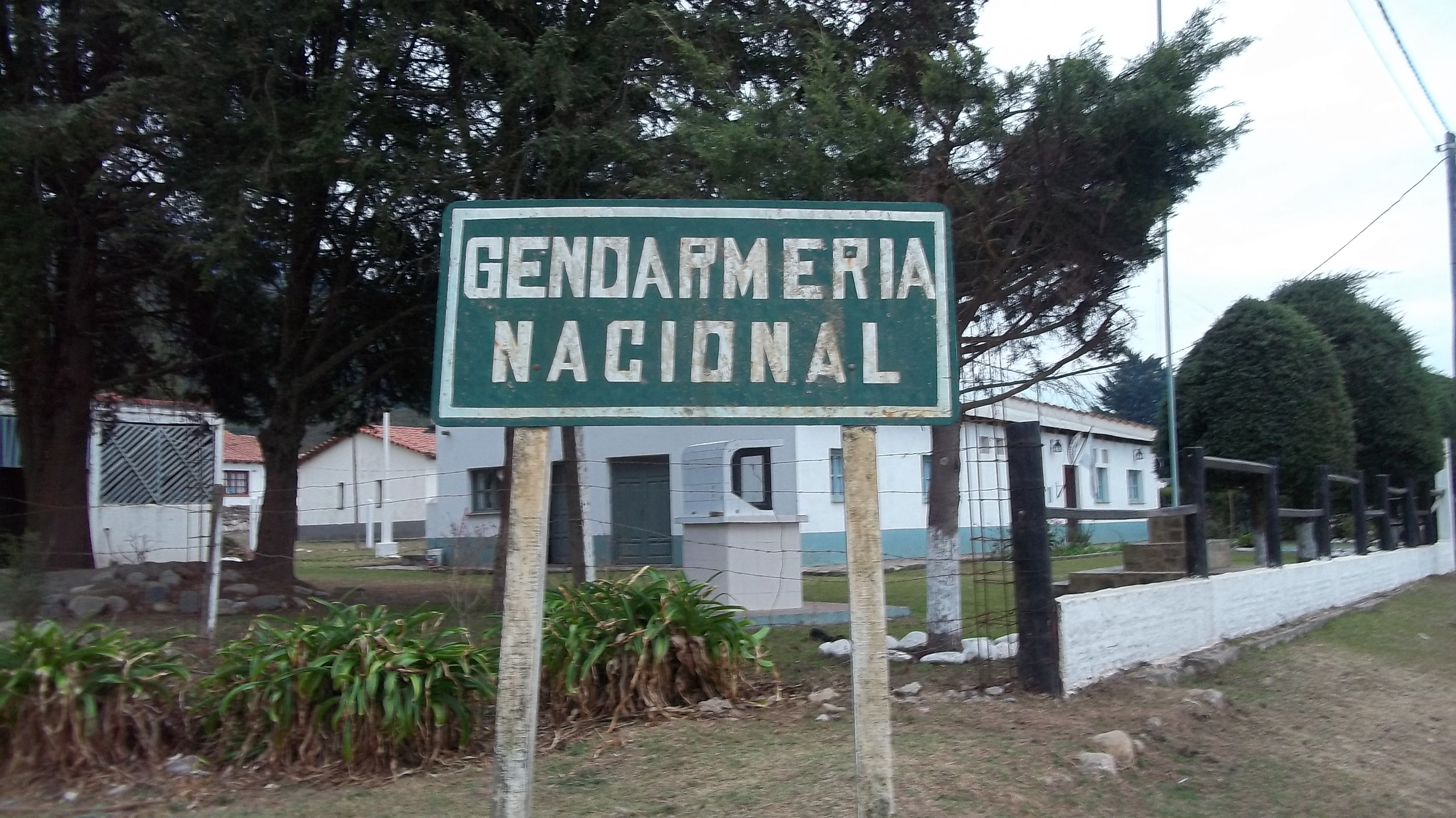
The 18th National Gendarmerie Squadron in Las Lomitas led the Rincón Bomba Massacre.

On October 10, gendarmes prepared to attack the Pilagá camp. Children working in the squadron’s kitchen were warned by gendarmes:

Corporal Londero told me to warn my parents that the weapons were ready. 'Tell them to pack and leave to avoid being shot. Return here, and I’ll hide you.'

— Setkokie’n (Melitón Domínguez), Mapelman 2015:139

That afternoon, cacique Pablito requested a meeting with Fernández Castellanos, arranged by Gendarme Teófilo Ramón Cruz in an open field with 200–400 gendarmes present. At around 6:00 p.m., Pablito approached, followed by men, women, and children carrying portraits of Perón and Eva Perón.

Gunfire erupted from machine guns, carbines, and pistols. Fernández Castellanos ordered a ceasefire, unaware that second-in-command José M. Aliaga Pueyrredón had secretly deployed additional machine guns across the ravine. Survivor Ni’daciye recalled:

Around 6 or 7 p.m., soldiers began shooting. Children, women, and elders fell. A woman carrying her baby was shot in the neck. I saw many die but remained calm.

— Ni’daciye, Mapelman 2015:146

Victims included "grandmother Guamaena," "grandmother Neeto," "grandmother Pochaae," Sehent, Qetee (Susana), Lichee, Meto, and Quemana. Killings continued for weeks, with over 750 deaths from wounds, thirst, hunger, and further shootings. Rape was used as a weapon, targeting adults and children.

Survivors reported executions and burnings in Campo del Cielo, Pozo del Tigre, and other sites, with 400–500 killed, plus 200 disappeared and 50 poisoned. Naeron (Pedro) testified that his uncles were shot and burned at Pozo Pilagá. Ketae saw elders burned alive near Pozo del Tigre. A local witness reported two Pilagá couples shot and burned while alive. Seecho’le (Norma Navarrete) witnessed Aliaga Pueyrredón rape a 14-year-old girl in exchange for sparing her group.

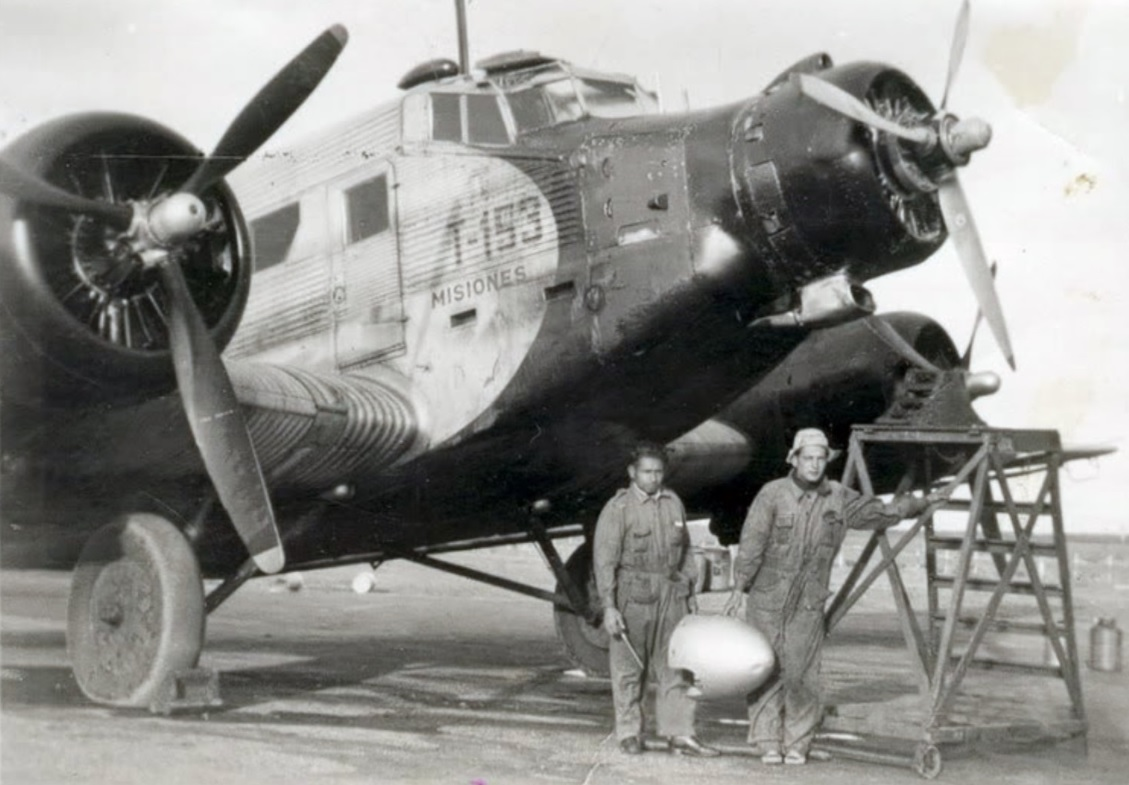
The Argentine Air Force Junkers Ju 52 used in the massacre, machine-gunning the Pilagá from October 15–23.

From October 15 to 23, a Junkers Ju 52 aircraft (T-153) equipped with a 7.65mm Colt machine gun joined the repression, operating from Las Lomitas. The Northern Zone Gendarmerie Commander, Julio Cruz Villafañe, was aboard.

A 2005 investigation identified a 40-km "trail of death" from Rincón Bomba’s mass grave to La Felicidad Hamlet, kilometer 30, and Muñiz Colony. Captured survivors were sent to indigenous colonies in Francisco Muñiz and Bartolomé de las Casas, subjected to forced labor under Gendarmerie oversight.

On October 16, Gendarmerie Director Natalio Faverio reported Ensign Leandro Santos Costa was wounded in an alleged indigenous attack, with fifteen indigenous deaths, but provided no names or burial details.

=== Cover-up ===
On October 11, a confidential Ministry of the Interior document reported an indigenous "uprising," followed by troop mobilization. National newspapers, including La Nación, La Prensa, and Noticias Gráficas, labeled it a "malón," alleging the Pilagá used firearms and killed a "Christian" woman. Only El Intransigente reported rumors of a Gendarmerie cover-up. The event was largely ignored until the 21st century.

== Legal proceedings ==
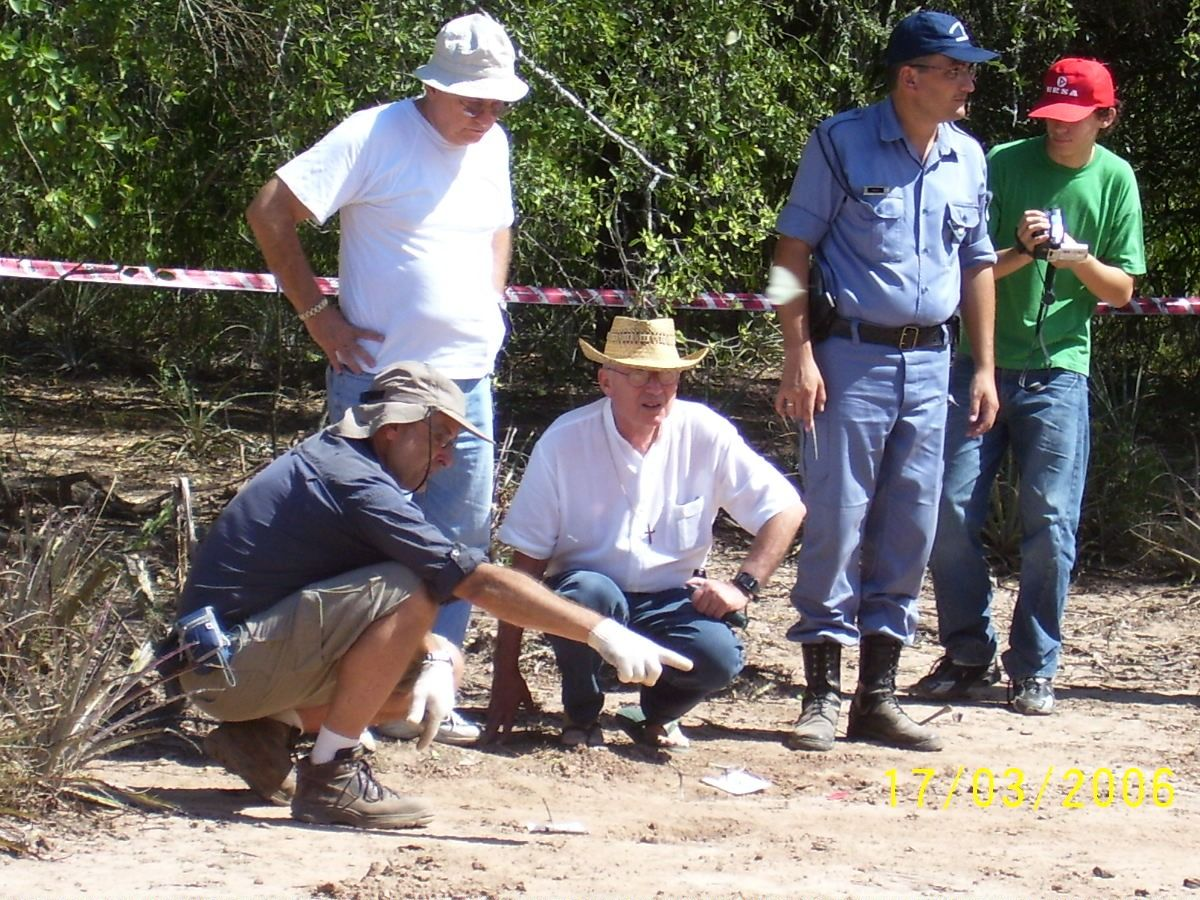
Forensic experts uncover mass graves in Rincón Bomba, March 2006.

In June 2005, the Pilagá Federation filed criminal and civil lawsuits against the Argentine state for crimes against humanity, genocide, and reparations. The criminal case closed due to the accused's deaths. The civil case succeeded in 2019 and 2020, with an appeal to the Supreme Court over land return and reparations amounts.

=== Lawsuit ===
On April 1, 2005, the Pilagá Federation demanded state acknowledgment of the 1947 events, including truth disclosure, a declaratory judgment, a public apology, victim commemorations, accurate historical records, and preventive policies.

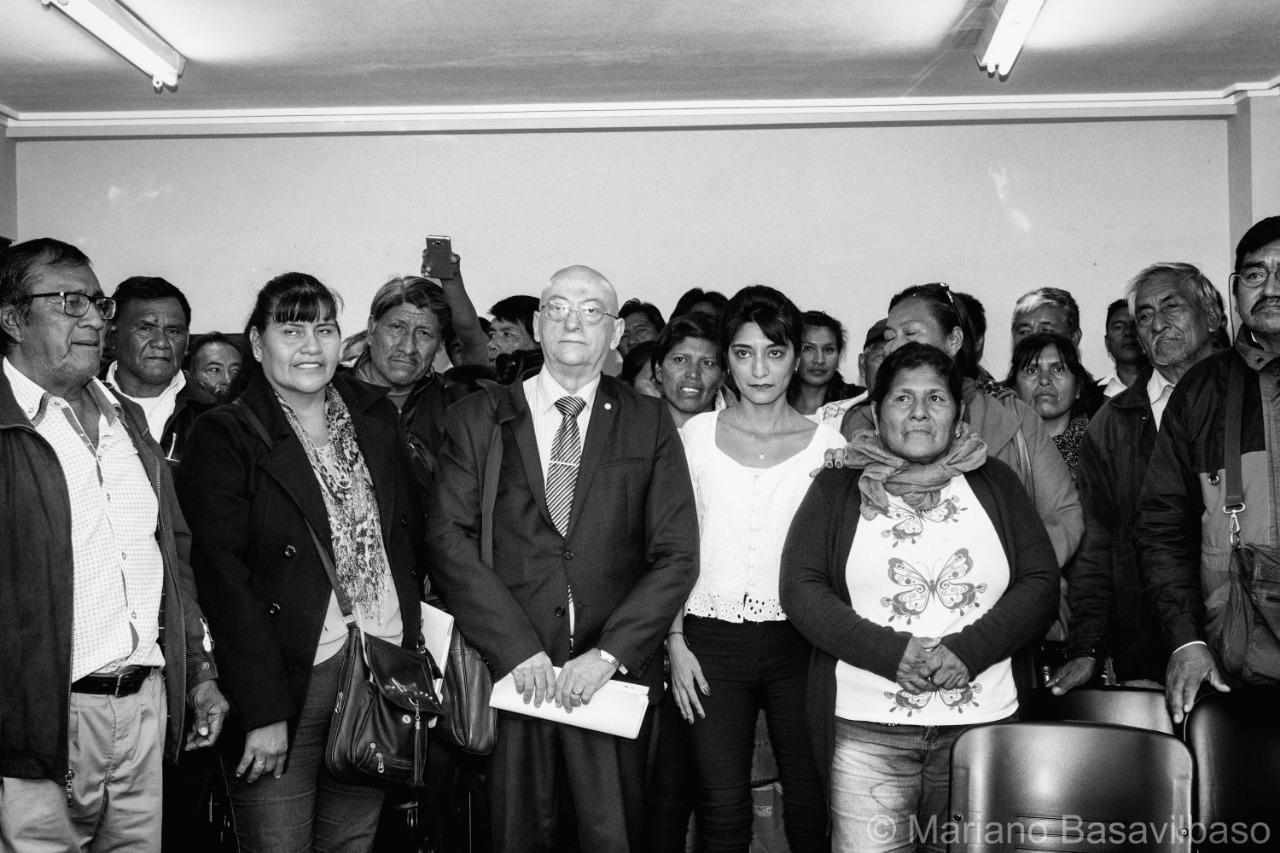
Leaders of the Pilagá Federation at the hearing for closing arguments.

Filed in December 2005 by lawyers Carlos Alberto Díaz and Julio C. García in Formosa Federal Court under Judge Mario Bruno Quinteros, the lawsuit cited the non-applicability of the statute of limitations for crimes against humanity. A forensic team found 27 bodies consistent with the reported events.

=== Testimonies ===
Eight survivors, children at the time, testified in the criminal case: Cristina Duarte (9), Norma Navarrete (15), Ambrocia Rosario González (27), Rogelia Giménez (7), Eduardo Alegría (Ayoche), Martin Pedro (Pilagá Naeron, 13), Ernesto Gómez (Kadeqakien, 14), and Pedro Palavecino (10 or 12). In the civil case, Clara Olmos testified in her native language with an interpreter. Forensic reports and Valeria Mapelman’s Octubre Pilagá were also considered.

The events of La Bomba were largely ignored by official history but preserved in the Pilagá’s collective memory.

— Judgment, folio 19

=== Discovery of mass graves ===
In 2006, investigators found 27 bodies near Las Lomitas.

=== Perpetrators, suspects, and participants ===
The 13th National Gendarmerie Squadron, led by Emilio Fernández Castellanos with José M. Aliaga Pueyrredón as second-in-command, was responsible. A 1991 Gendarmerie publication named four participants: Néstor Leoncio Perloff, Edmundo Zalazar, Francisco Bagardi, and Isabelino Ezcurra.

Leandro Santos Costas, head of the Heavy Machine Gun Section, was charged in 2011 but died before trial. Carlos Smachetti, co-pilot of the Ju-52 T-153, was indicted in 2015 but died in 2017.

=== First-instance ruling ===
In 2019, Formosa Federal Court No. 1 ruled the massacre a crime against humanity, ordering state reparations.

The victims faced a state indifferent to their justice demands, enduring decades of silence and neglect.

— Folio 14

Reparations included:

- Non-monetary:
1. Publish the ruling on the Ministry of Justice and National Institute of Indigenous Affairs websites for three years.
2. Publish in the Official Gazette.
3. Designate October 10 as a commemorative date, coordinated with the Pilagá Federation.
4. Erect a monument at the massacre site.
5. Establish "Reparatory Educational Scholarships for the La Bomba Massacre" (12 university, 30 secondary).
- Monetary:
1. Seventy-two minimum wages annually (approximately $18,750) for ten years to the Pilagá Federation.
2. Six hundred thirty minimum wages annually (approximately $150,000) for ten years for community investments.

The Pilagá Federation appealed, citing insufficient reparations and lack of genocide classification.

=== Second-instance ruling ===
In 2020, the second-instance ruling classified the massacre as a crime against humanity and genocide but upheld the reparations amount, leading to a Supreme Court appeal.

== Literature ==
- Octubre Pilagá: memorias y archivos de la masacre de La Bomba by Valeria Mapelman compiles victim testimonies, historical context, and archival evidence of the massacre and survivor confinement. The book builds on her 2005 documentary research.
- Historia de la crueldad argentina: Julio A. Roca y el genocidio de los pueblos originarios (2010), coordinated by Osvaldo Bayer, analyzes the Napalpí (1924) and La Bomba (1947) massacres.
- Rincón Bomba: lectura de una matanza (2009) by Orlando Van Bredam fictionalizes a soldier’s confession, blending indigenous mysticism with domestic and conspiratorial elements.
- Cicatrices del país by Pedro M. Barrios merges fiction and reality to depict Pilagá suffering and resistance.

== Filmography ==
Octubre pilagá, relatos sobre el silencio (80 min) and La historia en la memoria (18 min), both by Valeria Mapelman (2010), document victim and witness memories. The former won awards at the 2010 Buenos Aires International Festival of Independent Cinema and the Ícaro International Festival in Guatemala.

== See also ==
- Napalpí Massacre
- Conquest of the Desert
- Indigenous peoples in Argentina

== Bibliography ==
- D'Addario, Luciano Martín (2013). "Las políticas estatales hacia los pueblos indígenas y las prácticas de normalización durante el primer peronismo" [State policies toward indigenous peoples and normalization practices during the first Peronism] (PDF). XIV Jornadas Interescuelas/Departamentos de Historia (in Spanish). Mendoza: Departamento de Historia, Facultad de Filosofía y Letras, Universidad Nacional de Cuyo.
- Ilardo, Corina (2015). "Cine e historia: Octubre Pilagá, un documental sobre la masacre de Rincón Bomba" [Cinema and history: Octubre Pilagá, a documentary about the Rincón Bomba massacre]. Toma Uno (in Spanish) (4). Escuela de Ciencias de la Información, Universidad Nacional de Córdoba.
- Kaplan, Marta Sara; Rioboo, Delia Beatriz (2007). "Rincón Bomba: relaciones de poder entre el Estado y el Movimiento Milenarista del Dios Luciano" [Rincón Bomba: power relations between the state and the Millenarian Movement of God Luciano] (PDF). XI Jornadas Interescuelas/Departamentos de Historia (in Spanish). San Miguel de Tucumán: Departamento de Historia, Facultad de Filosofía y Letras, Universidad de Tucumán.
- Mapelman, Valeria (2015). Octubre Pilagá: memorias y archivos de la masacre de La Bomba [October Pilagá: memories and archives of the La Bomba massacre] (in Spanish). Tren en Movimiento.
- Policastro, Carolina; Villordo, Marina (2007). "¿Matanzas o prácticas genocidas? Problematización en torno al accionar represivo del Estado Nacional: Napalpí (1924) y Rincón Bomba (1947)" [Massacres or genocidal practices? Problematization regarding the repressive actions of the National State: Napalpí (1924) and Rincón Bomba (1947)] (PDF). XI Jornadas Interescuelas/Departamentos de Historia (in Spanish). San Miguel de Tucumán: Departamento de Historia, Facultad de Filosofía y Letras, Universidad de Tucumán.
- Trinchero, Héctor Hugo (2009). "Las masacres del olvido. Napalpí y Rincón Bomba en la genealogía del genocidio y el racismo de estado en la Argentina" [The massacres of oblivion: Napalpí and Rincón Bomba in the genealogy of genocide and state racism in Argentina] (PDF). Runa (in Spanish). XXX (1).
- "Fallo inédito para reparar una matanza indígena de 1947 en Formosa. La masacre pilagá fue declarada crimen de lesa humanidad" [Unprecedented ruling to repair a 1947 indigenous massacre in Formosa. The Pilagá massacre was declared a crime against humanity]. Página 12 (in Spanish). July 5, 2019.
- Judgment (2019). "Sentencia en la causa 'Federación de Comunidades Indígenas del Pueblo Pilagá c/ PEN s/ Daños y perjuicios' N° FRE 21000173/2006" [Judgment in the case 'Federation of Indigenous Communities of the Pilagá People v. National Executive Branch for Damages' No. FRE 21000173/2006] (PDF). Juzgado Federal de Resistencia (in Spanish). Archived from the original (PDF) on May 2, 2021.
