= Ramón Lista Department =

Ramón Lista Departamento Ramón Lista
- Department
- Interactive map of Ramón Lista
- Country: Argentina
- Seat: El Chorro

Area
  - Total: 3,800 km^{2} (1,500 sq mi)

Population (2022)
  - Total: 17,729
  - Density: 4.7/km^{2} (12/sq mi)

Ramón Lista is a department of the province of Formosa (Argentina).
