= Misión Tacaaglé =

Coordinates: 24°56′S 58°46′W

- Interactive map of Misión Tacaaglé
- Country: Argentina
- Province: Formosa Province
- Time zone: UTC−3 (ART)

Misión Tacaaglé is a settlement in northern Argentina. It is located in Formosa Province.

== Climate ==
Misión Tacaaglé has a humid subtropical climate (Köppen climate classification: Cfa) that closely borders on a tropical wet and dry climate (Aw). Summers are long, hot and humid while winters are mild and drier.

Climate data for General Villegas (1941–1950)
Month	Jan	Feb	Mar	Apr	May	Jun	Jul	Aug	Sep	Oct	Nov	Dec	Year
Record high °C (°F)	42.8 (109.0)	43.0 (109.4)	40.1 (104.2)	38.5 (101.3)	35.5 (95.9)	34.0 (93.2)	34.5 (94.1)	41.0 (105.8)	41.0 (105.8)	43.3 (109.9)	42.4 (108.3)	44.0 (111.2)	44.0 (111.2)
Mean daily maximum °C (°F)	36.3 (97.3)	35.1 (95.2)	32.6 (90.7)	29.7 (85.5)	26.7 (80.1)	23.9 (75.0)	23.8 (74.8)	27.5 (81.5)	29.2 (84.6)	31.2 (88.2)	33.0 (91.4)	35.6 (96.1)	30.4 (86.7)
Daily mean °C (°F)	28.7 (83.7)	28.1 (82.6)	25.8 (78.4)	23.3 (73.9)	20.8 (69.4)	18.3 (64.9)	17.7 (63.9)	20.5 (68.9)	21.9 (71.4)	24.0 (75.2)	25.8 (78.4)	28.1 (82.6)	23.6 (74.5)
Mean daily minimum °C (°F)	21.2 (70.2)	21.4 (70.5)	19.6 (67.3)	16.8 (62.2)	14.5 (58.1)	12.2 (54.0)	11.5 (52.7)	12.7 (54.9)	14.6 (58.3)	16.9 (62.4)	18.3 (64.9)	20.0 (68.0)	16.6 (61.9)
Record low °C (°F)	11.5 (52.7)	9.0 (48.2)	9.4 (48.9)	2.7 (36.9)	0.5 (32.9)	−4.0 (24.8)	−1.4 (29.5)	−1.5 (29.3)	−1.2 (29.8)	4.0 (39.2)	8.3 (46.9)	9.4 (48.9)	−4.0 (24.8)
Average precipitation mm (inches)	118 (4.6)	116 (4.6)	162 (6.4)	79 (3.1)	74 (2.9)	87 (3.4)	38 (1.5)	19 (0.7)	56 (2.2)	95 (3.7)	144 (5.7)	68 (2.7)	1,056 (41.6)
Source: Sistema de Clasificación Bioclimática Mundial
