= El Chorro, Formosa =

El Chorro
- Village
- Location within Argentina
- Coordinates: 23°13′00″S 62°18′00″W
- Country: Argentina
- Province: Formosa
- Department: Ramón Lista

Population (2010 Census)
  - Total: 1,902
- Time zone: UTC−3 (ART)
- CPA Base: P 3636
- Climate: Dfc

El Chorro, previously known as General Mosconi until 1 January 2016, is a village and the capital of the Ramón Lista Department of Formosa Province, Argentina. It connects with the RP 39 to the Paraje Bolsa de Palomo.
