= Formosa Province =

Province of Argentina

Coordinates: 26°11′00″S 58°10′30″W

Formosa
- Province
- Province of Formosa; Provincia de Formosa (Spanish)
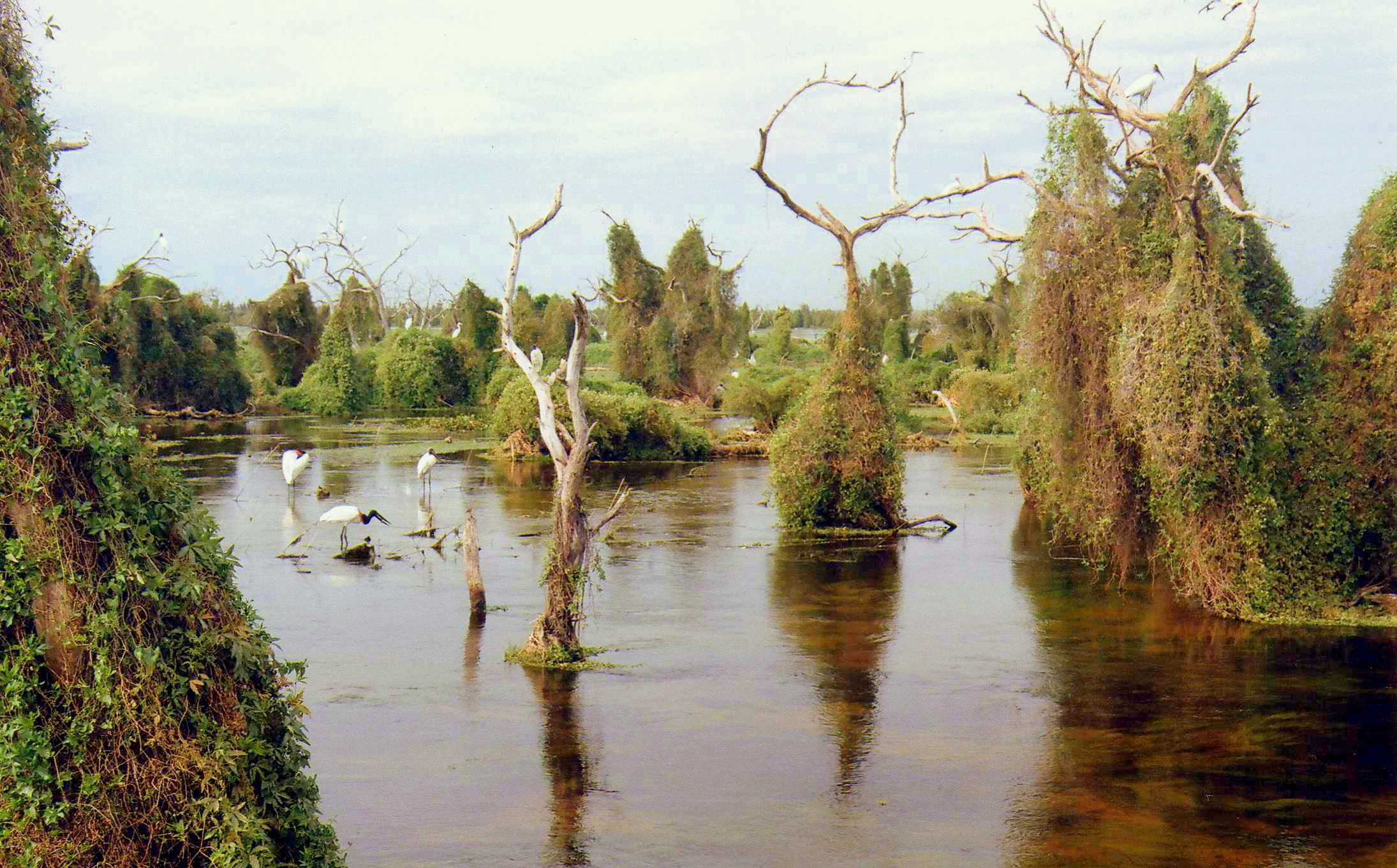
- The Bañado La Estrella

- Flag Coat of arms
- Anthem: Anthem of Formosa Province
- Country: Argentina
- Capital: Formosa

Government
  - Governor: Gildo Insfrán (PJ)
  - Vice Governor: Eber Solís (PJ)
  - Legislature: 30
  - National Deputies: 5
  - National Senators: María Teresa González (FDT); José Mayans (FDT); Francisco Paoltroni (LLA)

Area
  - Total: 72,066 km^{2} (27,825 sq mi)

Population (2022 census)
  - Total: 606,941
  - Rank: 17th
  - Density: 8.4220/km^{2} (21.813/sq mi)
- Demonym: Formoseño

GDP
  - Total: US$ 5.7 billion
  - Per capita: US$ 9,300
- Time zone: UTC−3 (ART)
- ISO 3166 code: AR-P
- HDI (2021): 0.822 very high (23rd)
- Website: formosa.gob.ar

Formosa Province (Spanish pronunciation: [foɾˈmosa]) is a province in northeastern Argentina, part of the Gran Chaco Region. Formosa's northeast end touches Asunción, Paraguay, and the province borders the provinces of Chaco and Salta to its south and west, respectively. The capital is Formosa.

== Source of the provincial name ==
The name of the city (and the province) comes from the archaic Spanish word fermosa (currently hermosa) meaning "beautiful". The name Vuelta Fermosa or Vuelta la Formosa was used by Spanish sailors in the 16th century to describe the area where the Paraguay River makes a turn, right in front of the actual city. These sailors were searching for the legendary Sierra del Plata.

== History ==
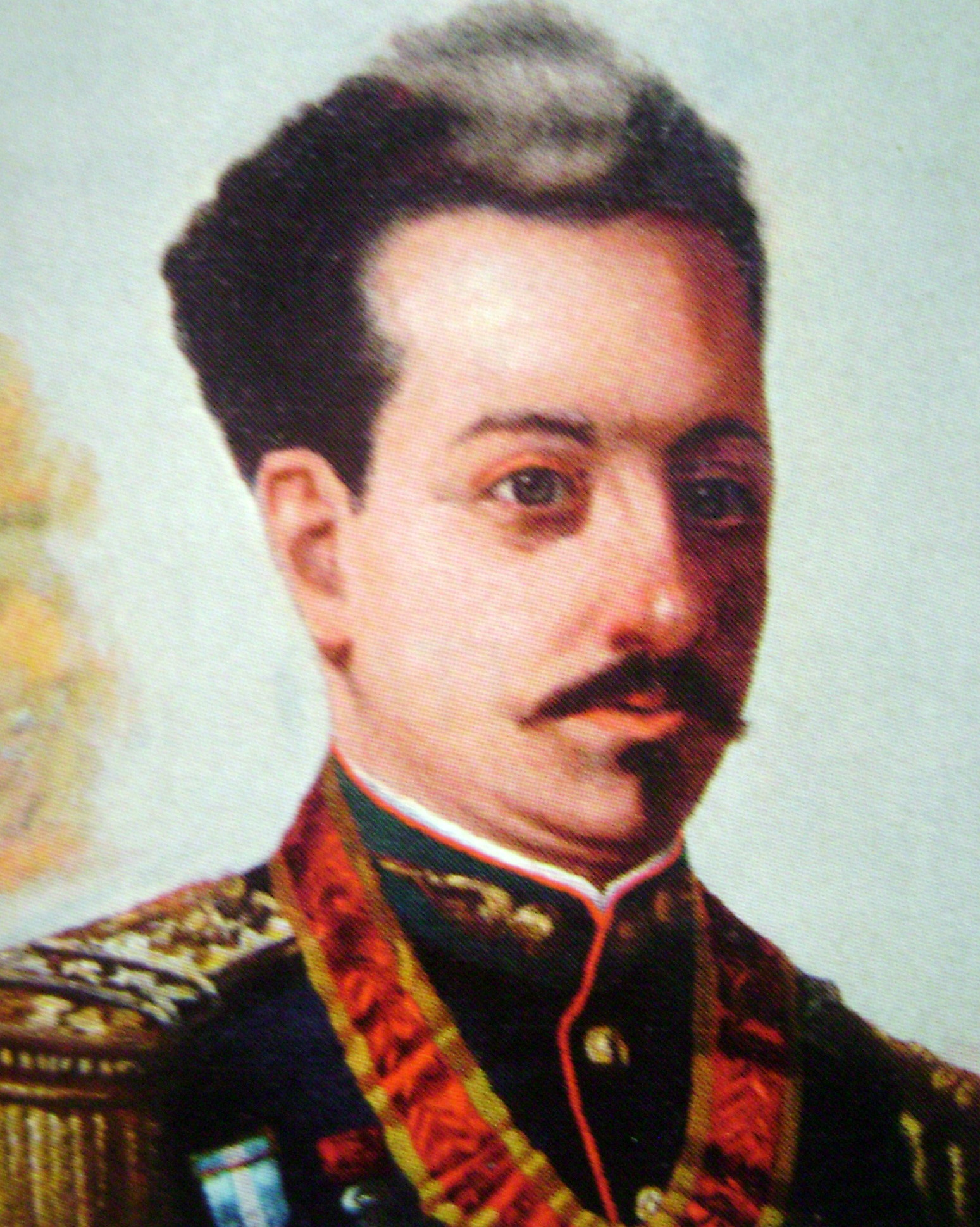
Commander Luis Jorge Fontana, founder of the city of Formosa and the territory's foremost early promoter.

Native inhabitants of these lands include the Pilagás, Wichis and Tobas, whose languages are still spoken in the province.

Sebastian Cabot and Diego García de Moguer first explored the area at the beginning of the 16th century trying to find a route from Viceroyalty of Peru to Asunción. Because the Pilcomayo and Bermejo Rivers are so shallow, the attempts to set a route towards Asunción was abandoned.

The area's first European settlement, Concepción del Bermejo, was established in 1585. Following the establishment of Argentine and Paraguayan independence in the 1810s, the area fell under dispute between the two nations, a matter not settled until after the War of the Triple Alliance (1865–70). Commander Luis Jorge Fontana founded the settlement of Formosa in 1879, bringing the remote area into national attention and helping to secure a territorial status in 1884.

Formosa had less than 20,000 inhabitants in 1914; but in 1955, when it acquired the status of Province by decree of President Juan Perón, it had already more than 150,000. Following the Rincón Bomba massacre by the Argentinean Gendarmerie of nomadic Amerindians in 1947, President Perón initiated a program of land reform in the province; the program, by the time of his 1955 overthrow, had issued only around 4,000 land grants, however. Continuing to grow slowly, though relatively steadily, the Formosa campus of the National University of the Northeast was established as the National University of Formosa in 1988.

== Geography ==
Located within the geographic coordinates 26° 22°30' south, and 57°30' 62°25' west, the plains run between the Bermejo and Pilcomayo Rivers with a slight inclination towards the southeast. Due to this flatness, riverbeds are not stable, and small lagoons that are slowly reabsorbed arise.

=== Climate ===
Köppen climate map of Formosa, Argentina

The average annual temperature is 21 °C; during summer it can rise to 45 °C.

The tropical weather is characterized with uniform annual rains in the east (1000 mm annual), while in the rest of the country winter is a drier season (80 mm). The humidity variation results in the jungle vegetation on one side, and the Chaqueño forest in the other. The limit with the Salta Province is known as the Impenetrable ("Impenetrable").

Formosa's protected areas are the Río Pilcomayo National Park and the Formosa National Reserve.

== Demographics ==
Formosa population pyramid (2022)

According to the 2022 Argentine national census, the Province of Formosa has 606,941 inhabitants.

== Economy ==
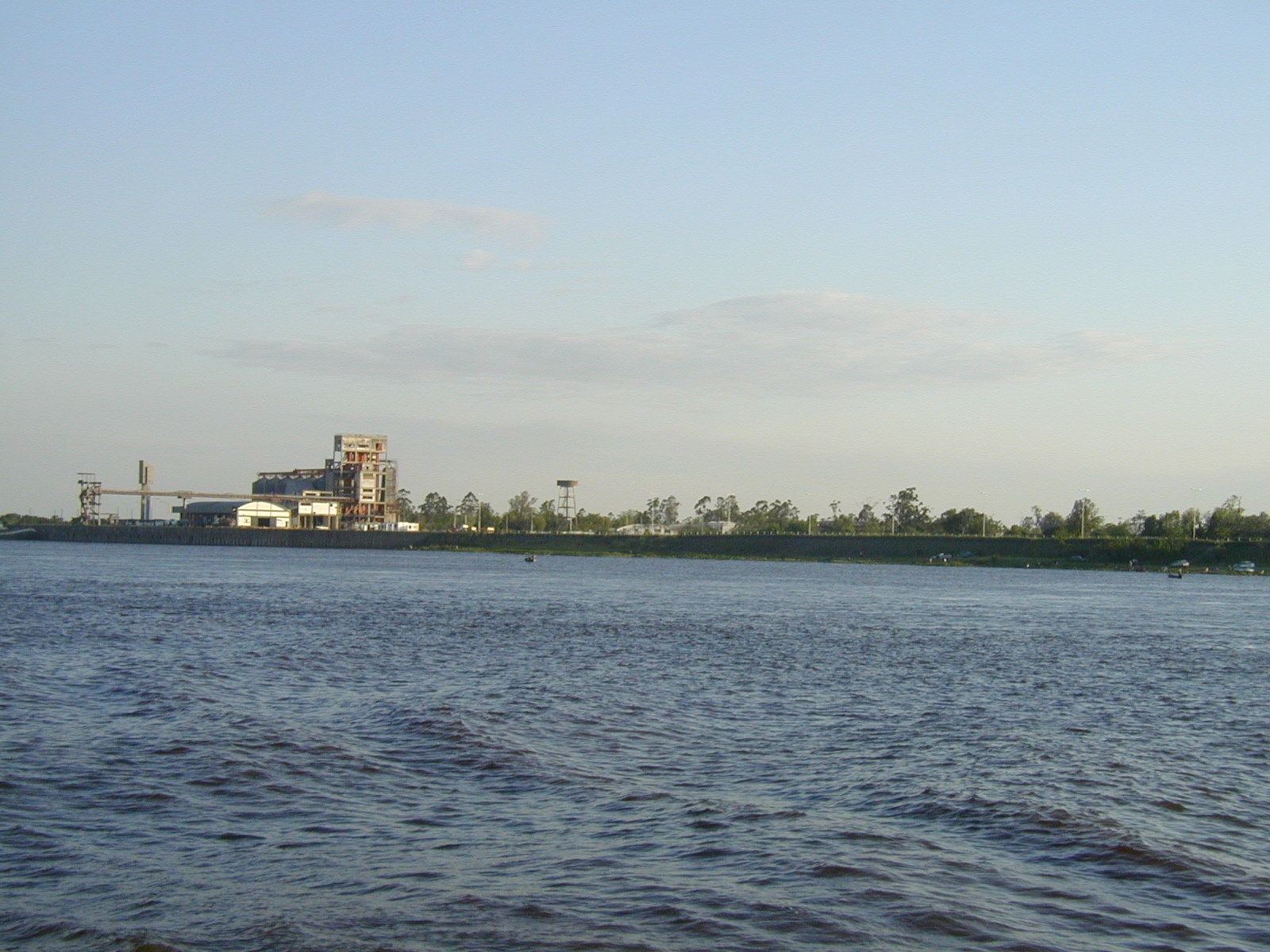
The Port of Formosa along the Paraguay River

Remote and saddled by its inhospitable geography and climate, Formosa's economy has long been one of Argentina's poorest. Its economy in 2006 was estimated at US$2.082 billion, or, US$4,278 per capita. Its economy is the third-smallest and second-least developed in Argentina, yet it has shared in Argentina's recovery since 2002 very well.

Poorly industrialized, Formosa's economy is based on cattle and agricultural activities like cotton and fruit cultivation, these being mostly centered in the Patino, Pilagás and Pilcomayo departments.

Cattle in Formosa exceed 1.5 million head and ranching has long been the agricultural mainstay of the province. Like elsewhere in Argentina, agriculture has long since been overtaken by other activities and amounts to about 10% of Formosa's output (somewhat more than average).

Cotton cultivation passed from over 100,000 tons at the end of the 1970s to 10,000 at the end of the 1990s because of the drop of the international price, and the fixed exchange rate. After the 2001 crisis, production slightly revived to 50,000 tons a year in 2004. More than 70% of the area sown with cotton belongs to small family-run farms of less than 10 hectares.

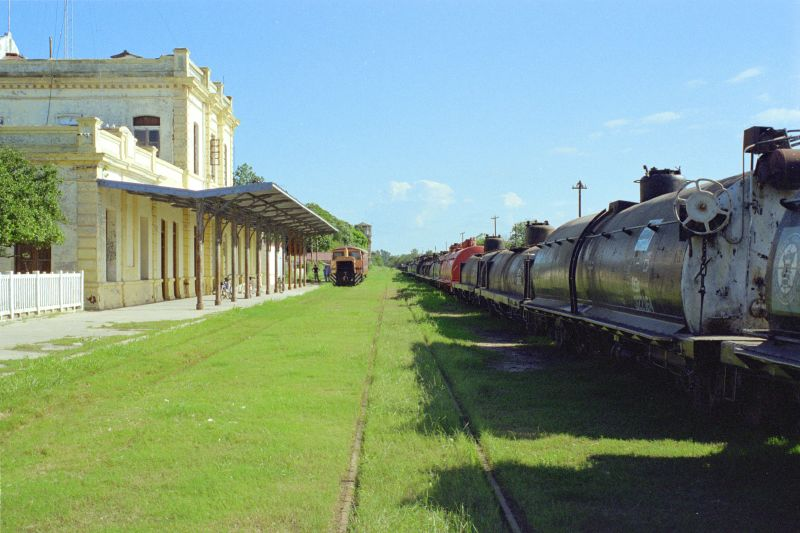
Freight rail station in the city of Formosa

Cotton represents half of the agricultural wealth of the province followed by soybean (25,000 tons a year) and maize (55,000 tons), who have experienced a less dramatic invigoration after the 2001 crisis.

Bananas, grown mainly for domestic consumption, amount to a steady annual average crop of 70,000 tons. Citrus and juice production for exportation, specially grapefruit, is growing rapidly, with 1,200 planted hectares and an annual production of around 15,000 tons.

Others; honey (273 tons) and derivatives, timber-wood (140,000 tons) and textile industry (cotton, leather).

Tourist infrastructure is barely developed. Sites of interest include the city of Formosa, the Río Pilcomayo National Park, Bañado La Estrella, Laguna Yema, Herradura town, and Misión Laishí.

== Government ==
The provincial government is divided into the usual three branches: the executive, headed by a popularly elected governor, who appoint the cabinet; the legislative; and the judiciary, headed by the Supreme Court.

The Constitution of Formosa Province forms the formal law of the province.

In Argentina, the most important law enforcement organization is the Argentine Federal Police but the additional work is carried out by the Formosa Provincial Police.

== Political divisions ==
The province is divided into nine departments:

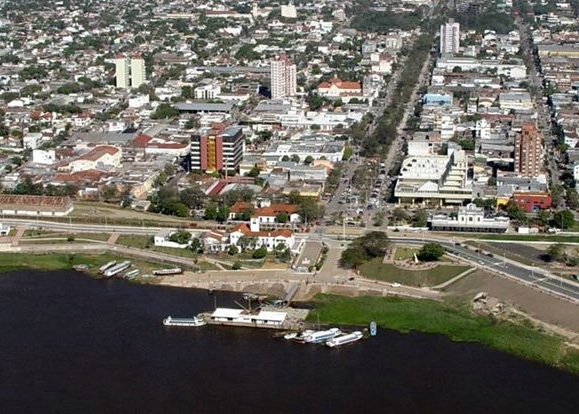
City of Formosa

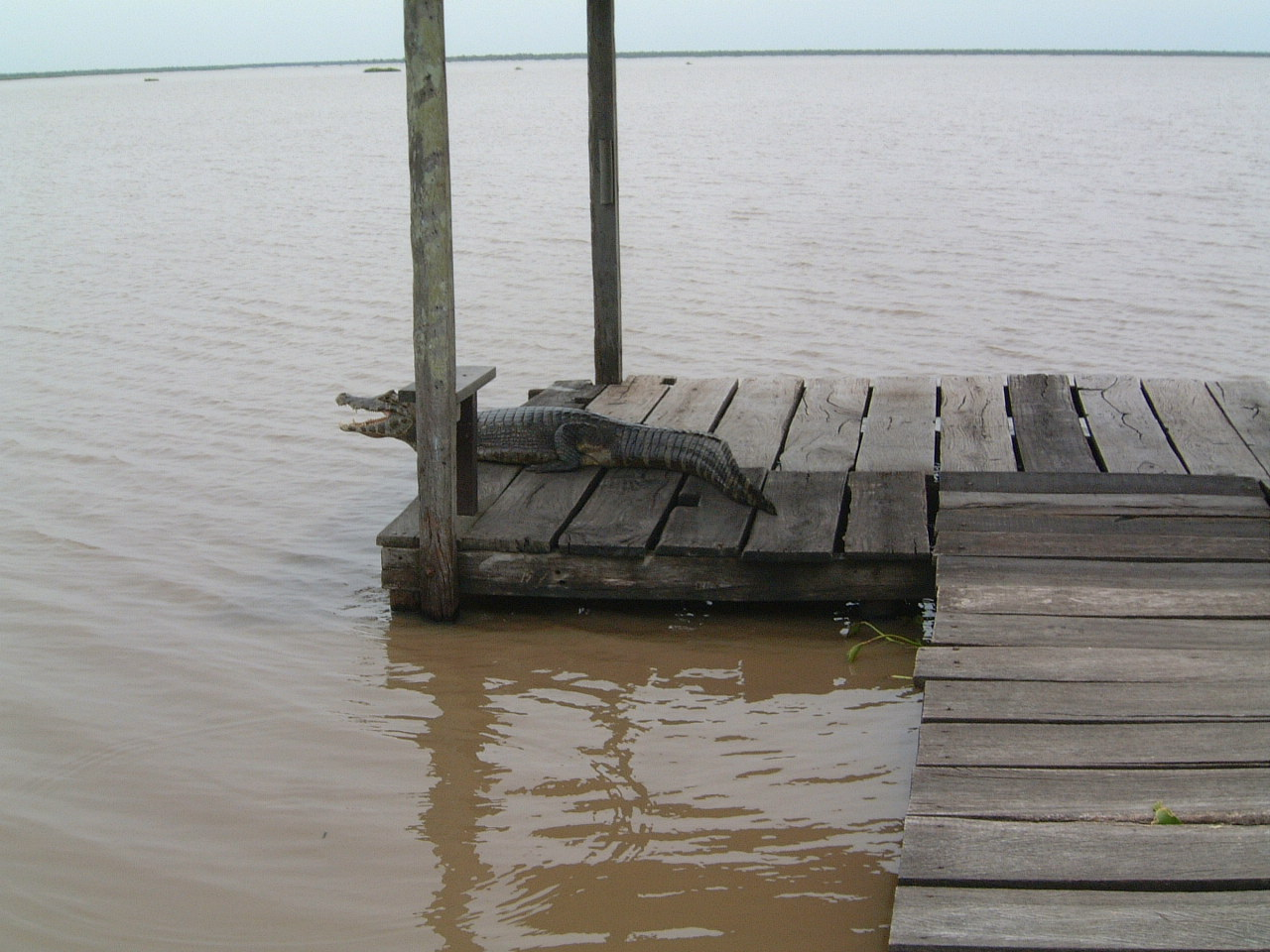
Yacaré alligator on the Pilcomayo River

Department	Principal city	Population (2022)	Other Municipalities
Bermejo	Laguna Yema	16,576	Los Chiriguanos, Pozo de Maza, Pozo del Mortero
Formosa	Formosa	276,309	Colonia Pastoril, Gran Guardia, San Hilario, Mariano Boedo, Mojón de Fierro, Villa del Carmen, Villa Trinidad
Laishí	San Francisco de Laishi	19,228	Banco Payaguá, General Lucio V. Mansilla, Herradura, Tatané, Villa Escolar
Matacos	Ingeniero Juárez	17,551	
Patiño	Comandante Fontana	77,974	Bartolomé de las Casas, Colonia Sarmiento, El Recreo, Estanislao del Campo, Fortín Leyes, Fortín Lugones, General Manuel Belgrano, Ibarreta, Juan G. Bazán, Las Lomitas, Posta Cambio Zalazar, Pozo del Tigre, San Martín, Subteniente Perín, Villa General Güemes
Pilagás	El Espinillo	20,783	Buena Vista, Misión Tacaaglé, Portón Negro, Tres Lagunas
Pilcomayo	Clorinda	98,490	Laguna Blanca, Laguna Naick Neck, Palma Sola, Puerto Pilcomayo, Riacho He-Hé, Riacho Negro, Siete Palmas
Pirané	Pirané	70,300	El Colorado, Mayor Vicente Villafañe, Palo Santo, Villa Dos Trece
Ramón Lista	General Mosconi	17,495	El Potrillo

== Villages ==
- Herradura, settlement
- Villa General Güemes, settlement

== State anthem ==
Formosa has its own anthem, called "Himno Marcha Formosa". On April 8, 1955, the Anthem "Marcha Formosa" was sung for the first time, in 1964 the definitive arrangement of it was made and it became official as a song. By decree No. 1471 of July 21, 1988, compulsory education was established in primary, secondary and tertiary establishments and its intonation in public events.

== See also ==
- Provinces of Argentina
- Río Pilcomayo National Park
