= Patricia Ocampo =

Argentine activist (born 1979)

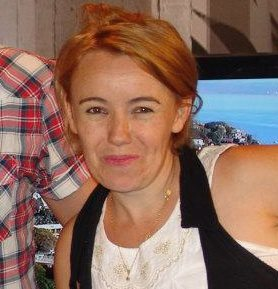
- Born: December 26, 1979 (age 46); Oberá, Misiones Province
- Organization: Un sueño para Misiones
- Movement: Peace movement
- Parent(s): Juan Mauricio Ocampo; Zusana Da Cruz

Patricia Ocampo (born 1979) is an Argentine activist involved in community development and creation of libraries in Misiones Province. By 2014, she had worked with community organizers and celebrities to found 20 libraries. The organization she co-founded provides basic assistance to those in poverty and with disabilities and attempts to empower people through education and access to books and libraries. She is also involved in trying to stop child labor in Argentina, specifically in the yerba mate regions.

== Biography ==
Patricia Liliana Ocampo was born 26 December 1979 in Oberá, Misiones Province, Argentina. She grew up in a family that could not afford books and she realized when she was in school the power books have to expand ideas.

She serves as the regional head of the Federal Authority for Audiovisual Communication Services (AFSCA), Argentina's broadcast media regulator.

In 2011, she helped found the movement "Un sueño para Misiones" (A dream for Misiones Province), an organization that attempts to bridge the gap between government services and citizens needs. Primarily known for building libraries the group addresses a wide range of issues in Misiones Province, from illiteracy to providing clothing and basic needs for citizens living in poverty, to creation of community gardens to assistance to those with disability, to addressing child labor. Ocampo has been successful in building support for expanding and creating new libraries by both community involvement and asking celebrities and writers to donate books or help raise funds. In 2014, the 20th library was built.

=== Libraries ===
In 2010, Patricia Ocampo, Jorge Kordi and Daniela Paola Friedl began a project to build libraries throughout the Misiones Province. The goal was to build ten libraries the first year in villages with populations between 2500 and 5000 people, seeding each library with 1,000 initial books. The first library they completed was in the village of San Martín in the former home of Eino Parkkulainen, who created the Finnish-Spanish dictionary. The second library was founded in Puerto Leoni. Libraries three, in the barrio 180 Viviendas de Oberá; four, in Guaraní; and five, in Colonia Victoria were all founded by the organization's first anniversary. The sixth library opened by the group was in Loreto and the seventh was in Panambí. The eighth library was built in the village of Colonia Delicia and named after Guido Falaschi, whose racing circuit has supported Un sueño para Misiones. The 9th library opened in Wanda and the 10th library opened in Caraguatay in November, 2012.

The 11th library was built in Puerto Libertad, the 12th in Santo Pipó, and in March 2013 the 13th library was opened by the group in El Alcázar. The 14th library was built in Paraje Parejha, the 15th in Puerto Iguazú, and the 16th library was founded in El Saltito. The 17th library was built in Tobuna, and the 18th library was established in San Pedro de Jujuy. The 20th library opened in 2014 in the barrio Sarmiento of the town of Eldorado.

=== Child labor ===
She has met with the National Commission for the Eradication of Child Labour (CONAETI) to discuss working conditions of child laborers. On 4 April 2014, a draft resolution was adopted by the Argentine Chamber of Deputies acknowledging Ocampo's work in the Misiones province since 2010 and declaring their intent to eradicate exploitation of child laborers in the Yerba Mate industry. In October, 2014, Ocampo attended a public audience with Pope Francis in the Vatican City to discuss child labor. In March, 2015, she took the campaign against child labor to the legislature hoping to gain support for a national bill banning the practice in Argentina.
