= Cainguás Department =

Cainguás Departamento Cainguás
- Department
- Interactive map of Cainguás
- Country: Argentina
- Seat: Campo Grande

Area
  - Total: 1,608 km^{2} (621 sq mi)

Population (2022)
  - Total: 59,953
  - Density: 37.28/km^{2} (96.57/sq mi)

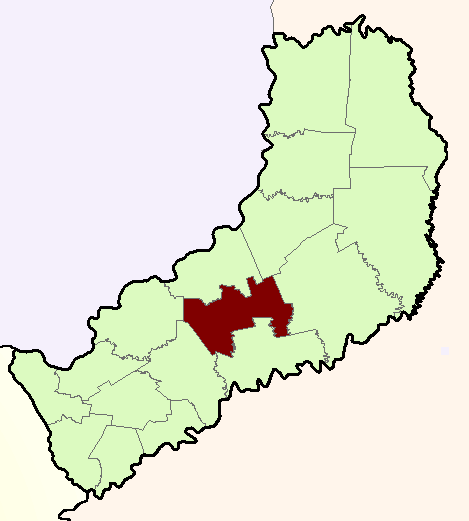
Cainguás Department, Misiones

Cainguás is one of the 17 departments into which the province of Misiones, Argentina, is divided. It is located in the center of the province. Its head is the locality of Campo Grande.

== Geography ==
The department has an area of 1,549 km², equivalent to 5.24% of the total province. It borders the departments of Libertador General San Martín, Montecarlo, Guaraní, Oberá, Veinticinco de Mayo, and San Ignacio.

== Population ==
According to the 2022 Census, there were 59,953 inhabitants living in the department. This number made it the 7th most populated department in the province.
