= Nueve de Julio, Misiones =

9 de Julio (Misiones)
- Municipality and village

- Location within Misiones Province Location within Argentina
- Country: Argentina
- Province: Misiones Misiones Province
- Department: Eldorado
- Established: January 11, 1957

Government
  - Intendant: Rubén Kobler

Population (2001 INDEC)
  - Total: 410
  - Density: 75/sq mi (29/km^{2})
- Time zone: UTC−3 (ART)
- Postcode: N3380
- Area code: 03751

9 de Julio (Misiones) is a village and municipality in Misiones Province in north-eastern Argentina. The municipality is located in the department of Eldorado, bordered by the municipalities of Eldorado, Santiago de Liniers and Colonia Victoria in the same department, and the municipality of Puerto Piray in the Montecarlo department.

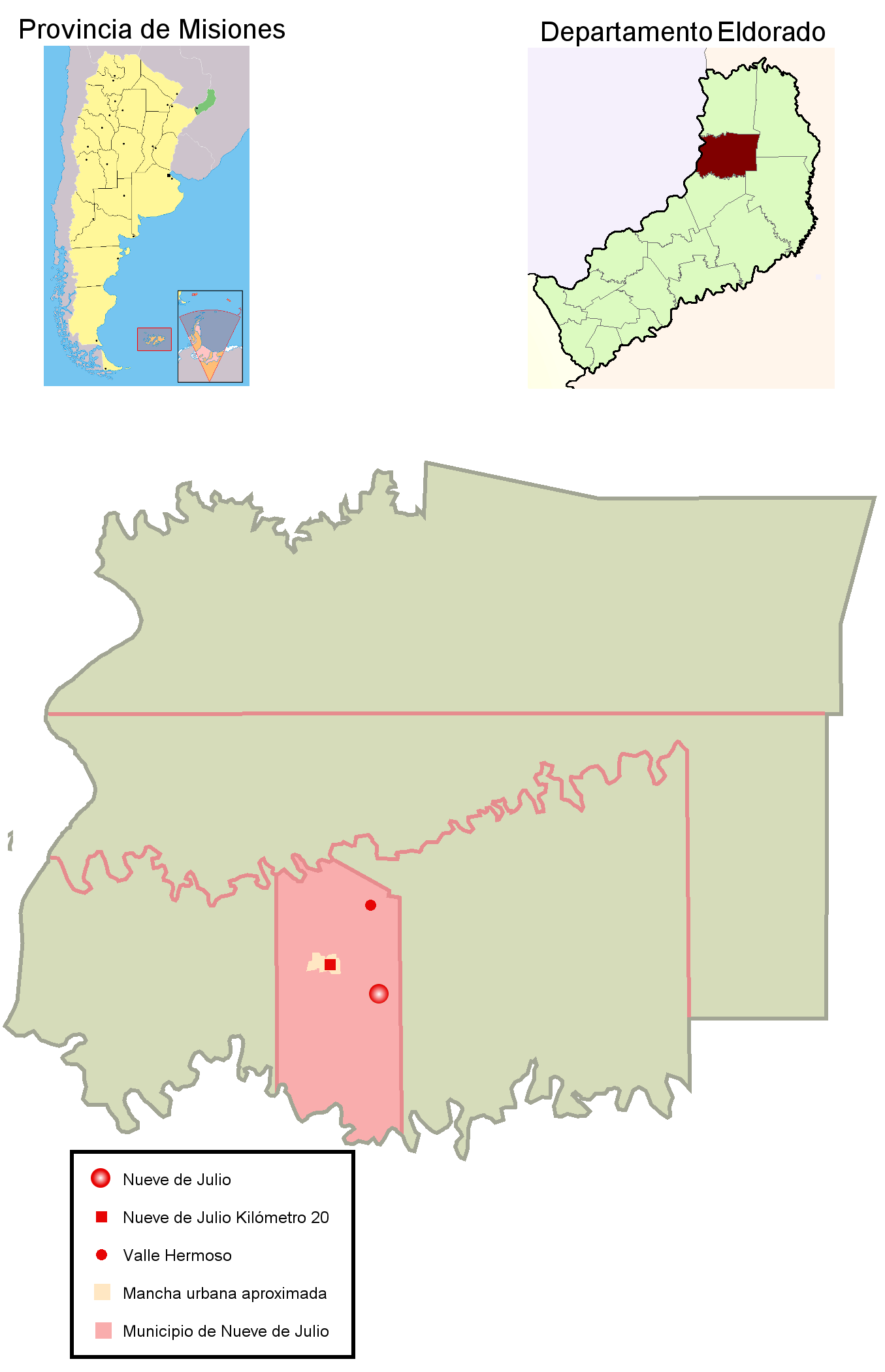
Area of the municipality of Nueve de Julio in the Eldorado department; the minor points represent the towns of Nueve de Julio Kilometre 20 (and its urban area) and Valle Hermoso.

== Location ==
The town of Nueve de Julio is on a path that begins and ends on Provincial Route 17. This path connects it to the west with Eldorado and to the east with Santiago de Liniers and ends in the only dry crossing between Brazil and Argentina (Bernardo de Irigoyen). Access to the village (asphalt) is on the section linking this road with kilometer 20 of the forementioned route (also paved). While the municipal headquarters is located beyond the town of Nueve de Julio, it formed a parallel agglomerate at the intersection of the access road and Provincial Route 19 that has taken away some of the importance of the original nucleus. This nucleus is known as Nueve de Julio Kilometer 20.

== Population ==
Nueve de Julio had 410 inhabitants (INDEC, 2001), marking a 10% decrease compared to the 457 inhabitants (INDEC, 1991) of the previous census. This decrease however contrasts against the growth of almost 70% for Kilometer 20, at 1,224 inhabitants (INDEC, 2001), three times the population of the original nucleus.

== Economy ==
The municipality supports its growth primarily in the forestry industry, and most of the sawmills in the agglomerate were strategically built, and have international connectivity, on Route 19. Another town in the municipality is Valle Hermoso located about 2 miles north of Route 19.
