= Campo Grande, Misiones =

Campo Grande (Misiones)
- Municipality and village
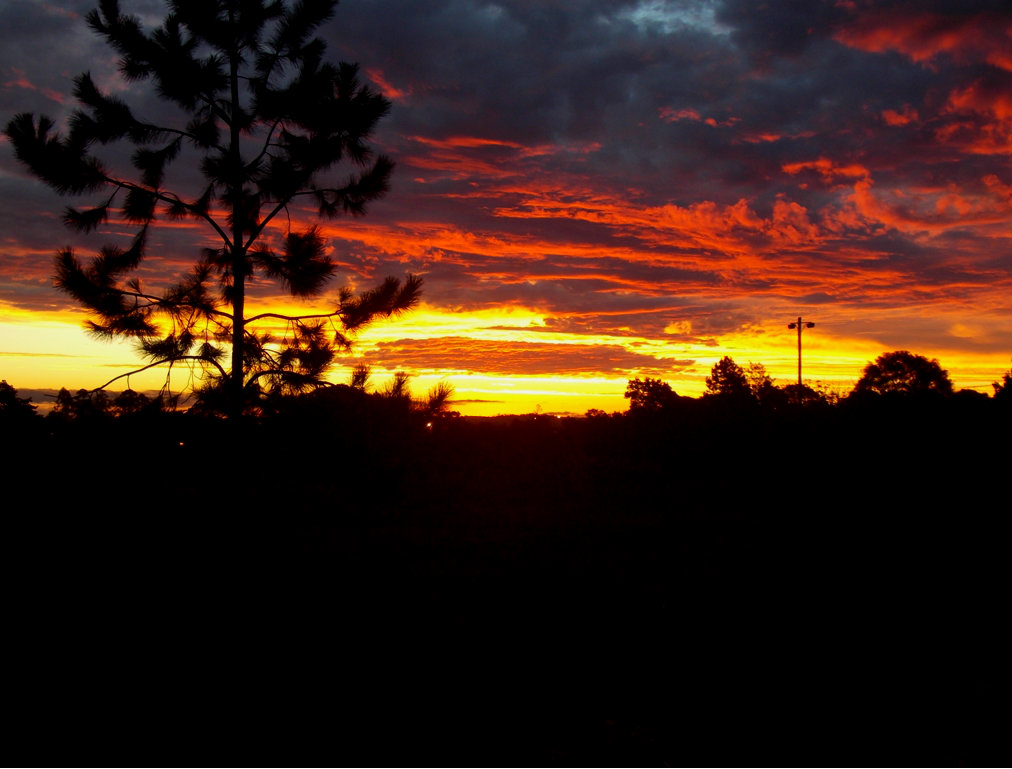

- Location within Misiones Province Location within Argentina
- Country: Argentina
- Province: Misiones Province

Government
  - Intendant: Martin Maximiliano De Oliveira
- Time zone: UTC−3 (ART)

Campo Grande (Misiones) is an Argentine locality in the province of Misiones, the head of the Cainguás department. It borders the municipality of Aristóbulo del Valle, of the same department, and the municipalities of Ruiz de Montoya in the Libertador General San Martín department, Jardín América in the San Ignacio department, Campo Viera and Campo Ramón in the Oberá department, and those of 25 de Mayo and Alba Posse in the 25 de Mayo department.

In the municipality of Campo Grande, there is also the urban nucleus of Primero de Mayo, and another important place is Kilometer 17.

Due to the significant celebrations held on Teacher's Day, Campo Grande is known as the Provincial Capital of the Teacher.

== Population ==
It had 5,293 inhabitants (Indec, 2001), which represents an increase of 34.9% compared to the 3,923 inhabitants (Indec, 1991) of the previous census.

== Etymology ==
Campo Grande was named because it was a field, which was unusual in a closed tropical forest area like the center of Misiones before it was colonized. It is said that this field was created by the Jesuits. In the area, there are many different medicinal herbs and flowers, many of which are not native to that place.

== History ==
In the year 1927, the first settler family arrived. Until that moment, no settlers inhabited this place. In its vicinity, some Brazilian fugitives who lived from hunting and fishing and a Guarani tribe sporadically inhabited.

The first settler was Carlos Albano Bellot, also known as "Don Carlos, the French." He arrived in 1926 and settled in what would later be called "Paraje el Tigre" of Campo Grande, and in 1927, he brought his family.

There were no roads. Carlos, who at that time lived in Brazil, came to Oberá in 1926 looking for a place to settle with his family. A "picada" (trail) went up to Campo Viera, which trucks could traverse. Then, an old logging road continued to the center of the province, which the jungle had already covered because nobody had used that "picada" for a long time. Carlos decided to explore that area, ventured into it, opened a path, and came out into a large field, what would later be called "Campo Grande."

Carlos, whose purpose was to find suitable land for planting yerba mate, found land suitable for it near that field. There, he cleared the land. He planted corn, sweet potatoes, pumpkins, etc., and then went to fetch his family, who were living in Brazil at that time.

The Bellot family cleared a path in the jungle from Campo Viera to Campo Grande to transport their belongings. They had to widen the path in parts, create roads, work on descents, and build temporary bridges.

The Bellot family had to go to Villa Svea, Oberá, to do the shopping since the nearest store was there.

Carlos spread the word that he had found good public lands to plant yerba mate, and that is how in 1928, the second settler family arrived to settle in the area, the family of Don David Vichy, and with him, his foreman, Mr. Feliciano Montenegro. At the same time, the Michelón family arrived. In 1929, the Sartori family, Guillermo, and Pedro, came to the Campo Grande area.

Approximately around 1929 or 1930, the police settled in an abandoned shack. The shack was next to a spring, on the edge of the Jesuit field, where years later an airfield would be built.

Then, a Paraguayan gentleman came and built a shack in front of the police station. When the gendarmerie settled next to the police station, this gentleman sold it to Don Vázques.

The "picada" became "Route 14" around 1930. At that time, the road went through what is now the area of "La Novena," Campo Grande.

Don Michelón planted yerba mate for a man from Rosario named Gamberini. Over time, Mr. Gamberini also came to settle in the area. Mr. Gamberini was the grandfather of the man known as "Pucho" Lanciani.

Don Carlos el Francés and his family planted around 400 hectares of yerba mate. Later, he donated part of his land for the construction of School Number 209, the Church, and the Cemetery of Paraje el Tigre, and helped to process the installation of the first Civil Registry of Campo Grande.
