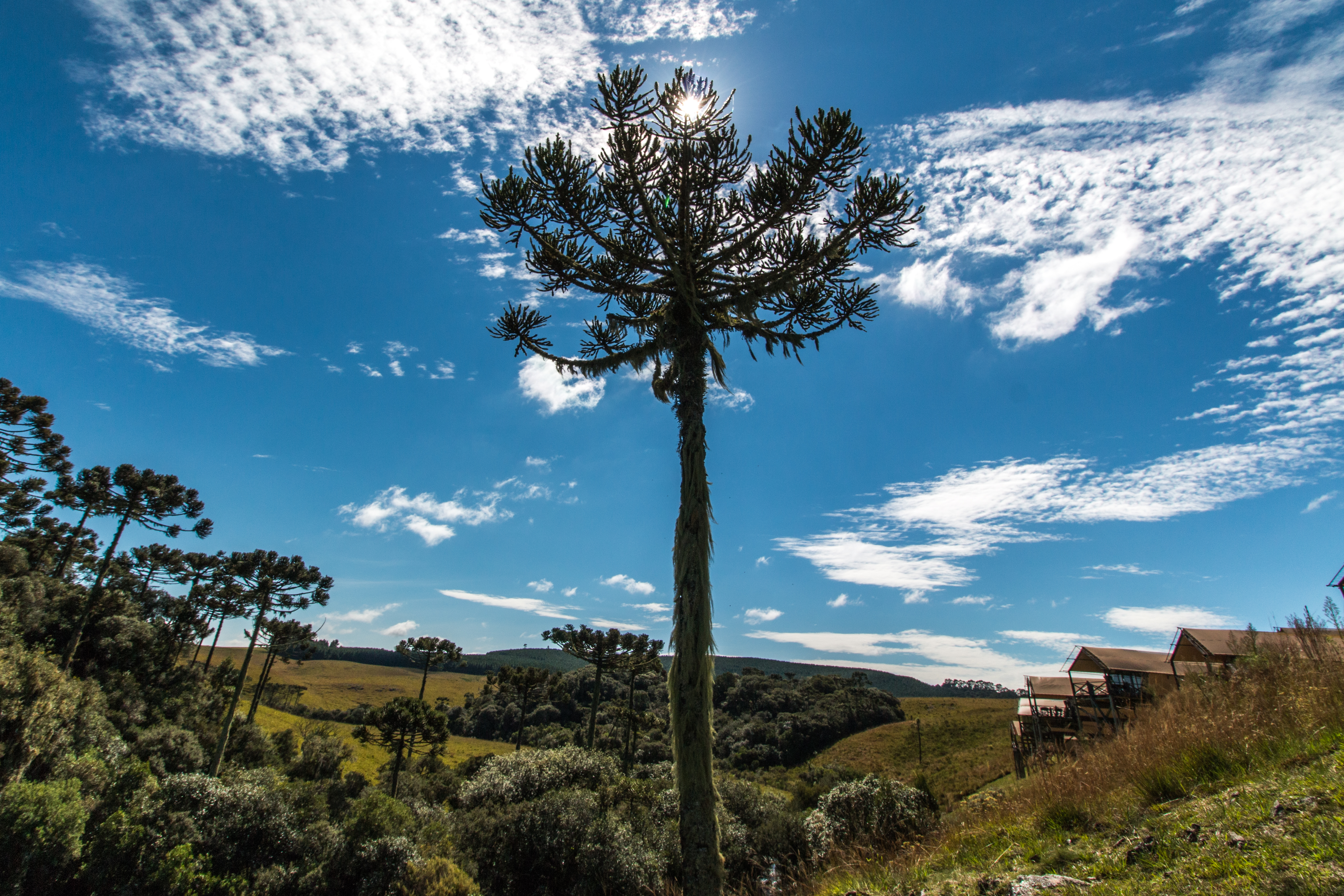
- Adult tree in Aparados da Serra National Park, Brazil

Conservation status
- Critically Endangered (IUCN 3.1)

Scientific classification
- Kingdom: Plantae
- Clade: Tracheophytes
- Clade: Gymnosperms
- Division: Pinophyta
- Class: Pinopsida
- Order: Araucariales
- Family: Araucariaceae
- Genus: Araucaria
- Section: A. sect. Araucaria
- Species: A. angustifolia

Binomial name
- Araucaria angustifolia (Bertol.) Kuntze

Synonyms
- List: Araucaria angustifolia var. alba Reitz; Araucaria angustifolia var. caiova Reitz; Araucaria angustifolia var. caiuva Mattos; Araucaria angustifolia f. catharinensis Mattos; Araucaria angustifolia var. dependens Mattos; Araucaria angustifolia var. indehiscens Mattos; Araucaria angustifolia var. monoica Reitz; Araucaria angustifolia var. nigra Reitz; Araucaria angustifolia var. sancti-josephi Reitz; Araucaria angustifolia var. semialba Reitz; Araucaria angustifolia var. stricta Reitz; Araucaria angustifolia var. vinacea Mattos; Araucaria brasiliana A.Rich.; Araucaria brasiliana var. gracilis Carrière; Araucaria brasiliana var. ridolfiana (Pi.Savi) Gordon; Araucaria brasiliana var. saviana (Parl.) Parl.; Araucaria brasiliensis Loudon (Spelling variant); Araucaria brasiliensis A. Rich.; Araucaria brasiliensis var. saviana (Parl.) Parl.; Araucaria dioica (Vell.) Stellfeld; Araucaria elegans Carrière; Araucaria ridolfiana Pi.Savi; Araucaria saviana Parl.; Columbea angustifolia Bertol. (basionym); Columbea brasiliana (A.Rich.) Carrière; Columbea brasiliana var. elegans Carrière; Columbea brasiliana var. ridolfiana (Pi.Savi) Carrière; Columbea brasiliensis var. ridolfina (Pi. Savi) Carrière; Pinus dioica Vell.

= Araucaria angustifolia =

Species of plant

Araucaria angustifolia, the Paraná pine, Brazilian pine or candelabra tree, is a critically endangered species of conifer in the family Araucariaceae. Although the common names in various languages refer to the species as a pine, it does not belong in the genus Pinus.

== Description ==
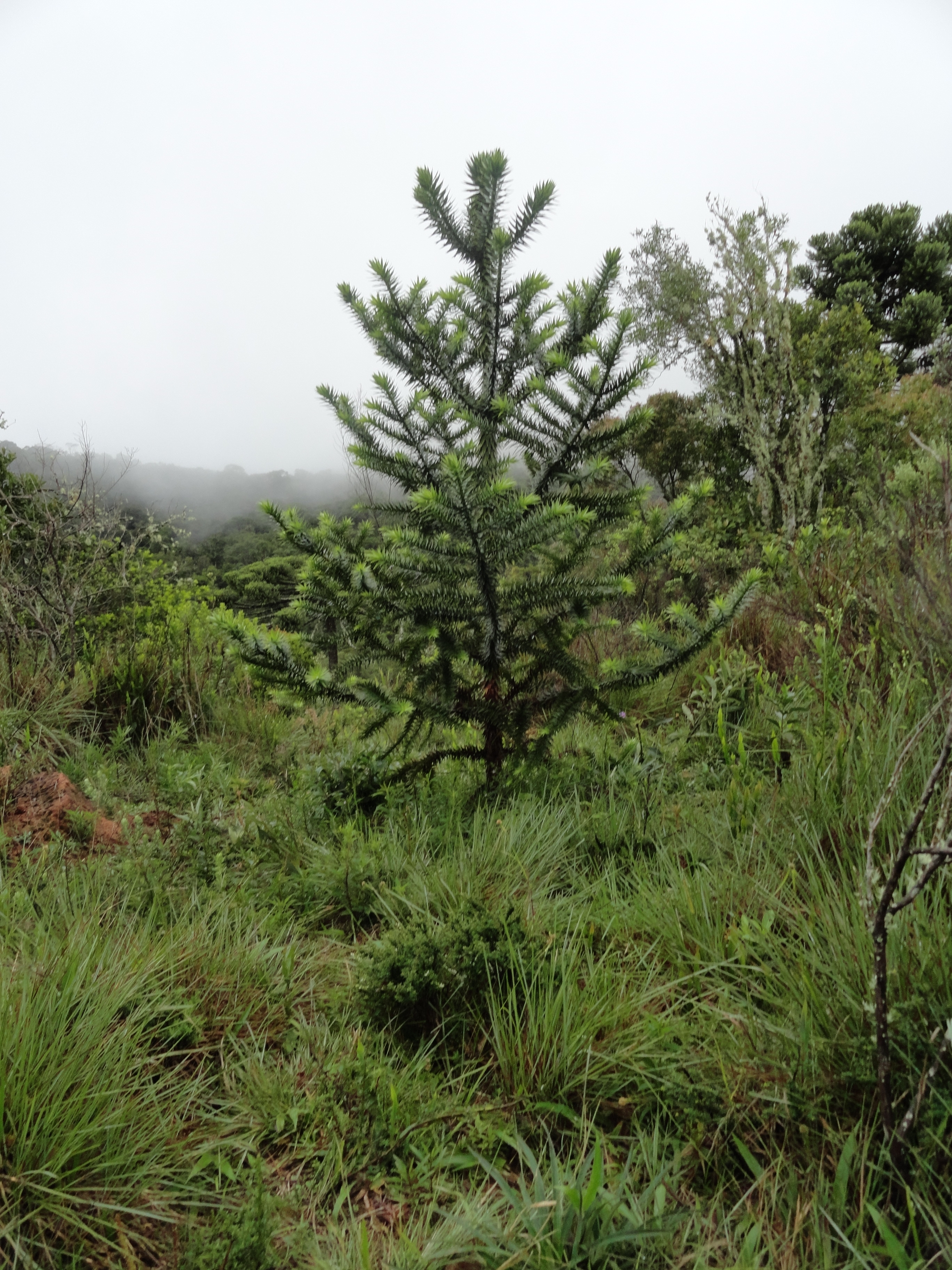
A very young A. angustifolia

It is an evergreen tree usually growing to 40 m (130 ft) tall and 1 m (3.3 ft) diameter at breast height. The tree is fast growing; as much as 16 m (52 ft) in 14 years in a plantation at Puerto Piray, Misiones Province, Argentina. The leaves are thick, tough and scale like, triangular, 3–6 cm (1.2–2.4 in) long, 5–10 mm (0.2–0.4 in) broad at the base, and with razor-sharp edges and tip. They persist 10 to 15 years, so cover most of the tree except for the trunk and older branches. The bark is uncommonly thick, up to 15 cm (6 in) deep. The inner bark and resin from the trunk of the tree is reddish.

It is usually dioecious, with the male and female cones on separate trees, but occasionally there are also individuals who are monoecious. The male (pollen) cones are oblong, 6 cm (2.4 in) long at first, expanding to 10–18 cm (4–7 in) long by 15–25 mm (0.6–1.0 in) broad at pollen release. Like all conifers it is wind pollinated. The female cones (seed), which mature in autumn about 18 months after pollination, are globose, large, 18–25 cm (7–10 in) in diameter, and hold about 100–150 seeds. The cones disintegrate at maturity to release the approximately 5 cm (2 in) long nut-like seeds, which are then dispersed by animals, notably the azure jay(Cyanocorax caeruleus).

=== Similar species ===
It can be distinguished from its close relative A. araucana (found further southwest in South America), by its narrower leaves, seed with a much shorter bract scale, brown inner bark and white resin.

== Taxonomy ==
The genus Araucaria was part of terrestrial flora since the Triassic and found its apogee in Gondwana. Today, it is restricted to the Southern Hemisphere and has 19 species.

== Distribution and habitat ==
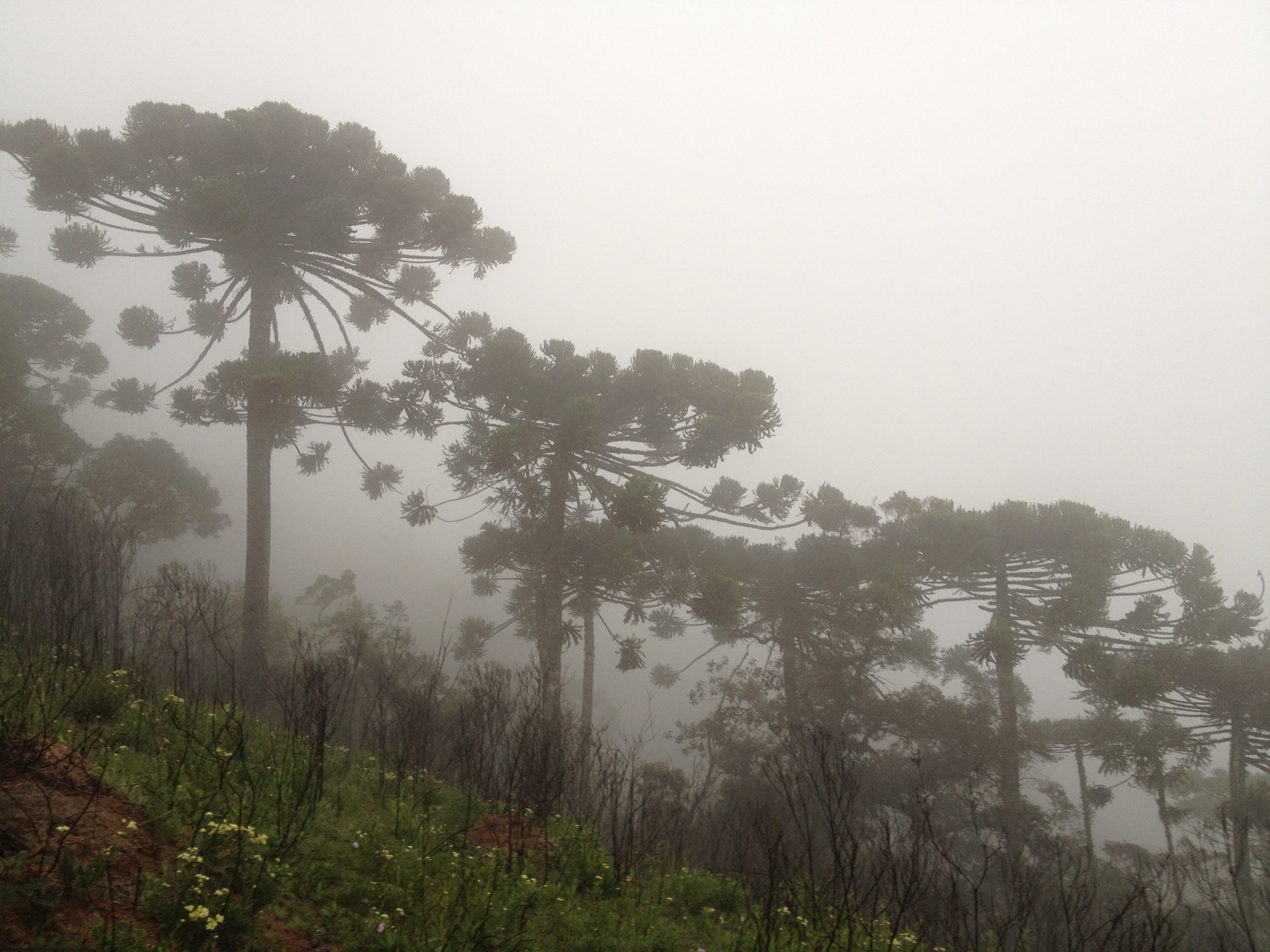
A. angustifolia in Campos do Jordão

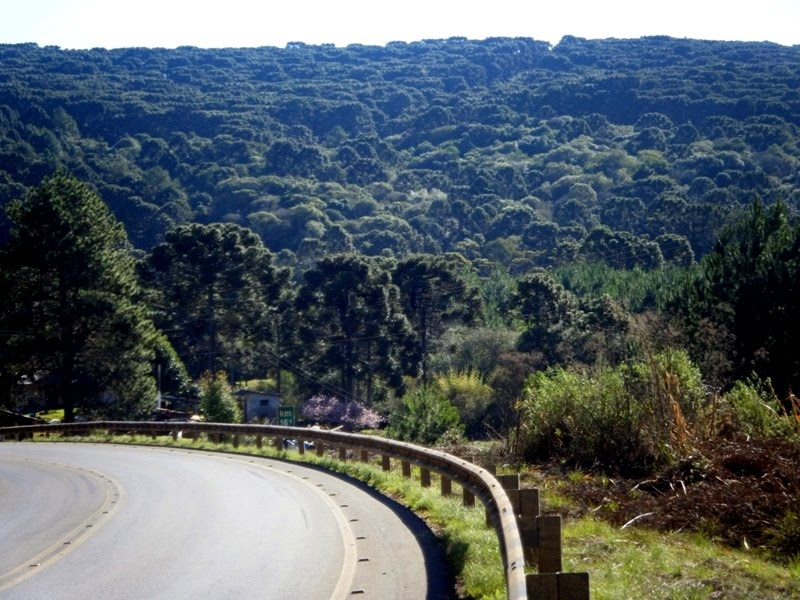
Araucarias at Floresta Nacional de Caçador, Santa Catarina, Brazil

The prehistoric distribution of A. angustifolia in earlier geologic periods was very different to the present day; fossils have been found in northeastern Brazil. The species moved into its present-day range in southern Brazil during the later Pleistocene and early Holocene. This chorological shift may possibly be due to climatic change and the migration of mountain flora by way of river courses. Around 149,000 years ago, the species’ distribution became divided into two separate Brazilian populations: one in Serra da Mantiqueira, which is smaller but exhibits higher genetic diversity, and another on the southern plateau, which underwent a range expansion around 4000 years ago, possibly associated with human activity. Covering an original area of 233,000 square kilometres (90,000 sq mi), it has now lost an estimated 97% of its habitat to logging, agriculture, and silviculture.

Besides southern Brazil, it is also found in high-altitude areas of southern Minas Gerais, in central Rio de Janeiro and in the east and south of São Paulo, but more typically in the states of Paraná, Santa Catarina and Rio Grande do Sul. According to a study made by Brazilian researcher Reinhard Maack, the original area of occurrence represented 36.67% of the Paraná state (73,088 km^{2} or 28,219 sq mi), 60.13% of the Santa Catarina state (57,332 km^{2} or 22,136 sq mi), 21.6% of the São Paulo state (53,613 km^{2} or 20,700 sq mi) and 17.38% of the Rio Grande do Sul state (48,968 km^{2} or 18,907 sq mi). It is also found in the northeast of Argentina (Misiones and Corrientes), locally in Paraguay (Alto Paraná), growing in low mountains at altitudes of 500–1,800 metres (1,600–5,900 ft) and in northern regions of Uruguay where it was thought to be extinct until recent discoveries.

It prefers well drained, slightly acidic soil but will tolerate almost any soil type provided drainage is good. It requires a subtropical/temperate climate with abundant rainfall, tolerating occasional frosts down to about −5 to −20 °C (23 to −4 °F).

== Ecology ==
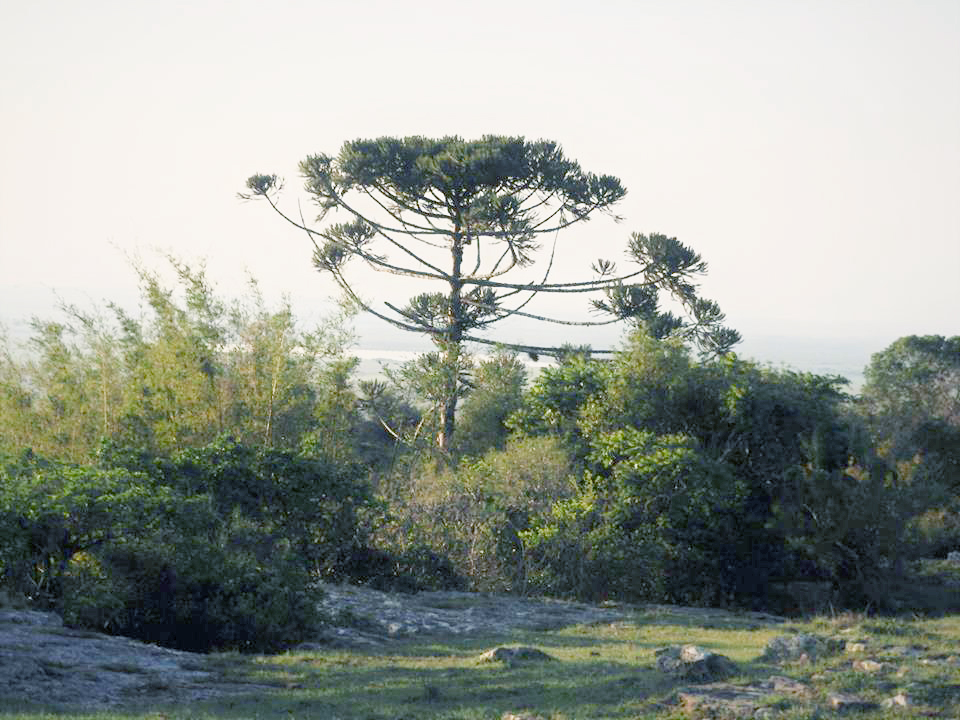
Araucaria angustifolia in Cerro Largo, Uruguay

The seeds are very important for the native animals. Several mammals and birds eat the pinhão, and it has an important ecological role in Araucaria moist forests (a sub-type of the Brazilian Atlantic Forest).

In a long term study observing the feeding behaviour throughout the year of the squirrel Guerlinguetus brasiliensis ingrami in a secondary A. angustifolia forest in the Parque Recreativo Primavera in the vicinity of the city of Curitiba, Paraná, of the ten plant species of which the squirrel ate the seeds or nuts, seeds of A. angustifolia were the most important food item in the fall, with a significant percentage of their diet in the winter consisting of the seeds as well.

The squirrels cache seeds, but it is unclear how this affects recruitment.

== Conservation ==
According to one calculation it has lost an estimated 97% of its habitat to logging, agriculture, and silviculture in the last century. People also eat the seeds, which may reduce recruitment. It was therefore listed by the IUCN as a vulnerable species in 1998 and critically endangered in 2008.

== Uses ==
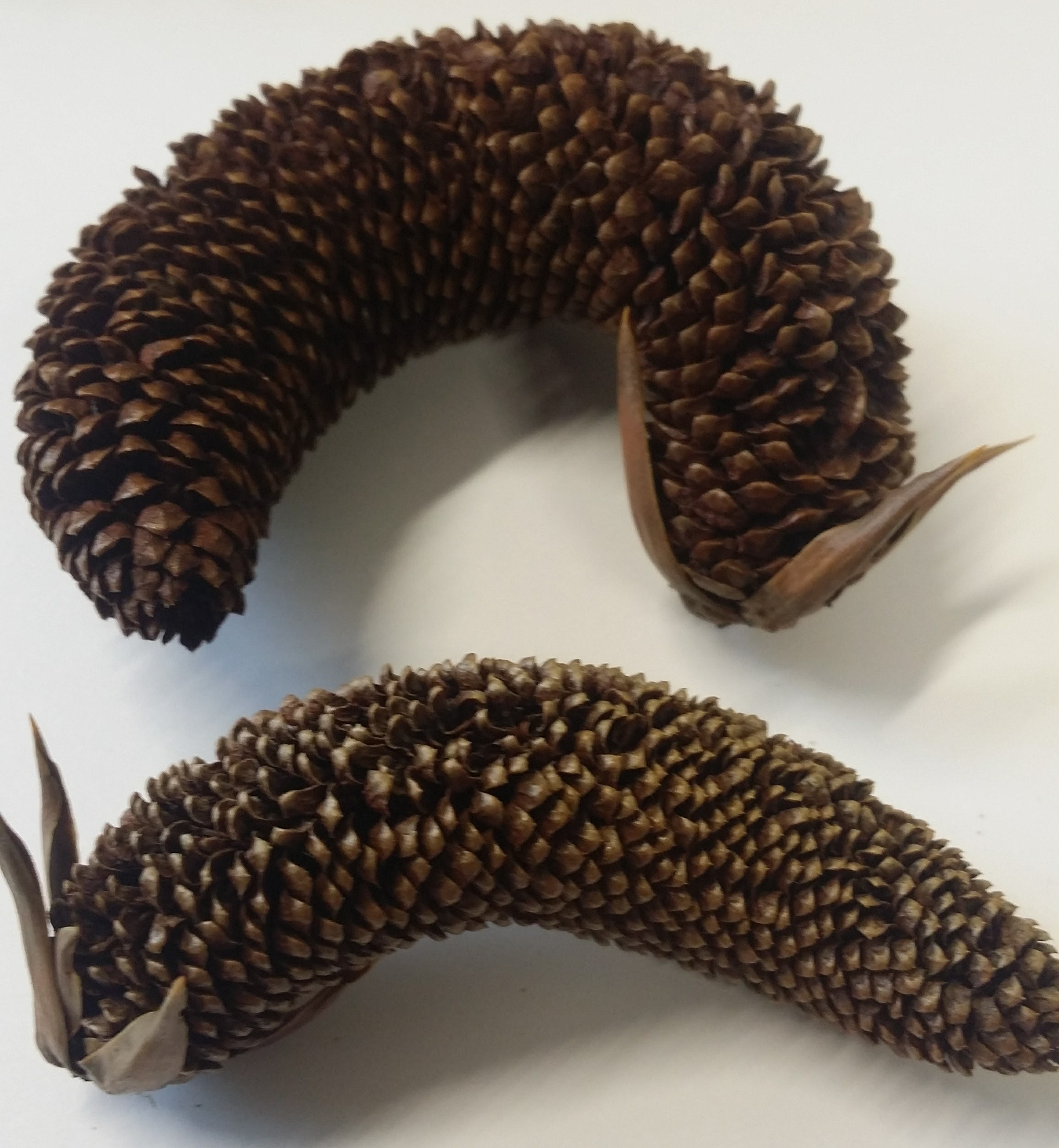
Dry male cones

Araucaria angustifolia is a popular garden tree in subtropical areas, planted for its unusual effect of the thick, 'reptilian' branches with a very symmetrical appearance.

It is also used as a softwood timber in stair treads and joinery. The species is widely used in folk medicine.

While A. angustifolia is a main species and dominant in South Brazil, it's also grown as an ornamental plant in parks of towns and cities of Chile, from Santiago to Valdivia. It grows better in low altitudes than the local Araucaria araucana, hence its use as a substitute in the Central Valley and coastal regions of Chile. In some places like the town of Melipeuco A. angustifolia can be seen growing side by side with A. araucana.

=== Food ===
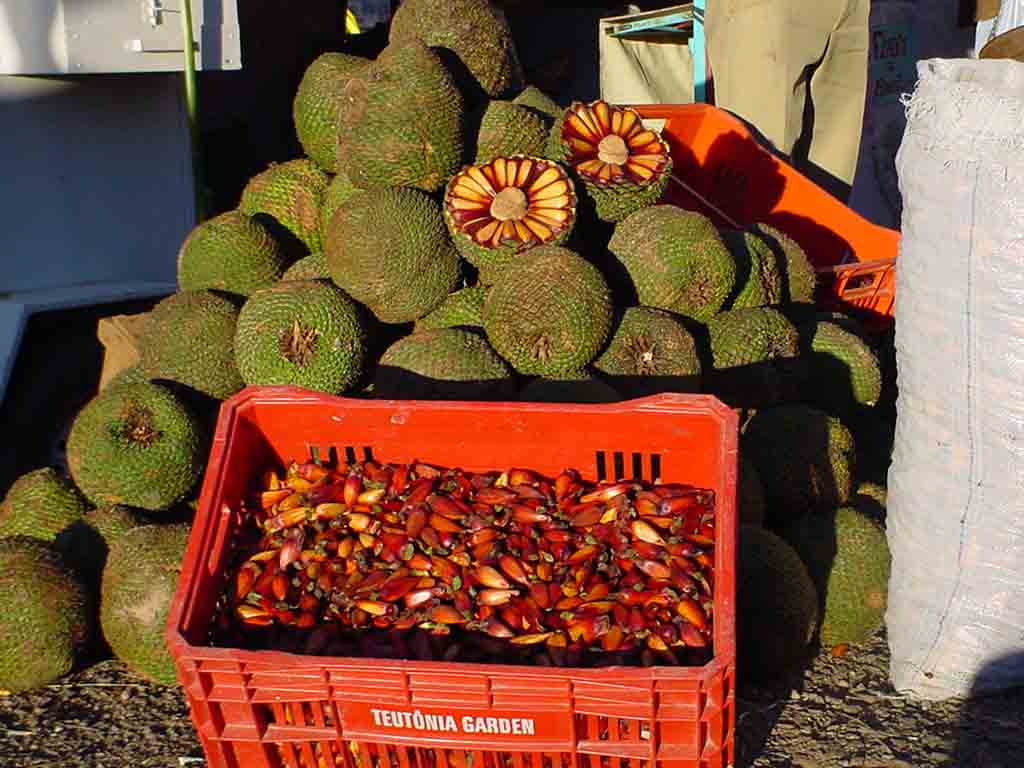
Araucaria angustifolia cones (pinhas) and nuts (pinhões)

Boiled and shelled piñones (Araucaria angustifolia)

The seeds of A. angustifolia, similar to large pine nuts, are edible, and are extensively harvested in southern Brazil (Paraná, Santa Catarina and Rio Grande do Sul states), an occupation particularly important for the region's small population of natives (the Kaingáng and other Southern Jê). The seeds, called pinhão [piˈɲɐ̃w] are popular as a winter snack. The city of Lages, in Santa Catarina, holds a popular pinhão fair, in which mulled wine and boiled Araucaria seeds are consumed. 3,400 tonnes (7,500,000 lb) of seeds are collected annually in Brazil.

== Hybrid ==
The hybrid Araucaria angustifolia × araucana is thought to have first arisen "in a plantation forestry environment in Argentina sometime in the late 19th or early 20th century". It is thus not a natural hybrid as there are more than 1000 km between the natural stands of the two species.
