= Libertador General San Martín Department =

Libertador General San Martín Department may refer to:

- Libertador General San Martín Department, Misiones
- Libertador General San Martín Department, Chaco
- Libertador General San Martín Department, San Luis
