= Caraguatay =

Caraguatay may refer to:

- Caraguatay, Misiones, Argentina
- Caraguatay, Paraguay
- Caraguatay District, Paraguay
