= Montecarlo Department =

Montecarlo Departamento Montecarlo
- Department
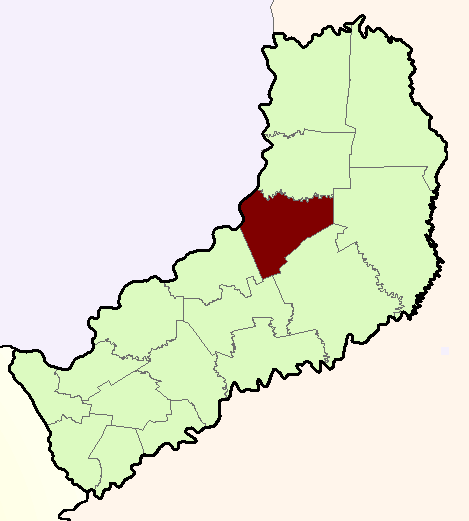
- Interactive map of Montecarlo
- Country: Argentina
- Seat: Montecarlo

Area
  - Total: 1,723 km^{2} (665 sq mi)

Population (2022)
  - Total: 38,669
  - Density: 22.44/km^{2} (58.13/sq mi)

Montecarlo is a department of the province of Misiones (Argentina). It borders the departments of Eldorado, Guaraní, Libertador General San Martín, San Pedro, and the Republic of Paraguay. The department has an area of 1,770 square kilometers, which is equivalent to 5.95% of the total area of the province. Its population is 38,317, according to the 2022 census (INDEC).
