= Caraguatay, Misiones =

Caraguatay (Argentina)
- Municipality and village
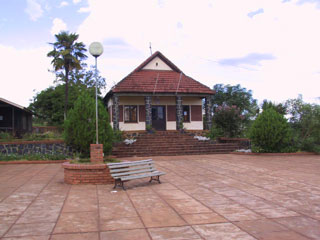
- Center in Caraguatay, Misiones Argentina

- Location within Misiones Province Location within Argentina
- Country: Argentina
- Province: Misiones Province
- Time zone: UTC−3 (ART)

Caraguatay (Argentina) is an Argentine town and municipality located in the Montecarlo Department of the Province of Misiones.

Although the town had been settled since 1909, it was not until 1940 that the first Development Commission was formed. At the beginning of the 21st century, the main sources of income are the cultivation of yerba mate, forestry, and increasingly, livestock farming.

In Puerto Caraguatay, the house where Ernesto Guevara Lynch and Celia de la Serna lived while she was pregnant with who would later be known as Che Guevara, still exists today. Near this town, they owned a yerba mate plantation, and thus the guerrilla fighter spent the first years of his childhood in this town. Today, a museum operates in the house that belonged to Ernesto Guevara Lynch, father of the aforementioned figure.

== Toponymy ==
Its name comes from the Guarani language: caraguatá (correctly written as "karaguata") is a type of bromeliad plant, and "y" means water. It could be translated as "Water Karaguata" (Karaguatay).

== Demographics ==
The municipality has a population of 3,378 inhabitants, according to the 2010 census (INDEC). The urban center of Tarumá is also located within the municipality.
