= Gobernador López =

Coordinates: 27°40′S 55°15′W

- Municipality and village
- Interactive map of Gobernador López
- Country: Argentina
- Province: Misiones Province
- Time zone: UTC−3 (ART)

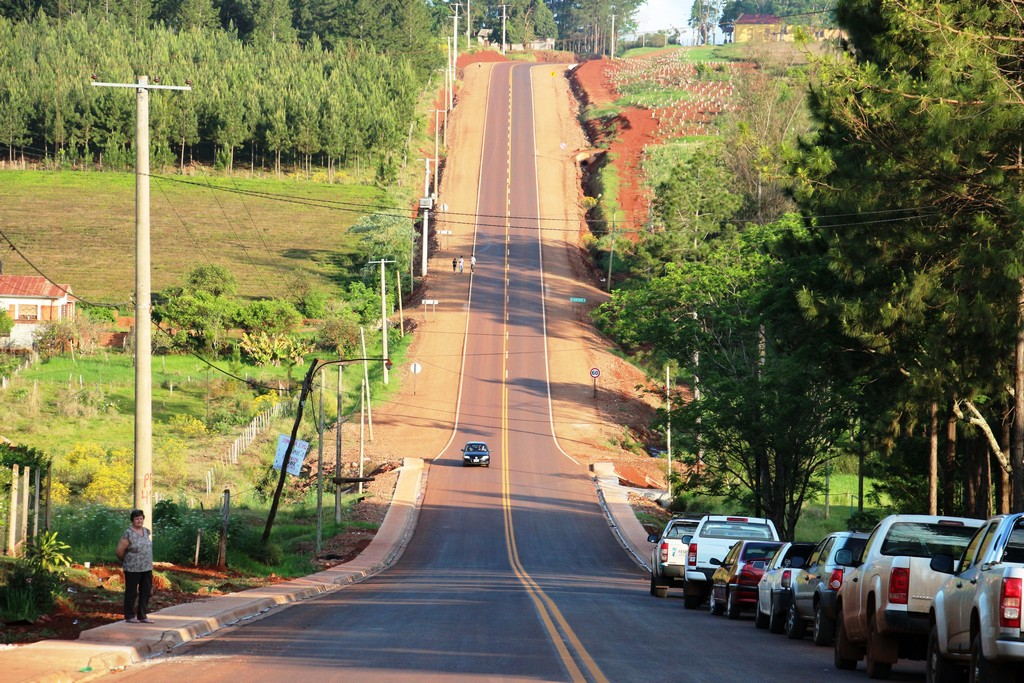
Gobernador López

Gobernador López is a village and municipality in Misiones Province in north-eastern Argentina.
