= Alba Posse =

- Municipality and village
- Location in Argentina Alba Posse (Argentina)
- Coordinates: 27°34′9″S 54°41′3″W
- Country: Argentina
- Province: Misiones
- Department: 25 de Mayo
- Founder: Rodolfo Alba Posse

Government
  - Mayor: Nelson Carvalho

Area
  - Land: 156 sq mi (405 km^{2})

Population (2001)
  - Total: 481
  - Density: 44/sq mi (17/km^{2})
- Time zone: UTC−3 (ART)
- Postal code: 3363
- Area code: 3755
- Climate: Cfa

Alba Posse is a village and municipality in Misiones Province in north-eastern Argentina.

== Geography ==
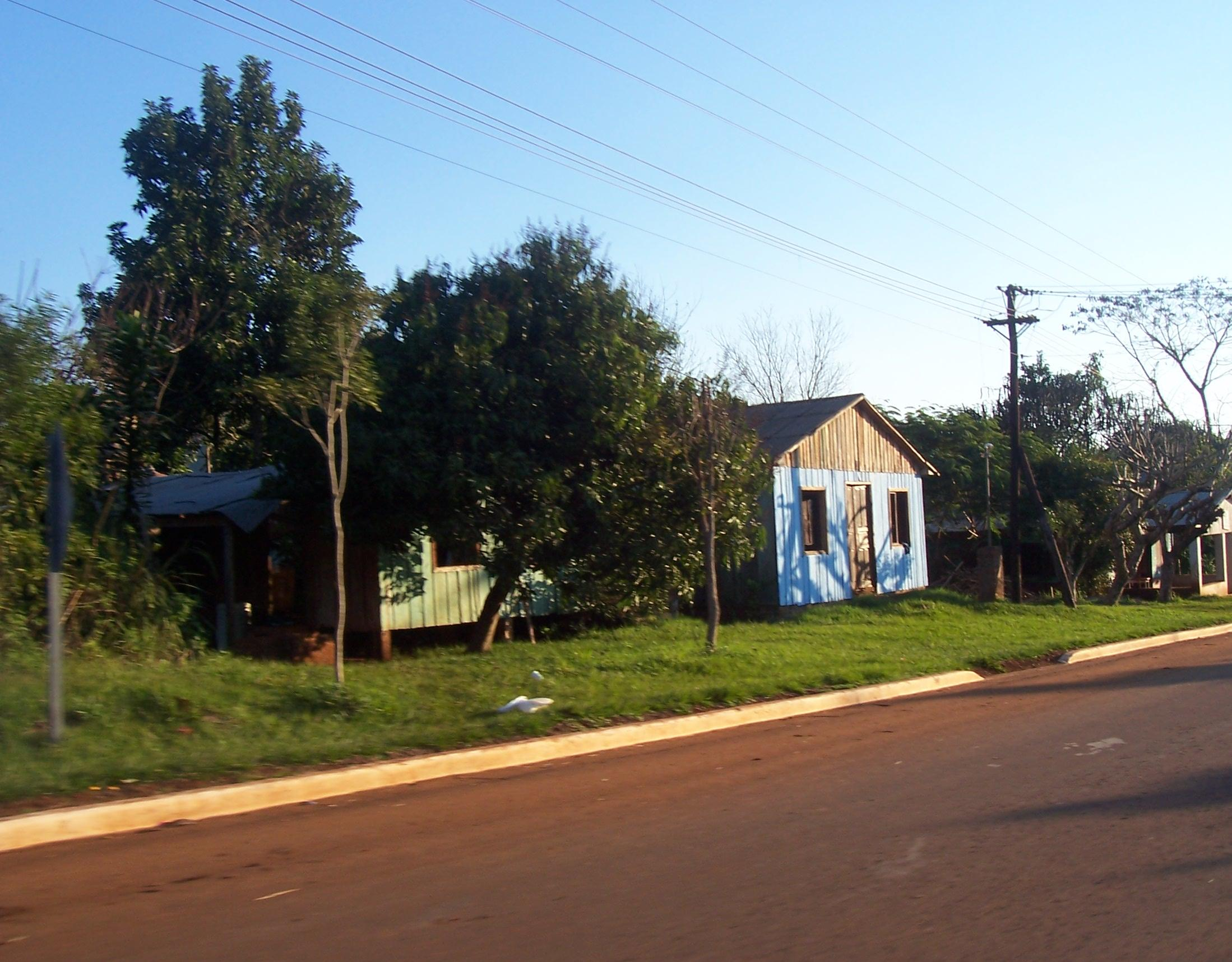
Alba Posse Street.

The city is located on the banks of the Uruguay River, opposite the Brazilian town of Porto Maua, which can be reached by ferry and boat services. Currently there is a project that plans to build a bridge to facilitate communication between the two countries. Access is via Provincial Highway 103, which in turn communicates with National Route 14.

== Economy ==
The main industry is agriculture. Cassava, tobacco, citrus, tea and aromatic herbs are grown, in addition to logging, and cattle and pig rearing.

== Population ==
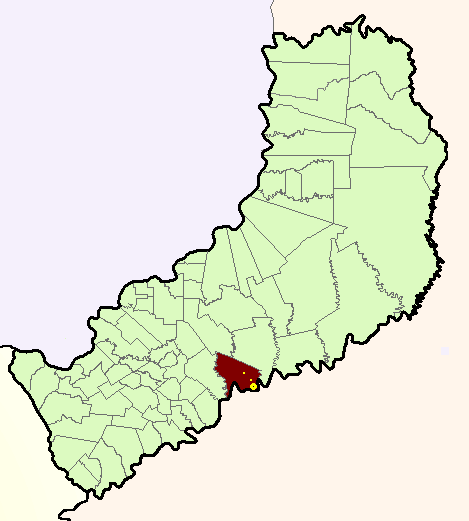
Municipality of Alba Posse in the province of Misiones; the small points represent the localities of Santa Rita (south) and San Francisco de Asís (north).

The name comes from its founder, Agronomist Rodolfo Alba Posse. Within the municipality there are also the towns of Santa Rita and San Francisco de Asis. In 2001 Santa Rita had a population exceeding that of Alba Posse. Alba Posse had 481 inhabitants (INDEC, 2001), which represented a 6.2% increase over the previous population of 453 inhabitants (INDEC, 1991) of the previous census.
