= Gobernador Roca =

Coordinates: 27°11′S 55°28′W

- Municipality and village
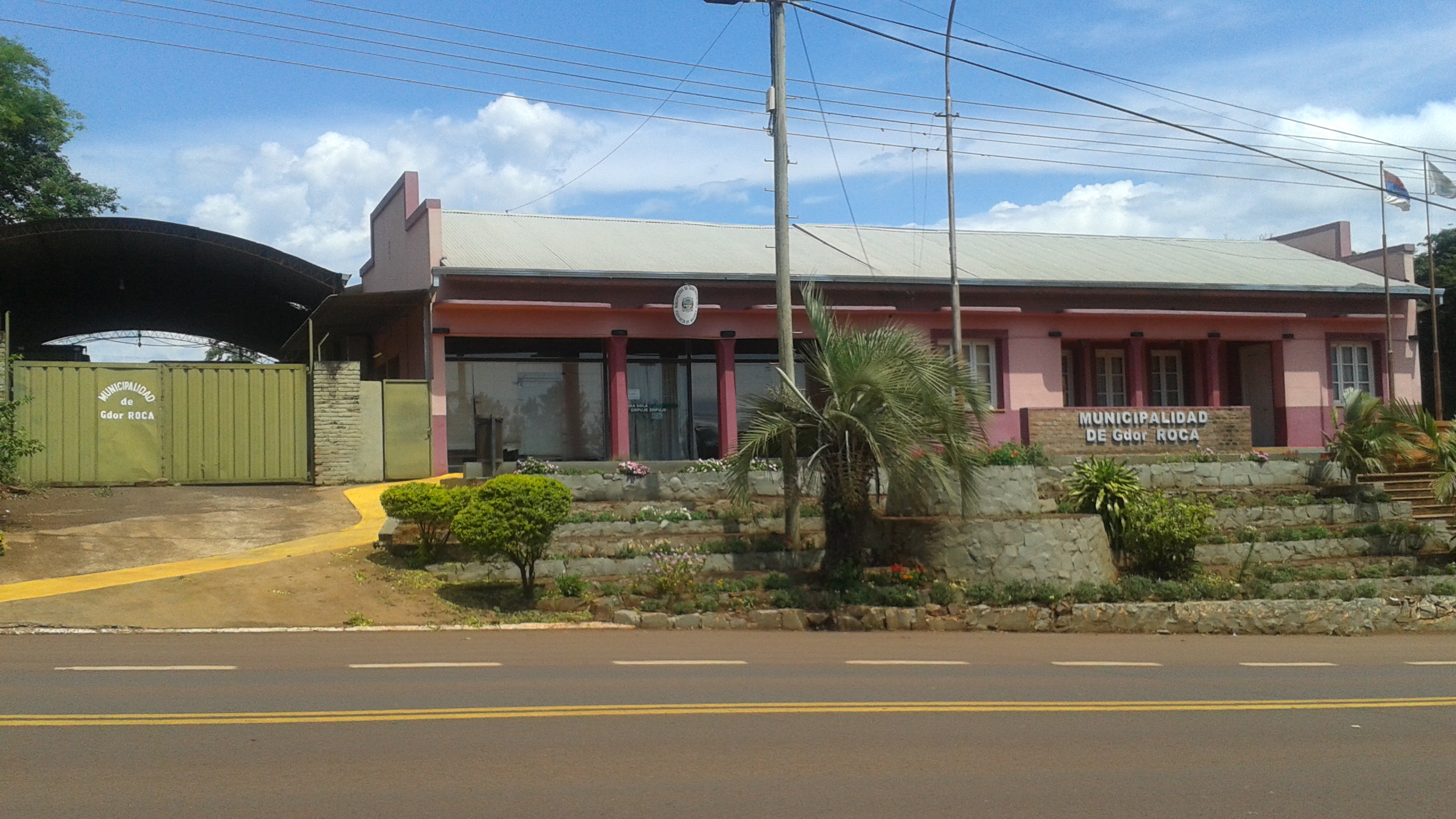
- Interactive map of Gobernador Roca
- Country: Argentina
- Province: Misiones Province
- Time zone: UTC−3 (ART)

Gobernador Roca is a village and municipality in Misiones Province in north-eastern Argentina.
