= Colonia Aurora =

- Municipality and village
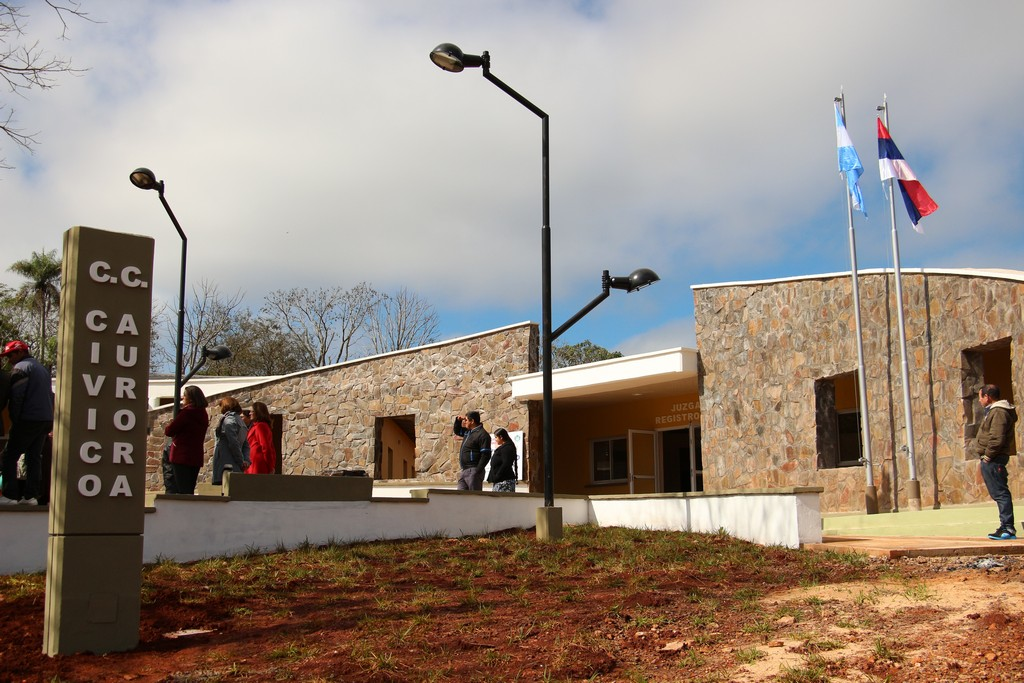

- Location within Misiones Province
- Country: Argentina
- Province: Misiones Province
- Time zone: UTC−3 (ART)

Colonia Aurora is a village and municipality in Misiones Province in north-eastern Argentina.
