= Colonia Polana =

- Municipality and village
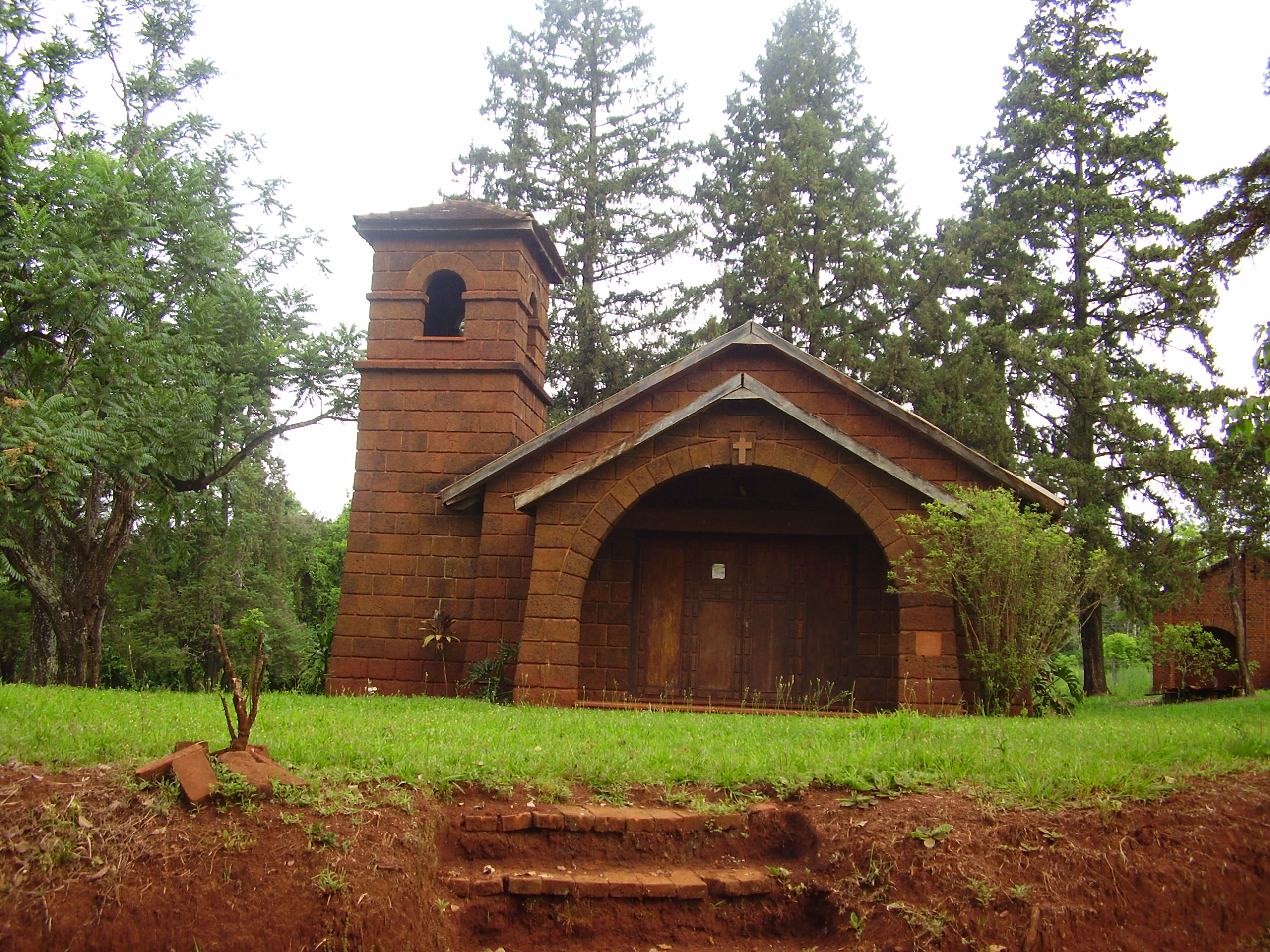

- Location within Misiones Province Location within Argentina
- Country: Argentina
- Province: Misiones Province

Population
  - Total: 97
- Time zone: UTC−3 (ART)
- Postal code: 3326

Colonia Polana is a village and municipality in Misiones Province in north-eastern Argentina founded in 1900 by English immigrants.
