= Eldorado, Misiones =

Eldorado
- City
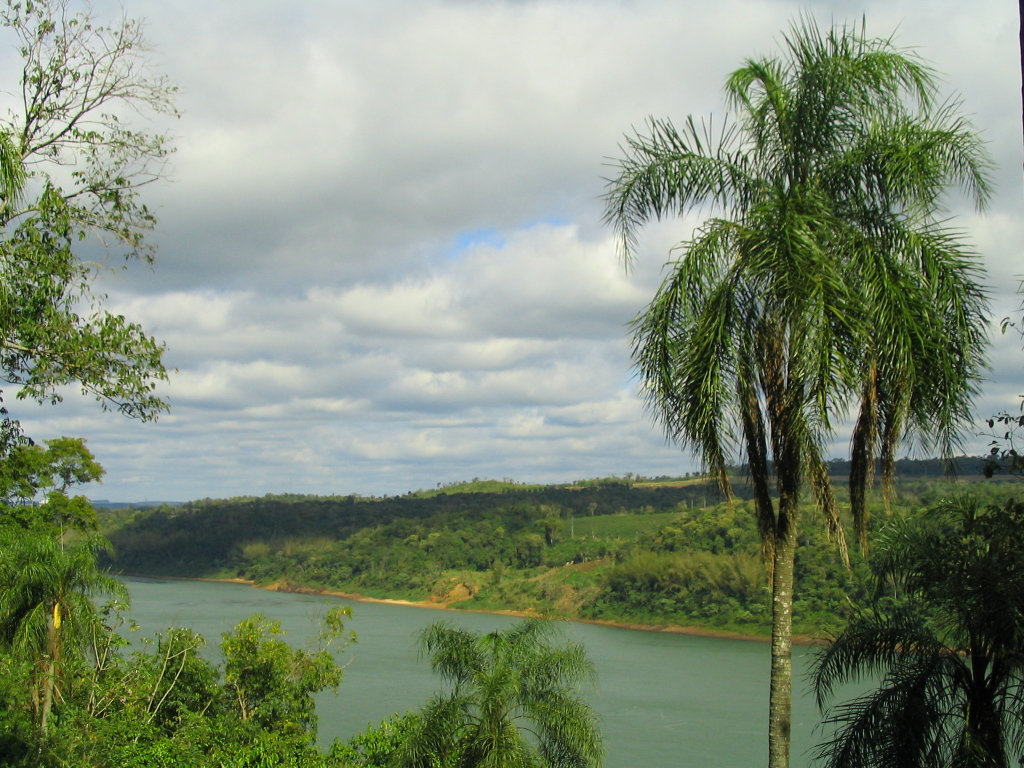

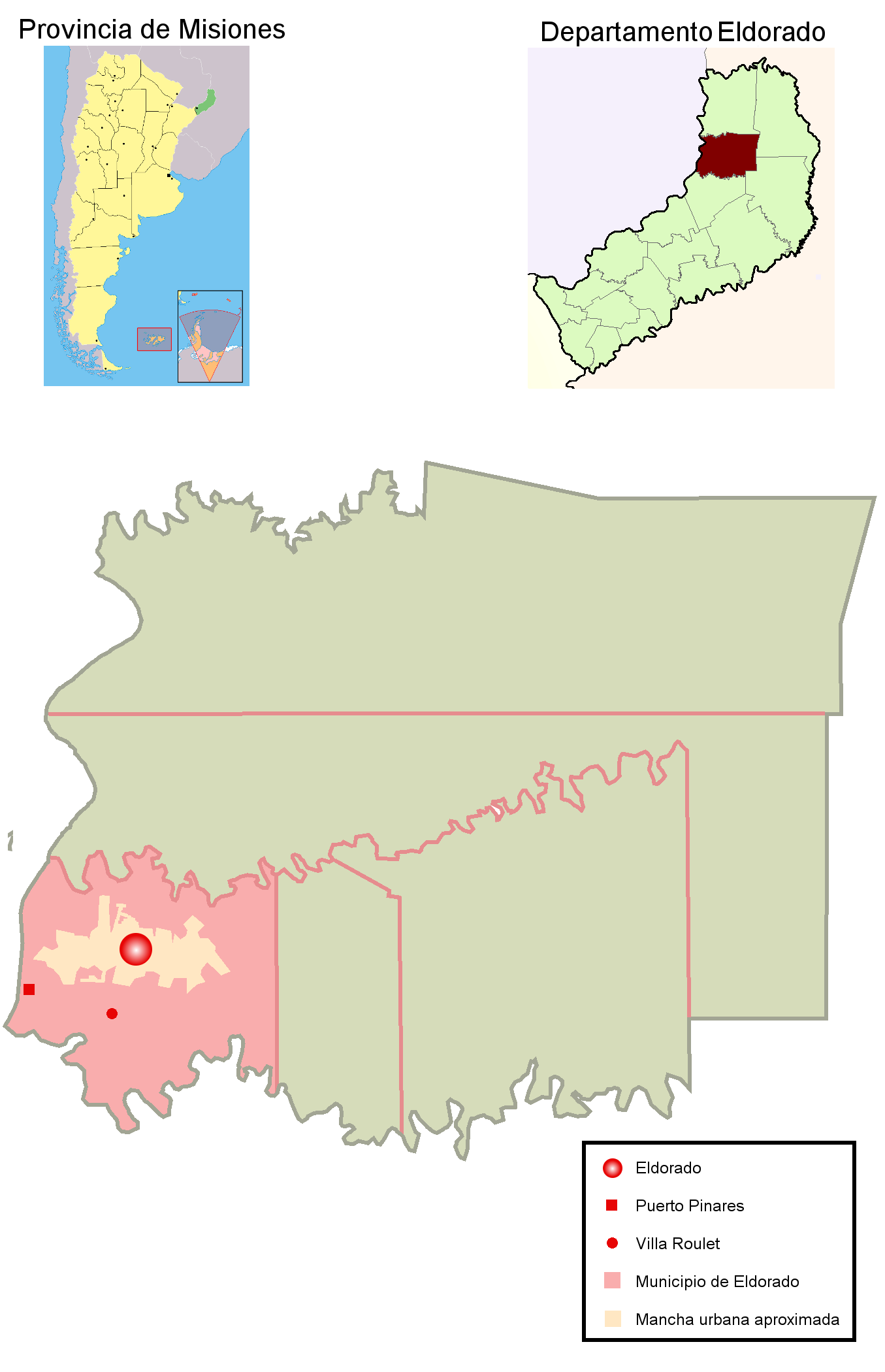

- Location of Eldorado in Misiones Province and Argentina Eldorado (Argentina)
- Coordinates: 26°24′S 54°38′W
- Country: Argentina
- Province: Misiones
- Department: Eldorado
- Founded: September 29, 1919
- Founder: Julio Adolfo Schwelm

Government
  - Intendant: Rodrigo Durán
- Elevation: 228 m (748 ft)

Population (2010 census)
  - Total: 57,323
- Time zone: UTC−3 (ART)
- CPA base: N3380
- Dialing code: +54 3751
- Website: Official website

Eldorado is a city in the center-northeast of the province of Misiones, Argentina. It has 54,189 inhabitants as per the 2001 census [INDEC], making it the third most populated city in the province. It is the head town of the Eldorado Department. It is located on the left-hand (eastern) banks of the Upper Paraná River, on National Route 12, about 100km from the Iguazú Falls and 206km from the provincial capital Posadas, on the Argentina-Paraguay border.

Eldorado was founded on 29 September 1919 as a rural settlement and a port on the Paraná by German-born Adolfo Julius Schwelm, naturalised British subject, who named it as a reference to the legend of El Dorado. The town was the center of the European immigrant colonization of the area (which included groups of people from Germany, Switzerland, Poland, Denmark, England, and others).

The region's economy is based on agriculture, producing tung, oranges, grapefruit and yerba mate. Tourism also plays a part, with main activities being sailing, sports fishing (golden dorado), and sports hunting (tapir, deer, wild boars). Eldorado has an airport.

== Towns and villages ==
- 9 de Julio (Misiones)
