= Campo Ramón =

- Municipality and village
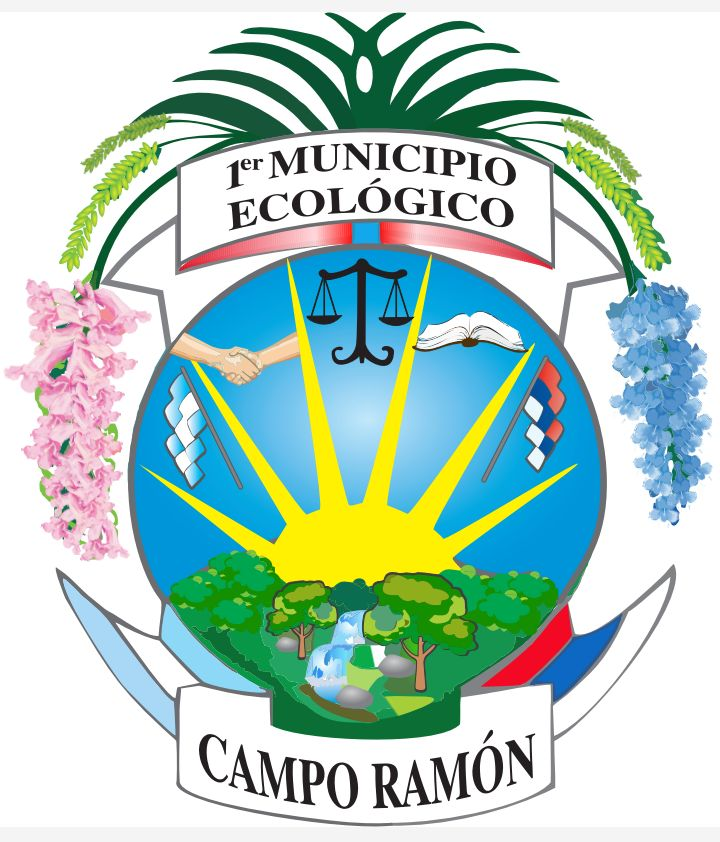
- Flag Coat of arms

- Location within Misiones Province Location within Argentina
- Country: Argentina
- Province: Misiones Province
- Time zone: UTC−3 (ART)

Campo Ramón is a village and municipality in Misiones Province in north-eastern Argentina.
