= Puerto Piray =

- Municipality and village
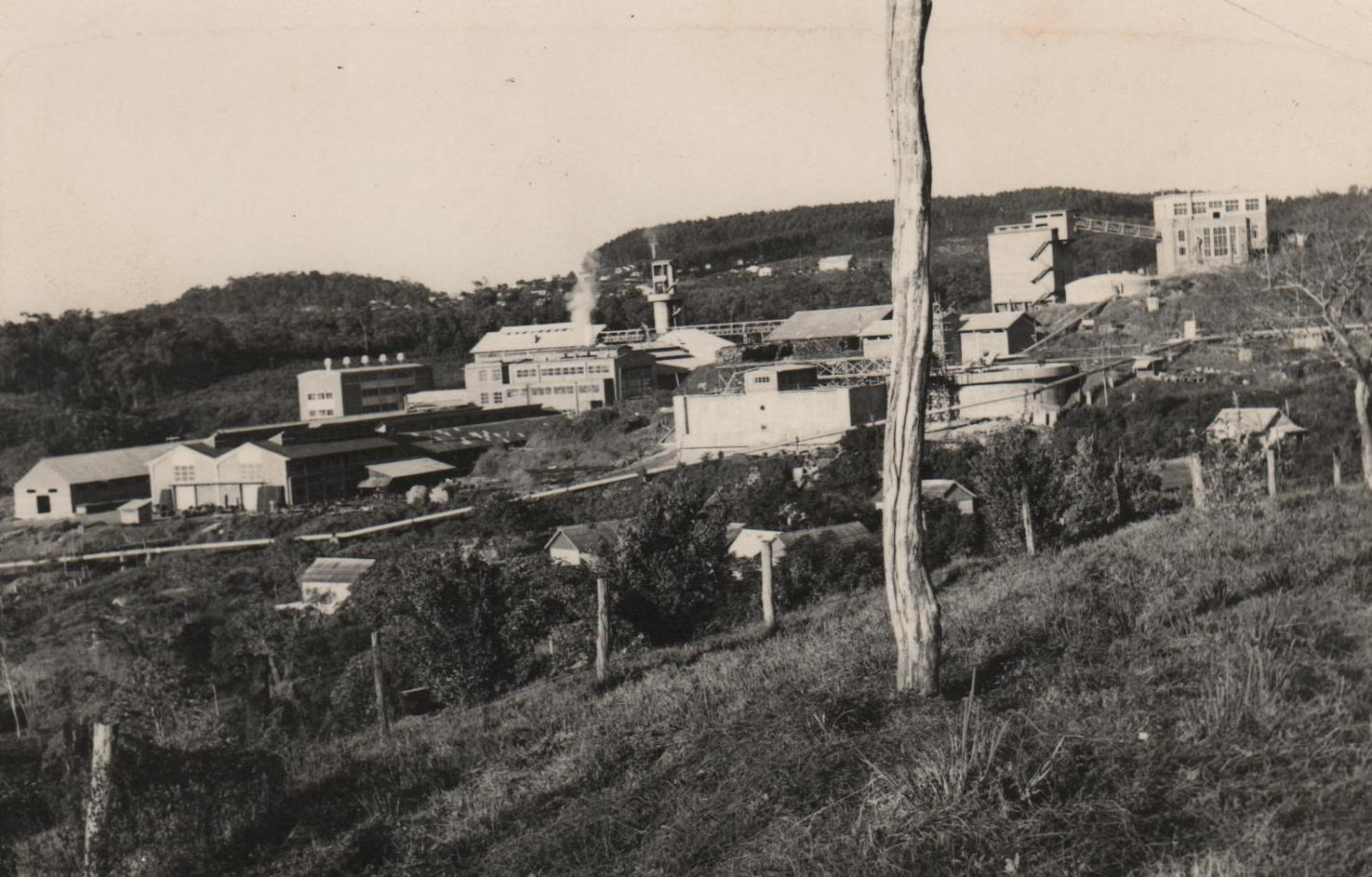
- Puerto Piray in 1960

- Location within Misiones Province Location within Argentina
- Country: Argentina
- Province: Misiones Province
- Time zone: UTC−3 (ART)

Puerto Piray is a village and municipality in Misiones Province in north-eastern Argentina.
