= Veinticinco de Mayo Department, Misiones =

Veinticinco de Mayo Departamento Veinticinco de Mayo
- Department
- Interactive map of Veinticinco de Mayo
- Country: Argentina
- Seat: Alba Posse

Area
  - Total: 1,639 km^{2} (633 sq mi)

Population (2022)
  - Total: 30,891
  - Density: 18.85/km^{2} (48.81/sq mi)

Veinticinco de Mayo is a department of the province of Misiones (Argentina).
