= Guaraní Department =

Guaraní Departamento Guaraní
- Department
- Interactive map of Guaraní
- Coordinates: 27°00′S 54°15′W
- Country: Argentina
- Seat: El Soberbio

Area
  - Total: 3,314 km^{2} (1,280 sq mi)

Population (2022)
  - Total: 77,160
  - Density: 23.28/km^{2} (60.30/sq mi)

Guaraní is a department of Misiones Province (Argentina).
