= Eldorado Department =

Department in Misiones Province, Argentina with Jesuit ruins

Coordinates: 26°24′04″S 54°37′07″W

Eldorado Departamento Eldorado
- Department
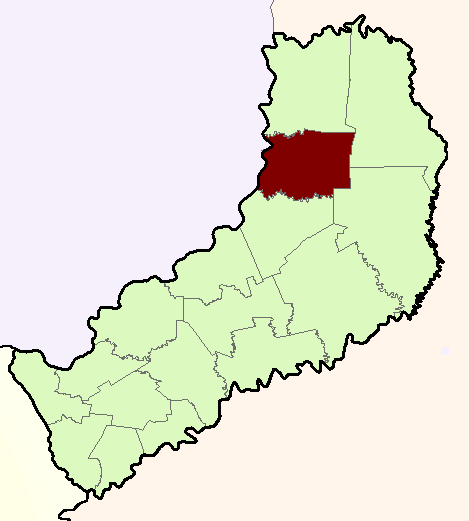
- Interactive map of Eldorado
- Country: Argentina

Area
  - Total: 1,960 km^{2} (760 sq mi)

Population (2022)
  - Total: 91,728
  - Density: 46.8/km^{2} (121/sq mi)

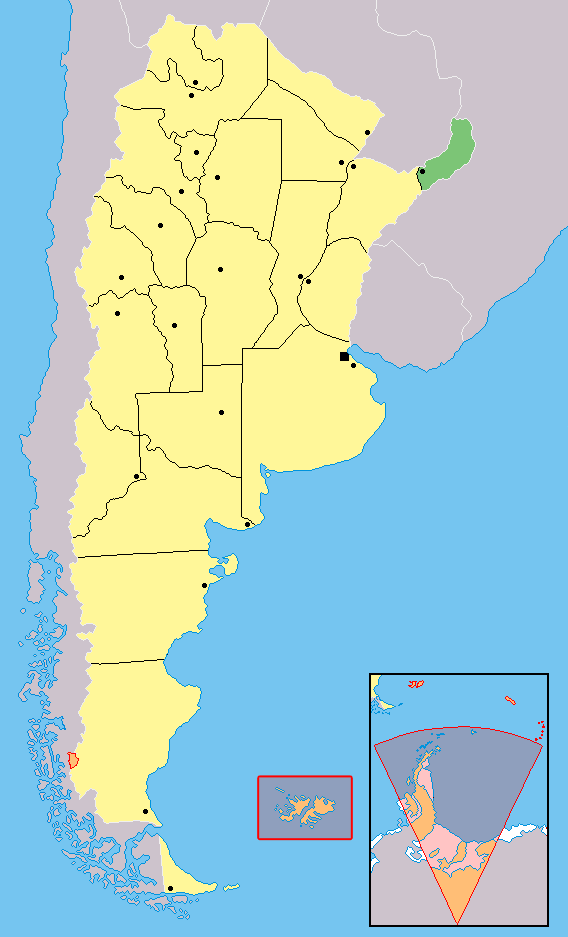

Eldorado is a department located in the northwest of the province of Misiones Province, Argentina. In borders the departments of Iguazú, General Manuel Belgrano, San Pedro, Montecarlo, and to the west the Republic of Paraguay, separated by the Paraná River.

== Area ==
Eldorado is a town of about 70,000 people. Located in the north of Misiones, Argentina, one hour from Iguazú and two hours from Posadas (the regional capital), it relied largely on sawmills in the area for its economy, but many independent sawmill operators were put out of business or bought out by a firm called Alto Parana with backing from its Chilean parent company.

Throughout the region there are many Jesuit ruins.

Misiones itself has been made famous by the film The Mission.

== Population ==
Its population was 91,728 inhabitants according to the 2022 census (INDEC), compared to 78,221 inhabitants in the previous 2010 census, representing an increase of 17,3% higher than the provincial growth of 16,1%. These figures made it the fourth most populated department and the third highest in population density in the province.
