= Libertador General San Martín Department, Misiones =

Libertador General San Martín Departamento Libertador General San Martín
- Department
- Interactive map of Libertador General San Martín
- Country: Argentina
- Seat: Puerto Rico

Area
  - Total: 1,524 km^{2} (588 sq mi)

Population (2022)
  - Total: 52,428
  - Density: 34.40/km^{2} (89.10/sq mi)

Libertador General San Martín is a department of the province of Misiones (Argentina).
