= Misiones Province =

Province of Argentina

Misiones
- Province
- Province of Misiones; Provincia de Misiones (Spanish)
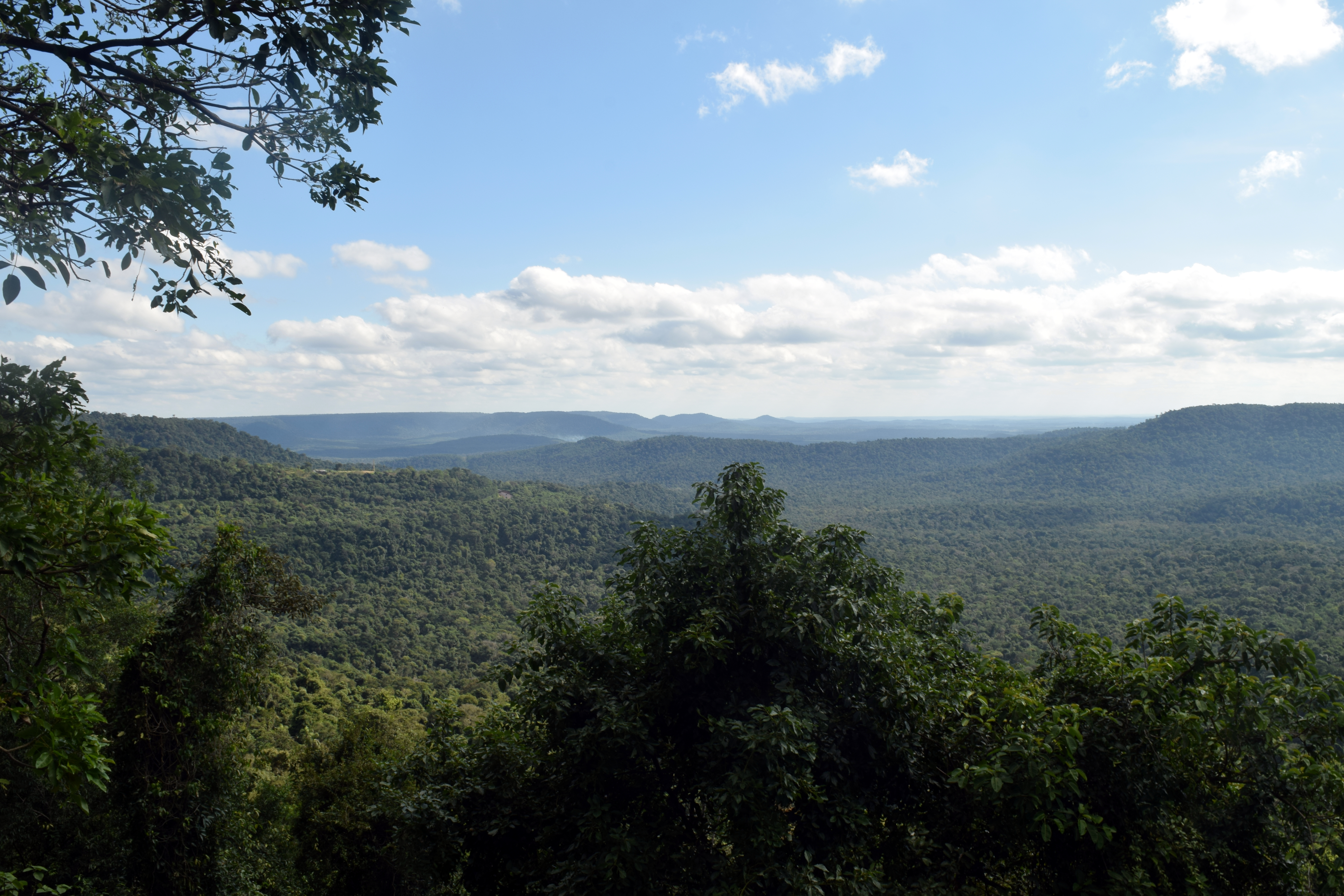
- View of the Alto Paraná Atlantic forests

- Flag Coat of arms
- Anthem: Misionerita (The Song for the Child of Misiones)
- Location of Misiones within Argentina
- Coordinates: 26.92°S 54.52°W
- Country: Argentina
- Capital: Posadas
- Subdivisions: List: Departments: 17; Municipalities: 78

Government
  - Governor: Hugo Passalacqua (FRC)
  - Vice Governor: Lucas Romero Spinelli (FRC)
  - Legislature: 40
  - National Deputies: 7
  - National Senators: Carlos Omar Arce (FRC); Enrique Goerling Lara (PRO); Sonia Rojas Decut (FRC)

Area Ranked 21st
  - Total: 29,801 km^{2} (11,506 sq mi)

Population (2022 census)
  - Total: 1,280,960
  - Rank: 9th
  - Density: 42.984/km^{2} (111.33/sq mi)
- Demonym: misionero

GDP
  - Total: peso 445 billion (US$17 billion) (2018)
- Time zone: UTC−3 (ART)
- ISO 3166 code: AR-N
- HDI (2021): 0.842 very high (11th)
- Website: www.misiones.gov.ar

Misiones (Spanish pronunciation: [miˈsjones], 'Missions') is one of the 23 provinces of Argentina, located in the northeastern corner of the country in the Mesopotamia region. It is surrounded by Paraguay to the northwest, Brazil to the north, east and south, and Corrientes Province of Argentina to the southwest.

This was an early area of Roman Catholic missionary activity by the Jesuits in what was then called the province of Paraguay, beginning in the early 17th century. In 1984, the ruins of four mission sites in Argentina were designated World Heritage Sites by UNESCO.

== History ==
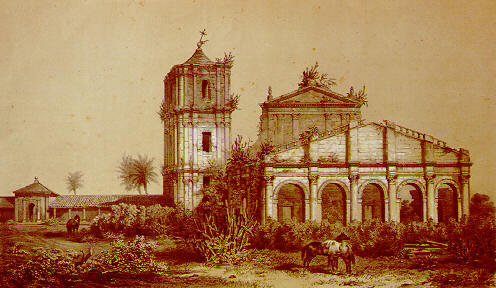
1846 impression of San Ignacio Miní, a Jesuit Reduction, abandoned following the temporary abolition of the order in 1773

Indigenous peoples of various tribes lived in the area of the future province for thousands of years. At the time of European encounter, the area was occupied by the Kaingang and Xokleng tribes, later followed by the Guarani tribe. The first European to visit the region, Sebastian Cabot, discovered Apipé Falls while navigating the Paraná River in December 1527. In 1541 Álvar Núñez Cabeza de Vaca reached the Iguazú Falls.

In the 17th century, members of the Society of Jesus came to the region as missionaries, initially led by Diego de Torres Bello (1551–1638). From 1609 onwards the Jesuits established a string of Jesuit Reductions, most notably that of San Ignacio (founded in 1610). In a few years they set up 30 mission villages. They taught the Guarani western-style agriculture and crafts. Their crafts were sold and traded along the river and they shared in the Reductions' prosperity.

In 1759 the Portuguese government, at the insistence of its anti-Jesuit Secretary of State, the Marquis de Pombal, ordered all Reductions closed in its territory (which then included much of present-day Misiones Province). The Marquis eventually prevailed in 1773 on Pope Clement XIV to have the Jesuit Order suppressed. With the abandoning of the missions, the prosperous trade surrounding these Reductions quickly vanished. Colonists imposed a brutal plantation economy in the region, forcing the Guarani to act as slave labor.

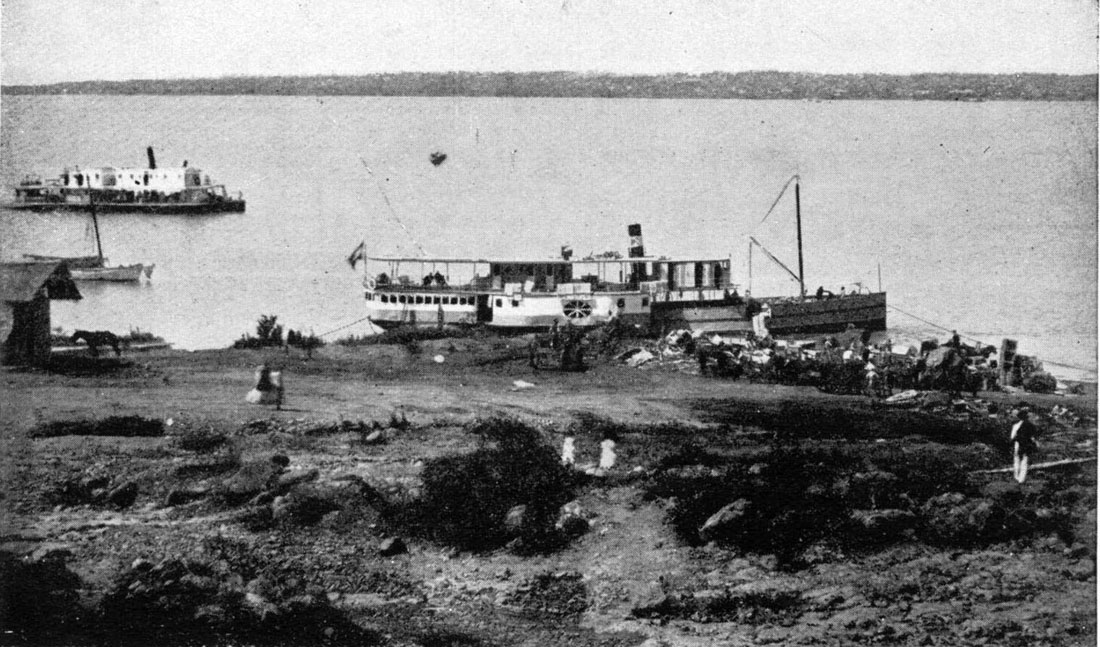
Steamer on the riverbank at Posadas in 1892

In 1814, Gervasio Posadas, the Director of the United Provinces of the Río de la Plata, declared Misiones annexed to Argentina's Corrientes (at this time Argentina was quasi-independent but nominally still a Spanish colony). Argentina did not exert de facto control over Misiones, which was claimed by several countries and effectively governed itself. In 1830 Argentine military forces from Corrientes Province took control of Misiones.

In 1838, Paraguay occupied Misiones, claiming the area on the basis that the Misiones population consisted of indigenous Guarani, the major ethnic group of Paraguay. In 1865, Paraguayan forces invaded Misiones again in what became the War of the Triple Alliance (1864–1870). Following the defeat of Paraguay and its peace agreement with Argentina (eventually signed in 1876), Paraguay gave up its claim to the Misiones territory.

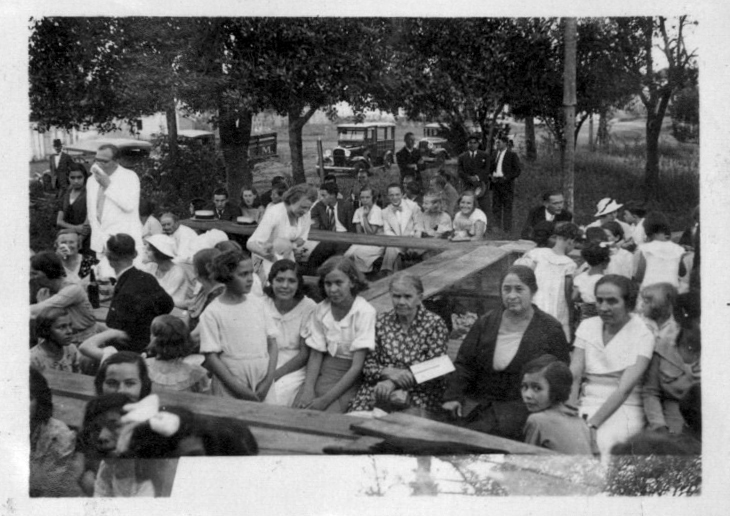
Argentines in Misiones at the beginning of the 20th century

Although Argentina had claimed Misiones since 1814, academics tend to interpret Argentine possession of Misiones as beginning with the defeat of Paraguay in the War of the Triple Alliance. John Lynch writes that "the treaty of alliance [i.e. against Paraguay] contained secret clauses providing for the annexation of disputed territory in northern Paraguay by Brazil and regions in the east and west of Paraguay by Argentina [...]. After a long and harrowing war (1865–70), Argentina prised from a prostrate Paraguay territory in Misiones between the Paraná and the Uruguay and other land further west." Scobie states that "the political status of Misiones remained vague" and that Argentina gained the region "as a by-product of the Paraguayan war in the 1860s".

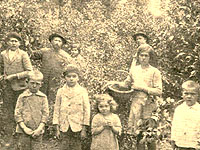
Ukrainian immigrants harvest yerba mate in 1920. Despite challenging conditions, Misiones attracted considerable European immigration in the early 20th-century

The War of the Triple Alliance left Paraguay much impoverished, and Misiones benefited economically from belonging to Argentina. In 1876 the Argentine President Nicolás Avellaneda, assisted by his close friend, General Pietro Canestro (an Italian nobleman who devoted much of his life and wealth to the achievement and sustainability of the peace in the region), proclaimed the Immigration and Colonization Law. This law fostered the immigration of European colonists in order to populate the vast unspoiled Argentinian territories.

On 22 December 1881 the national government in Buenos Aires detached the National Territory of Misiones from the province of Corrientes.

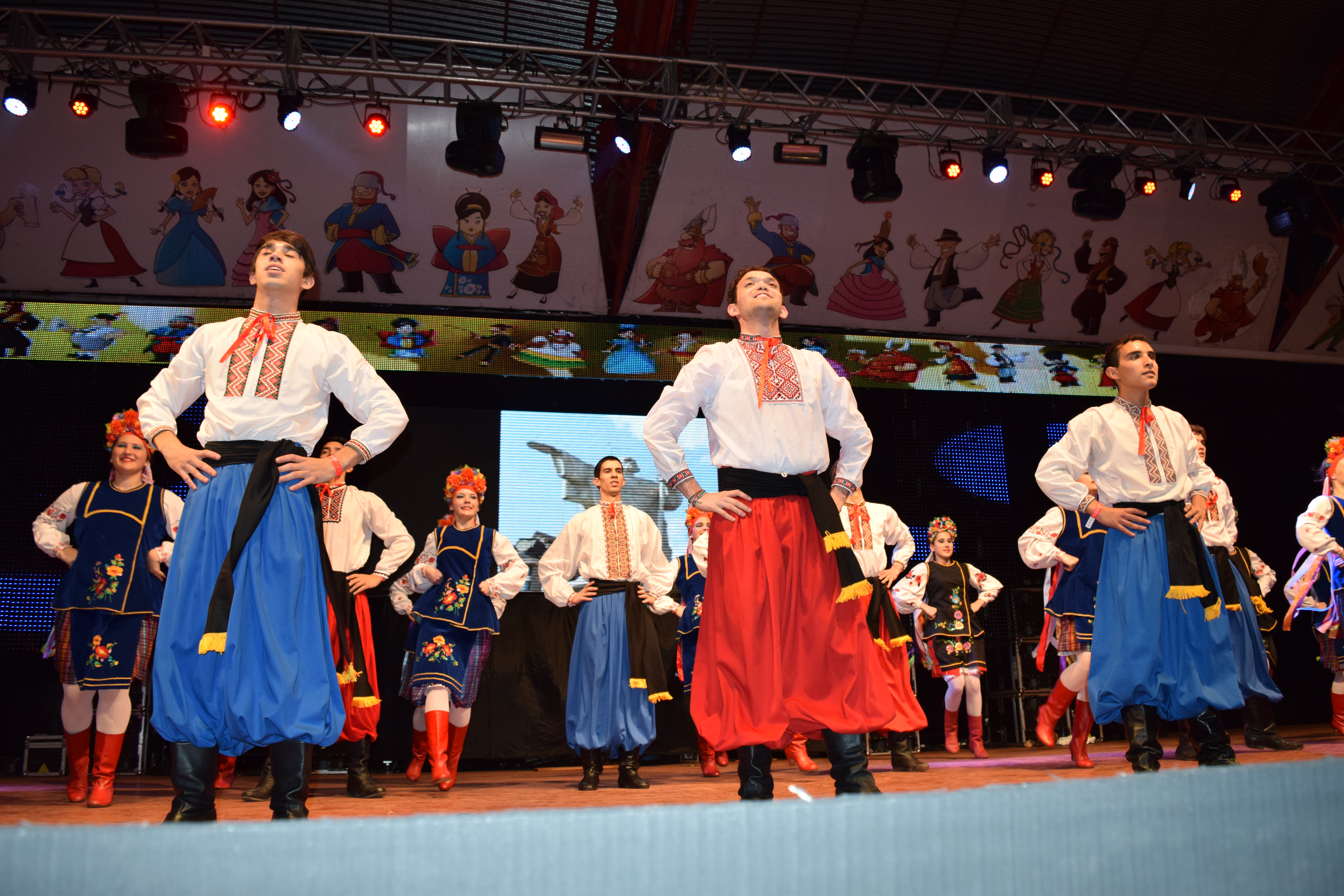
Descendants of Slavs in Misiones

Several colonizing companies formed under the Immigration and Colonization Law. One of them, Adolf Schwelm's Eldorado Colonización y Explotación de Bosques Ltda. S.A., founded the city of Eldorado in 1919 with a port on the Upper Paraná. Its agricultural colonies and experimental farms, the orange- and grapefruit-tree plantations, and the cultivation of yerba mate, the mills and the dryers for such product are characteristic of this area. Swedish-Argentines became well known for growing yerba mate.

Misiones received many immigrants, mostly from Europe, coming mainly via Southern Brazil. Some came from Buenos Aires, and from Eastern Europe, in particular large numbers of Poles and Ukrainians. Since then, Misiones has continued to benefit economically and has developed politically within Argentina. It has been successfully integrated into the Argentine state. As of 2016 control of the province is not contested. On December 10, 1953, the "National Territory of Misiones" gained provincial status in accordance with Law 14.294, and its constitution was approved on April 21, 1958.

Misiones received more attention from national policy-makers following a 1973 international agreement to construct the Yacyretá hydroelectric dam on a point in the Paraná River shared by Paraguay and Corrientes Province. When the dam became fully operative in the 1990s, the Paraná's waters all along the Misiones shores rose. They flooded lands that the dam's authorities had failed to clear and condition adequately, resulting in the onset of mosquito-transmitted illnesses, such as leishmaniasis, yellow fever, dengue, and malaria. The entire Misiones shores along the Paraná River is now confined by two dams, one of them Yaciretá, downstream of the river, and the other Itaipú, located in Brazil and Paraguay, upstream of the river and north of Puerto Iguazú. As of 2016 Argentina was pursuing an agreement with Paraguay to expand the reservoir works in order to double the facility's electricity production.

== Geography ==
Misiones is the second-smallest province after Tucumán.

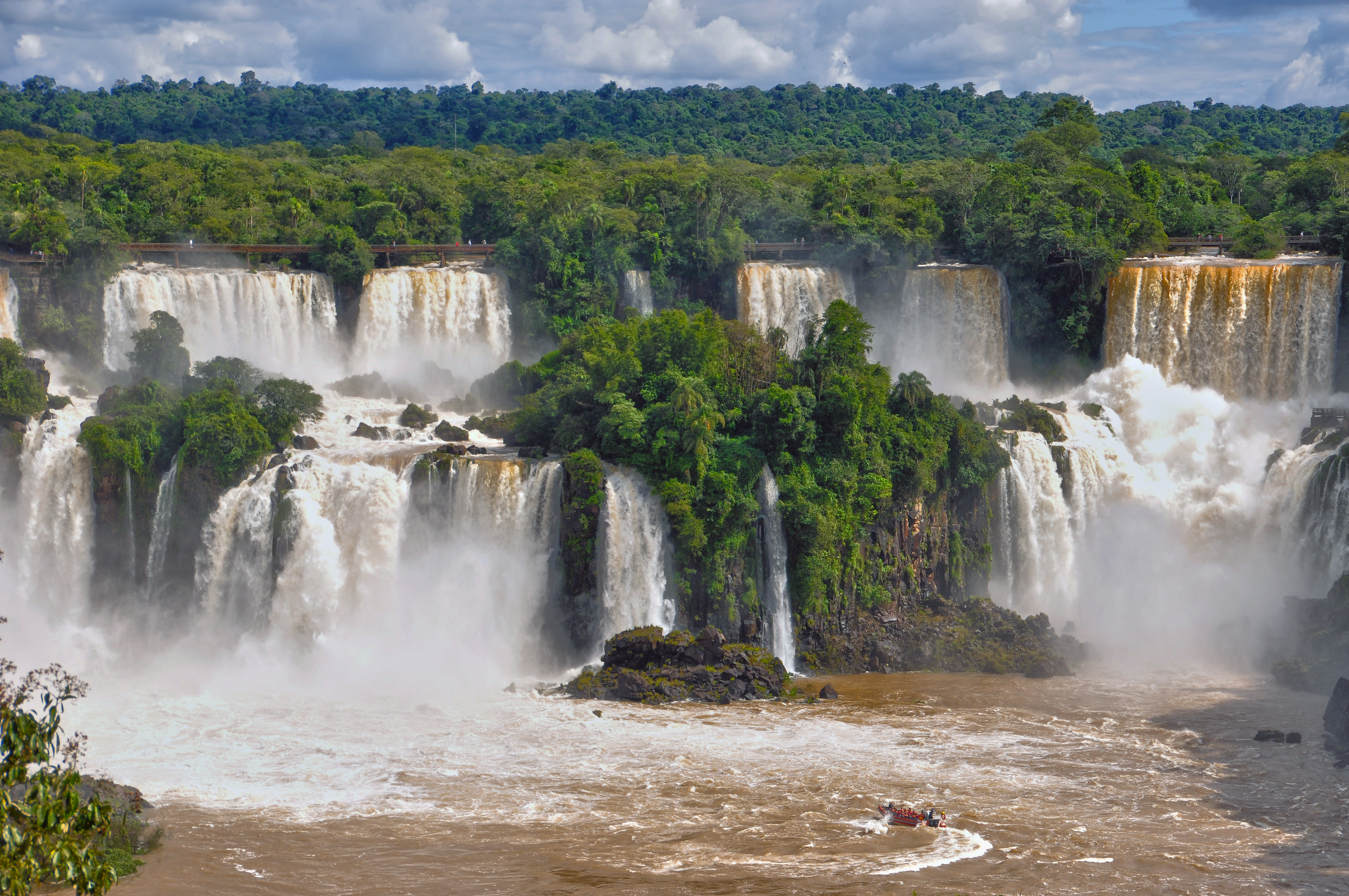
View of Iguazú Falls in the Iguazú National Park

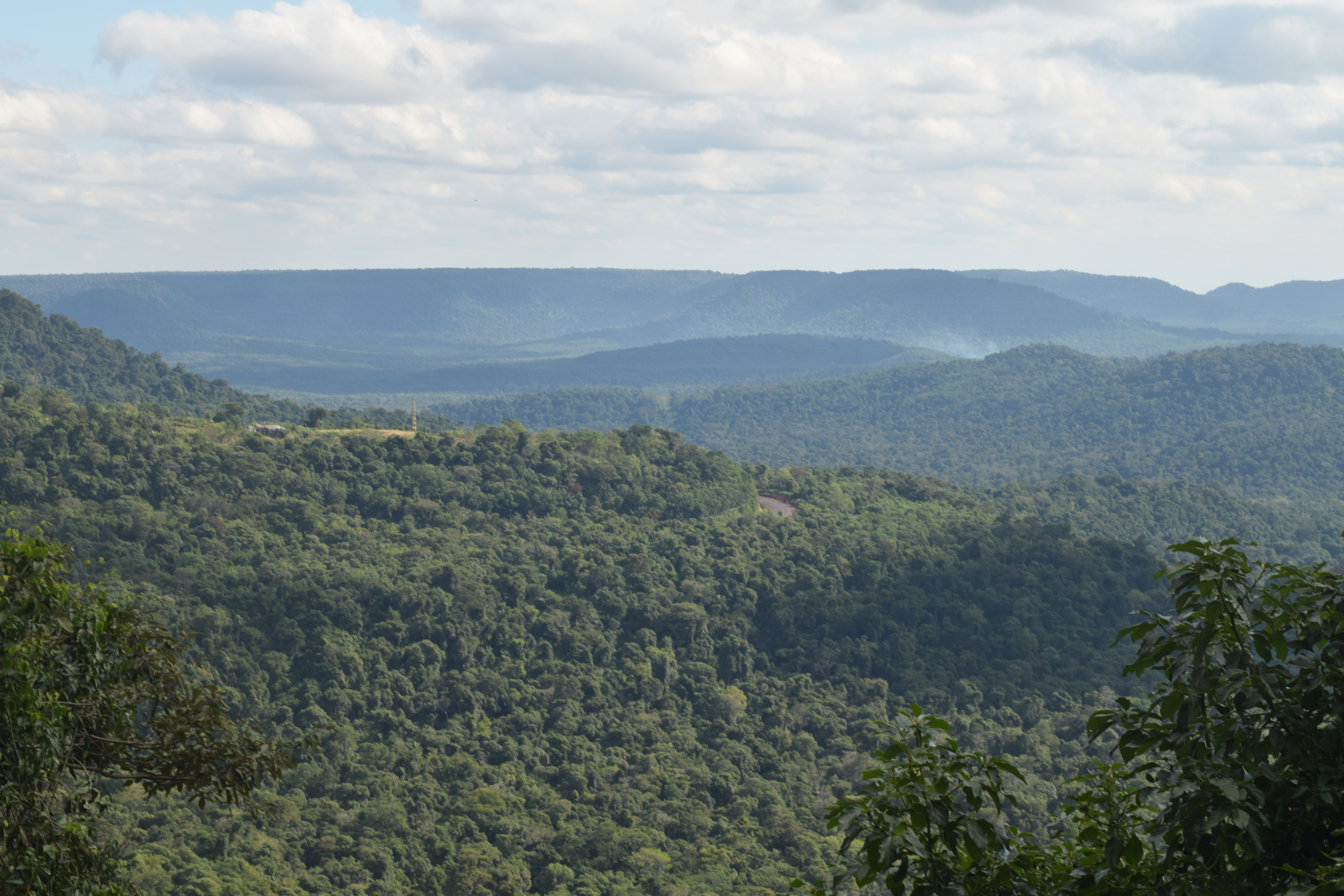
The Alto Paraná Atlantic forests

The Misiones plateau includes a part of Brazil across the border. The rocks contain significant quantities of iron which forms a part of the soil, giving it a reddish color. At the center of the plateau rises the Sierra de Misiones, its highest peak, 843 m, near Bernardo de Irigoyen, in the Cerro Rincón.

The province is embraced by three big rivers including the Paraná, Uruguay and Iguazú. Iguazu Falls are spectacular waterfalls on the Iguazú River in the northwest corner of the province, near the city of Puerto Iguazú. Misiones shares the falls with the Brazilian state of Paraná (in that nation's Southern Region). Meanwhile, the international border with Paraguay is close by.

=== Climate ===
Köppen climate map of Misiones Province

The province has a humid subtropical climate characterized by a lack of a dry season and abundant rainfall throughout the year. Under the Köppen climate classification, it is classified as Cfa. There are four distinct seasons although winters and autumns are fairly short. The mean annual temperature is around 21 °C (70 °F). June–August typically register the coldest days when temperatures can fall below 10 °C (50 °F). However, rare incursions of polar air into the province from the south can lead to frost. Summers are hot with temperatures exceeding 32 °C (90 °F) from December to February. One of the main characteristic is the presence of hills in the central and northern parts of the province leading to lower temperatures as a result of the higher elevation. Average annual rainfall ranges from a low of 1,870 millimetres (74 in) in the south to 2,360 millimetres (93 in) in the north. The rainfall pattern in the province has a bimodal distribution with two peaks occurring in Spring and Autumn with winters being the driest. The exceptions are the north and higher altitude areas where precipitation is well distributed throughout the year. Snowfall has occurred at the higher hills. For example, during the winter of 1975, snowfall was observed and accumulated in Bernardo de Irigoyen, one of the coldest towns in the province due to its high altitude 815 m (2,674 ft). Owing to the humid climate and high rainfall, relative humidity is high.

The vegetation is the so-called "Selva Misionera". Part of it has been transformed by mankind to implant cultures and ranching. The original biome is protected in Iguazú National Park, part of the Alto Paraná Atlantic forests, in turn part of the Atlantic Forest biome.

== Demographics ==
Misiones population pyramid (2022 census)

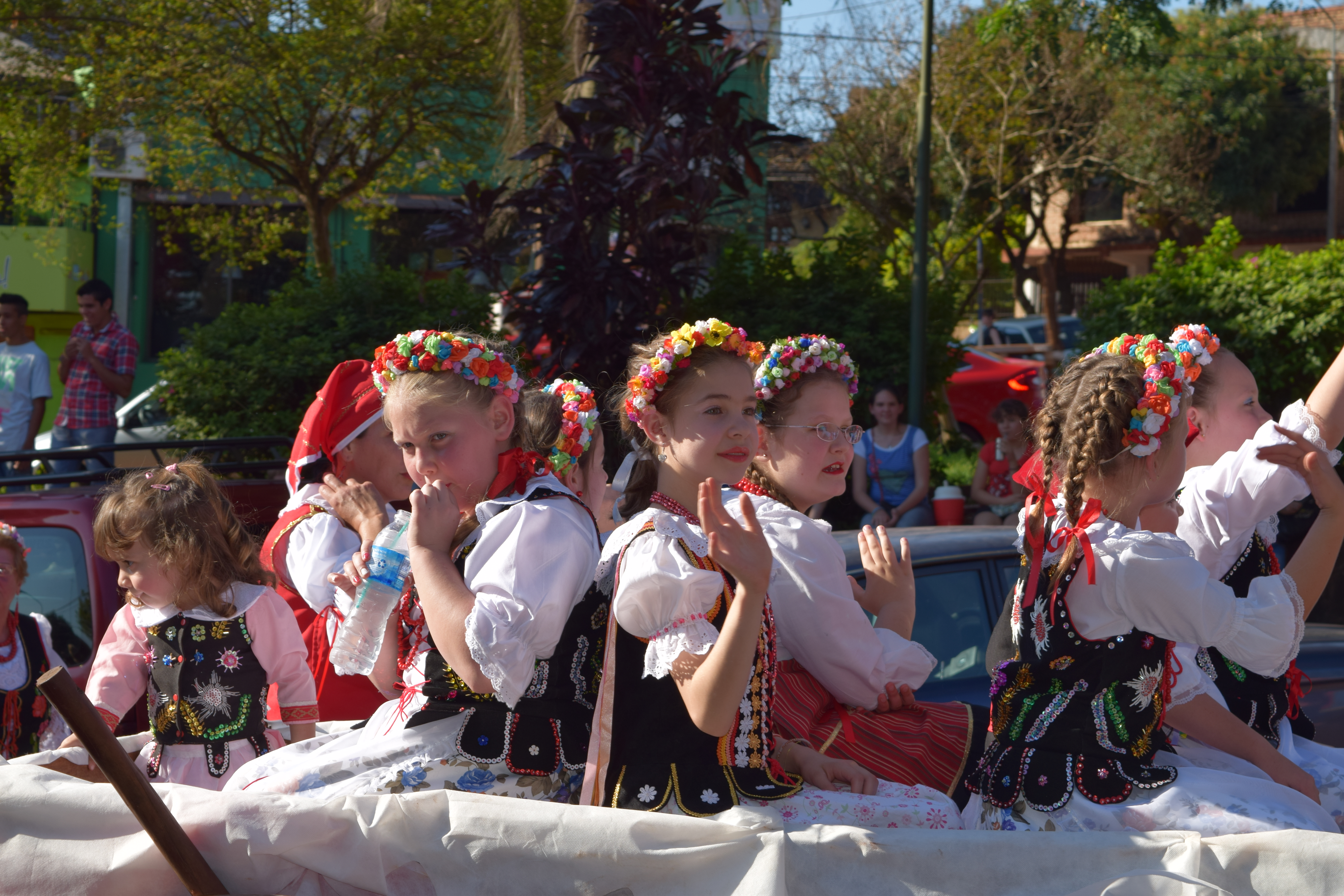
Children from the Misiones Province during the XXXIV Immigrant Festival

There are 1,280,960 people living in Misiones according to the national census of 2022. A part of the population is descendant of indigenous peoples (especially Guaranis) and also Spanish who reached during the colonization and mixed with natives. Another part of the residents are descendants of European immigrants. Unlike many regions of Argentina, where the immigrants came through Buenos Aires, most of the immigrants who settled in Misiones came through Southern Brazil. The ethnic groups who settled in Misiones after Spaniards are Italians, Germans, Poles, Ukrainians, Swiss, Russians, Swedes, Danes and a small number of Arabs, Japanese and, recently, Laotians (in the late 1970s) and Chinese (in the 2000s). From the 1960s, the province has also received immigrants from Brazil (mostly descendants of East Europeans) and Paraguay (mostly descendants both of indigenous peoples and Spaniards).

The literacy rate is 91.4%.

== Economy ==
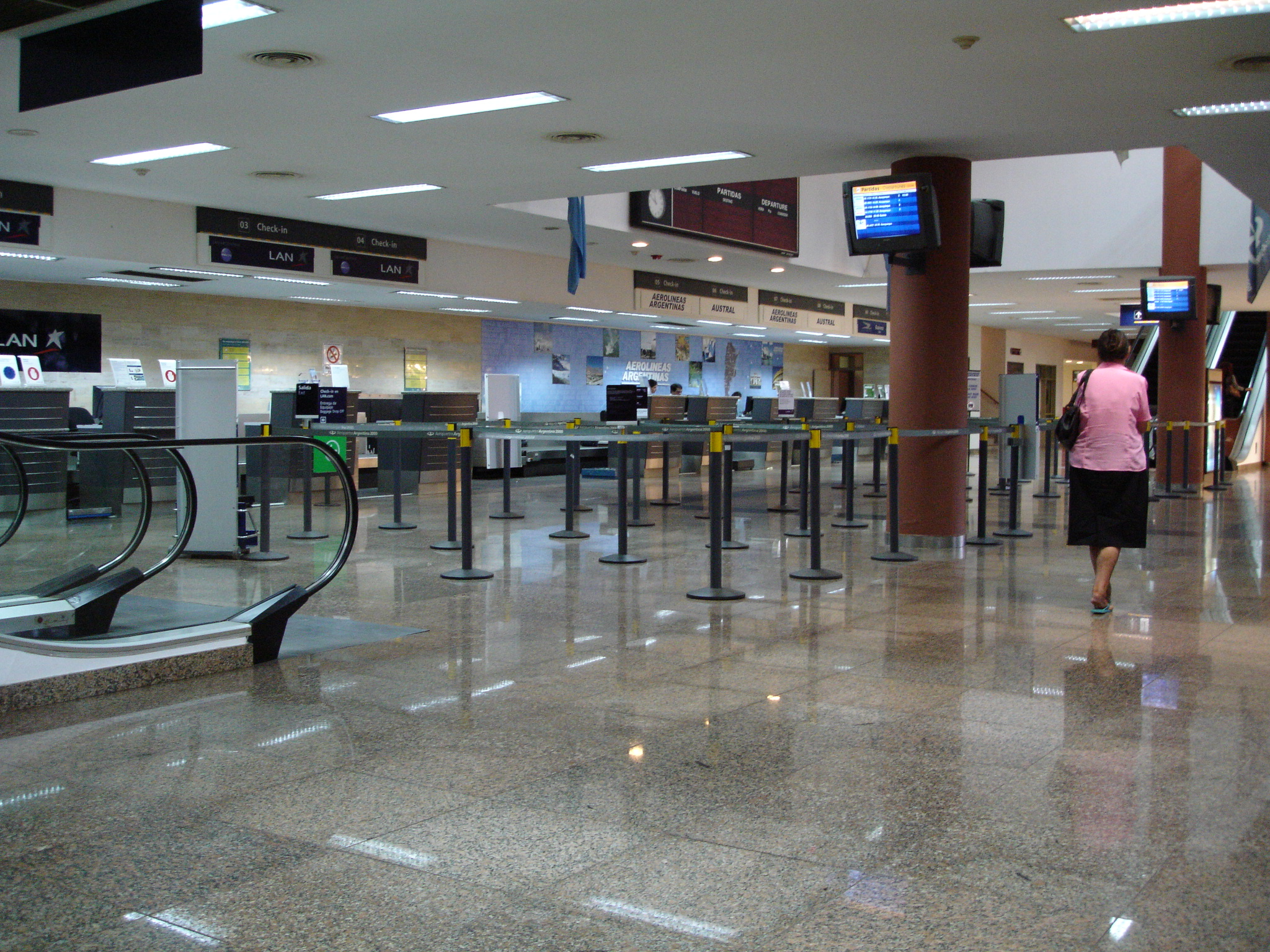
Terminal at Puerto Iguazu International Airport

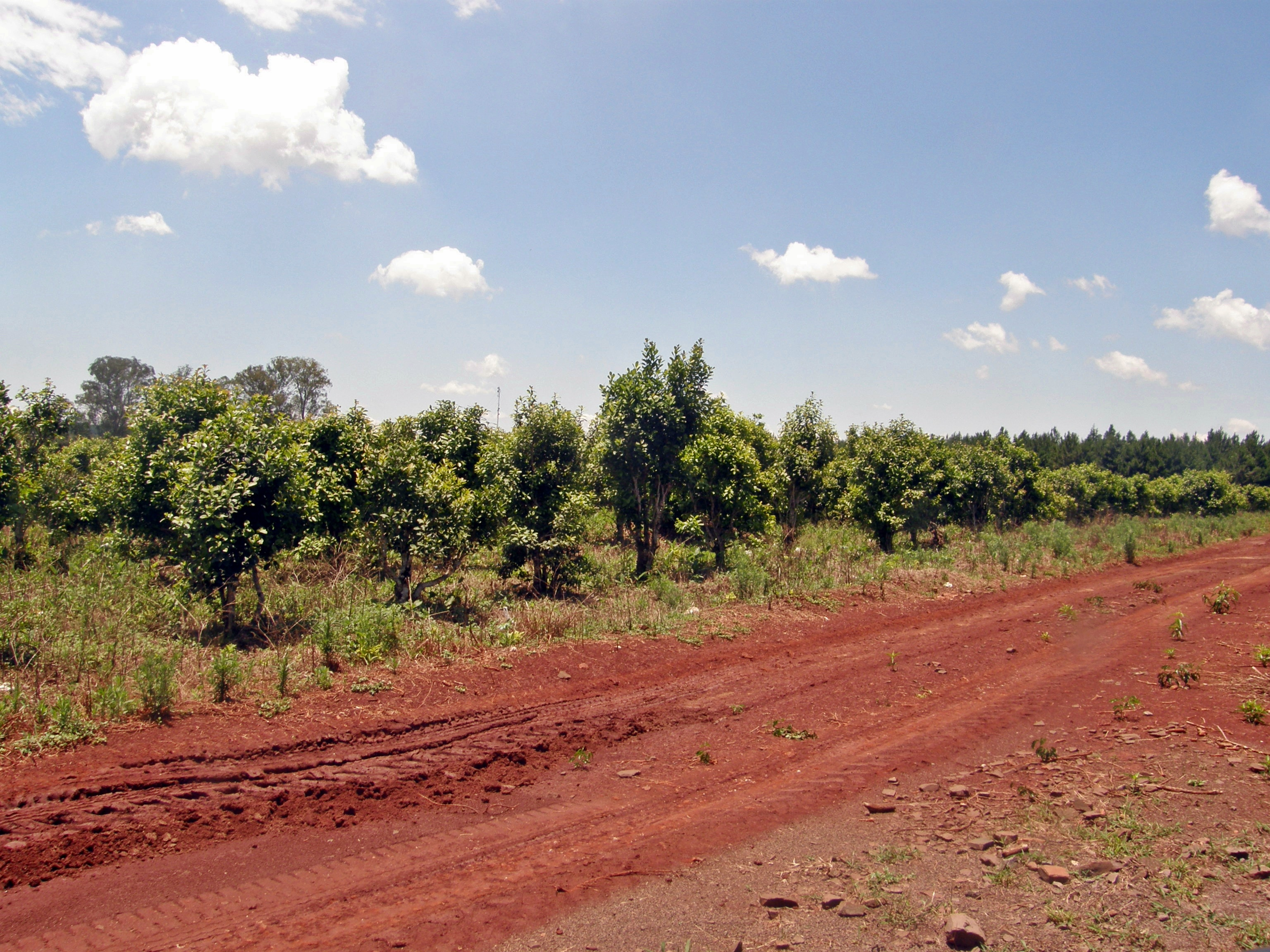
Yerba mate plantation

Misiones' economy, like most in northern Argentina, is relatively underdeveloped yet fairly well-diversified. Its 2006 output was estimated at US$4.8 billion (which shall be around US$7.2 billion in 2011, according to Argentina's economical growing) or US$4,940 per capita (around US$6,500 in 2011), over 40% below the national average.

Though its rainy, erosion-prone geography discourages intensive crop farming, agriculture makes an important contribution to the province's economy, adding about 10% to the total. Misiones' thick forests have long provided for the ample production of roundwood without excessive impact on its ecosystem. The principal exploited trees are the Paraná pine, Guatambú, Cedar, Petiribí, Incense, Cane water-pipe, Anchico, Eucalyptus and Gueycá.

Misiones' chief source of agricultural income, however, has long been the cultivation of yerba mate: Misiones is Argentina's leading producer (yielding about half a million tons, annually). Tea, citrus fruit and, in minor amounts, tobacco, sugar cane, rice, coffee, cocoa and coconut are also cultivated in Misiones.

Light manufacturing and tourism also contribute to the local economy, each adding about 13% to the total.

== Government ==
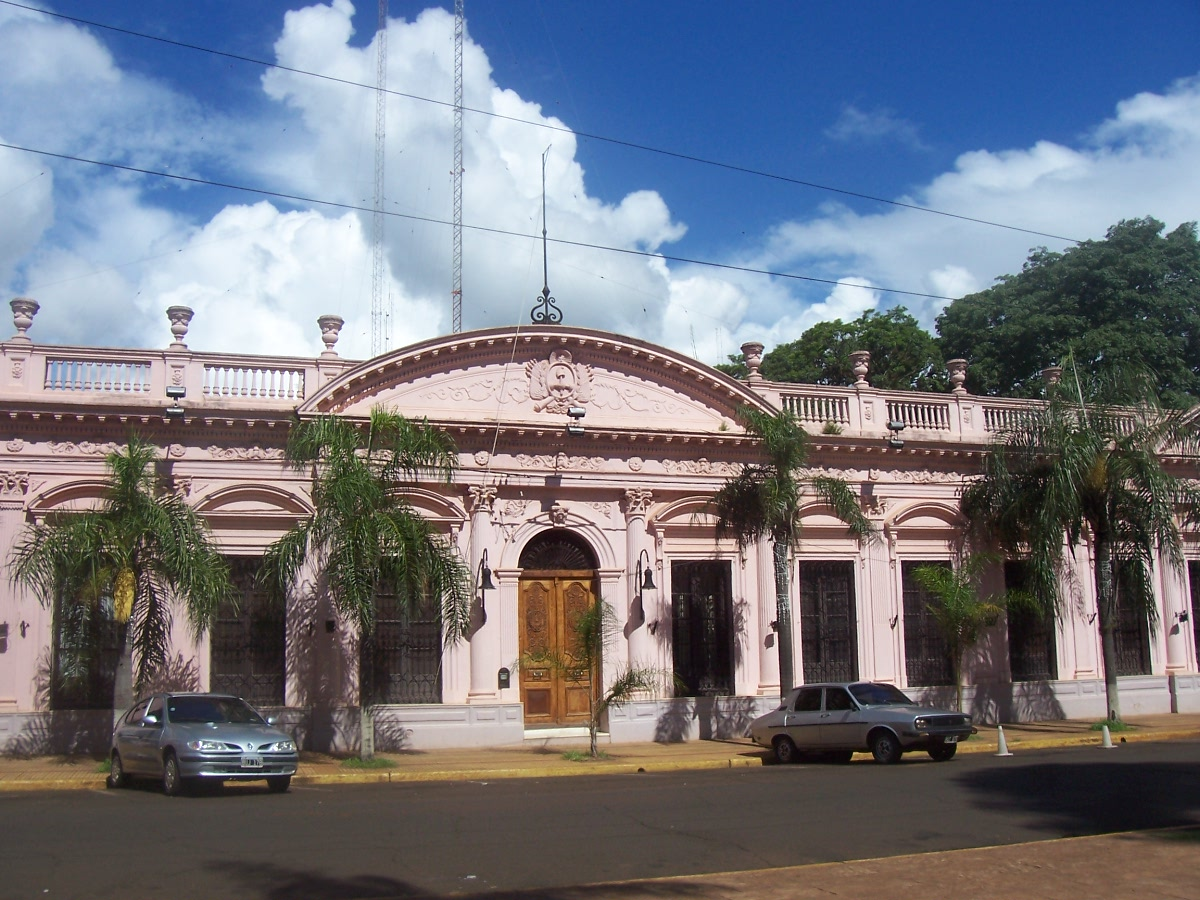
Governor's offices, Posadas

The provincial government is divided into the usual three branches: the executive, headed by a popularly elected governor, who appoint the cabinet; the legislative; and the judiciary, headed by the Supreme Court.

The Constitution of Misiones Province forms the formal law of the province.

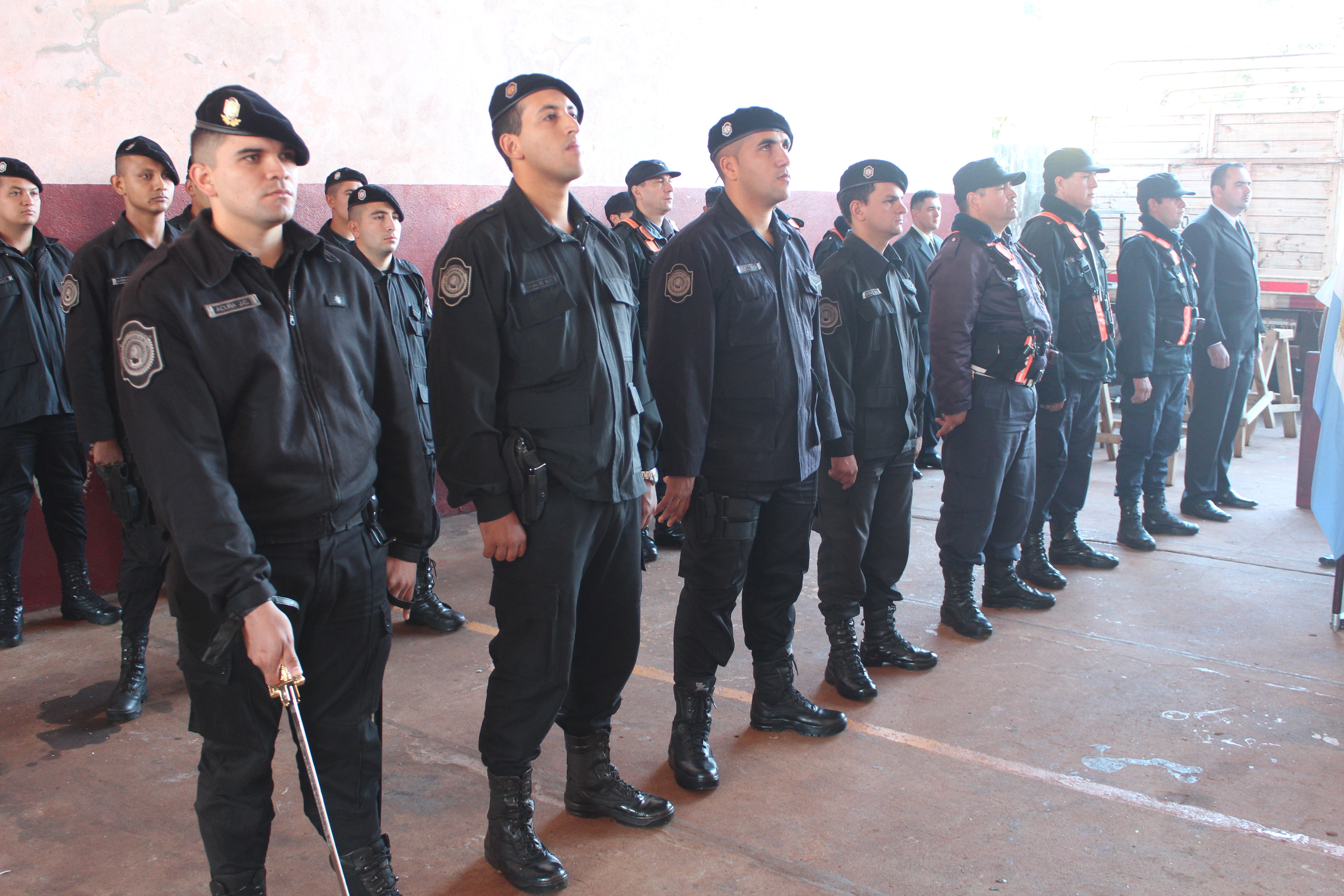
The provincial police of Misiones

In Argentina, the most important law enforcement organization is the Argentine Federal Police but the additional work is carried out by the Misiones Provincial Police.

== Political division ==
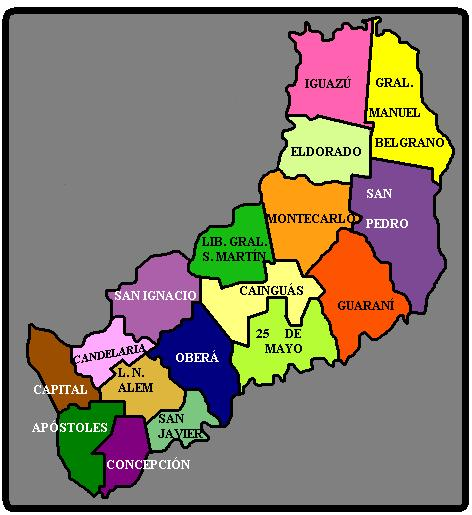
Misiones Province, Political Division

The province is divided in 17 departments (Spanish: departamentos):

Department	Capital
Apóstoles Department	Apóstoles
Cainguás Department	Campo Grande
Candelaria Department	Santa Ana
Capital Department	Posadas
Concepción de la Sierra Department	Concepción de la Sierra
Eldorado Department	Eldorado
General Manuel Belgrano Department	Bernardo de Irigoyen
Guaraní Department	El Soberbio
Iguazú Department	Puerto Esperanza
Leandro N. Alem Department	Leandro N. Alem, Misiones
Libertador General San Martín Department	Puerto Rico
Montecarlo Department	Montecarlo
Oberá Department	Oberá
San Ignacio	San Ignacio
San Javier Department	San Javier
San Pedro Department	San Pedro
Veinticinco de Mayo Department	Alba Posse

== Notable people ==
- Clotilde González de Fernández (1880–1935), pioneer of education in Misiones Province

== Twinning and cooperation ==
Misiones is twinned with:

- Pyrénées-Atlantiques, France (since 2012)

== Villages ==
- Almafuerte
- Campo Ramón
- Cerro Azul
- Cerro Corá
- Colonia Alberdi
- Colonia Aurora
- Colonia Delicia
- Colonia Polana
- Fachinal
- Florentino Ameghino
- Garuhapé-Mi
- Gobernador López
- Gobernador Roca
- Itacaruaré
- Los Helechos
- Olegario Víctor Andrade
- Profundidad
- San Martín

== See also ==
- Hito Tres Fronteras
- Yaciretá dam
- Immigrant's Festival
- History of yerba mate
