= National Route 12 (Argentina) =

Highway in Argentina

National Route 12
- Ruta nacional 12
- National Route 12

Route information
- Length: 1,580 km (980 mi)

Major junctions
- South end: Zárate
- North end: Fraternity Bridge, Puerto Iguazú

Location
- Country: Argentina
- Counties: Zárate, Campana, Gualeguay, Diamante, Paraná, La Paz, Ituzaingó, San Ignacio, Iguazú

Highway system
- Highways in Argentina

National Route 12 (RN12) is a road in Argentina, connecting the northeast section to the rest of the country. It runs through the provinces of Misiones, Corrientes, Entre Ríos and Buenos Aires.

Starting south of the city of Zárate in Buenos Aires Province, and crossing the Paraná River, through the Zárate-Brazo Largo Bridge, continues to the provincial capitals of Paraná, Corrientes and Posadas, ending at the Fraternity Bridge, in the city of Puerto Iguazú, bordering with Brazil. The road continues within Brazil as BR-469. Its length of 1,580 km (982 mi), is fully paved.

In the Zárate - Ceibas section, the road is a wide, 4-lane highway. Before the opening of the Zárate - Brazo Largo bridge, on 14 December 1977. cars had to cross the Paraná de las Palmas and Paraná Guazú rivers by barge. The section between the rivers, in Talavera Island, was a treated, unpaved road.

Construction on the second lane (widening) on the 45 km (28 mi) section between Brazo Largo and Ceibas (km markers 115 to 160) was started in May 1997, opening to the public on 12 October 1999.

National Law 25,680 published in the Official Bulletin on 3 January 2003 designates the section from Brazo Largo to Ceibas as David Della Chiesa road.

== Cities ==
The cities with more than 5,000 inhabitants crossed by the road (from South to North) are:

=== Buenos Aires Province ===
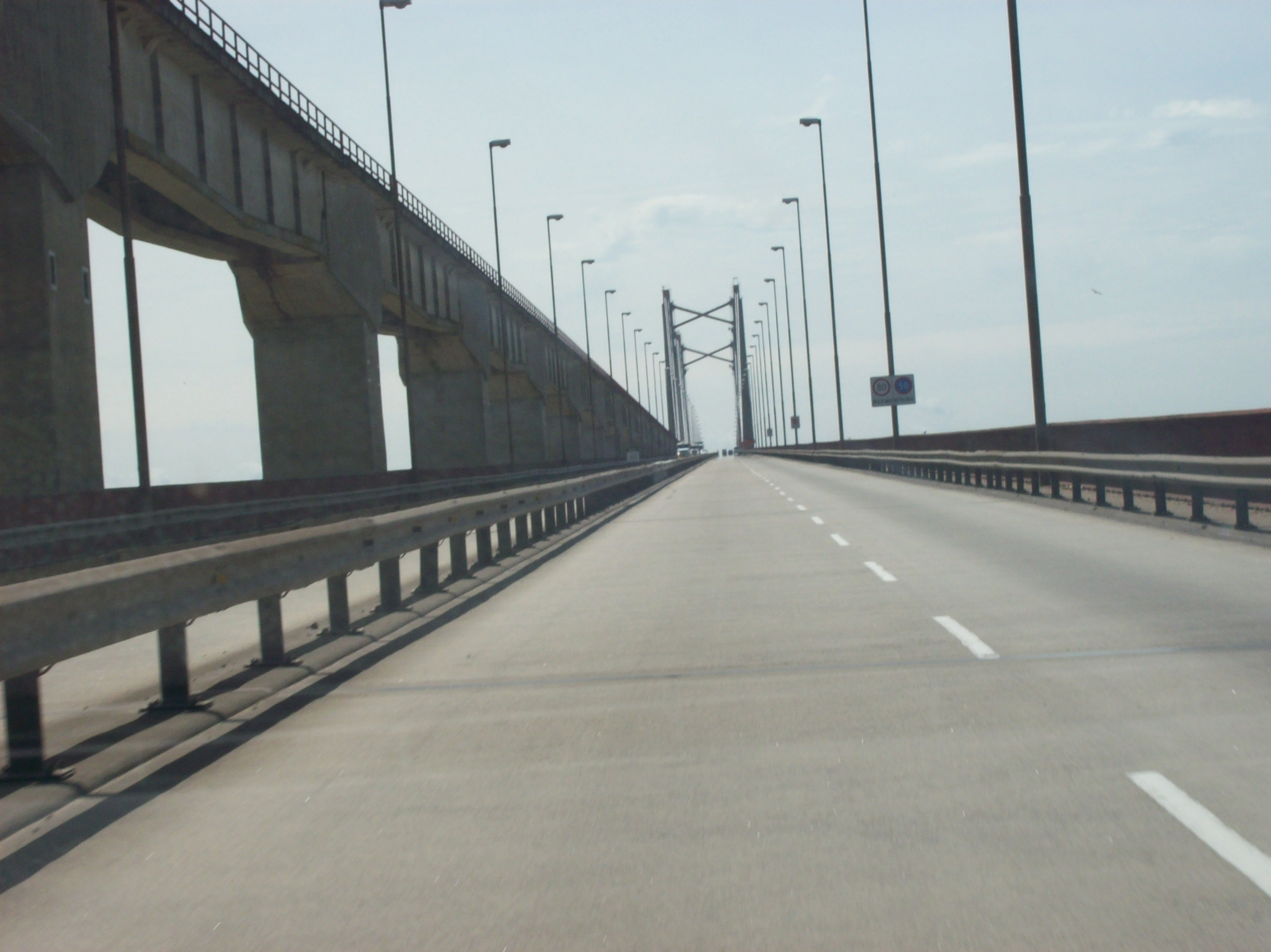
Unión Nacional railway complex over the Paraná river

Length: 30 km (km marker 82 to 112).

- Zárate Partido: Zárate (km 84).
- Zárate Partido - Islas Sector: no towns.
- Campana Partido: no towns.

=== Entre Ríos Province ===
Length: 535 km (km 112 a 647).

- Islas del Ibicuy Department: no towns with more than 5,000 inhabitants.
- Gualeguay Department: Gualeguay (km 231)
- Nogoyá Department: Nogoyá (km 337).
- Diamante Department: General Ramírez (km 376)
- Paraná Department: Crespo (km 401), San Benito and Paraná (km 445).
- La Paz Department: La Paz (km 601).

=== Corrientes Province ===
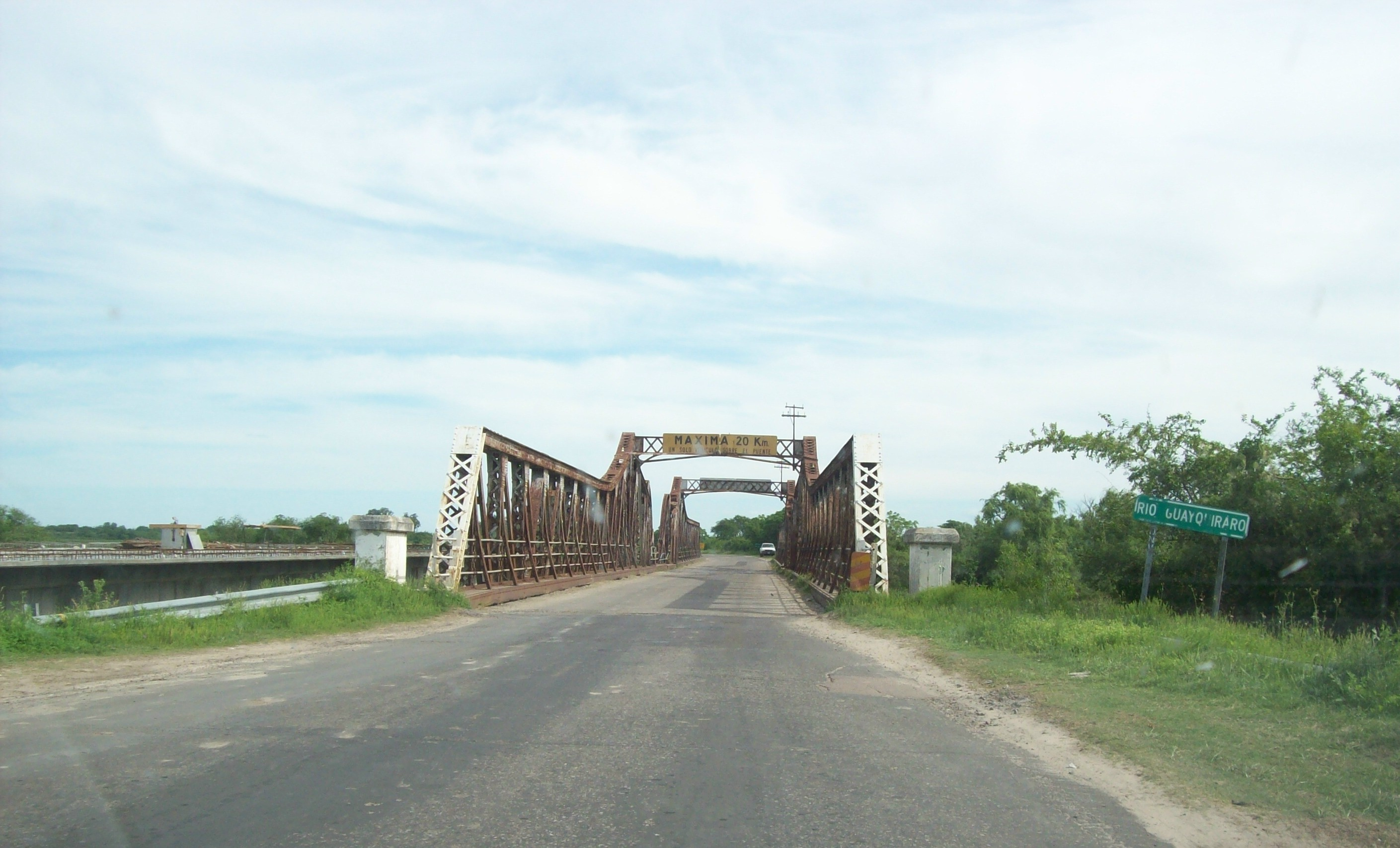
Metal bridge over the Guayquiraró River on the border between the provinces of Corrientes and Entre Ríos, opened in 1938. On the left, the new bridge under construction.

Length: 678 km (km markers 647 to 1325). RN12 is called John F. Kennedy Highway, between the capital cities of Corrientes and Misiones Provinces, Decree 8012 and Law 16484 of 24 September 1964, and Soberanía Nacional on the section Saladas - Goya, Decree 427 of 10 March 1981.

- Esquina Department: Esquina (km 684)
- Goya Department: Goya (km 795)
- Lavalle Department: no towns with more than 5,000 inhabitants.
- San Roque Department: no towns with more than 5,000 inhabitants, but the road passes through the Department seat, San Roque (km 902)
- Bella Vista Department: no towns with more than 5,000 inhabitants.
- Saladas Department: no towns with more than 5,000 inhabitants.
- Empedrado Department: Empedrado (km 977)
- Capital Department: Corrientes (km 1030)
- San Cosme Department: no towns with more than 5,000 inhabitants, but the road passes through the Department seat, San Cosme (km 1061)
- Itatí Department: Itatí (km 1089)
- Berón de Astrada Department: no towns with more than 5,000 inhabitants.
- General Paz Department: no towns with more than 5,000 inhabitants.
- San Miguel Department: no towns with more than 5,000 inhabitants.
- Ituzaingó Department: Ituzaingó (km 1256)

=== Misiones Province ===
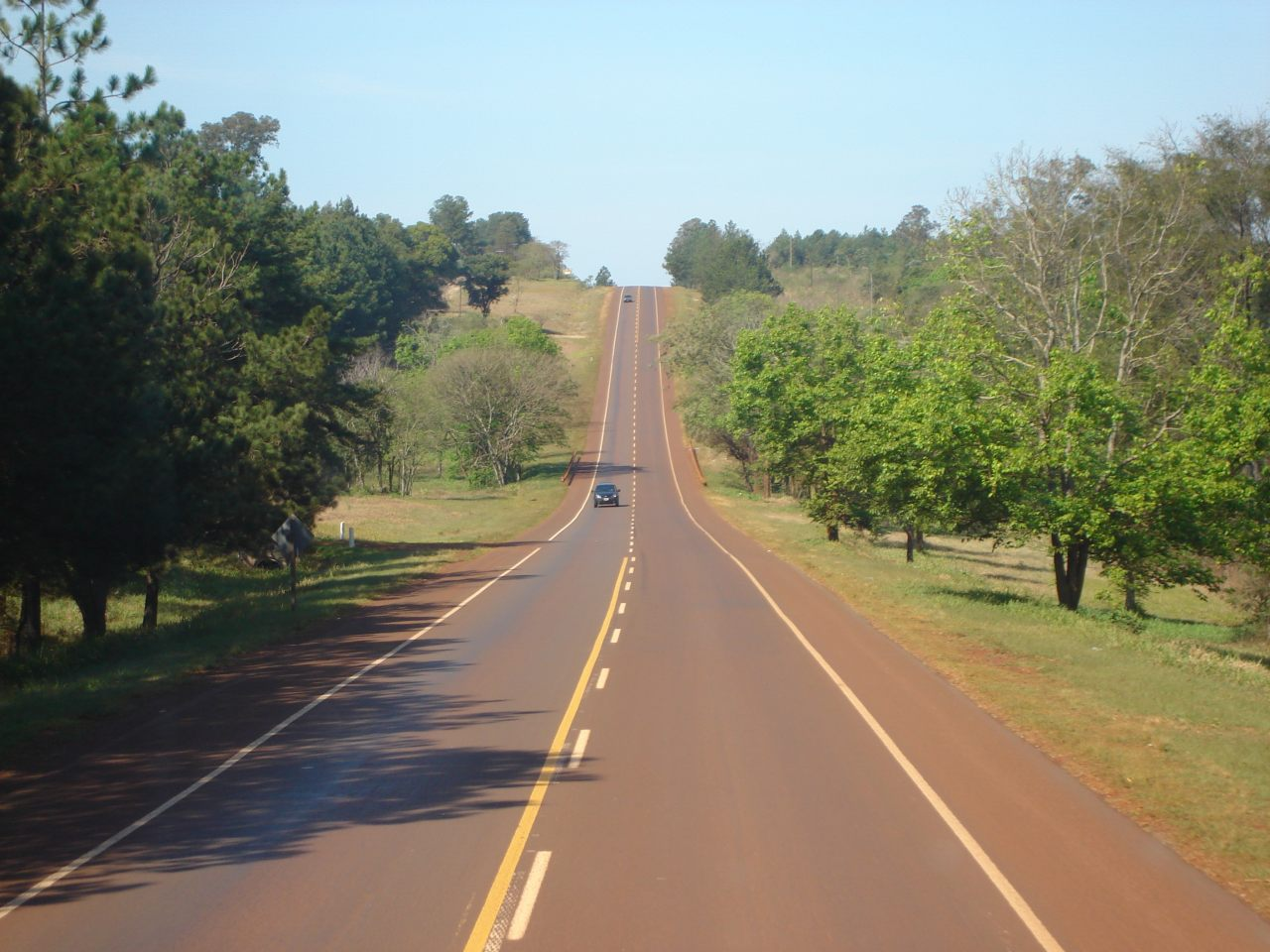
National Route 12 near Puerto Iguazú

Length: 317 km (km 1325 a 1642).

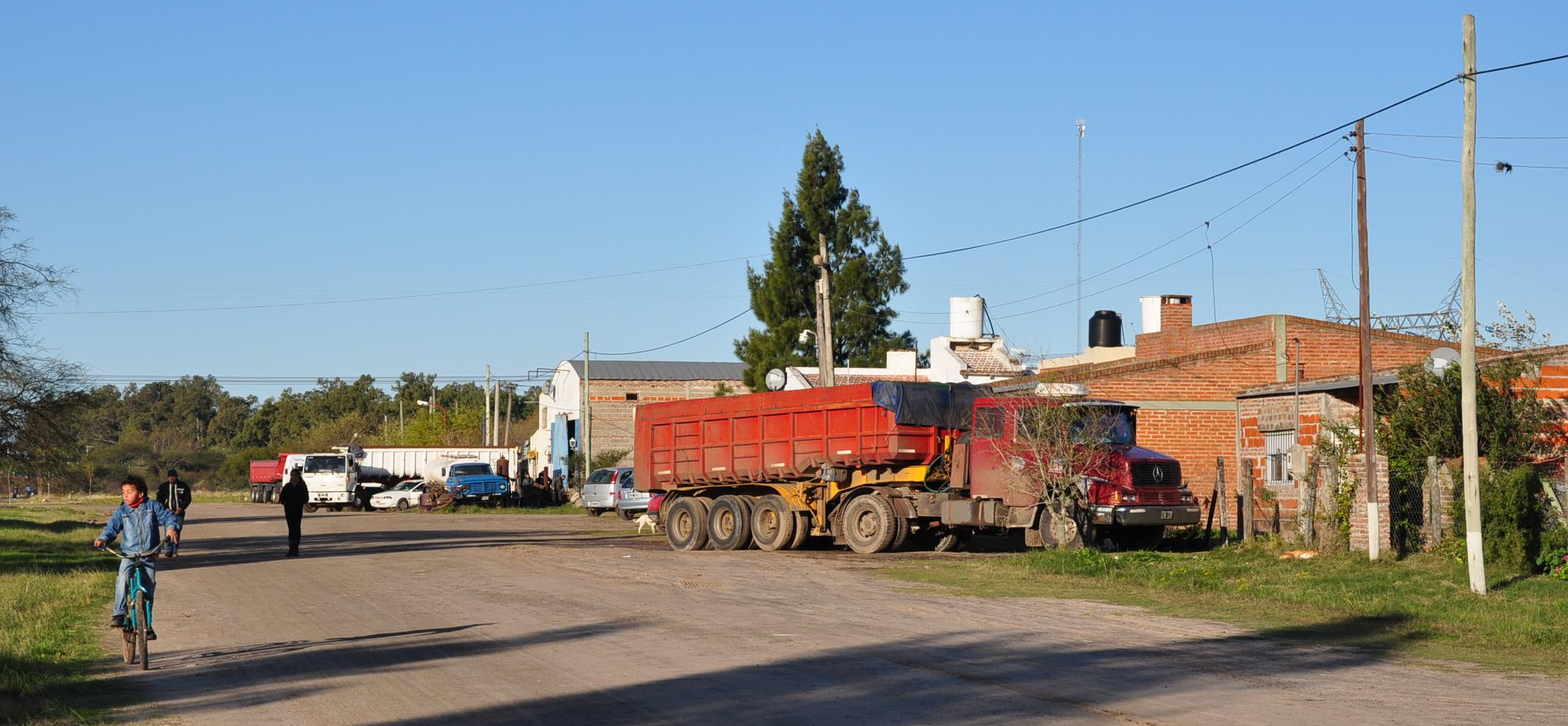
Ceibas, a village in Entre Rios where National Route 14 to Brazil branches off.

- Capital Department, Misiones: Posadas (km 1344), Miguel Lanús] (km 1347) and Garupá (km 1354).
- Candelaria: Candelaria (km 1361). The road also passes through the Department seat Santa Ana (km 1383).
- San Ignacio: San Ignacio (km 1398) and Jardín América (km 1437).
- Libertador General San Martín: Puerto Rico (km 1473).
- Montecarlo Department: Montecarlo (km 1521) and Puerto Piray (km 1531).
- Eldorado Department: Eldorado (km 1543).
- Iguazú: Puerto Esperanza (km 1591), Colonia Wanda] (km 1601), [Puerto Libertad (km 1608) and Puerto Iguazú (km 1640).

== Administration ==
In 1990 concessions were leased with toll collection on the busiest national roads, dividing the country in zones called "Corredores Viales".

The section between the junction with National Route 9 in Zárate and the junction with National Route 14 in Ceibas is part of Corridor Vial 18, under the management of Caminos del Río Uruguay (CRUSA) with a toll booth in Zárate (km marker 85).

In 1996 the concession was extended to 28 years with the condicion that the bidding company built a highway between the Complejo Unión Nacional and Gualeguaychú. The section between the General Justo José de Urquiza bridge and Ceibas was completed on October 12, 1999. Due to the currency devaluation of 2002, road work in the Ceibas - Gualeguaychú section was delayed.

The Virgen de Itatí Concesionaria de Obras Viales (VICOV) company took control of Corridor Vial 13, including, among others, Route 12 between km markers 871 and 1641, in the provinces of Corrientes and Misiones, from the junction with National Route 123 to the access to the Tancredo Neves International Bridge, excluding the section near the provincial capital city of Posadas (km 1336–1349) installing toll booths in Riachuelo (km 1014), Ituzaingó (km 1262), Santa Ana (km 1374) and Colonia Victoria (km 1551).

In 2003 the Corredores Viales concession contracts expired, and the numbering system was changed when calling for a new bidding process.

Corridor Vial 6 is now controlled by Empresa Concesionaria Vial (Emcovial) and includes Route 12 in the same section as the previous concession.

== Old roadbed ==
Originally National Route 12 had a different layout through the provinces of Buenos Aires, Entre Ríos and Corrientes.

The original road started in Buenos Aires, passing through General Pacheco, Campana and Zárate. The section between Zárate's port and Puerto Constanza, in Entre Ríos Province, crossed the Paraná river by barge in a 3-hour crossing.

After the change of route of National Route 9, in the late 1950s, the section from Avenida General Paz and Campana was changed to RN12. In 2005 the 8 km section between National Route 9 in Campana and the Bartolomé Mitre bridge access over the Paraná de las Palmas river changed to Buenos Aires provincial jurisdiction as a new section of Provincial Route 6. RN12 runs over the ol roadbed of National Route 193 to the bridge over National Route 9 in Zárate.

After Ceibas it followed the present National Route 14, traversing near Gualeguaychú, and the present Provincial Route 20, passing through Urdinarrain, Basavilbaso, Villaguay, Federal (Entre Ríos province) and San José de Feliciano.

In Corrientes Province, the road continued through Provincial Route 23 passing by Sauce and Perugorría, then by the present Provincial Route 24 until the junction with the present National Route 12.

This 580 km (360 mi) old roadbed changed to federal control by National Decree 1595 of 1979 except the National Route 14 section between Ceibas and the junction with Provincial Route 20.

ON the new roadbed the section between General Galarza and Nogoyá, on the south of Entre Ríos Province was still unopened. In 2005, the Dirección Nacional de Vialidad signed an agreement with its provincial counterpart to receive transfer of sections of provincial routes 6 and 39 to complete the missing sections of RN12.

== See also ==
- Zárate-Brazo Largo Bridge
- Fraternity Bridge
