= Itatí =

The name Itatí comes from Guaraní, but there is disagreement as to its exact meaning; ita- undoubtedly corresponds to the Guaraní word for "stone" (appearing in a number of other toponyms, such as Itaipu), while the last part could refer to (moro)ti ("white") or ty [tɨ] ("point").

- Itatí, Corrientes
- Itatí Department
- Our Lady of Itatí
- Itatí, villa miseria near La Plata
- Itatí Cantoral
- female name
