= Esquina =

Esquina is a word meaning "corner" in both Spanish and Portuguese languages.

- Clube da Esquina
- Esquina, Corrientes
- Esquina Department
- Esquinas, an orchestral composition by Silvestre Revueltas
