= Santiago Arzamendia =

Argentine-born Paraguayan footballer (born 1998)

Personal information
- Full name: Santiago Arzamendia Duarte
- Date of birth: 5 May 1998 (age 28)
- Place of birth: Wanda, Argentina
- Height: 1.72 m (5 ft 8 in)
- Position: Left-back

Team information
- Current team: Estudiantes
- Number: 15

Youth career
- 2011–2015: Cerro Porteño

Senior career*
Years	Team	Apps	(Gls)
2015–2021	Cerro Porteño	99	(6)
2021–2024	Cádiz	26	(1)
2023–2024	→ Cerro Porteño (loan)	39	(3)
2024–	Estudiantes	46	(2)

International career^{‡}
2020	Paraguay U23	3	(0)
2019–	Paraguay	31	(0)
- * Club domestic league appearances and goals as of 17:26, 21 November 2026 (UTC) ‡ National team caps and goals as of 10 October 2024

Santiago Arzamendia Duarte (born 5 May 1998) is professional footballer who plays as a left-back for Argentine club Estudiantes. Born in Argentina, he plays for the Paraguay national team.

== Club career ==
Born to Paraguayan parents in Wanda, in the Argentine province of Misiones, Arzamendia moved to Paraguay at age 13 and joined Cerro Porteño after passing the try outs. He made his debut as a senior for them during the 2015 campaign.

On 8 July 2021, Arzamendia signed a four-year contract with La Liga side Cádiz CF. On 7 July 2023, he renewed his contract until 2026, being loaned back to his former club Cerro for a year.

== International career ==
Eligible to play for Argentina or Paraguay, Arzamendia chose the latter in late September 2018. He made his debut for the Paraguay on 26 March 2019 in a friendly against Mexico, as a starter.

== Career statistics ==
=== Club ===
As of match played 14 December 2025

Appearances and goals by club, season and competition
Club	Season	League			Cup		Continental		Other		Total	
Club	Season	Division	Apps	Goals	Apps	Goals	Apps	Goals	Apps	Goals	Apps	Goals
Cerro Porteño	2017	Primera División	13	0	0	0	1 (Note: Appearance in the Copa Sudamericana)	0	0	0	14	0
Cerro Porteño	2018	Primera División	32	4	2	0	8 (Note: Appearance(s) in the Copa Libertadores)	1	0	0	42	5
Cerro Porteño	2019	Primera División	26	0	0	0	9	1	0	0	35	1
Cerro Porteño	2020	Primera División	18	0	0	0	4	0	1 (Note: Appearance in the Paraguayan Primera División Play-offs)	0	23	0
Cerro Porteño	2021	Primera División	10	2	0	0	6	0	0	0	16	2
Cerro Porteño	Total		99	6	2	0	28	0	1	0	125	8
Cádiz	2021–22	La Liga	14	1	3	0	–		–		17	1
Cádiz	2022–23	La Liga	12	0	1	0	–		–		13	0
Cádiz	Total		26	1	4	0	0	0	–		29	1
Cerro Porteño	2023	Primera División	19	3	2	0	–		–		21	3
Cerro Porteño	2024	Primera División	20	0	0	0	6	0	0	0	26	0
Cerro Porteño	Total		39	3	2	0	6	0	0	0	47	3
Estudiantes	2024	Primera División	13	0	0	0	0	0	0	0	13	0
Estudiantes	2025	Primera División	31	2	1	0	10	0	0	0	42	2
Estudiantes	Total		44	2	1	0	10	0	0	0	55	2
Career total			206	12	9	0	44	0	1	0	256	14

=== International ===
As of match played 10 October 2024

Appearances and goals by national team and year
National team	Year	Apps	Goals
Paraguay	2019	8	0
Paraguay	2021	11	0
Paraguay	2022	11	0
Paraguay	2024	1	0
Total		31	0

== Honours ==
Estudiantes

- Trofeo de Campeones de la Liga Profesional: 2024
- Primera División: 2025 Clausura
