= Amputee Football Cup of America =

Athletic competition

Amputee Football Cup of America Copa América de Futebol para Amputados
- Status: Active
- Genre: Sports event
- Years active: 16
- Inaugurated: 2009
- Previous event: 2015

The Amputee Football Cup of America, also called Copa América de Futebol para Amputados, is an American tournament in association football for amputee people. It was first held in 2009 in Crespo, Argentina.

== Competitions by year ==
Number	Year	Host city	Teams	Gold	Silver	Bronze	4th place
1	2009	(Argentina) Crespo	4	Brazil	Argentina	El Salvador	Ghana
2	2013	(Brazil) Cataguases	4	Brazil	Mexico	Mexico	Argentina
3	2015	(Mexico) San Juan de los Lagos	7	Brazil	Argentina	Colombia	Mexico

== Medals summary ==
Rank	Nation	Gold	Silver	Bronze	Total
1	Brazil	3	0	0	3
2	Argentina	0	2	0	2
3	Mexico	0	1	1	2
4	Colombia	0	0	1	1
4	El Salvador	0	0	1	1
Totals (5 entries)		3	3	3	9

== Participating nations ==
Team	(Argentina) 2009	(Brazil) 2013	(Mexico) 2015	Years
Argentina	2nd	4th	2nd	3
Brazil	1st	1st	1st	3
Colombia	×	×	3rd	1
Costa Rica	×	×	GS	1
El Salvador	3rd	×	GS	2
Ghana	4th	×	×	1
Haiti	×	×	GS	1
Mexico	×	2nd	4th	2
Total	4	3	7	

Legend

- 1st – Champions
- 2nd – Runners-up
- 3rd – Third place
- 4th – Fourth place
- QF – Quarter-finals
- GS – Group stage
- FR – Final round
- Q – Qualified for upcoming tournament
- •• — Qualified but withdrew / Disqualified after qualification
- • — Did not qualify
- × — Did not enter / Withdrew / Disqualified
- — Hosts

== See also ==
- Amputee football
- Amputee Football World Cup
