= San Ignacio, Misiones =

San Ignacio, Misiones may refer to:

- San Ignacio, Argentina, a city in the province of Misiones
- San Ignacio, Paraguay, a city in the department of Misiones
