= List of Brazilian films of 2024 =

This is a list of Brazilian films released in 2024.

== Films ==
Title	Director	Cast	Notes	Ref
Baby	Marcelo Caetano	João Pedro Mariano, Ricardo Teodoro, Ana Flavia Cavalcanti, Bruna Linzmeyer, Luiz Bertazzo		
The Falling Sky	Eryk Rocha, Gabriela Carneiro da Cunha			
Motel Destino	Karim Aïnouz	Iago Xavier, Nataly Rocha, Fábio Assunção		
I'm Still Here	Walter Salles	Fernanda Torres, Selton Mello, Guilherme Silveira, Valentina Herszage, Luiza Kosovski, Dan Stulbach		
Kissing Bug (Vinchuca)	Luis Zorraquín	Fernando Vergara, Ana Sedoff, Marcelo Savignone, Rafael Sieg, Sabina Buss		
