= 2009 Amputee Football Cup of America =

Tournament details
- Host country: Argentina
- City: Crespo
- Dates: 23–26 Nov
- Teams: 4
- Venue: 1

Final positions
- Champions: Brazil (1st title)
- Runners-up: Argentina
- Third place: El Salvador
- Fourth place: Ghana

Tournament statistics
- Matches played: 10
- Goals scored: 24 (2.4 per match)
- Top scorer: (Brazil) Rogerio Almeida (4 goals)
- Best player: (Argentina) Hugo Hereñu

The 2009 Amputee Football Cup of America was the 1st edition of the international competition of amputee football national men's teams in America. It was organized by the World Amputee Football Federation (WAFF), and was held in Crespo, Argentina between 23 and 26 November 2009.

Brazil won the title for the first time, defeating Argentina in the final. El Salvador became bronze medalist.

== Participating nations ==
Following four nations competed in the tournament. All of them qualified for the knockout stage.

- Argentina
- Brazil
- El Salvador
- Ghana

== Preliminary round ==
Team	Pld	W	D	L	GF	GA	GD	P
Brazil	3	3	0	0	7	2	+5	9
Argentina	3	2	0	1	6	5	+1	6
Ghana	3	1	0	2	4	7	-3	3
El Salvador	3	0	0	3	2	5	-3	0

23 November 2009
	Ghana	(Ghana)	2 - 1	(El Salvador)	El Salvador	Unión de Crespo
	Brazil	(Brazil)	3 - 1	(Argentina)	Argentina	Unión de Crespo
24 November 2009
	Brazil	(Brazil)	1 - 0	(El Salvador)	El Salvador	Unión de Crespo
	Argentina	(Argentina)	3 - 1	(Ghana)	Ghana	Unión de Crespo
25 November 2009
09:00 GMT-3	Brazil	(Brazil)	3 - 1	(Ghana)	Ghana	Unión de Crespo
11:00 GMT-3	Argentina	(Ghana)	2 - 1	(El Salvador)	El Salvador	Unión de Crespo

== Knockout stage ==
Semi-finals
1	Brazil	1
4	El Salvador	0
2	Argentina	1
3	Ghana	0

Gold medal
1	Brazil	0 (4)
2	Argentina	0 (3)
Bronze medal
4	El Salvador	2
3	Ghana	1

Semi-finals

25 November 2009
20:00 GMT-3	Brazil	(Brazil)	1 – 0	(El Salvador)	El Salvador	Unión de Crespo
21:30 GMT-3	Argentina	(Argentina)	1 – 0	(Ghana)	Ghana	Unión de Crespo

3rd place

26 November 2009
19:00 GMT-3	El Salvador	(El Salvador)	2 – 1	(Ghana)	Ghana	Unión de Crespo

Final

26 November 2009
20:30 GMT-3	Brazil	(Brazil)	0 – 0 (pen. 4 – 3)	(Argentina)	Argentina	Unión de Crespo

== Rankings ==
Rank	Team
1	Brazil
2	Argentina
3	El Salvador
4	Ghana

2009 Amputee Football Cup of America

Brazil
First title
