= Kissing Bug (film) =

2024 Argentinian-Brazilian film

- Directed by: Luis Zorraquín
- Written by: Luis Zorraquín; Laura Ávila
- Produced by: José Salvia
- Starring: Fernando Vergara; Ana Sedoff; Marcelo Savignone
- Cinematography: Edu Rabin
- Music by: Pedro Santiago
- Production companies: Pelícano Films; Labuta Filmes
- Distributed by: Habanero Film Sales
- Release date: November 26, 2024 (Argentina)
- Running time: 95 minutes
- Countries: Argentina; Brazil
- Languages: Spanish; Portuguese

Kissing Bug (Spanish: Vinchuca) is a 2024 Argentinian-Brazilian drama film directed by Luis Zorraquín and starring Fernando Vergara, Ana Sedoff, and Marcelo Savignone.

== Synopsis ==
Nelson (Fernando Vergara) is a dropout teenager living near the Argentina–Brazil border who makes money by smuggling mobile phones between the two countries. When the police take notice of this, they arrest him and use him as a spy to try to get to Jara (Rafael Sieg), an alleged narcotrafficker. As Nelson gets involved with him and his family, he gets to know his young daughter Carol (Ana Sedoff), whom he eventually falls in love with.

== Cast ==
- Fernando Vergara as Nelson
- Ana Sedoff as Carol
- Marcelo Savignone as Gustavo
- Rafael Sieg as Jara
- Sabina Buss as Gimenez

== Production ==
Kissing Bug is a co-production between Pelícano Films (from Argentina) and Labuta Filmes (from Brazil), with the participation of Productora de la Tierra. It was also supported by the Misiones Audiovisual Arts Institute (Instituto de Artes Audiovisuales de Misiones) and the National Institute of Cinema and Audiovisual Arts. Esteban Lucangioli (from Pelícano Films) and Bruno Autran (from Labuta Filmes) served as the producers, while José Salvia assisted production in Misiones.

Shooting took place in December 2021 in the Argentinian province of Misiones, close to the border. Filming locations include Wanda, Puerto Esperanza, Puerto Iguazú, and Puerto Libertad. Cinematography was directed by the Argentinian Edu Rabin. Spoken languages include Spanish and Portuguese. The soundtrack was made by the Brazilian Pedro Santiago with a synthesizer. In November 2022, while in production, the project was presented on a Works in Progress session at the Tallinn Black Nights Film Festival in Tallinn, Estonia. Production officially ended in March 2023.

This project was Fernando Vergara's acting debut. It also marked Luis Zorraquín's second film as the director, following Guaraní (2015). Besides, Brazilian actor Rafael Sieg noted that it was his third time starring in an Argentinian-Brazilian co-production.

== Distribution ==
The film premiered on 26 November 2024, in the 39th edition of the Mar del Plata International Film Festival. It was later shown at the Chicago Latino Film Festival in Chicago, USA and at the BUFF Film Festival in Malmö, Sweden.

It eventually made its way into movie theaters in April 2025, specifically in the Gaumont Cinema in Buenos Aires, Argentina. It's distributed by the sales company Habanero Film Sales, which is specialized in Latin American and Caribbean cinema, as part of its South American-themed lineup, called Ventana Sur. It is suitable for 13-year-olds and over.

== Reception ==
According to the regional journal La Voz de Misiones, Vergara's acting was well received by the audience at the Mar del Plata International Film Festival, specially in the parts where he interacted with Sedoff's and Savignone's characters.

On one hand, Francisco Mendes Moas from Cine y Teatro Argentino Hoy agreed that the acting was "great", added that its cinematography was "magnific" and highlighted the way in which the teenage characters were written. He gave it an overall score of 4.75 stars out of 5, describing it as "captivating". On the other hand, Juan Pablo Russo from EscribiendoCine rated the film 5/10, writing that it "loses narrative direction" as minutes go by and deeming the storytelling "inconsistent". Nonetheless, he praised it for centering around the intersection between adolescence, state control and neglect. Franco Denápole from Funcinema similarly rated it 6/10, complimenting it for being able to balance Nelson's storyline with Gustavo's one as well as portraying crime in this region between Argentina and Brazil. However, Denápole also pointed out that the storytelling was so straightforward that viewers may feel as though they had not gotten to know one of the main characters properly.

== Nominations and accolades ==
Award	Ceremony date	Category	Recipients	Result	Ref.
Mar del Plata International Film Festival	21 November–1 December 2025	Argentinian Competition	Kissing Bug	Nominated	
