= San Ignacio Department =

San Ignacio Department may refer to:

- San Ignacio Department, Paraguay, now known as Misiones Department
- San Ignacio Department, Misiones, Argentina
