= Hernandarias =

Hernandarias may refer to:

- Hernando Arias de Saavedra, the first South American governor born in the Americas
- Hernandarias District, Alto Paraná department, Paraguay
- Hernandarias Subfluvial Tunnel, joining Santa Fe and Paraná Argentina
