= 2015 Amputee Football Cup of America =

Tournament details
- Host country: Mexico
- City: San Juan de los Lagos
- Dates: 23–29 Nov
- Teams: 7
- Venue: 1

Final positions
- Champions: Brazil (3rd title)
- Runners-up: Argentina
- Third place: Colombia
- Fourth place: Mexico

Tournament statistics
- Matches played: 16
- Goals scored: 75 (4.69 per match)

The 2015 Amputee Football Cup of America was the 3rd edition of the international competition of amputee football national men's teams in America. It was organized by the World Amputee Football Federation (WAFF), and was held in San Juan de los Lagos, Mexico between 23 and 29 November 2015.

Brazil won the title for the third time, defeating Argentina in the final. Colombia became bronze medalist before Mexico.

== Participating nations ==
Following seven nations competed in two groups. The first two ranking teams in each group qualified for the knockout stage.

- Argentina
- Brazil
- Colombia
- Costa Rica
- El Salvador
- Haiti
- Mexico

== Preliminary round ==
=== Group 1 ===
Team	Pld	W	D	L	GF	GA	GD	P
Mexico	3	3	0	0	17	1	+16	9
Colombia	3	2	0	1	13	5	+8	6
Haiti	3	1	0	2	5	5	0	3
Costa Rica	3	0	0	3	0	24	-24	0

23 November 2015
	Haiti	(Haiti)	3 – 0	(Costa Rica)	Costa Rica
	Mexico	(Mexico)	3 – 1	(Colombia)	Colombia
24 November 2015
	Colombia	(Colombia)	3 – 2	(Haiti)	Haiti
	Mexico	(Mexico)	12 – 0	(Costa Rica)	Costa Rica
25 November 2015
	Colombia	(Colombia)	9 – 0	(Costa Rica)	Costa Rica
	Mexico	(Mexico)	2 – 0	(Haiti)	Haiti

=== Group 2 ===
Team	Pld	W	D	L	GF	GA	GD	P
Argentina	2	1	1	0	2	1	+1	4
Brazil	2	0	2	0	2	2	0	2
El Salvador	2	0	1	1	3	4	-1	1

23 November 2015
	Brazil	(Brazil)	2 – 2	(El Salvador)	El Salvador
24 November 2015
	Argentina	(Argentina)	2 – 1	(El Salvador)	El Salvador
25 November 2015
	Argentina	(Argentina)	0 – 0	(Brazil)	Brazil

== Copa Proan ==
Team	Pld	W	D	L	GF	GA	GD	P
El Salvador	2	2	0	0	17	1	+16	6
Haiti	2	1	0	1	6	4	+2	3
Costa Rica	2	0	0	2	0	18	-18	0

26 November 2015
	El Salvador	(El Salvador)	13 – 0	(Costa Rica)	Costa Rica
27 November 2015
	Costa Rica	(Costa Rica)	0 – 5	(Haiti)	Haiti
28 November 2015
	El Salvador	(El Salvador)	4 – 1	(Haiti)	Haiti

== Knockout stage ==
Semi-finals
1-1	Mexico	2
2-2	Brazil	3
2-1	Argentina	0(4)
1-2	Colombia	0(2)

Final
2-2	Brazil	2
2-1	Argentina	0
3rd place
1-1	Mexico	1
1-2	Colombia	2

Semi-finals

27 November 2015
	Mexico	(Mexico)	2 – 3	(Brazil)	Brazil
	Argentina	(Argentina)	0 – 0 (pen. 4 – 2)	(Colombia)	Colombia

3rd place

29 November 2015
	Mexico	(Mexico)	1 – 2	(Colombia)	Colombia

Final

29 November 2015
	Brazil	(Brazil)	2 – 0	(Argentina)	Argentina

== Rankings ==
Rank	Team
1	Brazil
2	Argentina
3	Colombia
4	Mexico
5	El Salvador
6	Haiti
7	Costa Rica

2015 Amputee Football Cup of America

Brazil
Third title
