= Our Lady of Itatí =

Roman Catholic title of the Virgin Mary in Argentina

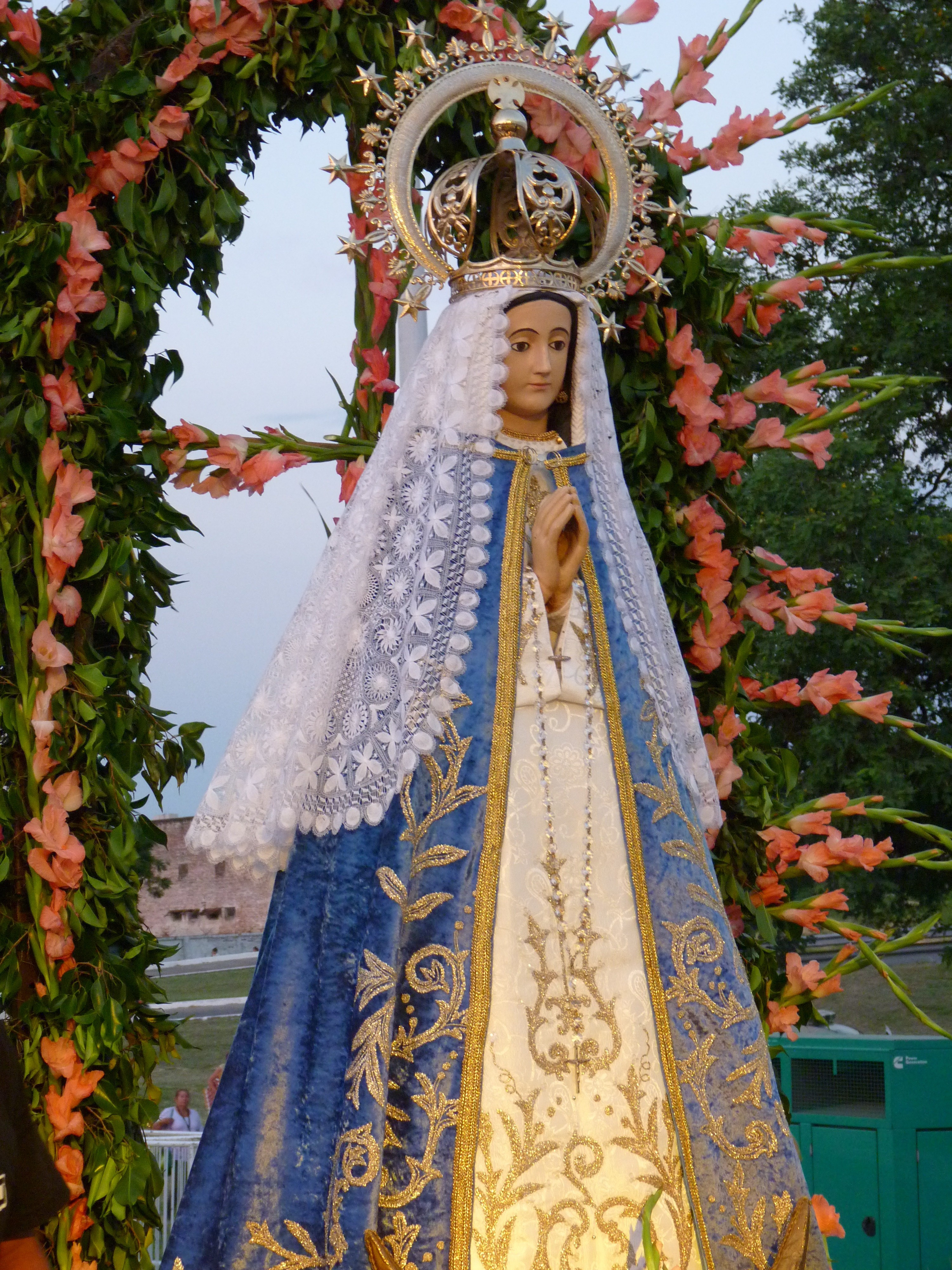

Patroness of Corrientes
- Venerated in: Roman Catholic Church
- Major shrine: Basilica of Our Lady of Itatí, Itatí, Argentina
- Feast: 9 July
- Attributes: Statue of the Virgin Mary in prayer, blue embroidered mantle, solar crown, veil
- Patronage: Corrientes Province, Roman Catholic Archdiocese of Corrientes

Our Lady of Itatí (Spanish: Nuestra Señora de Itatí), also known as the Virgin of Itatí, is a Roman Catholic title of the Virgin Mary, whose principal shrine is in the city of Itatí, Corrientes Province, Argentina. Her feast day is celebrated on July 9, with an anniversary celebration on July 16.

== Etymology ==
Itatí is a guarani word which is composed of «Ita» (rock) and «tí» (white, for the color of the lime deposits there).

== History ==
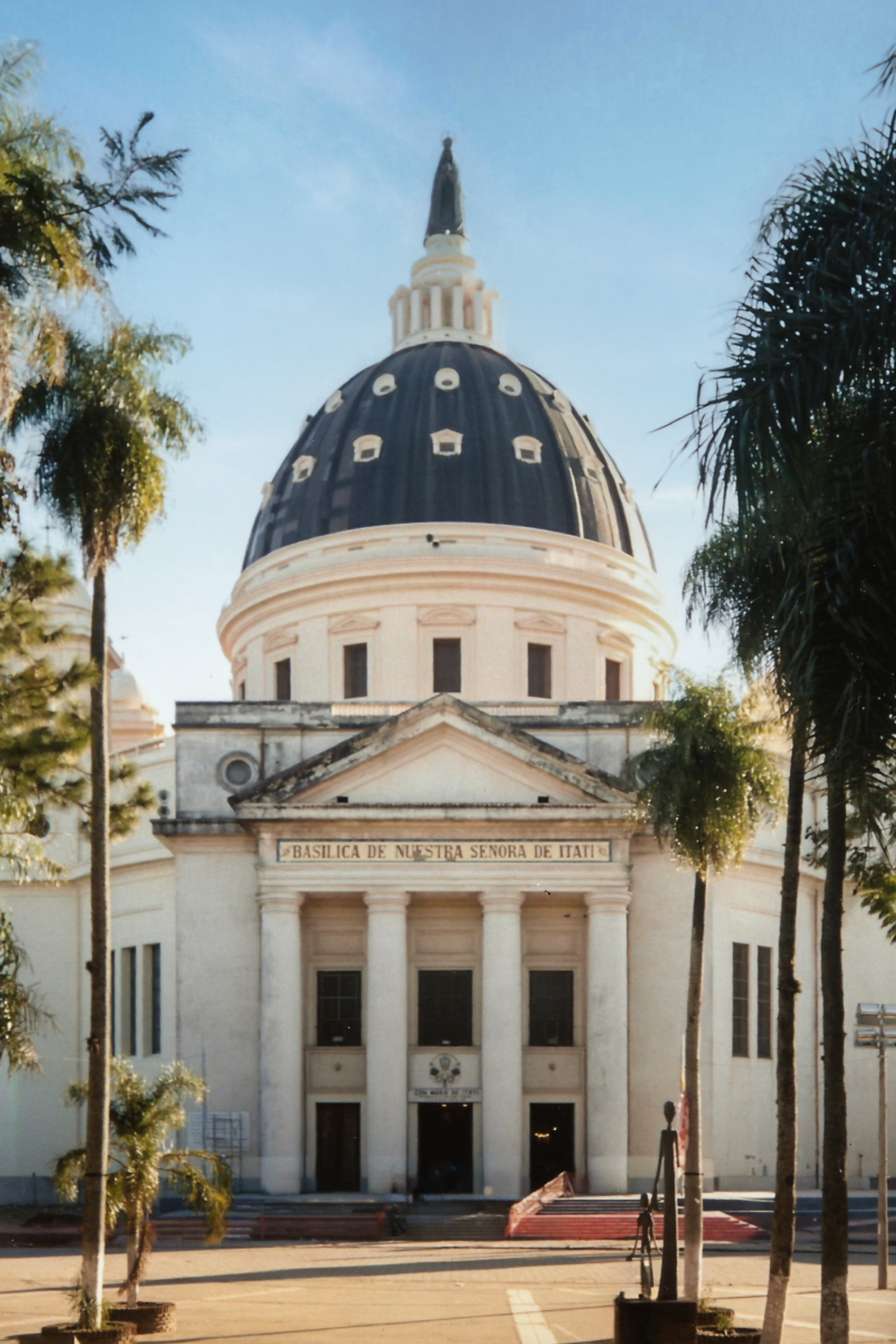
Basilica of Our Lady of Itatí.

The first Franciscan community settled in the Santa Ana area, also known as the Reduction of Yaguari, in 1528. The reflection of the Lady of Itatí appeared three times under a rock along a river of the Paraná Basin, which led the Franciscan settlers to build a statue dedicated to the Lady of Itatí in 1589.

Shortly afterwards, local Indians fought against the Franciscans and captured the statue. Then they questioned the precise location of the apparition of the Itatí Virgin, and claimed to have found another rock from which a bright light and a surnatural sound emanated. Franciscans and Indians agreed on a place for the Virgen, and created the new city Pueblo de Indios de la Pura y Limpia concepción de Nuestra Señora de Itatí. The shrine played a central role in reducing the water currents of the region to enable settlements to be built.

According to legend, the wooden representation of the Virgin Mary saved the life of 17th-century Jesuit missionary, Luis de Bolaños, known for his attempts to convert the natives to Catholicism. It is also said that the Virgin intervened in a battle between two native tribes, resulting in the victory of the tribe with the conquerors' aid.

On July 16, 1900, the statue of Our Lady was granted a Canonical Coronation under the pontificate of Pope Leo XIII, who proclaimed the statue as the patron saint of Corrientes, and creating the diocese of Corrrientes. In 1950, a basilica to enshrine the image was built with one of the tallest domes in South America.

== Description ==
The shrine and its dome are one of the largest Catholic pilgrimage sites in Argentina, visited by about 300,000 pilgrims annually.

The wooden statue of the Lady of Itatí is 126 centimeters high. She holds her hands in a position of oration, and wears a blue coat and a white undercoat.
