= Fabrizio de Miranda =

Italian engineer (1926–2015)

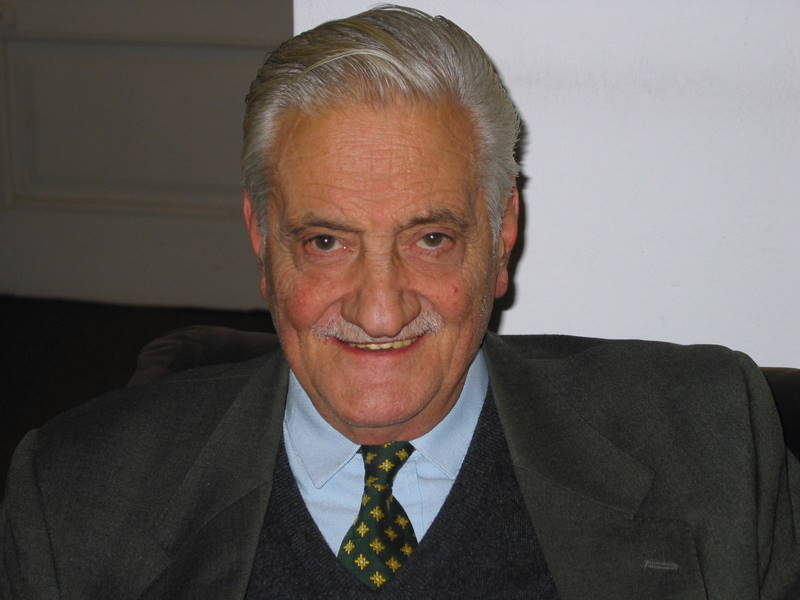
- Born: 30 October 1926; Naples, Italy
- Died: 21 January 2015 (aged 88); Milan, Italy
- Education: University of Naples
- Engineering career
- Discipline: Structural engineer
- Institutions: Professor at Politecnico di Milano from 1965 until 1996 and member of Italian College of the Technicians of the steel (CTA) (President from 1970 until 1972).
- Practice name: Studio De Miranda Associati - Milan (Italy)
- Projects: Zarate-Brazo Largo Bridge - Indiano Bridge - Rande Bridge, Viadotto Italia
- Significant design: Cable stayed bridge across Strait of Messina - ex aequo first prize at international design competition (1969). Spans: 200+225+540+1300+540+225+200 m.
- Awards: 1978 European awards ECCS-CECM-EKS for the Indiano Bridge (Italy) - 1979 European awards ECCS-CECM-EKS for Rande Bridge (Spain)

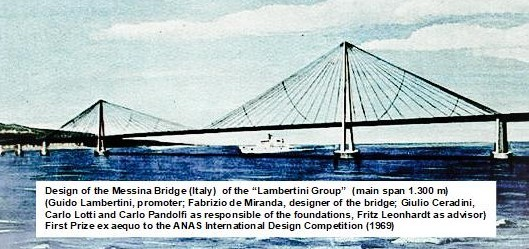
Design of Messina Bridge of the Lambertini Group - First prize ex aequo at the international design competition (1969).

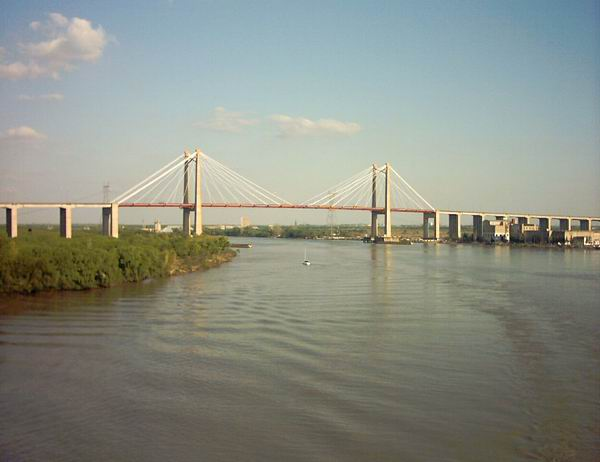
Zarate-Brazo Largo Bridge over the Paranà Guazù and Paranà de las Palmas Rivers in Argentina. They are the two first road and railway long span cable-stayed steel bridges in the world. Spans: 110 m + 330m + 110 m. (1969–1976)

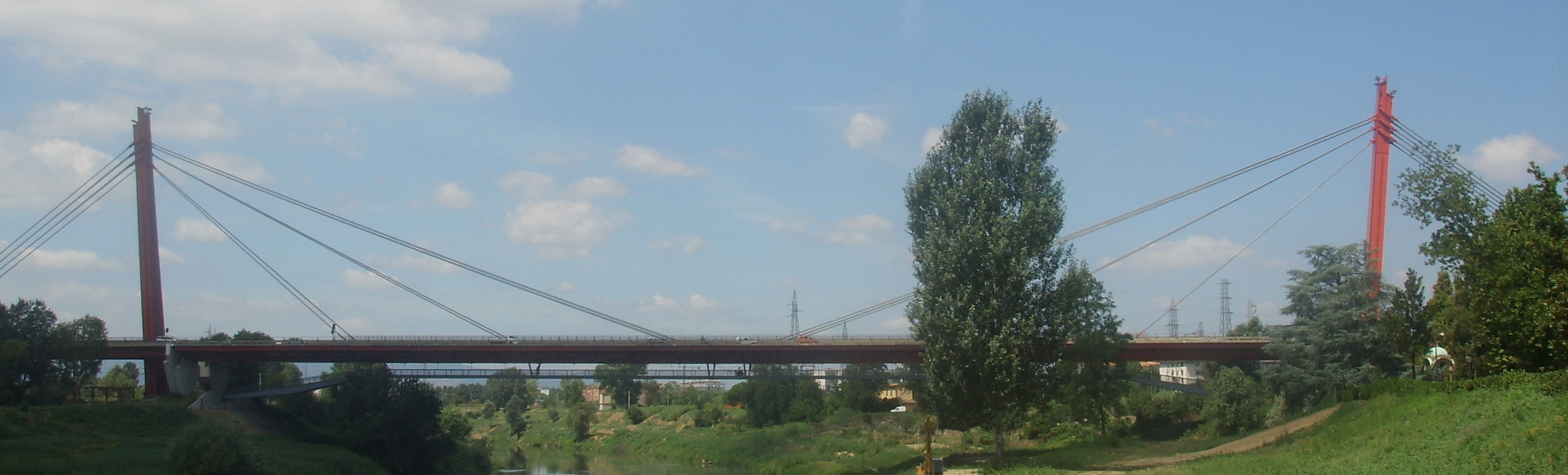
Indiano Bridge across the Arno river near Florence (Italy) (1972-1978). It is the first earth-anchored cable-stayed steel bridge in the world. Span: 206 m

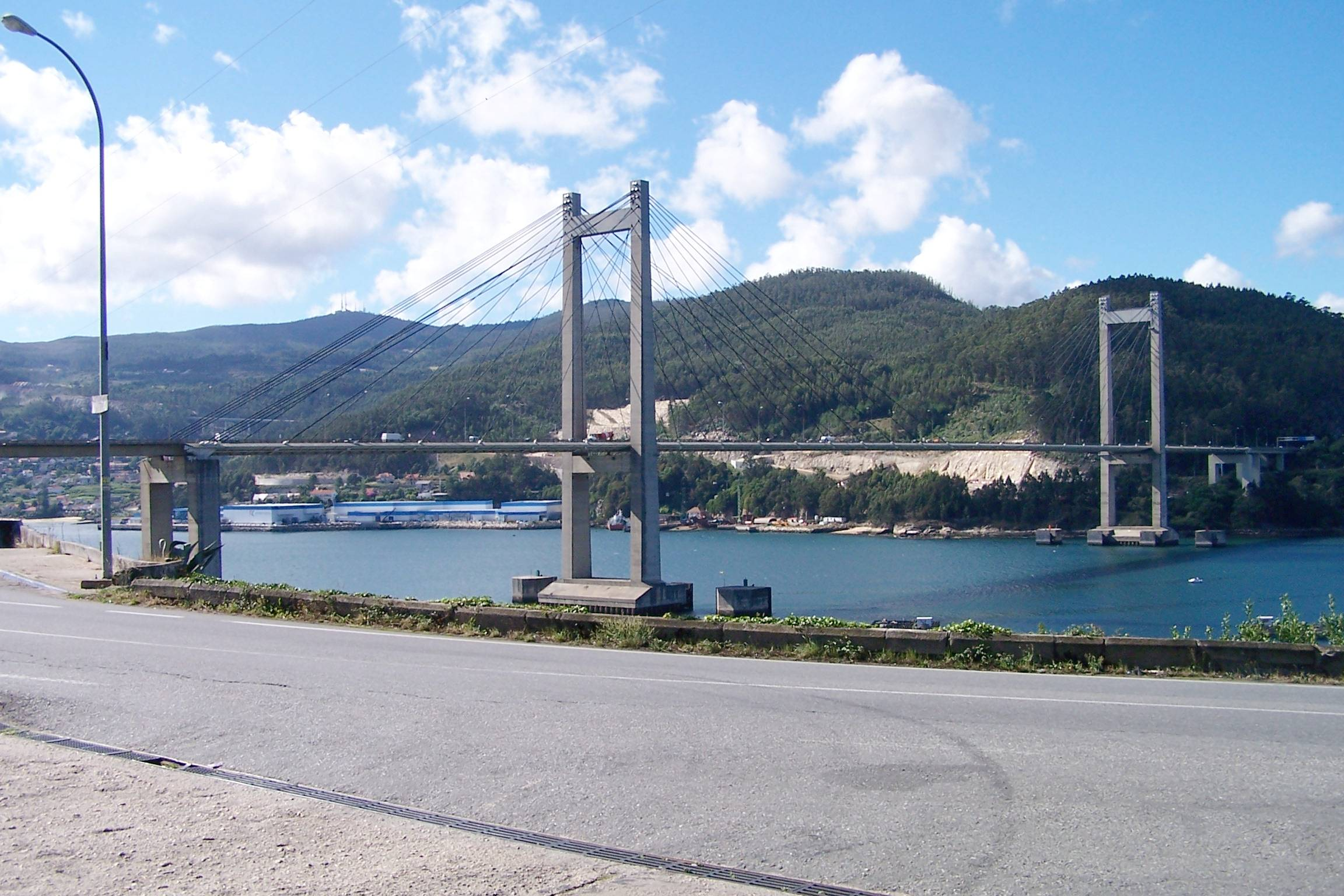
Rande Bridge near Vigo in Spain (1973-1977). It is the highway cable stayed bridge with the longest and slenderest span in the world at the time of construction. Three long spans of 148 m + 400m + 148 m.

Fabrizio de Miranda (30 October 1926 – 21 January 2015) was an Italian bridges and structural engineer and university professor.

== Career ==
Fabrizio de Miranda graduated with a degree in civil engineering in 1950 from the University of Naples. Beginning in 1955 he introduced in Italy steel-concrete composite structures, mainly in the field of bridges. He planned the first motorway viaducts with steel structure (Coretta, Macinaie, Poggio Palina) on the Autostrada del Sole in Italy (1959). In 1959, he became managing director of the largest Italian steelwork company, "Costruzioni Metalliche Finsider S.p.A." in Milan, which was under his management until 1967. From 1965 until 1996, he was professor of "Tecnica delle costruzioni" (structural engineering) at Politecnico di Milano. He successfully participated in numerous National and International Design Competitions of bridges including the first prize ex aequo to the International Competition for the Messina Bridge as member of the Lambertini Group (1969). He was among the Founders and then President (in 1970–1973) of the Italian College of the Steel Structures Technicians (CTA).

In 1968, Fabrizio de Miranda founded a Consulting Engineering Firm specializing in the design of Bridges and Structures. During more than fifty years of professional activity, he designed hundreds of structures and bridges. Notable projects include the elevated highways in Genoa (1963–1965), in Fiorenza-Milan (1961) and in San Lorenzo-Rome (1969–1976), the viaducts and the Indiano Bridge across the Arno river near Florence (1972–1978), all in Italy; the Zarate-Brazo Largo Bridges in Argentina (1969–1976), and the Rande Bridge in Spain (1973–1977). He died in Milan on 21 January 2015.

== Publications in English ==
- De Miranda F., 1964, Hollow steel sections in the RAI-TV Centre-Turin, n. 12/1964 "Proceedings CIDECT 1964", London 1964.
- De Miranda F., 1966, The role of steelwork in Italian Multi-Storey Buildings – Proceedings B.C.S.A. Dec. 1966.
- De Miranda F., 1968, New concepts for elevated highways, Proceedings B.C.S.A. – London. 24–26 June 1968.
- De Miranda F. e Mele M., 1973, Some basic design principles for steel box girder bridges, In London 13-14 febbraio 1973. Proceedings Institution Civil Engineers.
- De Miranda F., et al., 1979, Basic problems in long span cable stayed bridges, – Rep. n. 25 – Department of Structures – University of Calabria – Arcavacata (CS), ill., (224 p.) 1979.
- Autori vari & De Miranda F., 1983, A contribution to the theory of long span cable-stayed bridges, 11e Congres Association Internationale des Ponts ed Charpentes.
- De Miranda F., 1988, Design – Long Span Bridges, International Symposium on steel bridges. London, 24-25 marzo 1988. In "Costruzioni Metalliche" n. 4/1988.
- De Miranda F., 1991, Some basic problems in the design of long span cable stayed bridges, in Problemi avanzati nella costruzione dei ponti, a cura di G. Creazza e M. Mele, Collana di Ingegneria Strutturale n.7, pp. 91–120, Ed. CISM (International Centre for Mechanical Sciences), Udine 1991. ISBN 88-85137-06-7.
- De Miranda F., 1991, The three Mentalities of Successful Bridge Design, in Bridge Aesthetics around the world, Ed. Transportation Research Board – National Research Council, Washington, D.C., U.S.A. 1991.

== Bibliography in Italian ==
- Renato Airoldi, Il concorso per il nuovo ponte sull'Adda a Paderno, in Casabella, n° 469, 1981, pp. 17–25.
- Doniselli I., Fabrizio De Miranda: ponti e strutture, in Costruzioni Metalliche, n° 5, 1994.
- Gigliola Meneghini, Fabrizio De Miranda nella storia dei ponti in acciaio, tesi di laurea, relatore Enzo Siviero, correlatore Stefania Casucci. – 1999. – 2 v. : ill.; 30 cm; Istituto universitario di architettura di Venezia. Biblioteca Centrale IUAV TESI 1999 131-32.
- Studio De Miranda Associati, Fabrizio de Miranda, raccolta delle pubblicazioni dal 1951 al 2004, Milano, 2004.
- L. Andreini, Ponte all'Indiano a Firenze, in Rassegna di Architettura e Urbanistica, n. 117, pp. 127–134, Università degli Studi "La Sapienza", Roma 2005.
- Centro Studi del Consiglio Nazionale degli Ingegneri, (a cura di), Fabrizio de Miranda, in L'ingegneria dei ponti del Novecento, Catalogo della Mostra itinerante del 2006, pp. 42–43, Gangemi Editore, Roma 2006.
- De Nardi Diego, Fabrizio De Miranda, Angelo Villa, Lodovico Tramontin. Il padiglione centrale della fiera di Pordenone, Ed. Il Poligrafo (collana Territori dell'architettura. Opere), 2006, ISBN 88-7115-511-4.
- Marcello Zordan, Il contributo di Fabrizio de Miranda alla costruzione metallica del secondo novecento in Italia, in Rassegna di Architettura e Urbanistica n. 121/122, pp. 149–158, Università degli studi "La Sapienza", Roma 2007.
- Gianluca Capurso e Patrizia Fermetti (a cura di), Fabrizio de Miranda, in "Rassegna di Architettura e Urbanistica", n. 121/122, p. 165, Università degli Studi "La Sapienza", Roma 2007.
