= Rosario-Victoria Bridge =

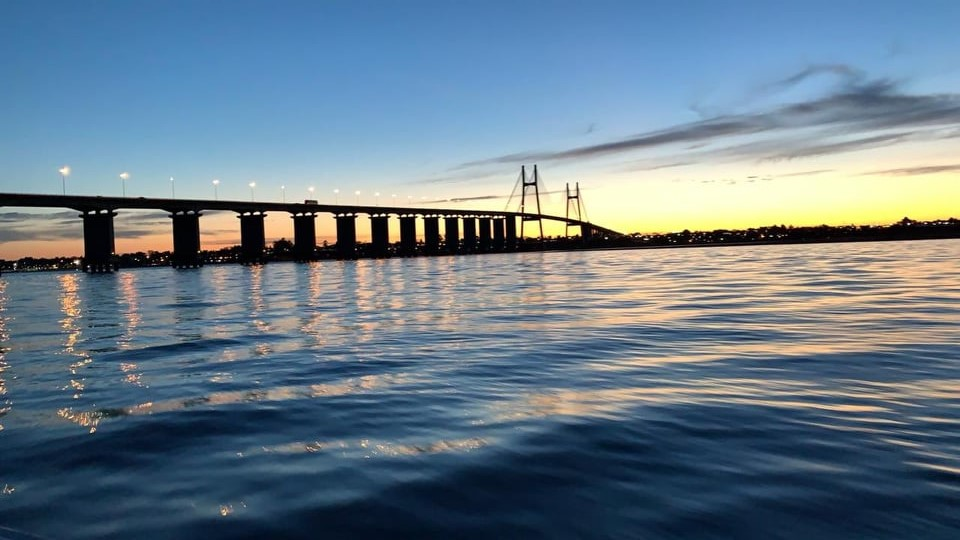
- A view of the bridge from Rosario
- Coordinates: 32°52′09″S 60°40′44″W
- Carries: National Route 174
- Crosses: Paraná River
- Locale: Rosario, Santa Fe and Victoria, Entre Ríos
- Official name: Nuestra Señora del Rosario
- Preceded by: Uranga-Begnis Tunnel
- Followed by: Zárate-Brazo Largo Bridge

Characteristics
- Design: cable-stayed bridge
- Total length: 4,098 metres (13,445 ft)
- Longest span: 350 metres (1,150 ft)
- Clearance below: 50 metres (160 ft)

History
- Construction start: 1997
- Opened: May 22, 2003

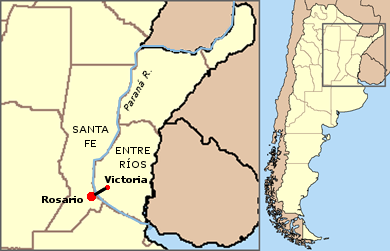
Location of the bridge in Argentina

Rosario-Victoria Bridge (in Spanish, Puente Rosario-Victoria) is the informal name of the physical connection between the Argentine cities of Rosario (province of Santa Fe) and Victoria (province of Entre Ríos).

This roadlink is composed of several bridges, viaducts and earth-filled sections. It crosses the main course of the Paraná River and touches down on several islands of the Paraná Delta in the way.

Works on the project began in 1998, but they were repeatedly interrupted due to lack of continued funding from the national and the provincial state, especially in the worst part of the Argentine economic crisis of 2001. Public transit access to the bridge was opened on May 22, 2003.

The link between the two cities spans a total of 59.4 kilometers (36.9 miles). The total length of the various bridges and their viaducts is 12.2 km (7.6 mi). The main bridge is 4,098 meters (13,445 feet) long, with central cable-stayed span of 350 meters (1,150 feet). Among the materials used were about 250,000 cubic meters (326,987 yd³) of concrete, 63,000 tons of ADN-420 type steel, and 17,618 tons of asphalt. The access to the main bridge on the western side is in the northern border of Rosario, on the limit with the city of Granadero Baigorria. The official name of the main bridge (cable-stayed) is Nuestra Señora del Rosario (Our Lady of Rosario).

The project was executed by a private company (Puentes del Litoral S. A.), which was granted subsidies from the national state and the provincial states of Santa Fe and Entre Ríos, totalling about $385 million. The company received the operation and maintenance concession of the bridge for 25 years.

Until the opening of this bridge, the only road link between the two provinces, and between two commercially very important regions of Argentina, was the Hernandarias Subfluvial Tunnel which joins the cities of Santa Fe and Paraná, about 120 kilometers (75 miles) north from Rosario. The southern Paraná is crossed by another cable-stayed bridge, the Zárate-Brazo Largo Bridge, joining Entre Ríos and Buenos Aires province.

== See also ==
- List of bridges
