= 2013 Amputee Football Cup of America =

Tournament details
- Host country: Brazil
- City: Cataguases
- Dates: 7–8 Sep
- Teams: 4
- Venue: 1

Final positions
- Champions: Brazil (2nd title)
- Runners-up: Mexico
- Third place: Mexico
- Fourth place: Argentina

Tournament statistics
- Matches played: 8

The 2013 Amputee Football Cup of America was the 2nd edition of the international competition of amputee football national men's teams in America. It was organized by the World Amputee Football Federation (WAFF), and was held in Cataguases, Brazil between 7 and 8 September 2013.

Brazil won the title for the second time, defeating Mexico (North) in the final. Mexico (South) became bronze medalist before Argentina.

== Participating nations ==
Following three nations competed in the tournament. Mexico was represented by two teams: North and South.

- Argentina
- Brazil
- Mexico

== Preliminary round ==
Four teams competed in a round-robin tournament. Top two teams qualified for the final, and the third and fourth teams qualified for the bronze medal match.

Team	Pld	W	D	L	GF	GA	GD	P
Brazil	3	3	0	0	?	0	?	9
Mexico (North)	3	?	?	?	?	?	?	?
Argentina	3	?	?	?	?	?	?	?
Mexico (South)	3	?	?	?	?	?	?	?

8 September 2013
	Brazil	(Brazil)	2 – 0	(Argentina)	Argentina

== Medal matches ==
3rd place

8 September 2013
	Mexico (South)	(Mexico)	1 – 1 (pen. W – L)	(Argentina)	Argentina

Final

8 September 2013
	Brazil	(Brazil)	2 – 0	(Mexico)	Mexico (North)

== Rankings ==
Rank	Team
1	Brazil
2	Mexico
3	Mexico
4	Argentina

2013 Amputee Football Cup of America

Brazil
Second title
