= Raúl Uranga – Carlos Sylvestre Begnis Subfluvial Tunnel =

Coordinates: 31°42′05″S 60°30′13″W

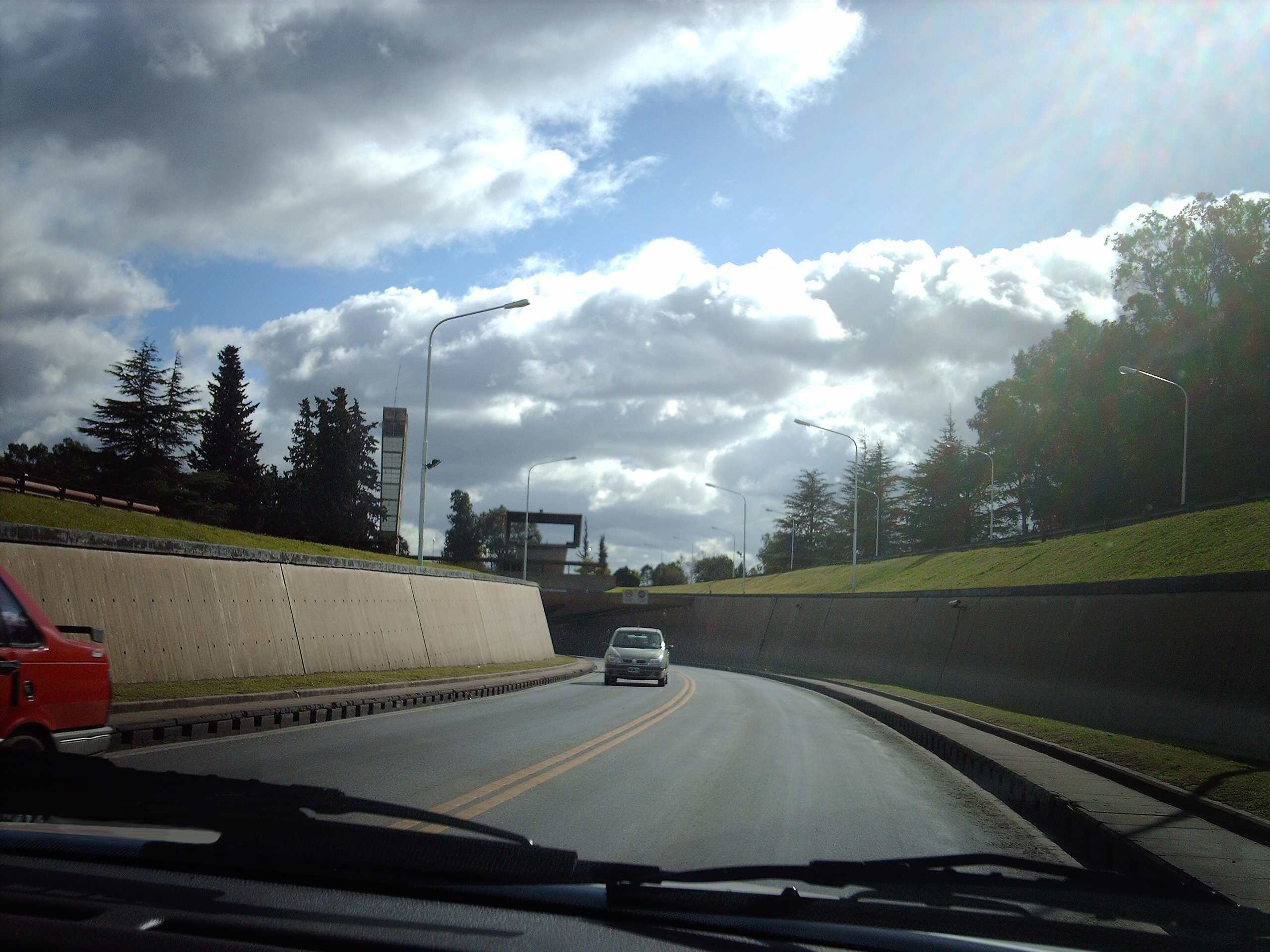
- The approach to the tunnel
- Interactive map of Raúl Uranga – Carlos Sylvestre Begnis Subfluvial Tunnel

Overview
- Location: Santa Fe, Santa Fe and Paraná, Entre Ríos
- Waterway: Paraná River
- Route: National Route 168

Operation
- Work began: February 3, 1962
- Opened: December 13, 1969

Technical
- Length: 2,397 metres (7,864 ft)
- No. of lanes: 2

The Raúl Uranga – Carlos Sylvestre Begnis Subfluvial Tunnel (Spanish: Túnel Subfluvial Raúl Uranga – Carlos Sylvestre Begnis), formerly known as the Hernandarias Subfluvial Tunnel, is an underwater road tunnel that connects the provinces of Entre Ríos and Santa Fe in Argentina, crossing the Paraná River between the capital of Entre Ríos, Paraná, and Santa Cándida Island, 15 km (9.3 mi) from Santa Fe.

The tunnel was opened on 13 December 1969, after decades of rejected ideas, delays and frustrated projects (including the idea of using a cable-stayed bridge). The governors of the two provinces, Raúl Uranga and Carlos Sylvestre Begnis, signed a joint treaty authorizing the construction in 1960; the first stone was set in 1962, and the first tubes were built in 1966. Construction was undertaken by a consortium headed by Hochtief.

In 2004, traffic statistics on the tunnel counted 2,780,133 vehicles, of which almost 2.2 million were cars or motorcycles, and the rest were trucks (most of them 8- or 10-wheelers).

The tunnel is controlled by a board with representatives of both provinces, formally called Ente Interprovincial Raúl Uranga – Carlos Sylvestre Begnis.

Until the opening of the Rosario-Victoria Bridge, this was the only road link between two commercially important and populous regions of Argentina, and the only one between the two provinces (more to the south, Entre Ríos is connected to the province of Buenos Aires by the Zárate-Brazo Largo Bridge).

Its original name was in tribute to Hernando Arias de Saavedra (commonly referred to as Hernandarias), the first governor in South America descended from Europeans and born in the Americas. In 2001 the name was changed to honour the former governors of the two provinces who had initiated the project.

== Technical information ==
The tunnel is made of immersed tubes, each measuring 65.45 m and weighing 4,500 tonnes, with 50-cm-wide walls and an outer diameter of 10.8 m. The tube sections measure a total of 2,397 m, and at both ends there are access ramps, 270 m long. The road that goes inside the tunnel is 7.5 m wide, and the height from the road floor to the ceiling is 4.41 m. At its deepest point the tunnel is about 32 m under the average water level of the river.

== Gallery ==
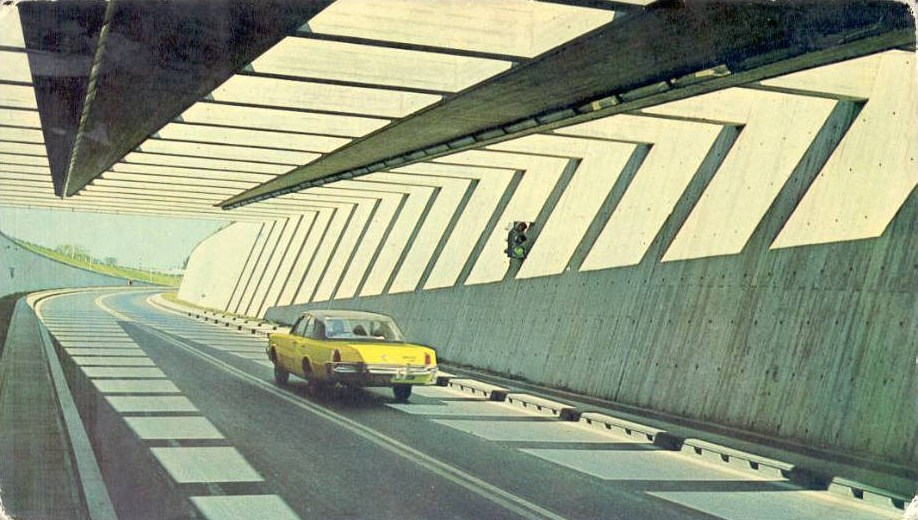
Tunnel exit (ca. 1970)

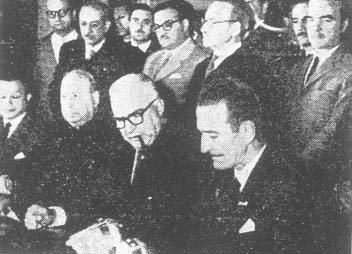
Governors Uranga (Entre Rios) and Sylvestre Begnis (Santa Fe) signing the treaty for the underwater tunnel

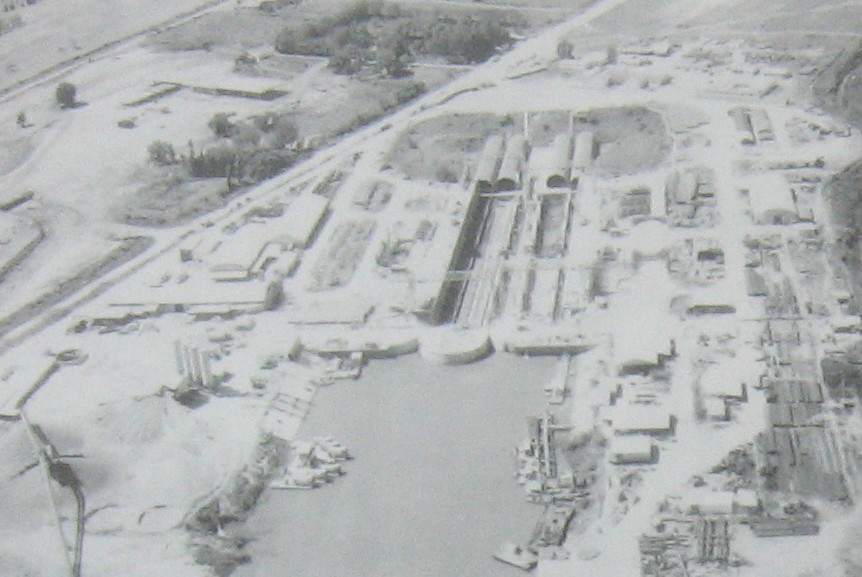
Aerial view of works in Paraná
