= Rande Bridge =

Rande Bridge Ponte de Rande
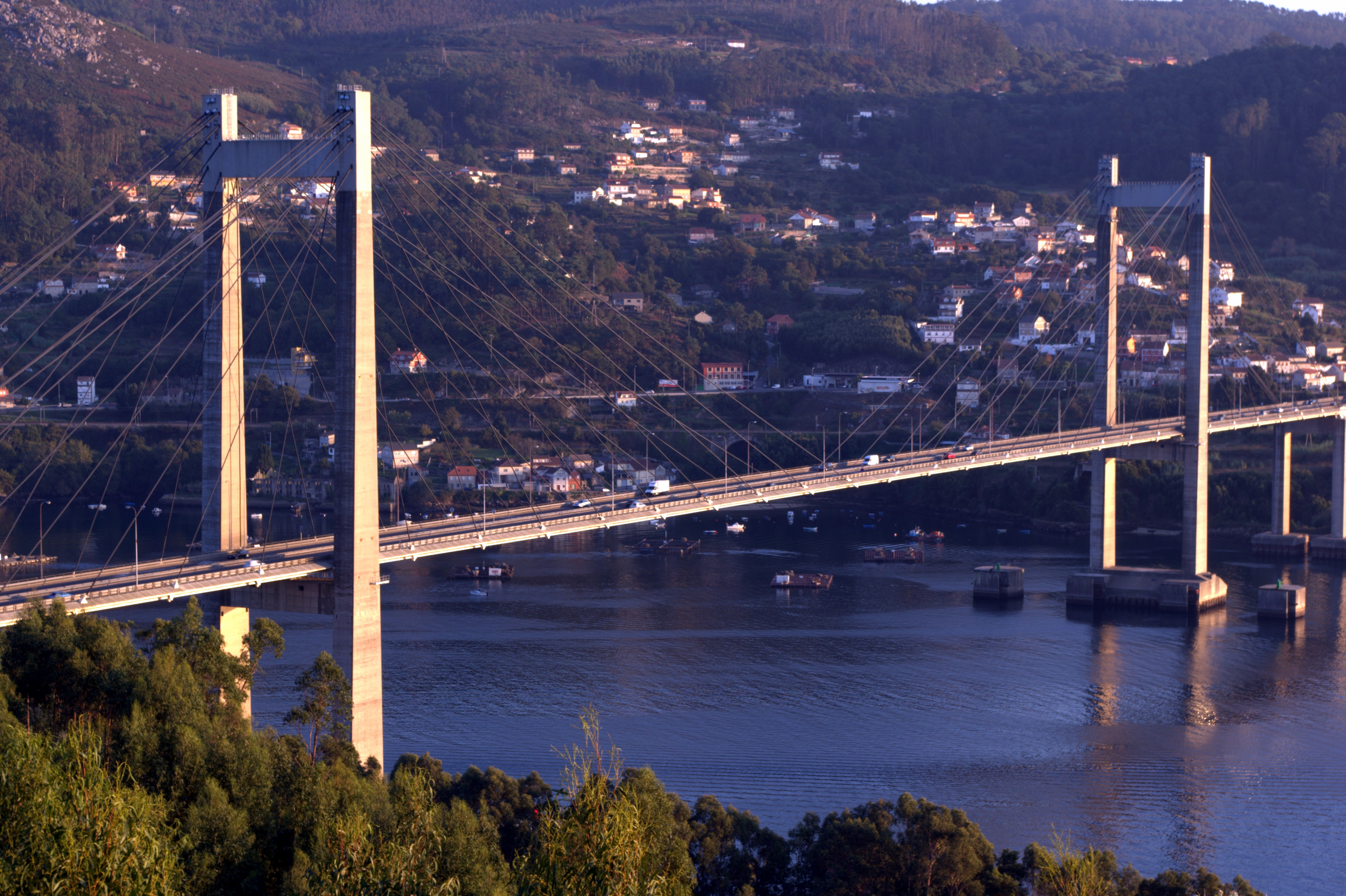
- The bridge before its widening
- Coordinates: 42.288080°N 8.66051°W
- Carries: Motor vehicles
- Crosses: Ria de Vigo
- Locale: Redondela - Moaña, Galicia, Spain
- Maintained by: Audasa

Characteristics
- Design: Cable-stay
- Material: Concrete
- Total length: 1,558 m (5,112 ft)
- Width: 23.46 m (77.0 ft)
- Height: 148 m (486 ft)
- Longest span: 401 m (1,316 ft)
- No. of spans: 3
- Piers in water: 4

History
- Designer: Fabrizio de Miranda; Florencio del Pozo; Alfredo Passaro
- Construction start: 1973
- Construction end: 1978
- Opened: 1981

Statistics
- Daily traffic: 50,000

Location
- Interactive map of Rande Bridge

The Rande Bridge (Galician: Ponte de Rande, Spanish: Puente de Rande) is a cable-stayed bridge 9 kilometres from the city of Vigo and 18 kilometres from the city of Pontevedra, in the Province of Pontevedra, Spain. It spans Vigo bay across the Rande Strait, linking the municipalities of Redondela and Moaña.

== History ==
It was designed by Italian engineer Fabrizio de Miranda, the Spaniard Florencio del Pozo (who was also in charge of its foundations), and Alfredo Passaro. The bridge was built in 1978 and opened in 1981, just over a year before start of the 1982 FIFA World Cup. It forms part of the AP-9 motorway. It was exclusively a toll bridge until 2006, when it became a shadow toll stretch.

It has a length of 1,604 metres, its pillars have a height of 148 metres and its main span measures 401 metres. Although it was not the biggest (cable-stayed) span in the world when it opened, it was the longest span with more than two lanes.

It currently carries around 50,000 vehicles per day. Since its opening to traffic in 1981, more than 230 million vehicles have passed through it. It did cost 3,658 million pesetas to build at the time.

Due to the increase in traffic, plans were drawn up to widen the bridge by adding one extra lane in each direction. In February 2015, work on the widening project began, with an estimated investment of €107.9 million. The new lanes were opened to traffic on 30 December 2017.

== See also ==
- Battle of Vigo Bay, hold in the area
- Vigo, Pontevedra, Moaña and Cangas, Pontevedra, the places linked

== Sources ==
- (it) De Miranda F., Leone A., Passaro A., 1979, Il ponte strallato sullo stretto di Rande presso Vigo, in "Costruzioni Metalliche", 2/1979.
- (it) De Miranda F., 1980, I ponti strallati di grande luce, Zanichelli Bologna (I), pp. 259–269.
