= Italia Viaduct =

Italia Viaduct Viadotto Italia
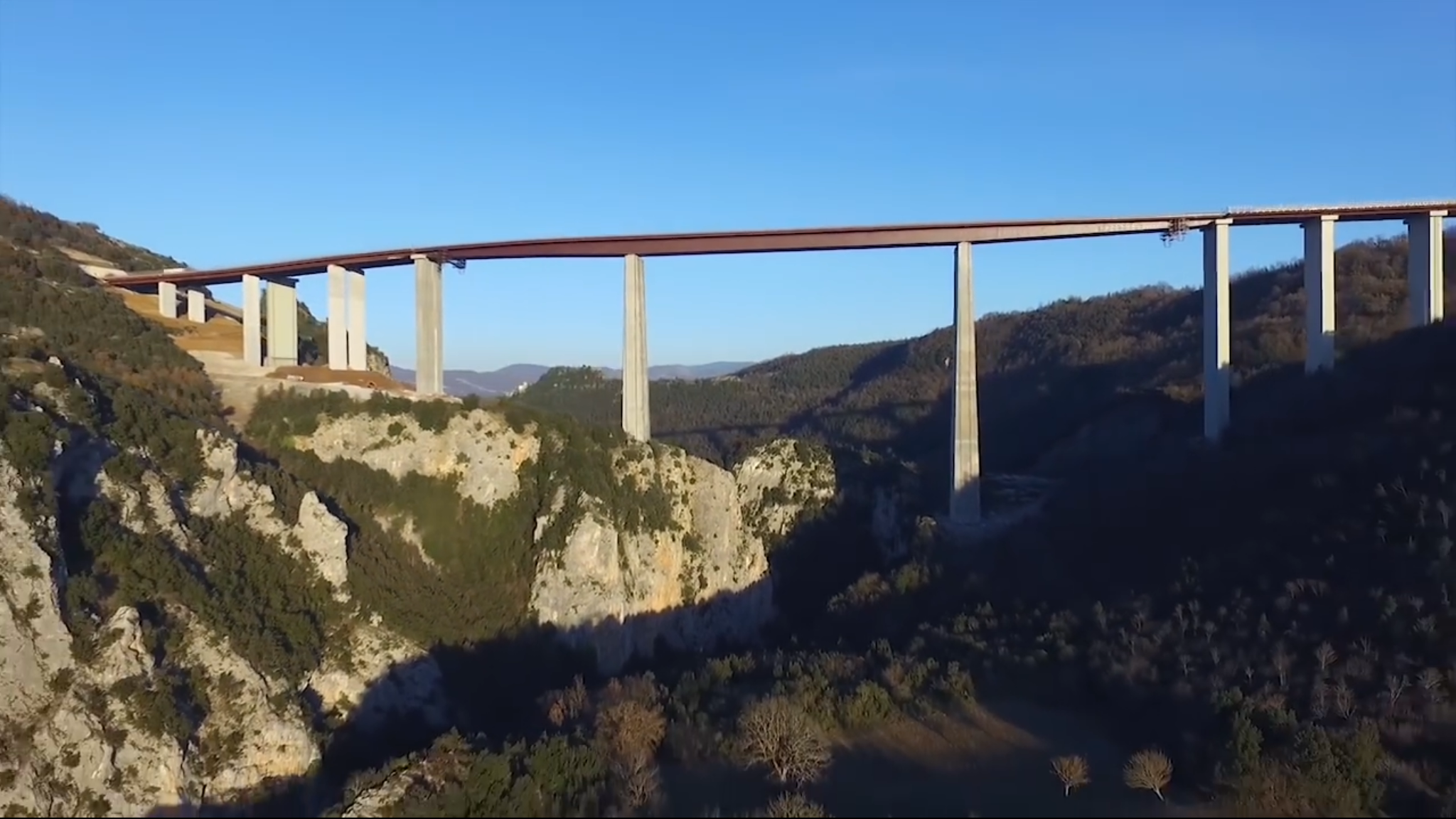
- Coordinates: 39.9389°N 15.9593°E
- Carries: Autostrada A2 (Italy)
- Crosses: Lao River
- Locale: Laino Borgo, Calabria, Italy

Characteristics
- Design: Beam bridge
- Material: Steel
- Total length: 1,120 metres (3,670 ft)
- Height: 260 metres (850 ft)
- Longest span: 175 metres (574 ft)

History
- Architect: Fabrizio de Miranda
- Opened: 1974

Location
- Interactive map of Italia Viaduct

Italia Viaduct is a 260-metre-high (850 ft) viaduct near Laino Borgo, Calabria, Italy. It is the highest bridge in Italy, and was the second highest bridge in the world when it opened in 1974. As of 2026, it is among the eighty highest bridges in the world and second in europe. The bridge is located on Autostrada A2 Salerno-Reggio Calabria Motorway between Laino Borgo and Mormanno and crosses the Lao River Gorge.

== See also ==
- List of highest bridges in the world
- Fabrizio de Miranda
