= Wanda, Argentina =

Coordinates: 25°58′S 54°35′W

Wanda
- Municipality and town
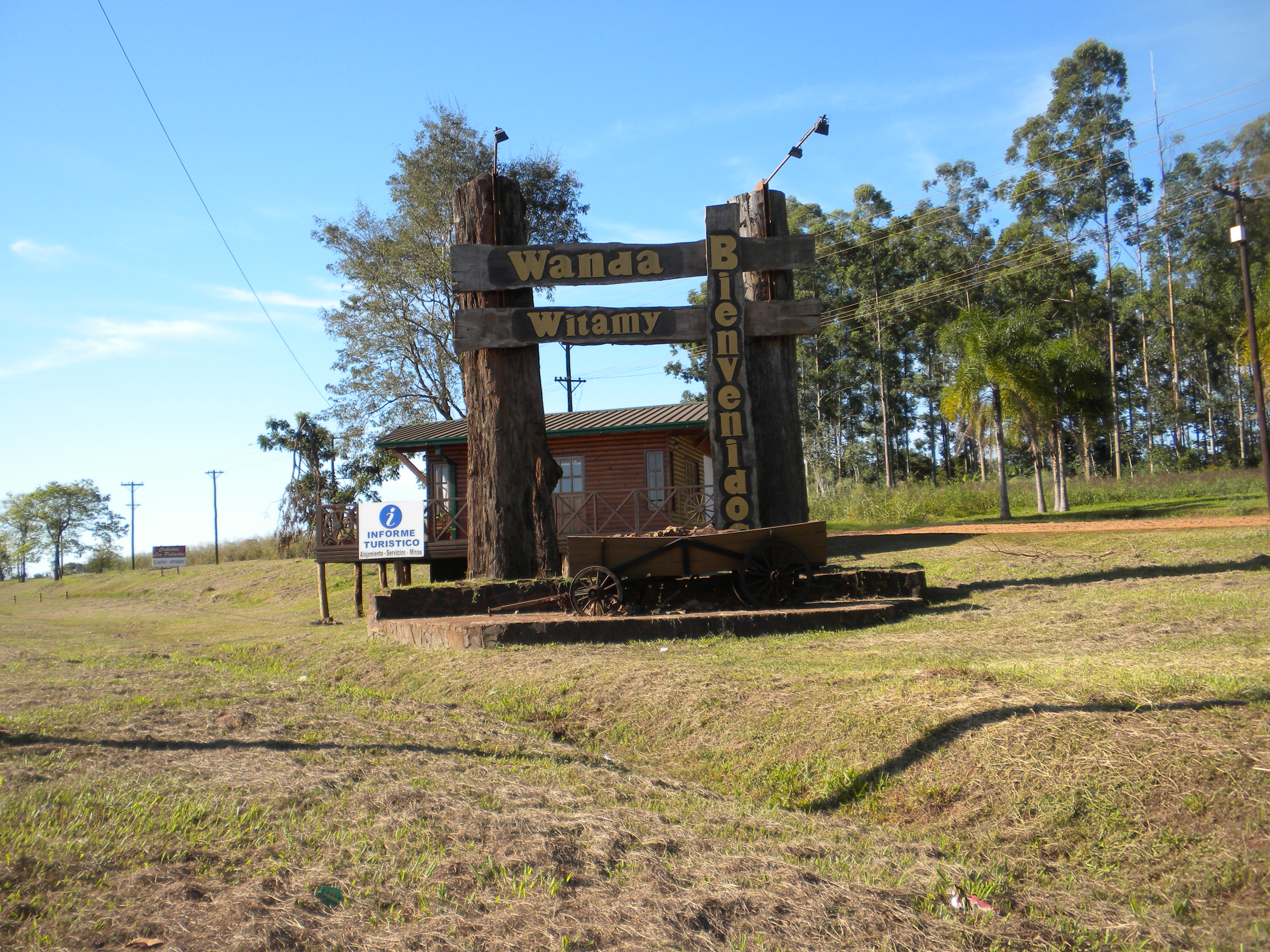

- Flag
- Interactive map of Wanda
- Country: Argentina
- Province: Misiones
- Department: Iguazú

Population
  - Total: 15,529
- 2010
- Time zone: UTC−3 (ART)
- CPA: N3376

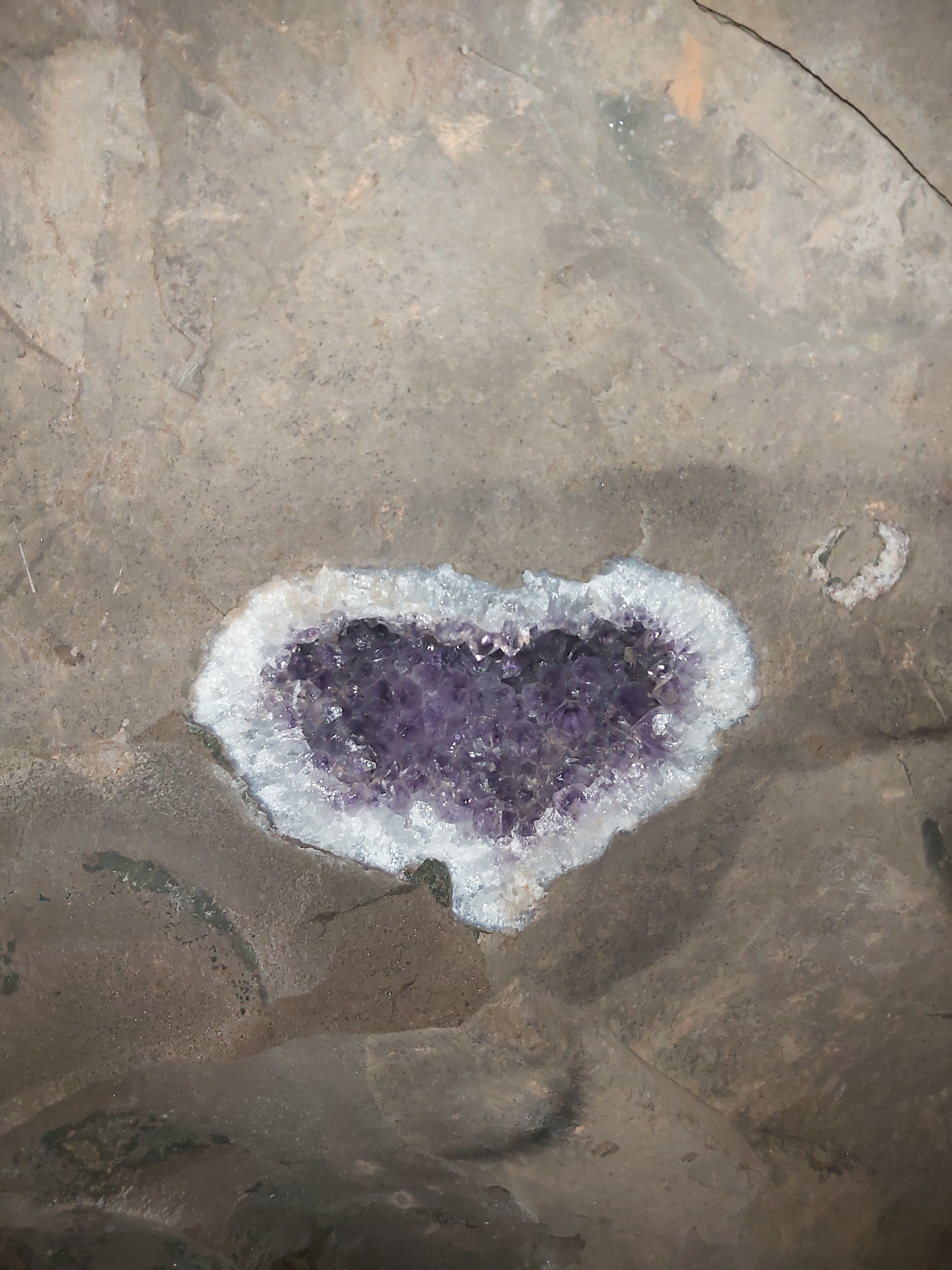
Amethyst geode in Wanda mines.

Wanda is a town and municipality in Misiones Province in north-eastern Argentina. It is part of Iguazú Department. The municipality based around the town is called Colonia Wanda, however, the town itself is generally called simply Wanda.

In 2010, 15,529 people were registered in the entire municipality, of which 13,901 lived in the urban area; in 2001, 11,799 were registered in the urban area, which represents an increase of 18% in 10 years. It is only 55 kilometers from the Iguazú Falls, and is an obligatory stop for tourists touring the province, visiting the precious stone mines. At present, it is the second tourist destination of choice within the province.

Wanda is well connected to the rest of the country by National Route 12, which connects it with Puerto Iguazú, Posadas and Buenos Aires. Wanda is also the origin of Provincial Route 19, the only access route to the city of Andresito and the international bridge that connects the latter with Capanema, in Brazil.

The main economic activity is forestry, as around half of the municipality's land is covered by reforested forests. Tourism and the cultivation of yerba mate are also important to the town's economy as well.
