= Diamante, Entre Ríos =

Diamante
- City
- Location of Diamante in Argentina
- Coordinates: 32°04′08.3″S 60°38′17.9″W
- Country: Argentina
- Province: Entre Ríos
- Department: Diamante

Government
  - Intendant: Ezio Gieco (Juntos por Entre Rios)

Area
  - Total: 104 km^{2} (40 sq mi)

Population (2010 census)
  - Total: 19,142
  - Density: 184/km^{2} (477/sq mi)
- Time zone: UTC−3 (ART)
- CPA base: E3105
- Dialing code: +54 343

Diamante is a city in the west of the province of Entre Ríos, Argentina, on the eastern shore of the Paraná River. It has about 20,000 inhabitants as per the 2010 census [INDEC]. It is the head town of the Diamante Department. Its name means "diamond" in Spanish.

The town of Diamante was founded on 27 February 1836, and became a first-class municipality on 13 May 1872.

The city used to be called "Punta Gorda", but Justo José de Urquiza had the name changed to Diamante in 1852 when his army passed through the area on his way to invade the Buenos Aires Province during the Platine War. The invasion culminated in the Battle of Caseros, in which Argentina and Urquiza emerged victorious.

Thomas Jefferson Page explored the Paraná during the Rio de La Plata Expedition, which he led. The expedition's two aims were to map the Rio de La Plata estuary and the surrounding rivers of Uruguay and Parana for commerce, and to conduct various scientific studies for the Smithsonian Institution. In September 1853, the expedition began studying Diamante's coastline and surrounding areas, as it was situated at the Parana River's mouth and alongside the river's delta (Paraná Delta). It used the USS Water Witch (1851) and chartered a steamship from the United States and Paraguay Company called the La Yerba to survey the surrounding area.

== Notable people ==
- Stella Maris Olalla, politician
