= Zárate–Brazo Largo Bridge =

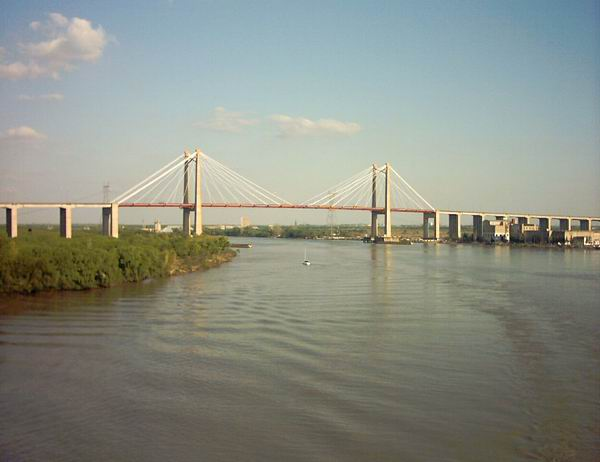
- The Zárate–Brazo Largo Bridge
- Coordinates: 34°06′11″S 59°00′10″W
- Carries: National Route 12, General Urquiza Railway
- Crosses: Paraná River
- Locale: Zárate, Buenos Aires, and Brazo Largo, Entre Ríos
- Official name: Complejo Unión Nacional
- Preceded by: Rosario-Victoria Bridge

Characteristics
- Design: Cable-stayed bridge
- Total length: 550 m (1,804 ft)
- Longest span: 330 m (1,083 ft)

History
- Construction start: November, 1971
- Opened: December 14, 1977

Location
- Interactive map of Zárate–Brazo Largo Bridge

The Zárate–Brazo Largo Bridges are two cable-stayed road and railway spanning the Paraná River delta to connect the Argentine provinces of Buenos Aires and Entre Ríos designed Fabrizio de Miranda and constructed between 1971 and 1977, the bridges consists of two identical 550-meter bridges located 30 kilometers apart: the "Bartolomé Mitre" spanning the Paraná de las Palmas, and the "Justo José de Urquiza" over the Paraná Guazú. Elevated 50 meters above the water to accommodate big ships.

== Characteristic ==
The bridge spans the Paraná River, connecting the Entre Ríos Province and Buenos Aires with both a four-lane highway and a railway line. The bridges consist of two identical bridges located 30 kilometers apart, each stretching 550 m (1,804 ft) in total length with a main span of 330 m (1,083 ft) and a lateral span of 110 m (361 ft). To accommodate large ships, the bridges are elevated 50 m (164 ft)above the water.Specifically, the bridges links the cities of Zárate and Brazo Largo, and the bridges crosses two branches of the Paraná Delta. The bridge spanning the Paraná de las Palmas is named "Bartolomé Mitre" in honor of the former Argentine president, while the bridge over the Paraná Guazú is named "Justo José de Urquiza" after Argentina's first constitutional president.

== History ==
The open tender was processed in December 1970, with the contract signed in April 1971. Construction began in November 1971, with the first bridge completed in February 1977 and the second in November of that same year. It was designed by Fabrizio de Miranda. The bridges were repaired in 1998 after the tension bridge in Justo José de Urquiza broke in November 1996
