= Diamante Department =

Diamante Departamento Diamante
- Department
- Location of Diamante Department within Entre Ríos Province

- Location of Diamante in Argentina
- Coordinates: 32°03′S 60°36′W
- Country: Argentina
- Province: Entre Ríos Province
- Seat: Diamante

Area
  - Total: 2,774 km^{2} (1,071 sq mi)

Population (2022)
  - Total: 53,595
  - Density: 19.32/km^{2} (50.04/sq mi)

Diamante is a department of the province of Entre Ríos, Argentina.
