= Iguazú Department =

Iguazú Departamento Iguazú
- Department
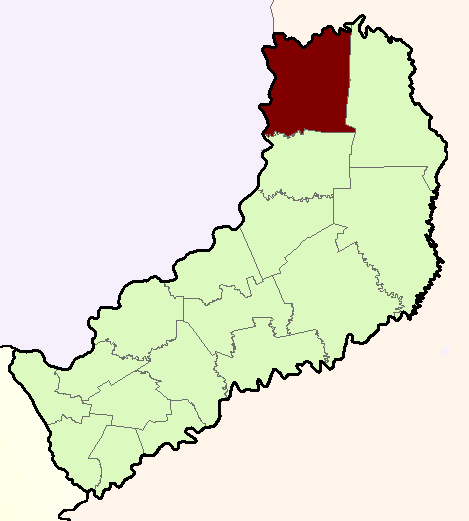
- Iguazú is a department of Misiones Province
- Interactive map of Iguazú
- Country: Argentina
- Province: Misiones
- Seat: Puerto Esperanza

Area
  - Total: 2,769 km^{2} (1,069 sq mi)

Population (2022)
  - Total: 100,096
  - Density: 36.15/km^{2} (93.62/sq mi)

Iguazú is a department of Misiones Province (Argentina).
