= San Ignacio, Argentina =

San Ignacio
- Municipality and town
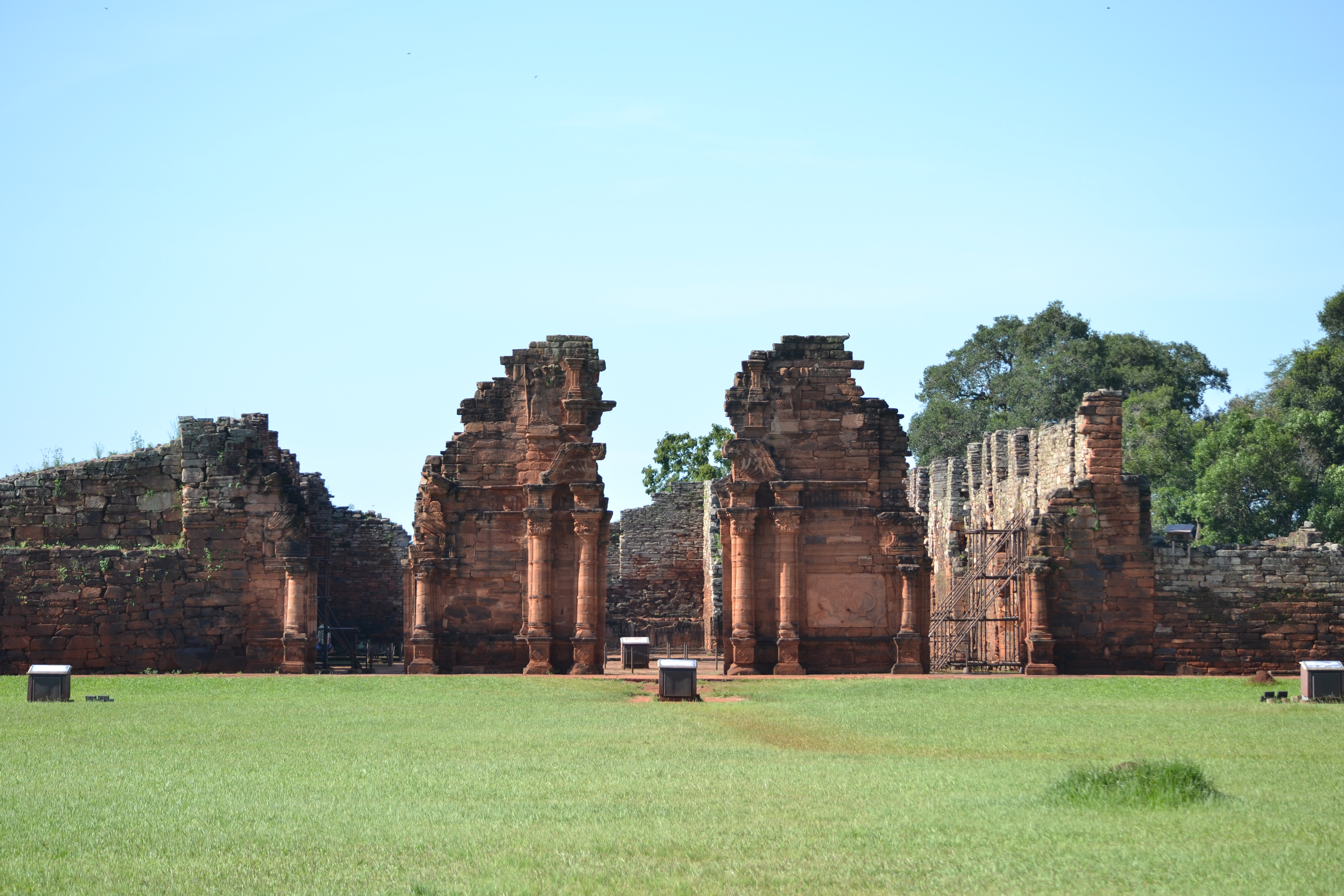
- The Ruins of San Ignacio Miní, San Ignacio, Argentina

- Flag

- Location within Argentina Location within Misiones Province
- Coordinates: 27°15′30″S 55°32′21″W
- Country: Argentina
- Province: Misiones
- Department: San Ignacio

Government
  - Intendant: Javier Peralta

Area
  - Total: 351 km^{2} (136 sq mi)
- Elevation: 157 m (515 ft)

Population
  - Total: 7,772
- Time zone: UTC−3 (ART)
- CPA base: N3322

San Ignacio is a town and municipality in Misiones Province in north-eastern Argentina.

== Sister cities ==
San Ignacio is twinned with:

- San Ignacio, Paraguay
