= Esquina, Corrientes =

Esquina Ekína (Guarani)
- City
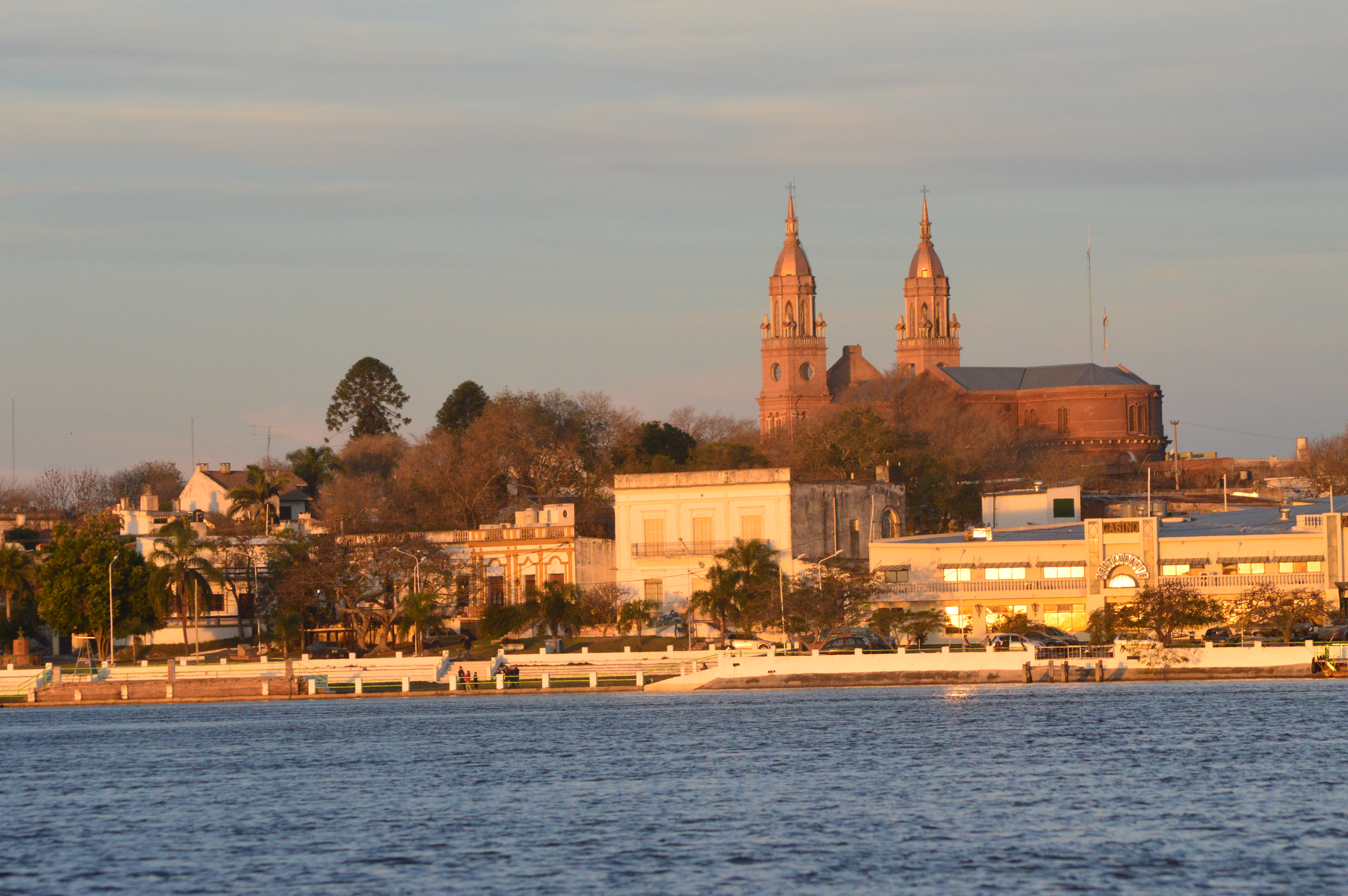

- Location of Esquina in Argentina
- Coordinates: 29°09′S 59°15′W
- Country: Argentina
- Province: Corrientes
- Department: Esquina

Population
  - Total: 26,399
- Demonym: Esquinense
- Time zone: UTC−3 (ART)
- CPA base: W3196
- Dialing code: +54 3777

Esquina (Guarani: Ekína) is a city in Corrientes Province, Argentina. It is the capital of the Esquina Department.

== History ==
The city of Esquina was found by Benito Lamela in 1806, who gave the name to the city. In April 2016, a major flood caused a large portion of the city to be underwater. Over 300 people were evacuated, and the height of floodwaters reached at least 1 m (3.3 ft) in some neighborhoods.

== Festivals ==
In January and February, many tourists visit Esquina to enjoy the street carnivals.

In March, the town hosts the Fiesta Nacional del Pacú, a fishing competition which attracts around 25,000 visitors.

== Notable people ==
Both parents of Diego Maradona were raised in Esquina.

== See also ==
- Esquina Department
