= Paraná Department =

Paraná Departamento Paraná
- Department
- Location of Paraná Department within Entre Ríos Province
- Country: Argentina
- Province: Entre Ríos Province
- Seat: Paraná

Area
  - Total: 4,974 km^{2} (1,920 sq mi)

Population (2022)
  - Total: 391,696
  - Density: 78.75/km^{2} (204.0/sq mi)

Paraná is a department of the province of Entre Ríos, Argentina.
