= Esquina Department =

Esquina Department Departamento Esquina (Spanish) Tetãvore Ekína (Guarani)
- Department
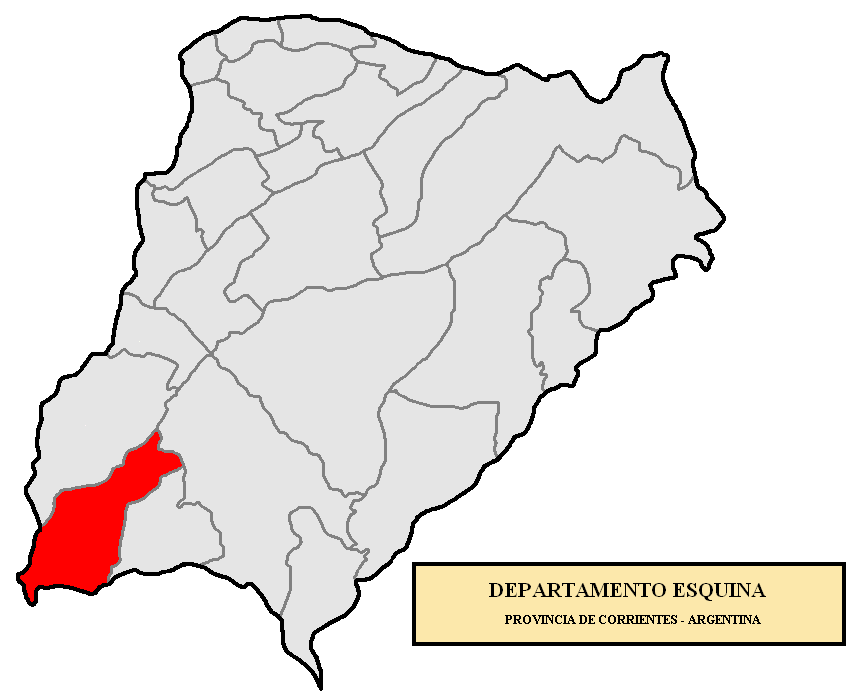
- location of Esquina Department in Corrientes Province
- Coordinates: 30°0′S 59°24′W
- Country: Argentina
- Seat: Esquina

Area
  - Total: 3,723 km^{2} (1,437 sq mi)

Population (2001 census [INDEC])
  - Total: 30,372
  - Density: 8.158/km^{2} (21.13/sq mi)
- Postal Code: W3196
- Area Code: 03777
- Website: web.archive.org/web/20070927234134/http://www.esquina.gov.ar/

Esquina Department is a department of Corrientes Province in Argentina.

The provincial subdivision has a population of about 30,000 inhabitants in an area of 3,723 km^{2} (1,437 sq mi), and its capital city is Esquina, which is located around 760 km (470 mi) from Capital Federal.

== Settlements ==
- Esquina
- Puerto Libertador
