= Brazo Largo =

Coordinates: 33°47′S 58°36′W

- Village
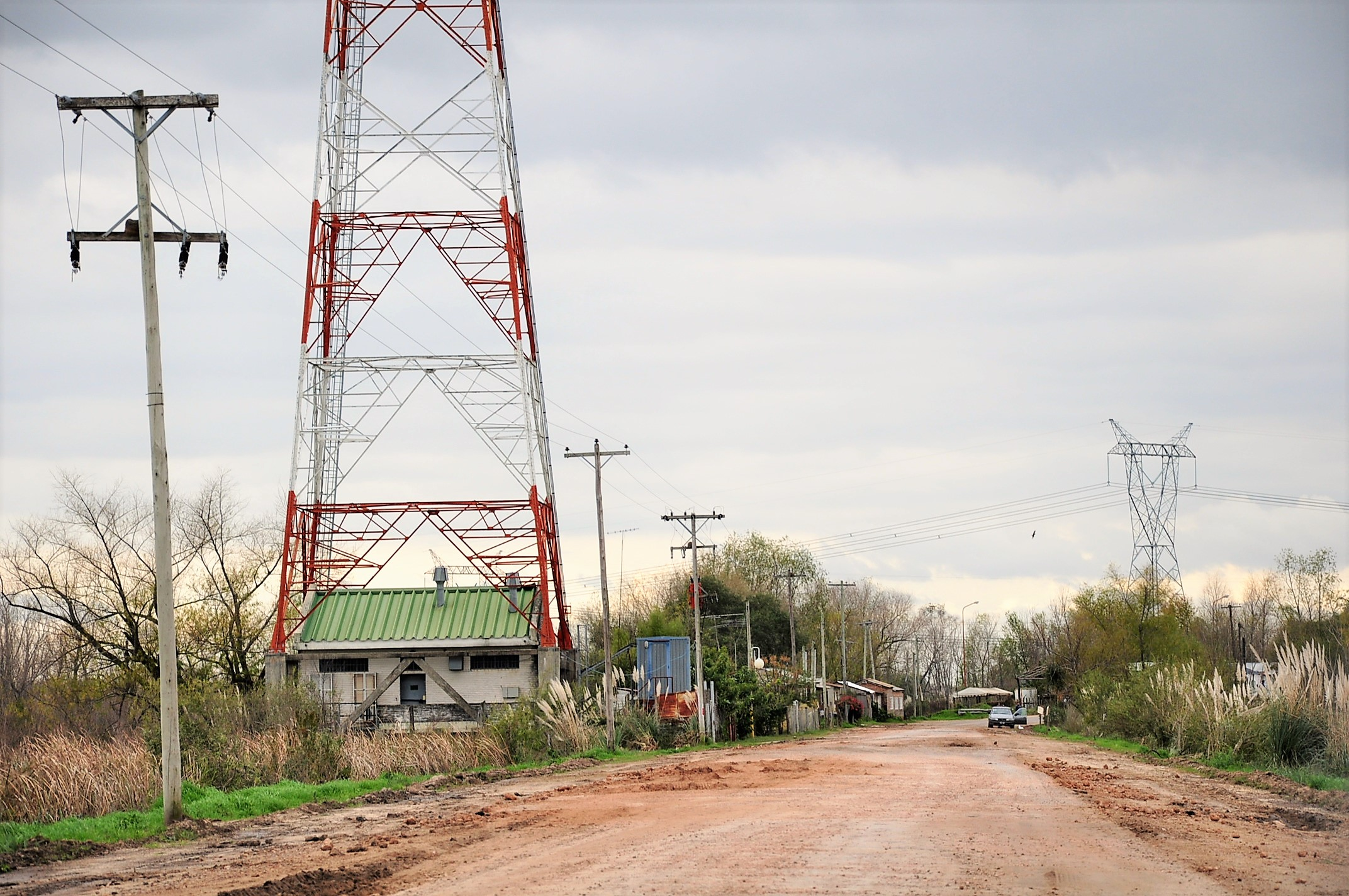
- Main street in Brazo Largo
- Interactive map of Brazo Largo
- Country: Argentina
- Province: Entre Ríos Province
- Department: Islas de Ibicuy
- Municipality: Villa Paranacito
- Time zone: UTC−3 (ART)

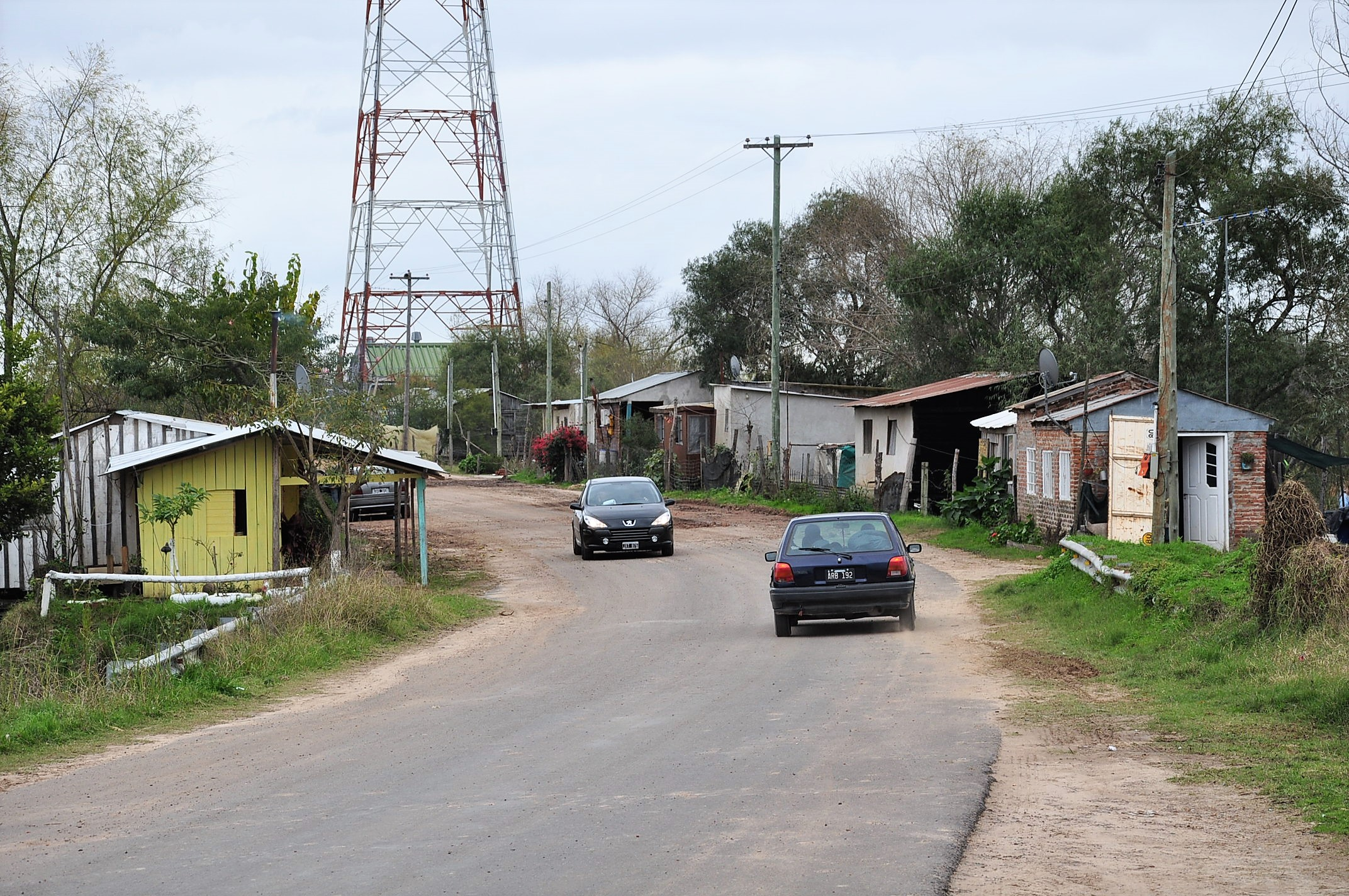
Brazo Largo

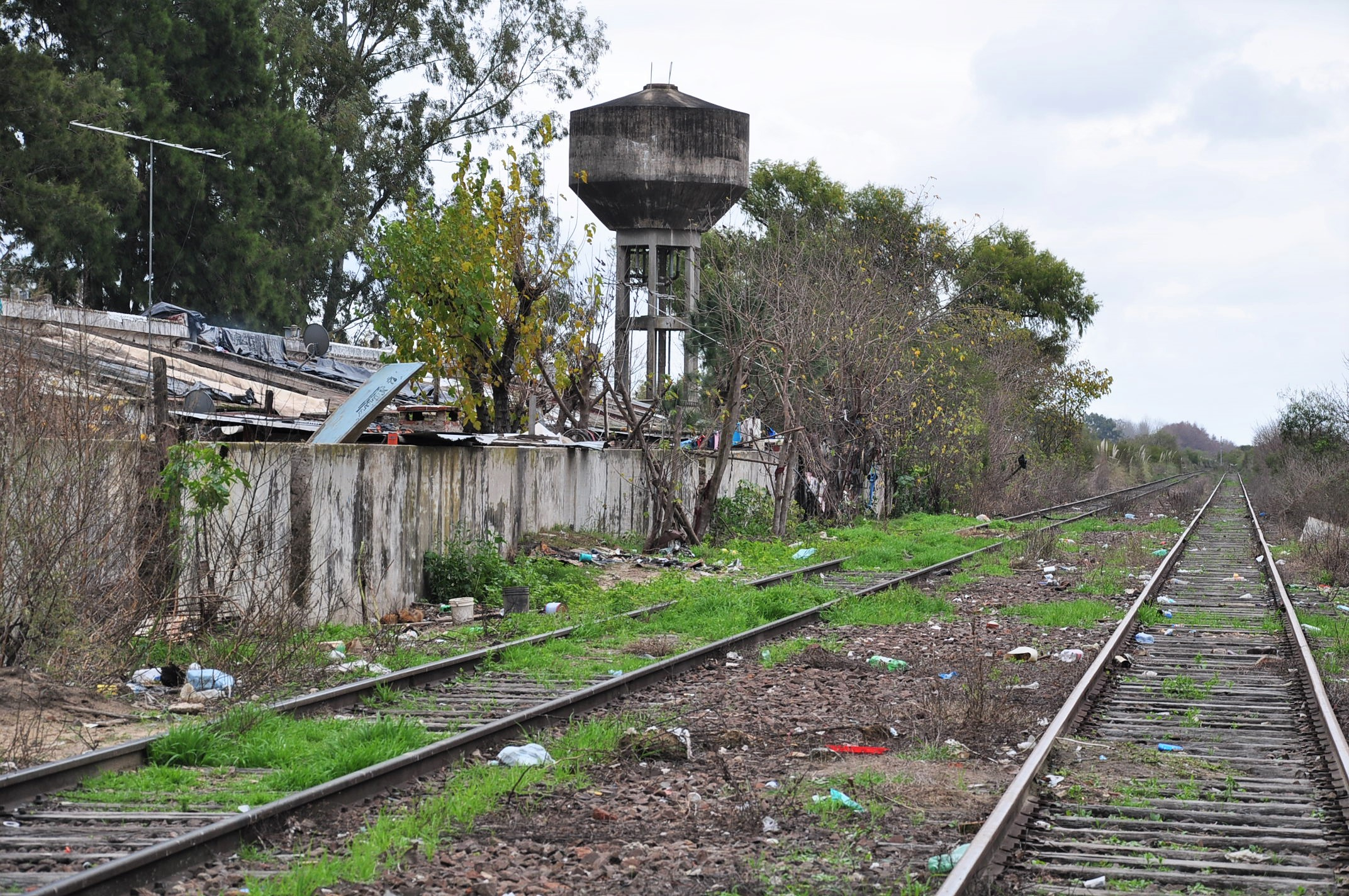
Hamlet adjacent to the Brazo Largo railway station, some 8 km west of the village itself

Brazo Largo is a village in the municipality of Villa Paranacito in the Islas del Ibicuy department in Entre Ríos Province in north-eastern Argentina. There is a railway station some 8 km west of the village, along the General Urquiza Railway.
