= Crespo, Entre Ríos =

Crespo
- City

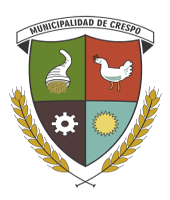
- Coat of arms

- Location of Crespo in Argentina
- Coordinates: 32°2′S 60°19′W
- Country: Argentina
- Province: Entre Ríos
- Department: Paraná
- Elevation: 87 m (285 ft)

Population (2010 census)
  - Total: 19,536
- Time zone: UTC−3 (ART)
- CPA base: E3116
- Dialing code: +54 343

Crespo is a city in the Argentine province of Entre Ríos, some 40 km from the provincial capital Paraná. It has around 19,500 inhabitants (as per the 2010 census [INDEC]), most of whom are descendants of Volga Germans who migrated from Russia to Argentina from 1875 onwards. The town's German heritage is reflected in the annual beer festival, based on the Oktoberfest but held in January. The economy is centered in avicultural and other agricultural products.

Successful footballer Gabriel Heinze (former player of Paris Saint Germain, Manchester United, Olympique de Marseille, Real Madrid, Real Valladolid and A.S. Roma) was born in Crespo.
