= Itatí Department =

Itatí Department Departamento Itatí (Spanish) Tetãvore Itatĩ (Guarani)
- Department
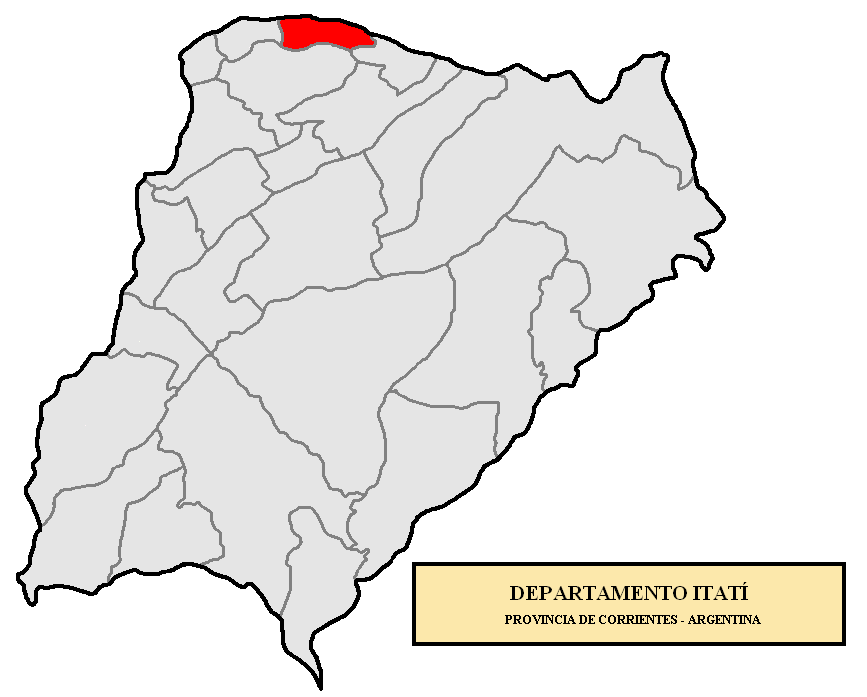
- location of Itatí Department in Corrientes Province
- Coordinates: 27°16′S 58°15′W
- Country: Argentina
- Seat: Itatí

Area
  - Total: 890 km^{2} (340 sq mi)

Population (2001 census [INDEC])
  - Total: 8,774
  - Density: 9.9/km^{2} (26/sq mi)
- Postal Code: W3414
- Area Code: 03783
- Website: web.archive.org/web/20071009143501/http://www.itati-corrientes.com.ar/

Itatí Department is a department of Corrientes Province in Argentina.

The provincial subdivision has a population of about 8,774 inhabitants in an area of 890 km^{2} (340 sq mi), and its capital city is Itatí, which is located around 1,095 km (680 mi) from Capital Federal.

== Settlements ==
- Itatí
- Ramada Paso
