= San Ignacio Department, Misiones =

San Ignacio Departamento San Ignacio
- Department
- Interactive map of San Ignacio
- Country: Argentina

Area
  - Total: 1,607 km^{2} (620 sq mi)

Population (2022)
  - Total: 63,394
  - Density: 39.45/km^{2} (102.2/sq mi)

San Ignacio Department is a department in Misiones Province, Argentina.
