= Itatí, Corrientes =

Itatí Itatĩ
- Town
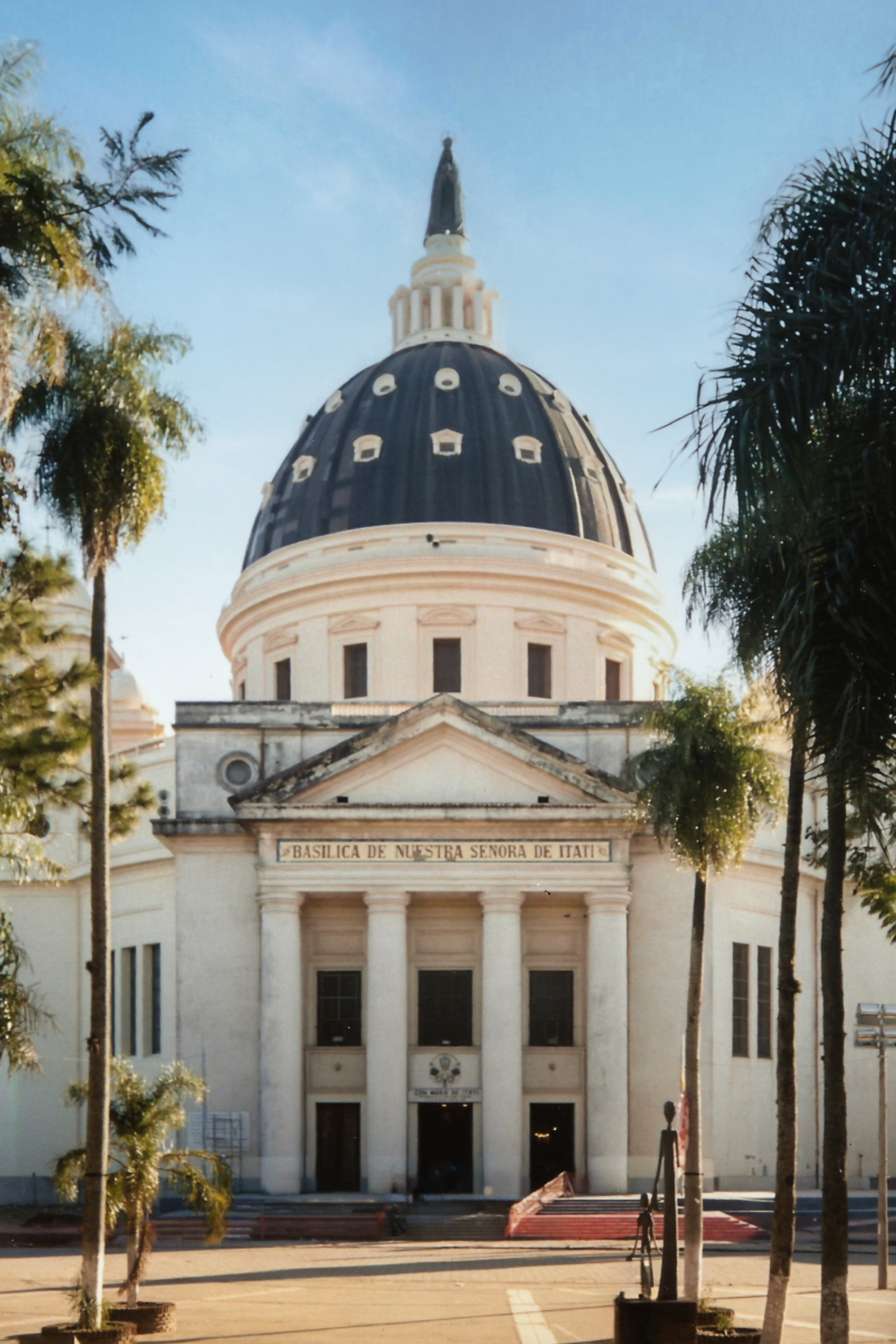
- Itatí basilica

- Location of Itatí in Argentina
- Coordinates: 27°16′S 58°15′W
- Country: Argentina
- Province: Corrientes
- Department: Itatí

Population
  - Total: 7,902
- Time zone: UTC−3 (ART)
- CPA base: W3414
- Dialing code: +54 3783

Itatí (Guarani: Itatĩ) is a town in the north of the province of Corrientes, Argentina. It has 7,902 inhabitants as per the 2001 census [INDEC]. It lies some 60 km east of the provincial capital Corrientes, by the Paraná River, not far upstream from its confluence with the Paraguay River, on the northern provincial border, which is also the international border with Paraguay.

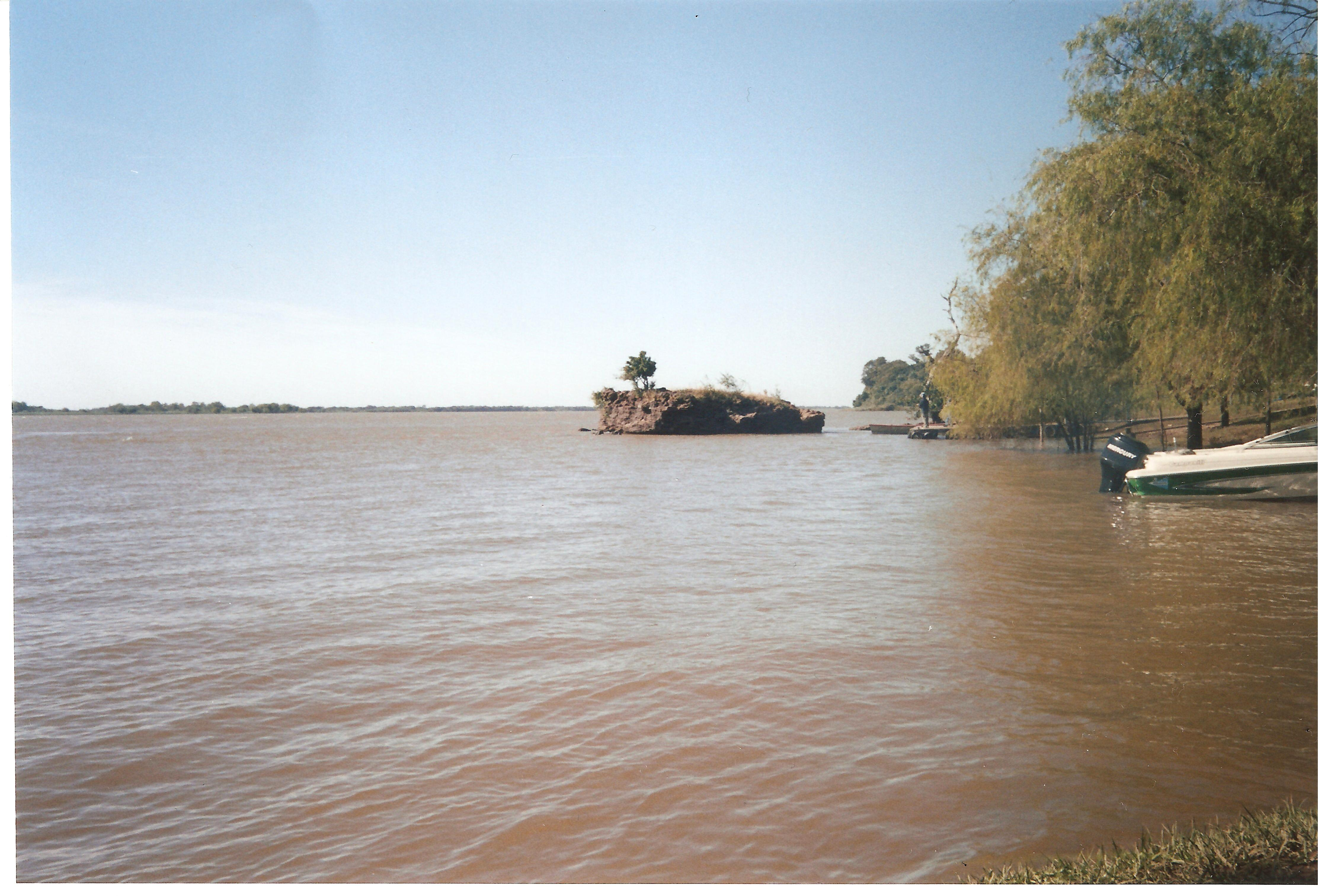
View of the Paraná River from the bank at Itatí.

The origin of Itatí was a reduction (indigenous town) established on 7 December 1615 by Franciscan friar Luis de Bolaños, with the name of Pura y Limpia Concepción de Nuestra Señora de Itatí. The proper foundation of Itatí as a town was by general Pedro Ferré, on 15 September 1825.

Despite its small size, Itatí is renowned throughout the country due to the massive displays of devotion to the local advocation of the Virgin Mary. The physical center of these is the basilica (built in 1950), which preserves an allegedly miraculous wooden image of the Virgin of Itatí. On her feast day, 16 July, thousands of pilgrims from nearby and faraway regions, and even from neighbouring countries, come to Itatí to venerate the Virgin.

The name Itatí comes from Guaraní, but there is disagreement as to its exact meaning; ita- undoubtedly corresponds to the Guaraní word for "stone" (appearing in a number of other toponyms, such as Itaipu), while the last part could refer to (moro)ti ("white") or tí [tɨ] ("nose").
