= Sonia Rojas Decut =

Argentine politician

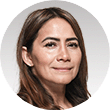

National Senator
- Incumbent
- Assumed office 10 December 2023
- Constituency: Misiones

Provincial Deputy of Misiones
- In office 10 December 2021 – 10 December 2023

Personal details
- Born: 5 August 1973 (age 53)
- Party: Party of Social Concord
- Education: National University of Misiones

Sonia Elizabeth Rojas Decut (born 5 August 1973) is an Argentine teacher and politician affiliated with the Party of Social Concord. She has served as a National Senator for Misiones Province since 2023.

== Early life and career ==
Sonia Elizabeth Rojas Decut was born on 5 August 1973. She earned a degree as a mathematics teacher from the National University of Misiones. Her parents were also educators. She served as principal of the Santa María Institute in Posadas, where she worked for 26 years alongside the Missionary Sisters Servants of the Holy Spirit.

== Political career ==
In 2021, Rojas Decut was elected to the Chamber of Representatives of Misiones as part of the Front for the Renewal of Concord list.

In October 2023, she was elected to the Argentine Senate for Misiones Province in the 2023 legislative election.

In May 2025, Rojas Decut became involved in controversy after he and fellow Misiones senator Carlos Omar Arce unexpectedly voted against the "Clean Record" bill, despite having previously indicated that they would support it. The proposal, which sought to bar candidates with corruption convictions upheld on appeal from running for national office, received 36 votes, one short of the absolute majority required. According to media outlets like La Nación, FRC leader Carlos Rovira ordered the party's senators to oppose the bill at President Javier Milei's request.

== Electoral history ==
Electoral history of Fernando Aldo Salino
Election	Office	List	#	District	Votes			Result	Ref.
Election	Office	List	#	District	Total	%	P.	Result	Ref.
2021	Provincial Deputy	Front for the Renewal of Concord	2	Misiones Province	243,409	46.74%	1st (Note: Presented on an electoral list. The data shown represents the share of the vote the entire party/alliance received in that constituency.)	Elected	
2023	National Senator	Front for the Renewal of Concord	1	Misiones Province	253,428	62.11%	1st	Elected	
