= Mercedes Margarita Oviedo =

Argentine politician (born 1952)

National Senator
- In office 10 December 2001 – 10 December 2005
- Constituency: Misiones

Vice Governor of Misiones
- In office 10 December 1999 – 10 December 2003
- Governor: Carlos Rovira
- Preceded by: Julio Alberto Ifrán
- Succeeded by: Pablo Tschirsch

Personal details
- Born: 29 October 1952 (age 73) El Zapallar, Argentina
- Party: Justicialist Party
- Education: National University of Misiones

Mercedes Margarita Oviedo (born 29 October 1952) is an Argentine politician of the Justicialist Party who served as a National Senator for Misiones from 2001 to 2005, and as Vice Governor of Misiones from 1999 to 2001, under Carlos Rovira.

Born in El Zapallar, Chaco, Oviedo studied to become a teacher at the Escuela Normal Nacional Estados Unidos del Brasil, and later finished a degree on social work from the National University of Misiones. Throughout her political career, she served in a number of positions related to social services in the provincial government (such as heading the social services department of the Provincial Institute for Habitational Development). In 1997, she was elected to the Chamber of Representatives of Misiones on the Justicialist Party list, wherein she served as president of the parliamentary commission on social affairs.

In the 1999 provincial elections, she was the running mate of Carlos Rovira in the Justicialist Party ticket, which won with 53.74% of the vote. Upon taking office, she became the first female vice governor of Misiones and the second female vice governor in Argentina, after Elva Roulet of Buenos Aires Province. In the 2001 legislative election, Oviedo was elected to the National Senate representing Misiones, alongside Ramón Puerta. In the Senate, she served as president of the parliamentary commission on social action and public health. In 2005, after the end of her term as senator, she was once again elected to the Chamber of Representatives of Misiones, serving until 2009.

She was married to Julio Alberto Ifrán, a fellow Justicialist Party politician who served as Vice Governor of Misiones before her, although they later divorced.

Political offices
| Preceded by Julio Alberto Ifrán | Vice Governor of Misiones; 1999–2001 | Succeeded by Pablo Tschirsch |
