= Sandra Giménez =

Argentine politician

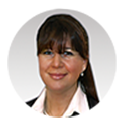

National Senator
- In office 10 December 2011 – 9 December 2017
- Constituency: Misiones

Vice Governor of Misiones
- In office 10 December 2007 – 10 December 2011
- Governor: Maurice Closs
- Preceded by: Pablo Tschirsch
- Succeeded by: Hugo Passalacqua

Provincial Deputy of Misiones
- In office 10 December 2003 – 10 December 2007

Personal details
- Born: 2 September 1967 (age 57); Jardín América, Argentina
- Political party: Front for the Renewal of Concord; Justicialist Party
- Spouse: Germán Bezus

Sandra Daniela Giménez (born 2 September 1967) is an Argentine politician who served as a National Senator for Misioness from 10 December 2011 to 9 December 2017, as Vice Governor of Misiones from 2007 to 2011, under Maurice Closs. Born in Jardín América, Giménez studied medicine in Corrientes, graduating from the National University of the Northeast (UNNE) with specializations in surgery and pediatrics in 1991 and 1996, respectively. She had chosen to study medicine in memory of her brother, who had died at age 11. After graduating, she worked as a medical auditor for the Government of Misiones Province. Through the rest of the 1990s, she served as the Provincial Public Hospital of Pediatrics Executive Director, and in 2003 she was elected to the Chamber of Representatives of Misiones as a member of the Front for the Renewal of Concord party, serving until 2007.

After her term in the Chamber ended in 2007, Giménez was named Vice Governor of Misiones Province, and worked under Governor Maurice Closs for the next four years. She then ran for the Argentine Senate, winning the election and serving a six-year term. She was originally a part of the Justicialist Party, but broke off soon afterwards and was an independent during her term. In the Senate, she served on the Health Commission as its Vice President.
