= Carlos Arce (politician) =

Argentine surgeon and politician

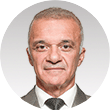

National Senator
- Incumbent
- Assumed office 10 December 2023
- Constituency: Misiones

Vice Governor of Misiones
- In office 10 December 2019 – 10 December 2023
- Governor: Oscar Herrera Ahuad
- Preceded by: Oscar Herrera Ahuad
- Succeeded by: Lucas Romero Spinelli

Personal details
- Born: Carlos Omar Arce; 27 October 1959 (age 67) Posadas, Misiones, Argentina
- Party: Party of Social Concord
- Education: National University of the Northeast

Carlos Omar Arce (born 27 October 1959) is an Argentine politician and surgeon. He has served as a National Senator since 2023, representing Misiones Province for the Party of Social Concord.

== Early life and career ==
Born in Posadas in 1959, Arce completed his military service in the General San Martín Regiment of Mounted Grenadiers. He studied at the National University of the Northeast, where he earned a medical degree and qualified as a surgeon.

== Political career ==
In the 2019 provincial election, Arce was elected as vice-governor of Misiones Province in the ticket headed by Oscar Herrera Ahuad.

In 2023, while serving as vice governor of Misiones Province, Arce was elected to the Argentine Senate for the 2024–2029 term as a member of the Front for Social Concord (FRC) bloc.

In May 2025, Arce became involved in controversy after he and fellow Misiones senator Sonia Rojas Decut unexpectedly voted against the "Clean Record" bill, despite having previously indicated that they would support it. The proposal, which sought to bar candidates with corruption convictions upheld on appeal from running for national office, received 36 votes, one short of the absolute majority required. According to media outlets like La Nación, FRC leader Carlos Rovira ordered the party's senators to oppose the bill at President Javier Milei's request.

== Electoral history ==
Electoral history of Fernando Aldo Salino
Election	Office	List	#	District	Votes			Result	Ref.
Election	Office	List	#	District	Total	%	P.	Result	Ref.
2023	National Senator	Front for the Renewal of Concord	1	Misiones Province	253,428	62.11%	1st (Note: Presented on an electoral list. The data shown represents the share of the vote the entire party/alliance received in that constituency.)	Elected	

Political offices
Preceded by Oscar Herrera Ahuad	Vice Governor of Misiones; 2019–2023	Succeeded by Lucas Romero Spinelli
