= Oberá =

- City
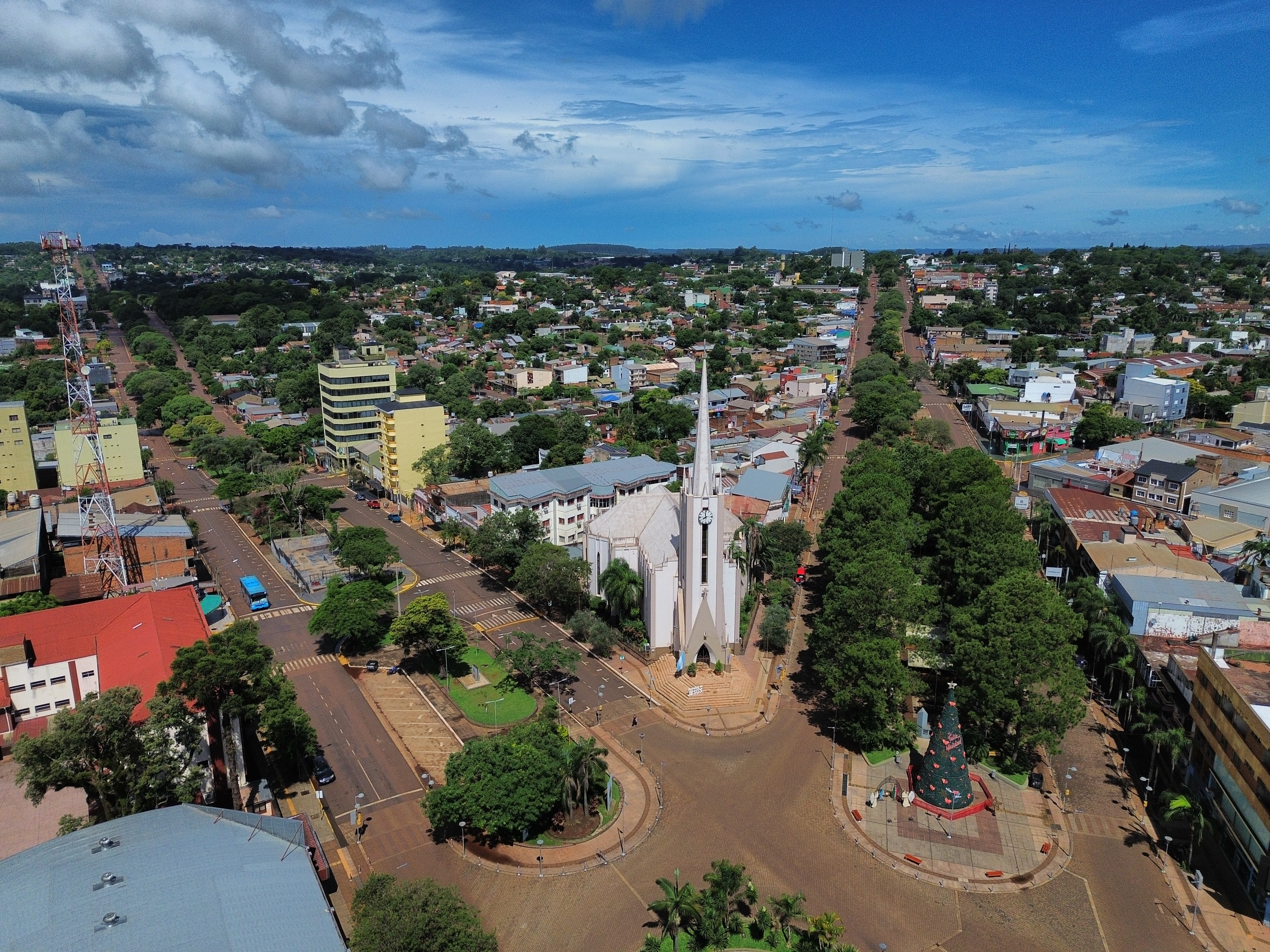
- Aerial view of downtown Oberá

- Flag

- Location of Oberá in Misiones Province and Argentina Oberá (Argentina)
- Coordinates: 27°29′S 55°8′W
- Country: Argentina
- Province: Misiones
- Department: Oberá

Government
  - Intendant: Pablo Alberto Hassan

Area
  - Total: 155 km^{2} (60 sq mi)
- Elevation: 298 m (978 ft)

Population (2010 census)
  - Total: 63,960
  - Density: 413/km^{2} (1,070/sq mi)
- Time zone: UTC−3 (ART)
- CPA base: N3360
- Dialing code: +54 3755
- Website: Official website

Oberá, formerly Svea, is a city in the interfluvial province of Misiones, Argentina, and the head town of the Oberá Department. It is located 96 km east of the provincial capital Posadas, on National Route 14, and about 1,150 km north of Buenos Aires. It has 63,960 inhabitants according to the 2010 census [INDEC].

== Overview ==
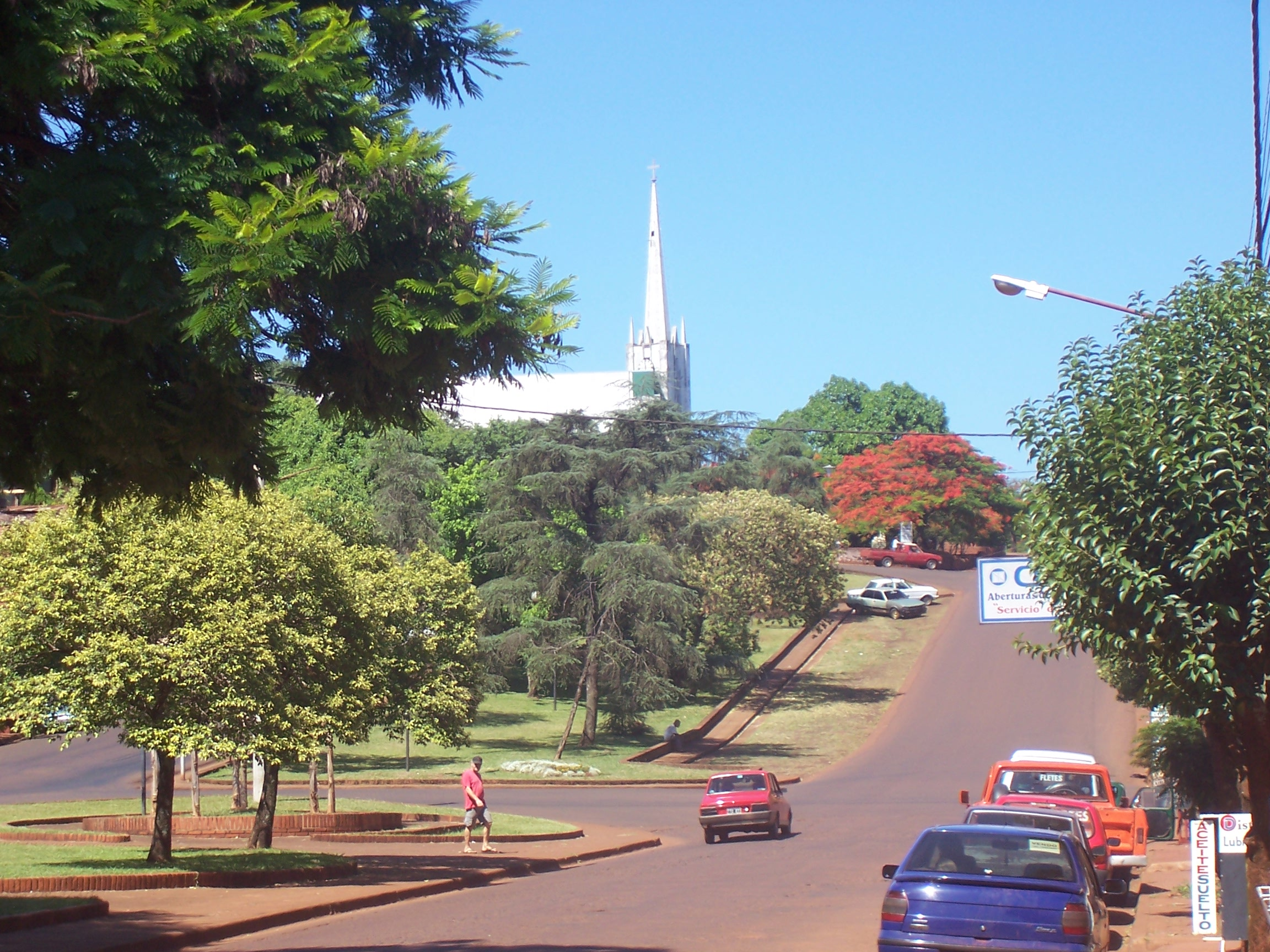
Sarmiento Avenue.

Oberá is the second city in size and importance of the province, and the core of the Sierras Centrales region. The area is a colorful landscape, with luxurious vegetation, streams, cascades and hilly areas. Oberá is also the educational and cultural capital of the central region of the province, with availability of universities and colleges (such as the National University of Misiones). Its economy is based on agriculture and industry.

The local culture is marked by European influences, since the area was settled by numerous colonies of immigrants, starting in 1897.

Oberá is also known as the "City of the Churches", since it features more than 30 churches, belonging to a diversity of denominations (including Eastern and Western Catholic rites, Eastern Orthodox, and several Evangelical/Protestant churches). On June 13, 2009, Oberá was made the see of the newly erected Roman Catholic Diocese of Oberá. The latter was created with territory carved out from the Diocese of Posadas.

== Tourist attractions ==
In addition to the many churches, other tourist sites include:

- Jardín de los Pájaros (Birds' Garden), showcasing more than 200 species of birds.
- Monteaventura, a recreational estate with ecological footpaths and games.
- Salto Berrondo (Berrondo Waterfall), a forest area with camping facilities.
- Reserva del Chachí, a nature reserve near the city, featuring chachís (giant ferns).
- Centro Zootoxicológico, with a diversity of reptiles, including one of the largest serpentaries in the country.
- Oberá Park, a summer recreation center.
- Parque de las Naciones (Park of the Nations), devoted to typical houses of the immigrant communities.
- Historic and Natural Sciences Museum
- Casa de la Cultura' (Culture House), with exhibitions of diverse artists.

Other attractions include visits to small farms and plantations, including those of yerba mate and tea, the major products of Misiones.

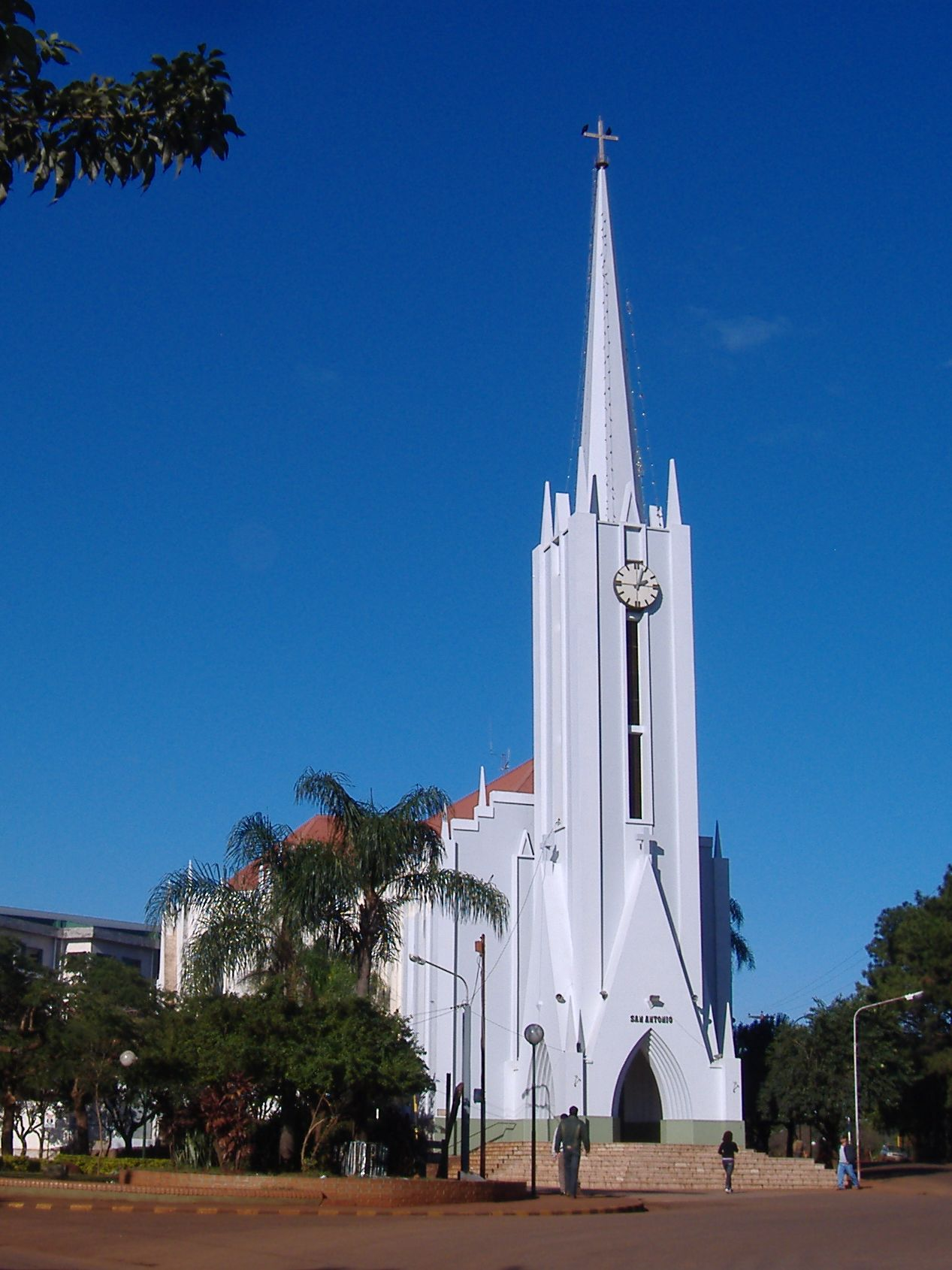
Cathedral of St. Anthony of Padua (Roman Catholic)

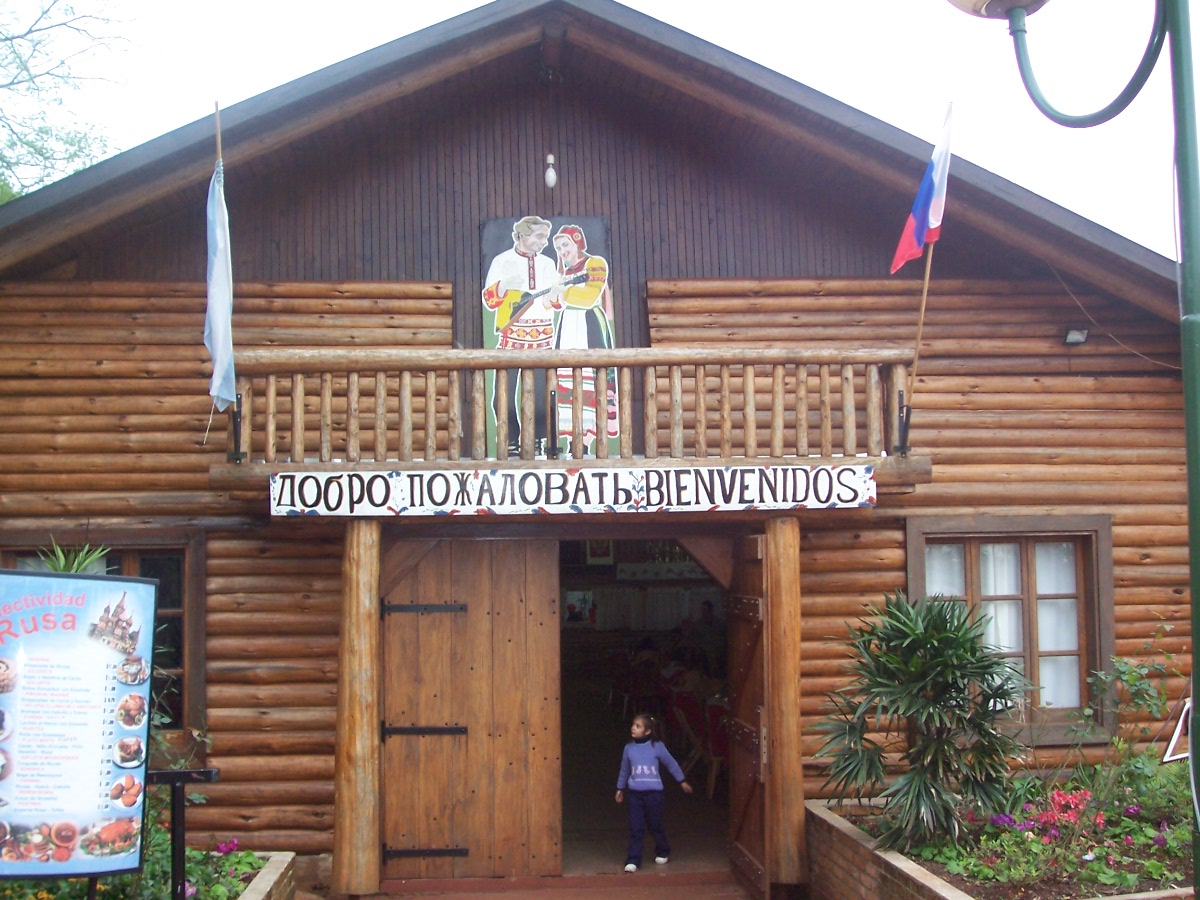
Picture of the Russian House, in the Park of the Nations

== Climate ==
Oberá has a very warm humid subtropical climate (Köppen Cfa) and is alongside Bernardo de Irigoyen the wettest city in Argentina, with an average annual rainfall of around 2,300 millimetres or 90 inches. The climate features hot, oppressive summers and warm winters, with regular spells of heavy rain from the advection of hot tropical air poleward by the western side of the South Atlantic subtropical anticyclone.

Climate data for Oberá (1981–1990, extremes 1961–2016)
Month	Jan	Feb	Mar	Apr	May	Jun	Jul	Aug	Sep	Oct	Nov	Dec	Year
Record high °C (°F)	39.5 (103.1)	39.6 (103.3)	39.4 (102.9)	36.4 (97.5)	33.1 (91.6)	30.0 (86.0)	31.1 (88.0)	34.4 (93.9)	37.0 (98.6)	37.4 (99.3)	40.8 (105.4)	40.7 (105.3)	40.8 (105.4)
Mean daily maximum °C (°F)	32.3 (90.1)	31.1 (88.0)	30.0 (86.0)	26.0 (78.8)	22.8 (73.0)	20.3 (68.5)	21.1 (70.0)	22.7 (72.9)	23.7 (74.7)	27.4 (81.3)	29.4 (84.9)	31.8 (89.2)	26.6 (79.9)
Daily mean °C (°F)	25.4 (77.7)	24.5 (76.1)	23.6 (74.5)	20.2 (68.4)	17.4 (63.3)	14.9 (58.8)	15.2 (59.4)	16.7 (62.1)	17.4 (63.3)	20.8 (69.4)	22.8 (73.0)	24.8 (76.6)	20.3 (68.5)
Mean daily minimum °C (°F)	20.8 (69.4)	20.3 (68.5)	18.9 (66.0)	16.6 (61.9)	13.6 (56.5)	11.1 (52.0)	11.2 (52.2)	12.6 (54.7)	13.1 (55.6)	15.8 (60.4)	18.1 (64.6)	19.9 (67.8)	16.0 (60.8)
Record low °C (°F)	9.9 (49.8)	8.4 (47.1)	5.8 (42.4)	2.4 (36.3)	−0.8 (30.6)	−1.6 (29.1)	−2.8 (27.0)	−2.0 (28.4)	0.8 (33.4)	3.4 (38.1)	3.4 (38.1)	9.0 (48.2)	−2.8 (27.0)
Average rainfall mm (inches)	181.8 (7.16)	215.6 (8.49)	158.6 (6.24)	235.1 (9.26)	252.0 (9.92)	163.9 (6.45)	138.8 (5.46)	175.8 (6.92)	153.7 (6.05)	179.2 (7.06)	217.3 (8.56)	230.6 (9.08)	2,302.4 (90.65)
Average rainy days	12	11	9	11	9	11	10	10	11	10	11	9	124
Average relative humidity (%)	73	76	75	80	79	80	76	75	75	71	71	68	75
Source: Servicio Meteorológico Nacional

== Sports ==
The city is home to the Oberá Tenis Club, a multi-sports club which is especially known for its professional basketball department. The team plays its home games at the Estadio Oberá Tenis Club. Autódromo Ciudad de Oberá is also based in this city.

== History ==
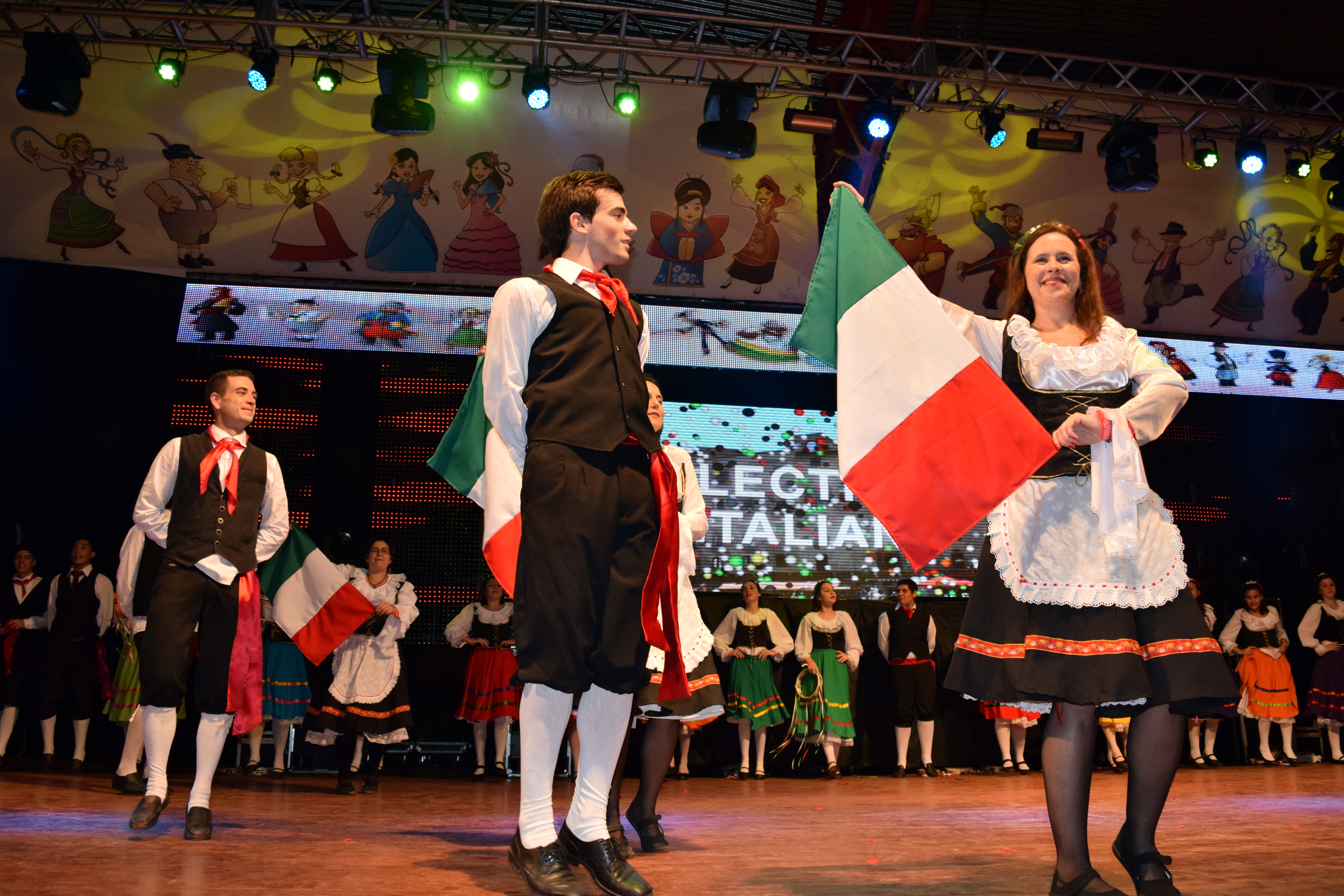
Italian Argentines at the Immigrant's Festival in Oberá.

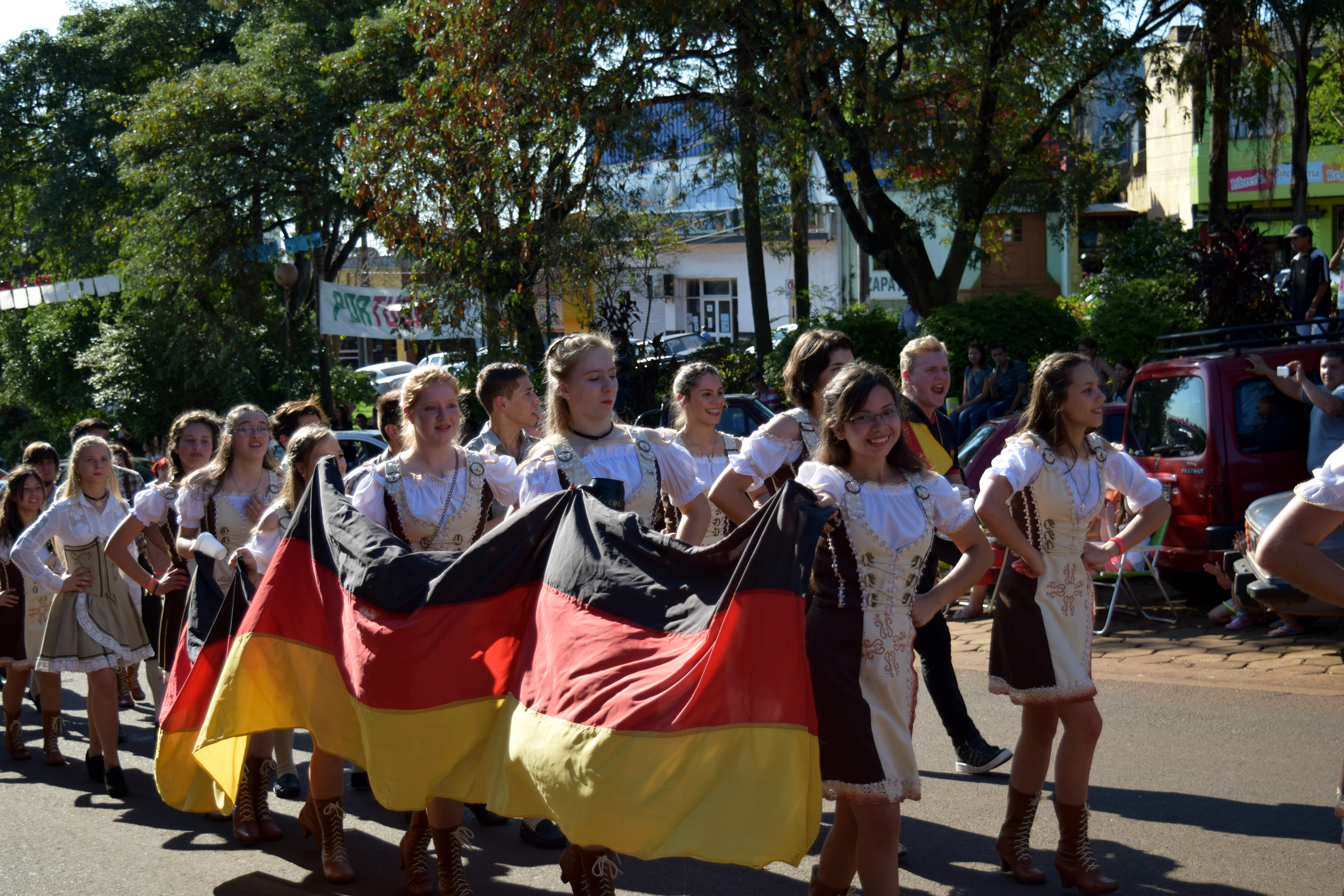
German Argentines at the Immigrant's Festival in Oberá.

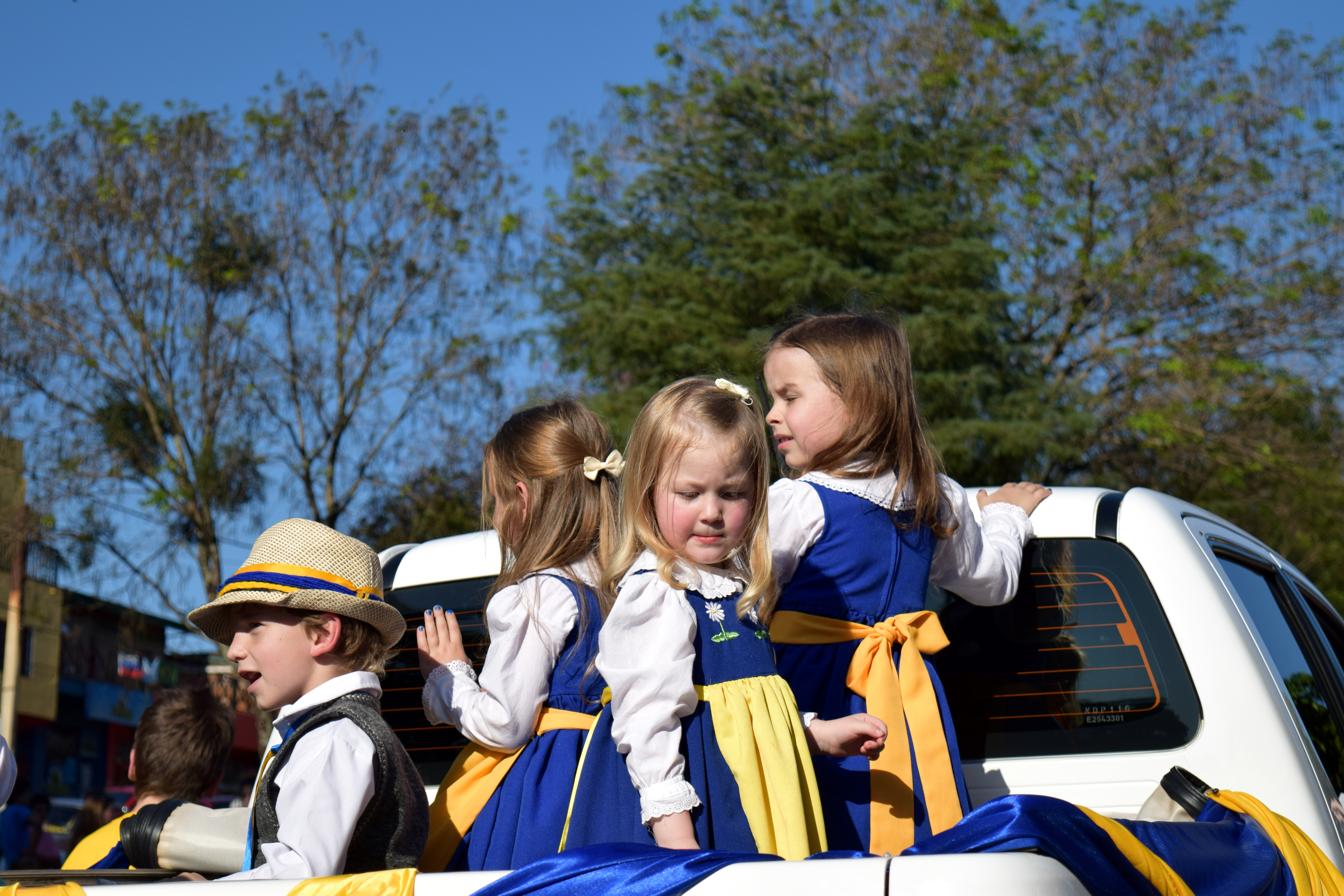
Swedish Argentines children at the Immigrant's Festival in Oberá.

In 1913, a group of immigrants, most of them Swedish, founded it, drawing inspiration for its name from a valkyrie or escudera [female warrior] (mother Svea) belonging to an ancient tradition in the history of Sweden.

The territory where Svea was founded had originally been largely populated by nomadic indigenous peoples, and it belonged to the province of Corrientes until the province of Misiones was federalized in 1891. The province is located in the northeast of Argentina and has very particular geographical features, among which the jungle areas and the Iguazu River stand out. The Iguazu River flows north into the famous Iguazu Falls, which were declared a World Heritage Site and are located about 300 kilometers away from the north of the city of Oberá.

=== Background ===
The colonies founded by immigrants in Misiones were set up between the end of 1890 and at the beginning of the 20th century (Azara and Apóstoles), where Austro-Polish immigrants from Galitzia settled down. These immigrants came through Buenos Aires. In 1907, Bonpland in Misiones was founded by Finnish immigrants (also coming through Buenos Aires) who were granted fiscal lots, after a delegation of that nationality visited the site in 1905.

"In January 1906, a decree promoted agricultural colonization in this area, 50 square leagues between Cerro Corá, Bonpland and properties of Roca and Dávila, giving origin to the colony Yerbal Viejo. Although it was designed for the settlement of the Finns, Swedish families also went there looking for better crop lands, and then immigrants of other nationalities joined them."

In 1910 and 1911, Brazil organized the installation of a settlement plan for Swedish immigrants in Rio Grande do Sul, which subsequently failed due to flooding in 1911. Therefore, many immigrants arriving in the country moved to the south of Misiones. It was that group of Swedes that contributed the most to the founding of Oberá.

=== Founding ===
In 1913, also as a result of the failure of the settlement in Brazil, a group of immigrants, most of them Swedish, began to cross over from Brazil. They crossed the Mato Grosso forest looking for the territory of Misiones in the south. Many of the immigrants died in the attempt.

"My grandfather left Stockholm in 1892 with a group of Swedish people. They were bewildered because it was America and when they arrived in here they were greatly disappointed. They came here from Brazil through what they called the path of death, led by my grandfather, and after traveling many kilometers, without roads or anything, they settled here. They worked hard; they did not even know how to feed themselves. They began to build their houses and to work on the hill, since this area was a virgin forest. They had to start from scratch."

"There was nothing, only forest. Actually, there was something. They had to deal with the forest, the heat, the insects and a lot of deprivation. Sometimes, whole families died. There were no medicines, there was nothing. Besides, no one knew the language. They had to meet and talk to each other: Swedish, Finns and some Norwegians and Danish."

Thus, the fortunate group that managed to make it there, most of them Swedish, were able to settle the site and build the first farms, giving origin to the colony and later the city of Svea. The first families that arrived between 1913 and 1915 were the families of Hermann Kallsten, Aldolfo Lindstrom, and Carlos Pettersson.

Subsequently, more families from other nationalities joined them and the city was created with the name of Svea. Danes, French, Norwegians, and eventually Ukrainians, Finns, Russians, Germans, English, and Lebanese immigrants joined them before and after World War I and World War II.

In 1927, the Argentinian government decided to change the name of the Svea to Oberá, as it is known today. Oberá was officially founded on 9 July 1928. Its name was taken from a renowned aboriginal chief, and it means "bright, shining". More than 15 national/ethnic communities of people descended from immigrants coexist, maintaining their legacy and traditions. On the first fortnight of September every year they celebrate this diversity with the Immigrant's Festival.

== Notable people ==
- Estela Álvarez de Olivera (born 1978), football referee, FIFA-listed
- Eliana Krawczyk (1982–2017), Argentine Navy officer
- Rodolfo Fischer (1944-2020), footballer
- Diego Hartfield (born 1981), stockbroker and tennis player
- Marcos Martínez (born 1977), actor and comedian
- Sebastián Meza (born 2000), footballer
- Mario Noremberg (born 1962), footballer
- Carlos Okulovich (born 1985), car racer
- Hugo Passalacqua (born 1957), former governor of Misiones

== Bibliography ==
- Abínzano, Roberto / Proceso de integración de una sociedad multiétnica: la provincia Argentina de Misiones. El frente extractivo. – s.l.: Universidad de Sevilla, 1985 – Tesis de Doctorado – T. 1 – INV.: 1472G.
- Bartolomé, Leopoldo J. / Colonias y colonizadores en Misiones. – Posadas: UnaM, 1982 – INV.: 1204G.
- Flodell, Gunvor / Misiones svenska : sprakbevarande och sprakpaverkan i en sydamerikansk talgemenskap. – Uppsala: Institutionen for Nordiska Sprak, 1986 – INV.: 324G.
- Gallardo, Carlos R. / Territorio Nacional de Misiones: colonización austro-polaco, su comienzo, desarrollo y situación actual. – Buenos Aires: J. Peuser, 1903 – INV.: 153G, 260G y 1018G.
- Glatz, Markus / Schweizerische einwanderer in Misiones. – Frankfurt: Lang, 1997 – INV: 325G.
- Schiavoni, Angela Perie / La colonización en Misiones: contexto internacional, nacional y sus antecedentes. – Posadas: UnaM, 1985 – INV: 297G.
- Archivo General de la Nación. Archivos de tierras y colonias, CAJAS 2 y 3
- Gori, Gastón. Inmigración y colonización en la Argentina, Buenos Aires, EUDEBA, 4° edición. 1983
- Cortés Conde, Roberto. El progreso argentino, Buenos Aires, Editorial Sudamericana. 1979
- Memorias del Ministerio de Agricultura (Argentina)
- The Immigration, Colección de Arte y Memoria Audiovisual. Jorge Luis Farjat - Graciela Swiderski. Buenos Aires. 1999.
- The Creation (History of Svea) La Creación (Historia de Svea). Audiovisual. Jorge Luis Farjat. 1998.
- Bartolomé, Leopoldo. Colonias y asentamientos en Misiones. Posadas. UNAM. 1982.
