= Candelaria Department =

Candelaria Departamento Candelaria
- Department
- Interactive map of Candelaria
- Country: Argentina
- Seat: Santa Ana

Area
  - Total: 875 km^{2} (338 sq mi)

Population (2022)
  - Total: 35,318
  - Density: 40.4/km^{2} (105/sq mi)

Candelaria is a department of the province of Misiones (Argentina). It contains the cities, towns, and villages of Bonpland, Candelaria, Cerro Corá, Loreto, Mártires, Profundidad, and Santa Ana. It borders the departments of San Ignacio to the east and northeast, Oberá to the far east, Leandro N. Alem to the south and southeast, Capital to the west and southwest, and the Republic of Paraguay to the north, separated by the Paraná River.

The department has an area of 920 km^{2}, equivalent to 3.07% of the total province. Its population is 35,618 inhabitants, according to the 2001 census (INDEC).

== History ==
=== Background ===
King Carlos III of Spain signed on April 2, 1767, in the Royal Palace of El Pardo, the order known as the "Royal Decree," by which the expulsion of the Jesuits from all the domains of the Crown of Spain was dictated.

In compliance with the Royal Order in 1768, Francisco de Paula Bucarelli y Ursúa, who was the governor of the Río de la Plata, would organize a military expedition to expel the Jesuits from the Guarani missions. On June 16 of the same year, they reached the abandoned fortress of San Antonio del Salto Chico on the eastern bank of the Uruguay River, which had been built on October 6, 1757, but abandoned in 1763, restoring it to serve as a base of operations, as a supply depot, and as a detention center for Jesuit priests. On August 5, 1768, the imprisoned priests in the fortress were sent to Buenos Aires to later be deported to Spain.

=== Formation of the Misiones departments during the Peruvian viceroyal period ===
Governor Bucarelli would issue ordinances on August 23, 1768, by which he would assign to the government of Asunción the reductions of Our Lady of Belén, on the Ypané River — founded in 1760 east of present-day Concepción del Paraguay — and those of San Joaquín, on the banks of the Acaray River, and San Estanislao, near the Monday River (both founded in 1747 and 1749 respectively), and with the rest of the territory of the Missions he would divide it between two interim governments, one called Candelaria with its namesake departmental center, awarded to Captain Juan Francisco de la Riva Herrera, and the other named Yapeyú with its headquarters in the town of San Miguel, which would be under the orders of Captain Francisco Bruno de Zavala, who would later be appointed "interim general governor of Misiones" — whose capital would be the town of Candelaria — due to the new ordinances of the same governor of Buenos Aires, dated January 15, 1770. With centralized command under Captain Zavala, three departments were created under the charge of the dragon lieutenants of the Buenos Aires Regiment.

The new governor of Buenos Aires, Juan José de Vértiz y Salcedo, future Viceroy of the Rio de la Plata from 1778, would grant greater administrative independence to the newly formed departments, putting them under deputy governors, thus assuming in Yapeyú, Juan de San Martín, future father of the patriot general José de San Martín, in the year 1775.

=== The large department of Candelaria in the Rio de la Plata viceroyal period ===
As part of the Viceroyalty of the Rio de la Plata, the Royal Ordinance of Intendants of January 28, 1782, created the Government Tenure of the Thirty Towns of the Guarani Missions with greater administrative and religious influence from Asunción in the territory of Candelaria, with the remaining areas under Buenos Aires influence.

The then-large department of Candelaria, which included the current departments of Itapúa in the Republic of Paraguay (except the town of San Cosme), and those of San Ignacio and Capital (in the Argentine Nation), encompassed the town of Candelaria, which was the departmental headquarters and at the same time the capital of the governorship, in addition to the towns of Santa Ana, Loreto, San Ignacio Miní, Corpus, located on the left bank of the Paraná River, and on the right, the towns of Encarnación de Itapúa, Trinidad, and Jesús.

== See also ==
- Mártires, Misiones
