= UNAM (disambiguation) =

The National Autonomous University of Mexico (Universidad Nacional Autónoma de México [UNAM]), is the large public autonomous university, and it is based in Mexico City

UNAM may also refer to:

- National University of Misiones, a National University in Posadas, Argentina
- Pumas UNAM, or UNAM, a soccer club based in Mexico City, better known as Pumas de la UNAM
- University of Namibia, a university in Windhoek, Namibia
  - UNAM F.C., the university's football team
- Unam Sanctam, a bull issued on 18 November 1302 by Pope Boniface VIII
- Art name of Syngman Rhee
