= Leandro N. Alem Department =

Leandro N. Alem Departamento Leandro N. Alem
- Department
- Interactive map of Leandro N. Alem
- Country: Argentina
- Seat: Leandro N. Alem

Area
  - Total: 1,185 km^{2} (458 sq mi)

Population (2022)
  - Total: 49,797
  - Density: 42.02/km^{2} (108.8/sq mi)

Leandro N. Alem is a department of the province of Misiones, Argentina. It borders the departments of Capital, Oberá, Candelaria, Apóstoles, Concepción, and San Javier.

The department covers an area of 1,070 km², equivalent to 3.6% of the total province area. Its population is 45,075 (2010 census, INDEC).
