= Azara, Misiones =

Azara (Misiones)
- Municipality and village
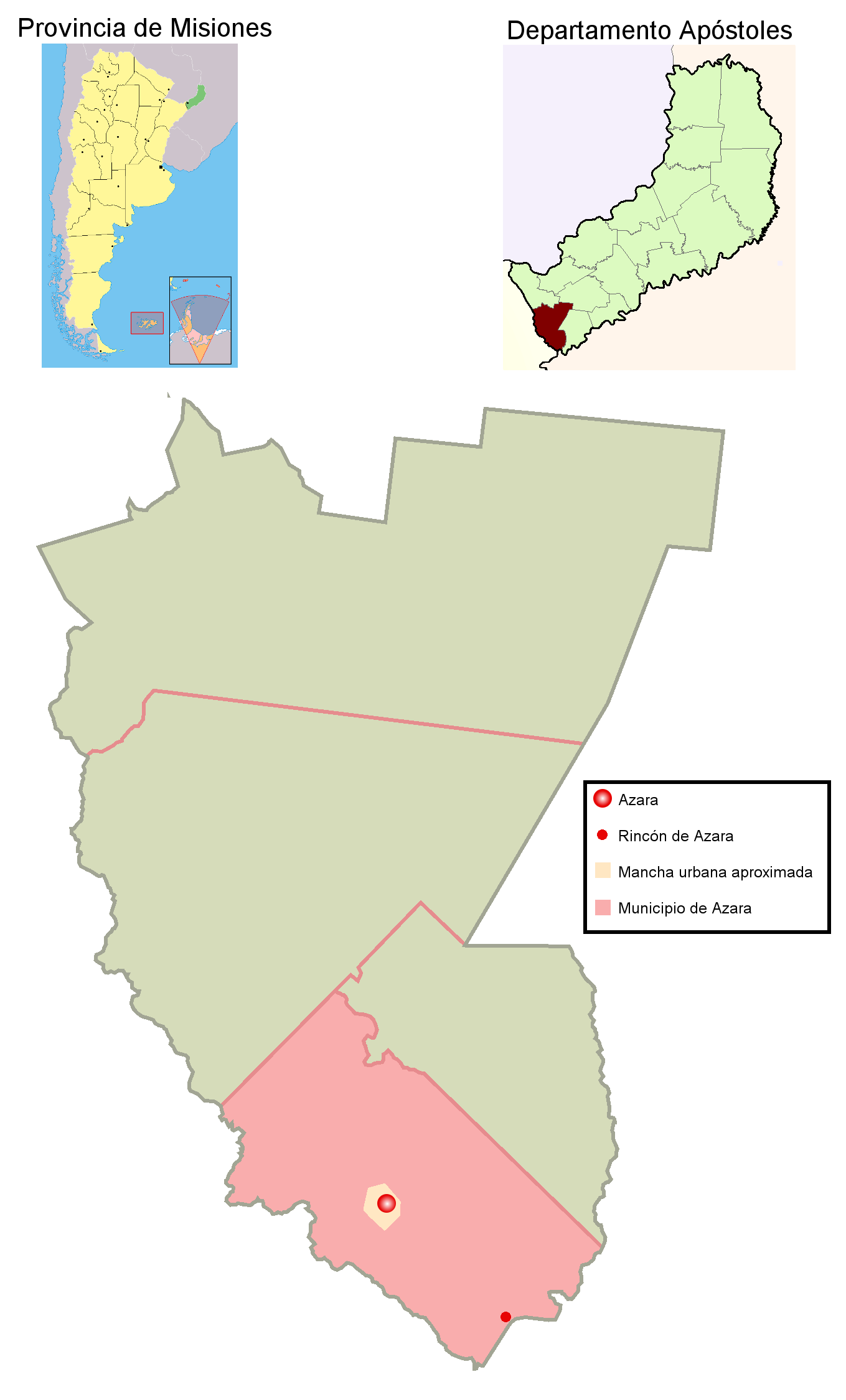
- The municipality and village of Azara in the province of Misiones, the small dot represents the town of Rincón de Azara

- Location within Misiones Province Location within Argentina
- Country: Argentina
- Province: Misiones Province
- Department: Apóstoles
- Established: 21 July 1900

Government
  - Intendant: Dany Yendrika

Area
  - Total: 89 sq mi (230 km^{2})
- Elevation: 266 ft (81 m)

Population (2001)
  - Total: 2,412
  - Density: 39/sq mi (15/km^{2})
- Time zone: UTC−3 (ART)
- Postal code: 3351
- Area code: 3758

Azara is a village and municipality in Misiones Province in north-eastern Argentina. It is considered an agricultural colony, having about 230 km^{2} (23,000 ha). The municipality is located in the Apóstoles department, bordered by the municipalities of Apóstoles and Tres Capones in the same department, by the Sierra de Concepción in the Concepción Department and by the province of Corrientes.

== Population ==
The municipality has a population of 3,484 inhabitants according to the 2001 census (INDEC).

== Toponym ==
Azara was named after the famous Spanish naturalist, geographer and sailor, Felix de Azara, born in 1754, who, as lieutenant of the Marquis de Avilés and Viceroy of Rio de La Plata, visited and studied the Argentine and Paraguay Mesopotamic regions between 1781 and 1801, fifteen years after the expulsion of the Jesuits.

== Geographical characteristics ==
Azara is considered an agricultural colony, having about 230 km^{2} (23,000 ha). It is located in a field and has no rainforest. There are forests "gallery" on the banks of rivers and streams and some hillocks which in Portuguese are often called capones, they are low, not very extensive, groves.

The country area consists of harsh espartillo grasslands, the wetlands and gentle hills have a few more or less steep slopes. As it relates to the pedological soils, they are lateritic (red earth), suitable for livestock, agriculture, gardening, and the production of yerba mate and tea.

== History ==
The site where Azara now occupies was a cattle farm created by the Jesuits (in the seventeenth century) called "puesto" San Antonio dependent on "dairy" from Yapeyú. After the expulsion of the Jesuits the area was sacked by the Paulist Bandeirantes, leaving the Jesuit settlements and dwellings abandoned.

Around 1800 there was an attempt at colonization by José Avilés e Iturbe, Marquis of Avilés, Viceroy, Governor and Captain General of Rio de La Plata and he was assisted by Félix de Azara and Joaquin de Alós. Colonization failed when the viceroy ceased from his duties because of the war between Spain and Portugal.

During the War of the Triple Alliance (1865-1870) troops heading to Trincheras de San José (today Posadas) and Paraguay passed through the area. After the attempt at colonization by José Avilés e Iturbe there was a hundred-year wait before the first inhabitants took root.

=== First inhabitants ===
In 1897 a group of 14 families (120 people) from Galicia, Austria-Hungary (region now divided between Poland and Ukraine), on their way to the United States, had to choose between returning to their rural villages of origin or embarking on another destination for lack of documentation. The Argentine consul in Trieste offered them land to settle in the country and they accepted. Having reached La Plata without prior notice and not understanding their Polish language, an official recognized the language and summoned one Mr. Szelagowski from Buenos Aires that could translate for them and welcome them.

On mentioning the promised land, he communicated with his friend, newly appointed Governor of National Territory of Misiones, to receive them. On terminating the discussions the families embarked on a journey up the Uruguay river to the vicinity of Garruchos. They then went up to Apóstoles where they were received by Governor Lanusse.

=== Life in the early years ===
The beginning was difficult, since the fields were degraded or consisted of scrubland. With limited resources, but animated, supporting each other, they began to build their homes, wiring, plowing and provided themselves with daily sustenance. These lands were part of the farm of one Granné, from Corrientes, which was then passed into the hands of a Mr. Olgin. The early settlers grieved the absence of a priest to live among them. To attend Mass or other spiritual diligence they had to go to Apóstoles, 23 km away. Many made the journey on foot.

These families wrote to their relatives in Europe and in 1901 they reached a quota of 138 families and in 1902 and another quota of 1600 people. Thus began a rapid colonization of Misiones and the creation of village after village as Poles, Ruthenians, Germans, Russians, and other families arrived, attracted by the possibility of owning land to exploit without having to be servants of a ruler.

== First parish priest ==
On October 29, 1903, Father Jose Bayerlein Marianski arrived in Apostles as an aide to parish priest Uladislao Reinke Zakrzewski. This encouraged the construction of a chapel, a nursing school, roads, bridges and social communication medium. Thus, on November 16, 1924, the first newspaper from the Territorio Nacional de Misiones called Oredownik (name of a Polish Solicitor) was published under the direction (until 1931) of Father Marianski and editing and printing by Juan Czajkowski. Between 1931 and 1950 the newspaper, then under the direction of Juan Czajkowski, moved to the city of Posadas where it continued its social and cultural function. This is recounted in the biography of Father Marianski under the title of Un Soldado del Evangelio (A Soldier of the Gospel) written by Juan Czajkowski, his lay associate.

== Communication routes ==
Azara's main access constitutes Provincial Route 1, which connects the north (via asphalt) with the city of Apóstoles and the south (by land) with Rincón de Azara (also known as Puerto Azara), a small village located on the banks of the Uruguay River. Provincial Route 2, by land, connects Azara to the east with Tres Capones and Concepción de la Sierra, and to the southwest with Garruchos and Santo Tomé in the province of Corrientes.

== Bibliography ==
- Juan Czajkowski (1971). Un soldado del evangelio. Posadas, Misiones, Argentina.
- Marta Catalina Marcelina Potocki de Rendiche (2000). Azara. Un lugar de mi patria. Apóstoles, Misiones, Argentina.
- Federico Vogt. (1997). 1897-1922. La colonización polaca en Misiones (The Polish colonization in Misiones). Corrientes, Argentina.
- Guillermo Furlong. (1974). Misiones y sus pueblos de guaraníes. 1610-1813 (Misiones and its Guarani villages). Posadas, Misiones, Argentina.

== See also ==
- Geographic location plus NASA satellite photos or
- San Antonio Parish Church in Azara
