= Oscar Herrera Ahuad =

Argentine politician

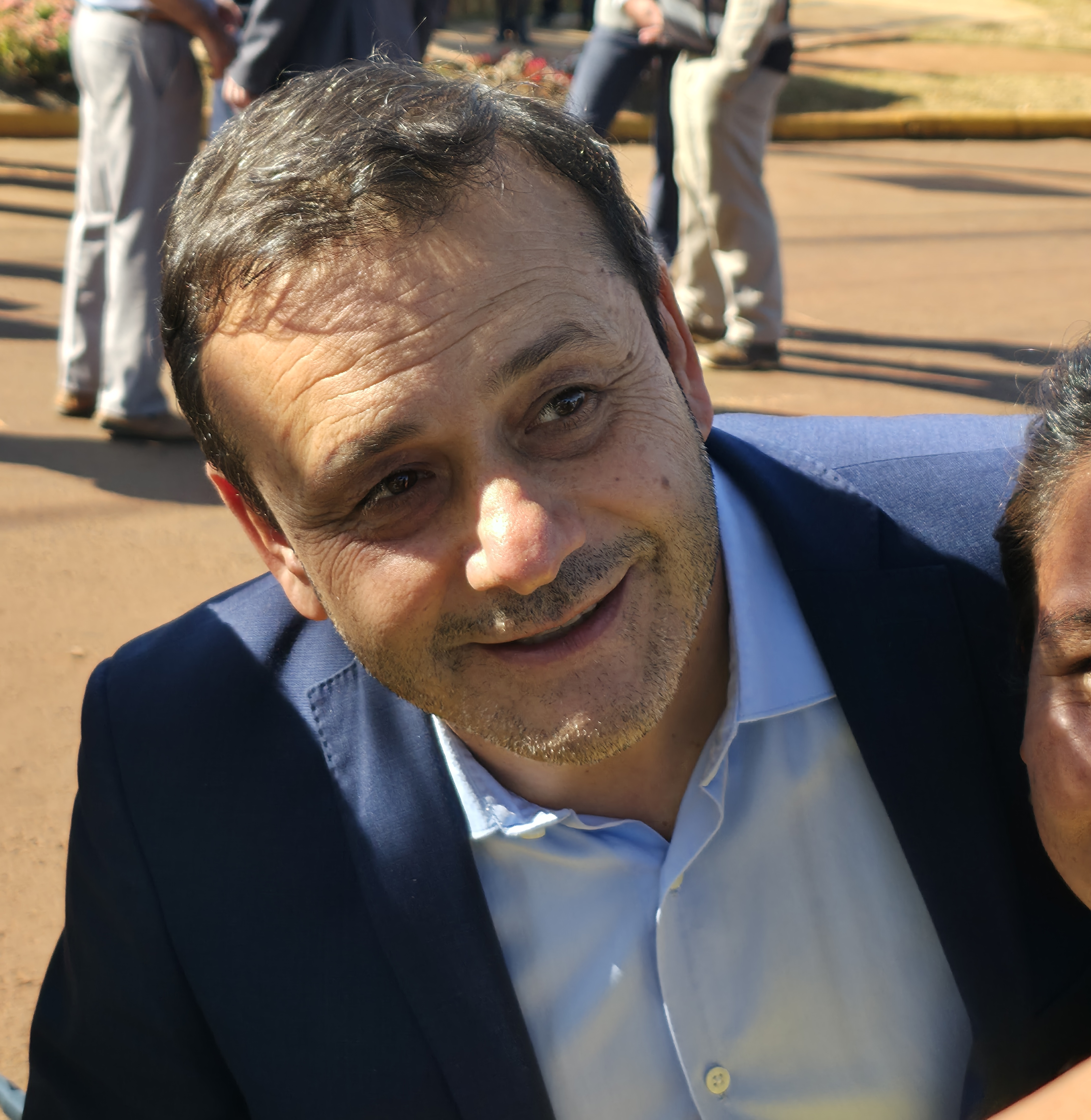

National Deputy
- Incumbent
- Assumed office 10 December 2025

Provincial Deputy of Misiones
- In office 10 December 2023 – 10 December 2025

Governor of Misiones
- In office 10 December 2019 – 10 December 2023
- Vice Governor: Carlos Omar Arce
- Preceded by: Hugo Passalacqua
- Succeeded by: Hugo Passalacqua

Vice Governor of Misiones
- In office 10 December 2015 – 10 December 2019
- Governor: Hugo Passalacqua
- Preceded by: Hugo Passalacqua
- Succeeded by: Carlos Omar Arce

Personal details
- Born: 20 August 1971 (age 55) Quimilí, Santiago del Estero Province, Argentina
- Party: Party of Social Concord
- Education: National University of the Northeast

Oscar Herrera Ahuad (born 20 August 1971) is an Argentine physician and politician who is currently a National Deputy elected in Misiones Province. He previously served as governor of Misiones from 2019 to 2023, and as Vice Governor under Hugo Passalacqua.

From 2023 to 2025 he was a member of the Chamber of Representatives of Misiones. Herrera Ahuad belongs to the Party of Social Concord.

== Early life and education ==
Oscar Herrera Ahuad was born on 20 August 1971 in Quimilí, a small town in Santiago del Estero Province. His parents, Oscar Ramón Herrera and Magdalena Ahuad, were high school teachers. His father was originally from Pampa de los Guanacos, and the family spent some time there after Herrera Ahuad's birth. The family later relocated to Puerto Rico, Misiones. Herrera Ahuad later moved to Corrientes and enrolled at the National University of the Northeast to study medicine.

As a physician, Herrera Ahuad was a resident doctor at the Samic Hospital in Eldorado and at the San Pedro Hospital, of which he was later director. He also served as director of the Zona Noreste medical district.

== Political career ==
Herrera Ahuad's political involvement began, according to him, due to his uncle, who was a candidate to intendente (mayor) of Puerto Rico in several occasions. Herrera Ahuad's was also a mayoral candidate in 2007, though he lost the election. In 2009 he was appointed Undersecretary of Health of the province, in the administration of Maurice Closs. In 2011 he was appointed Minister of Health of the province.

In 2015, Herrera Ahuad ran in the Front for the Renewal of Concord ticket as vice governor candidate alongside Hugo Passalacqua; the ticket won the election and Herrera Ahuad was sworn in as Vice Governor on 10 December 2015.

He ran for the governorship in 2019 and won the election with 72.81% of the vote.

== Personal life ==
Herrera Ahuad is married to Graciela Traid, with whom he has two daughters: Giuliana and Agustina. He is a fan of Club Atlético San Lorenzo.

Political offices
Preceded by Hugo Passalacqua	Vice Governor of Misiones; 2015–2019	Succeeded by Carlos Omar Arce
Preceded by Hugo Passalacqua	Governor of Misiones; 2019–2023	Succeeded by Hugo Passalacqua
