= Apóstoles Department =

Apóstoles Departamento Apóstoles
- Department
- Flag
- Interactive map of Apóstoles
- Coordinates: 27°54′51″S 55°45′18″W
- Country: Argentina
- Seat: Apóstoles

Area
  - Total: 1,068 km^{2} (412 sq mi)

Population (2022)
  - Total: 50,597
  - Density: 47.38/km^{2} (122.7/sq mi)

Apóstoles is a department in the southeast of the province of Misiones, Argentina. Its head is the homonymous locality.

It borders the departments of Capital, Leandro N. Alem, Concepción, with the province of Corrientes, and the Federative Republic of Brazil. The department has an area of 1,035 km², equivalent to 3.48% of the total province. Its population is 51,169 inhabitants, according to the 2022 census (INDEC).

== Education ==
In the town of Apóstoles, there is the rural secondary school mediated by technology, located in the rural neighborhood 3 kilometers from the urban center.
