= Luis María Cassoni =

Argentine politician and pharmacist (1939–2021)

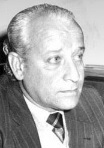

Governor of Misiones
- In office 17 September 1987 – 10 December 1987
- Preceded by: Ricardo Barrios Arrechea
- Succeeded by: Julio César Humada

Personal details
- Born: 8 January 1939; San Javier, Misiones, Argentina
- Died: 17 January 2021 (aged 82); Posadas, Misiones, Argentina
- Political party: Radical Civic Union

Luis María Cassoni (8 January 1939 – 17 January 2021) was an Argentine politician and pharmacist. He belonged to the Radical Civic Union (UCR) and served as Governor of Misiones Province between September and December 1987.

== Biography ==
Born in San Javier, Misiones, Cassoni was elected vice governor of Misiones Province in the October 1983 elections, taking office in December of the same year. He took charge of the provincial executive power after the resignation of the then governor, Ricardo Barrios Arrechea, who left office to form part of the cabinet of President Raúl Alfonsín as Minister of Health and Social Welfare.

Between 1988 and 1991, he served as provincial deputy. During his tenure as vice governor, he oversaw the construction of the Urugua-í dam, for which he later faced accusations of surcharges and irregularities.

== Death ==
Cassoni died from COVID-19 on 17 January 2021, in Posadas, Misiones. The government of Misiones extended condolences for his distinguished career and declared mourning.
