= Ramón Puerta =

Interim President of Argentina in 2001

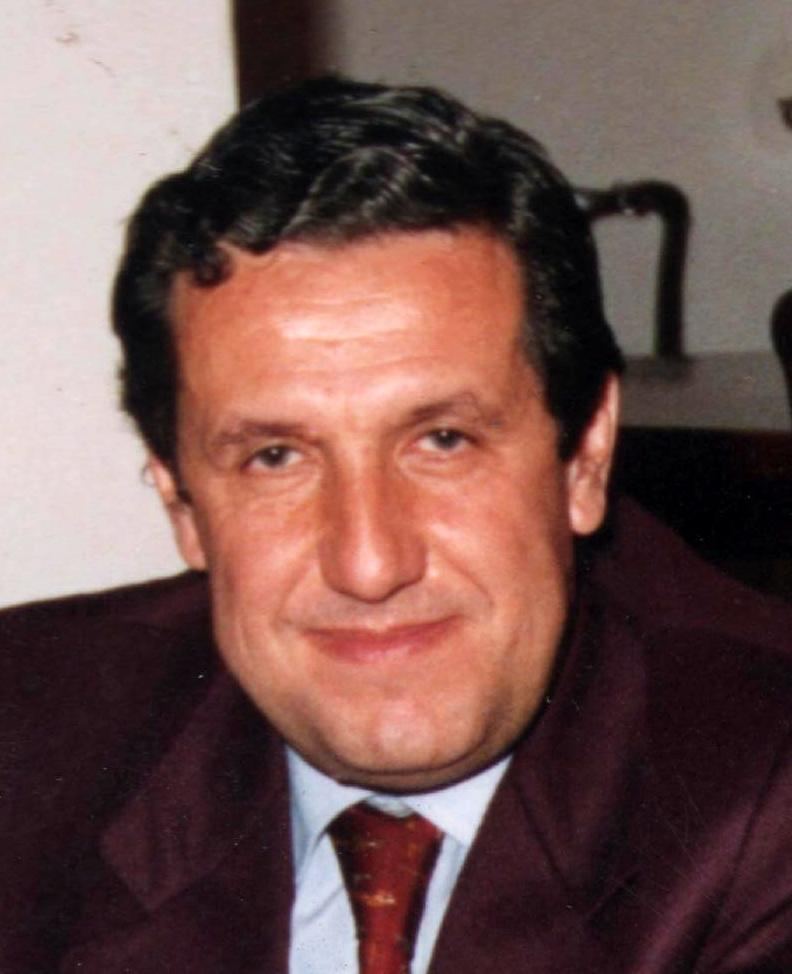

Acting President of Argentina (Note: Provisional President of the Senate in exercise of the Executive Branch)
- In office 21 December 2001 – 23 December 2001
- Vice President: Vacant
- Preceded by: Fernando de la Rúa
- Succeeded by: Adolfo Rodríguez Saá

Provisional President of the Senate
- In office 10 December 2001 – 30 December 2001
- Preceded by: Mario Losada
- Succeeded by: Juan Carlos Maqueda

Ambassador of Argentina to Spain
- In office 8 March 2016 – 10 December 2019
- Nominated by: Mauricio Macri
- Preceded by: Carlos Bettini
- Succeeded by: Ricardo Alfonsín

National Deputy
- In office 10 December 2009 – 10 December 2013
- Constituency: Misiones
- In office 10 December 1999 – 9 December 2001
- Constituency: Misiones
- In office 10 December 1987 – 10 December 1991
- Constituency: Misiones

National Senator
- In office 10 December 2001 – 10 December 2005
- Constituency: Misiones

Governor of Misiones
- In office 10 December 1991 – 9 December 1999
- Vice Governor: Miguel Ángel Alterach (1991–1995); Julio Alberto Ifrán (1995–1999)
- Preceded by: Julio César Humada
- Succeeded by: Carlos Rovira

Personal details
- Born: 9 September 1951 (age 75) Apóstoles, Misiones
- Party: Justicialist Party
- Profession: Pontifical Catholic University of Argentina

Federico Ramón Puerta (Spanish pronunciation: [feðeˈɾiko raˈmom ˈpweɾta]; born 9 September 1951) is an Argentine Peronist politician who has served as a governor, national senator and deputy and briefly as president of Argentina in 2001.

== Biography ==
Puerta was born in Apóstoles, Misiones Province. He attended the Universidad Católica Argentina in Buenos Aires and qualified as a civil engineer. However, he entered the family business of the cultivation of yerba maté, and became a successful businessman and millionaire.

Puerta was elected a national deputy for Misiones in 1987. In 1991, he was elected governor of Misiones Province, re-elected in 1995 and served until 1999. He followed the neo-liberal economic model of President Carlos Menem, including privatising the provincial bank of which his own grandfather had been a founder.

In 1999, he was re-elected to the Chamber of Deputies and in 2001 he was elected to the Senate. In November of that year, he was elected provisory president of the Argentine Senate, constitutionally third in line to the nation's presidency.

Puerta served as the acting head of the executive branch of the country for two days on 21–22 December 2001. He came to that position in his capacity as President Pro Tempore of the Senate and, as there was no vice president, he was next in line to the nation's highest office when President Fernando de la Rúa resigned amid rioting. A week after giving up the presidency, Puerta resigned as leader of the Senate in order to avoid retaking the presidency, following a second institutional crisis.

Puerta stood to be governor of Misiones in 2003, but lost to his successor, Carlos Rovira. He retired from the Senate in 2005. He ran for governor of Misiones again in 2007, and was defeated in the October election, coming in third place with 15% of the vote.

=== Ambassador to Spain ===
In December 2015, President Mauricio Macri appointed him as Argentine ambassador to Spain. His appointment had to be approved by the Senate of the Argentine Nation.

Puerta considers himself a close friend of Macri and has expressed support for Macri's administrations on various occasions.

== Personal life ==
Puerta is unmarried and has two children.

== Controversies ==
In February 2014, the newspaper Página 12 published accusations against Puerta for having slave laborers on his farms. The AFIP carried out a surprise inspection on his farms, where it found nearly one hundred people living in conditions of slavery, residing in small huts with sack roofs while harvesting yerba mate. Puerta stated that it was a "media operation" and denied the accusations. The judiciary considered the evidence valid and proceeded with the investigation.

He was accused of receiving advertising funds from the government of the City of Buenos Aires under Mauricio Macri amid the scandal triggered by the allegations against Fernando Niembro. In the Official Bulletin of the city, Canal 4 of Posadas appears as a beneficiary, whose owner denied receiving advertising funds from the Buenos Aires city government; he stated that the funds were intended for the channel Misiones Cuatro, owned by Puerta.

== Notes ==
| Preceded by Mario Losada | Provisional President of the Senate; 2001 | Succeeded by Juan Carlos Maqueda |
