= Oberá Department =

Oberá Departamento Oberá
- Department

- Flag
- Interactive map of Oberá
- Country: Argentina
- Seat: Oberá

Area
  - Total: 1,620 km^{2} (630 sq mi)

Population (2022)
  - Total: 121,701
  - Density: 75.1/km^{2} (195/sq mi)

Oberá is one of the 17 departments in the province of Misiones, Argentina. Located in the southeast, it borders the San Ignacio department, the Cainguás department, the Veinticinco de Mayo department, the San Javier department, the Leandro N. Alem department, the Candelaria department, and the Federative Republic of Brazil, separated by the Uruguay River. The department covers 1,564 km², which is 5.2% of the total province area.

== Name origin ==
Yerbal Viejo, the first settlement, changed its name in memory of the famous Guarani chief "Oberá" (the one who shines). According to tradition, he was known for his indomitable courage. The department was created on December 26, 1956, and was named Oberá because the city Oberá itself had the largest number of inhabitants.

== Geography ==
The relief features its elevations in the Sierra del Imán (or Itacuará), which serves as a divide for the streams that flow into the Yabebiry and those that head towards the Chico Alférez and Once Vueltas streams. To the north, the highest point is in the so-called Cerros Chapá, reaching 401 meters above sea level, where the Sierra de Misiones begins. The altitude decreases towards the Uruguay River; for example, the town of Panambí (which means butterfly in Guarani) is at 90 meters above sea level.

== Climate ==
The meteorological conditions reflect these differences in altitude in the department. For example, Panambí records an average temperature of 25.7°C in January and 15.2°C in July, with an average annual precipitation of 1,520 millimeters. Meanwhile, the city of Oberá, at 340 meters above sea level, records an average temperature of 24°C in January and 14°C in July, with an average annual precipitation of 1800 millimeters.

== Hydrography ==
Among the streams that originate or flow through the department's territory are those that head towards the Paraná River. For example, the Yabebiry stream (which originates near the city of Oberá) and the sub-tributaries on its right bank: the Grande, Soberbio, and Chapá streams; among the sub-tributaries on the left bank is the Salto stream, which, 10 km from the city of Oberá, forms an attractive waterfall on Mr. Berrondo's fields, hence the name Salto Berrondo, which offers tourist services and infrastructure to visitors.

== Nature ==
Phytogeographically, the department falls within the Misiones Jungle formation, whose line reaches Oberá, from where it heads towards the Uruguay River, and in the transition zone with the "Campo Zone" formation.

== Demographics and culture ==
Its population received massive contributions from immigrants, mostly Europeans, followed by Brazilians (mainly of European and Japanese origin), Paraguayans, Arabs, Japanese, Bolivians, and others. Due to this characteristic, the city of Oberá was declared the National Immigrant Capital, and every September, the traditional National Immigrant Festival is celebrated, where communities showcase their ancestral customs through social practices, clothing, music, dance, food, and typical drinks. Its population is 95,667 inhabitants (2001 census, INDEC).
