= Hugo Passalacqua =

Argentine politician

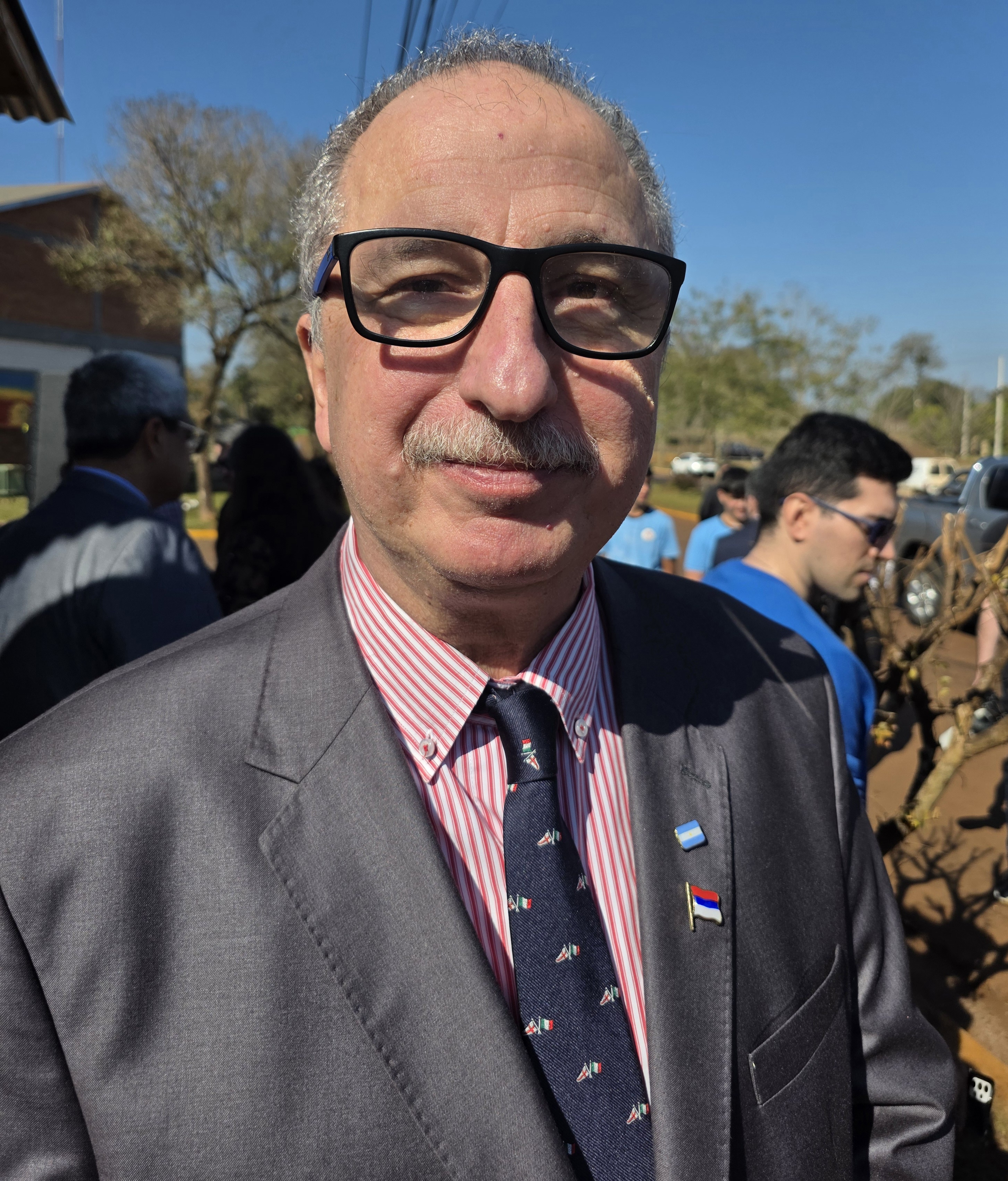
- Passalacqua in 2025

Governor of Misiones
- Incumbent
- Assumed office 10 December 2023
- Vice Governor: Lucas Romero Spinelli
- Preceded by: Oscar Herrera Ahuad
- In office 10 December 2015 – 10 December 2019
- Vice Governor: Oscar Herrera Ahuad
- Preceded by: Maurice Closs
- Succeeded by: Oscar Herrera Ahuad

Provincial Deputy of Misiones
- In office 10 December 2019 – 10 December 2015

Vice Governor of Misiones
- In office 10 December 2011 – 10 December 2015
- Governor: Maurice Closs
- Preceded by: Sandra Giménez
- Succeeded by: Oscar Herrera Ahuad

Personal details
- Born: 20 November 1957 (age 68) Oberá, Argentina
- Party: Party of Social Concord
- Education: Universidad del Salvador

Hugo Passalacqua (born 20 November 1957) is an Argentine politician. He served as vice governor of Misiones Province from 2011 to 2015, under Governor Maurice Closs, and served as Governor of Misiones Province from 10 December 2015 to 10 December 2019.

Political offices
Preceded by Maurice Closs	Governor of Misiones; 2015–2019	Succeeded by Oscar Herrera Ahuad
Preceded by Oscar Herrera Ahuad	Governor of Misiones; 2023–present	Incumbent
