= Chango Spasiuk =

Argentine musician

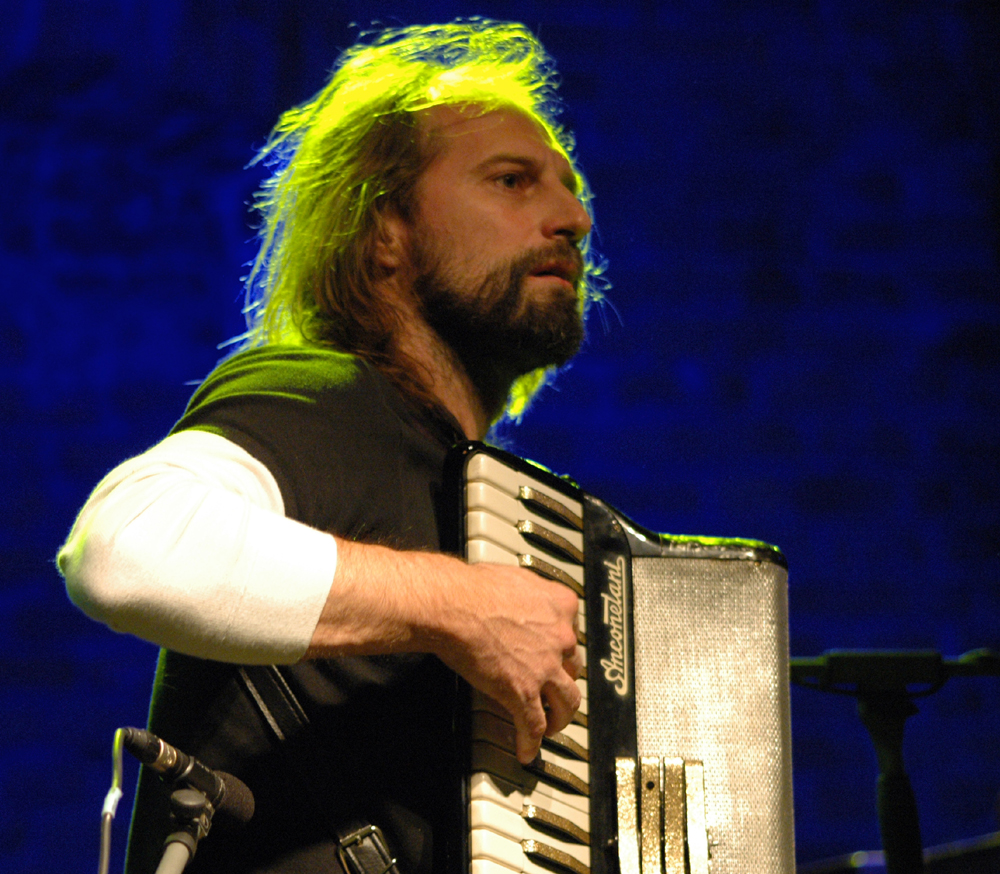
Chango Spasiuk in concert in Warsaw in March 2009.

Horacio "Chango" Spasiuk (born September 23, 1968 in Apóstoles, Misiones) is an Argentine chamamé musician and accordion player.

Spasiuk's grandparents are Ukrainian, and he had a strong Polka music influence from his early days. Eastern European musical influences were also already present in the chamamé music of the region. He had his first accordion at age 12, which he played at parties, weddings and other events with his father and uncle.

== Early years ==
A musical-talent TV show that travelled around small towns opened the door for Spasiuk to perform at provincial festivals. When he finished high school, he went to Posadas, the capital of Misiones, to study anthropology, but soon after he dropped out. Nevertheless, there he was exposed to other musical genres, and met pianist Norberto Ramos, who convinced him to go to Buenos Aires to study with him. Spasiuk then played in small places in Buenos Aires as well as in some festivals around the country, and even received an invitation to participate in the Eurolatina festival in the Netherlands.

In 1989 Spasiuk was invited to play in Cosquín, perhaps the most important folkloric music festival in Argentina, where he received the "Consecration" prize. After Cosquín he moved to Buenos Aires, where he recorded his first album, eponymously named Chango Spasiuk.

Spasiuk gained some popularity among folk and world music audiences and, given his modern style, with rock and pop fans. He worked as a guest musician with bands like Divididos and Cienfuegos, but continued recording his own material. Favourable reviews of the "La Ponzoña" album reached Canada, and Spasiuk was invited to play at the Montreal International Jazz Festival.

In 2000 he returned to his roots recording Polcas de mi tierra live at parties and weddings in the small towns of Misiones with his accordion. Since then he has been touring around the world with the Chango Spasiuk Orchestra, and has edited an international recompilation of his work in 2003.

Spasiuk has been championed in Europe by world music journalists, for many of whom chamamé is a previously unknown form of music. The late BBC radio presenter Charlie Gillett was a prominent fan in the United Kingdom and included Spasiuk's tracks on his compilations and playlists .

== Awards ==
- 2006 named Best Folklore Artist, by the Carlos Gardel awards, for his work Tarefero de mis Pagos
- 2006 Tarefero de mis Pagos nominated for Best Folk Album by the 7th Annual Latin Grammy Awards
- 2005 received the Konex Award for best Argentine male Folklore singer of the decade
- 2005 winner of the Newcomer BBC World Music Awards
- 2001 nominated for Best Folklore Artist, by the Carlos Gardel awards, for his work "Chamamé crudo".
- 2000 Chamamé crudo was named Best Folklore Record of the Year by Rolling Stone-Argentina.
- 2000 named Best Folklore Artist, by the Carlos Gardel awards, for his work Polcas de mi tierra.
- 1999 Polcas de mi tierra named Folklore Record of the Year, by Clarín.
- 1997 La Ponzoña awarded as Best Instrumental Record - Asociación de Cronistas del Espectáculo (ACE).
- 1993 Bailemos y... nominated for Best Instrumental Record - Asociación de Cronistas del Espectáculo (ACE).
- 1989 "Premio Consagración" - Festival Nacional de Folklore, Cosquín, Córdoba.

== Discography ==
- Chango Spasiuk (1989)
- Contrastes (1990)
- Bailemos y... (1992)
- La ponzoña (1996)
- Polcas de mi tierra (1999)
- Chamamé crudo (2001)
- The Charm of chamamé (2003 recompilation, Germany)
- Tareferos de mis Pagos (2004)
- Pynandi - Los Descalzos (2008)
- El Chango: The Very Best Of [2-Disc] (2010)
