= Governor of Misiones Province =

- Provincial coat of Arms

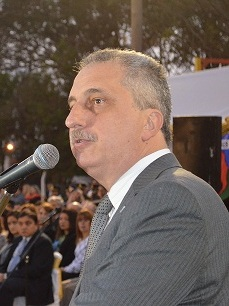
- Incumbent; Hugo Passalacqua since 10 December 2023
- Appointer: Direct popular vote
- Term length: 4 years
- Inaugural holder: Rudecindo Roca

The Governor of Misiones Province (Spanish: Gobernador de la Provincia de Misiones) is the chief executive of Misiones, one of the federal Provinces of Argentina. This office is elected by the popular vote of the province for term of four years. Since 10 December 2023, the governor has been Hugo Passalacqua of the Party of Social Concord.

== Governors since 1983 ==
Governor	Term in office	Party	Election	Vice Governor
Ricardo Barrios Arrechea	10 December 1983 – 17 September 1987	UCR	1983	Luis María Cassoni
Luis María Cassoni	17 September 1987 – 10 December 1987	UCR	1983	Vacant
Julio César Humada	10 December 1987 – 10 December 1991	PJ	1987	Julio Piró
Ramón Puerta	10 December 1991 – 10 December 1999	PJ	1991	Miguel Ángel Alterach
Ramón Puerta	10 December 1991 – 10 December 1999	PJ	1995	Julio Alberto Ifrán
Carlos Rovira	10 December 1999 – 10 December 2007	PJ	1999	Mercedes Margarita Oviedo
Carlos Rovira	10 December 1999 – 10 December 2007	PCS	2003	Pablo Tschirsch
Maurice Closs	10 December 2007 – 10 December 2015	PCS	2007	Sandra Giménez
Maurice Closs	10 December 2007 – 10 December 2015	PCS	2011	Hugo Passalacqua
Hugo Passalacqua	10 December 2015 – 10 December 2019	PCS	2015	Oscar Herrera Ahuad
Oscar Herrera Ahuad	10 December 2019 – 10 December 2023	PCS	2019	Carlos Omar Arce
Hugo Passalacqua	10 December 2023 – Incumbent	PCS	2023	Lucas Romero Spinelli

== See also ==
- Chamber of Representatives of Misiones
