= Capital Department, Misiones =

Capital Departamento Capital
- Department
- Location within Argentina
- Country: Argentina
- Province: Misiones
- Seat: Posadas

Area
  - Total: 965 km^{2} (373 sq mi)

Population (2022)
  - Total: 392,919
  - Density: 407/km^{2} (1,050/sq mi)

Capital Department is located in the southwestern tip of the Province of Misiones, Argentina.

It borders the departments of Candelaria, Leandro N. Alem, and Apóstoles, as well as the province of Corrientes and the Republic of Paraguay, separated by the Paraná River.

It has an area of 932 km², equivalent to 3.13% of the total province area. Its population was 324,756 inhabitants, according to the 2010 census (INDEC).

== Name origin ==
It has been named Capital since 1895, when, for administrative reasons, the National Territory of Misiones was divided into 14 departments by decree. Due to infrastructure, location, and population related reasons, the city of Posadas (ceded by Corrientes) became the capital.

== Geography ==
The department is located on the South's peneplain, a gently undulating relief, with isolated hills of few slopes that separate the streams' courses.

To the south, the altitude increases significantly due to the proximity of the Sierra de San José, Cerro Galarza, reaching 230 meters in elevation.

== Climate ==
The climatic conditions are typical of the tropics, with no dry season. The city of Posadas has an average annual temperature of 21°C, with a thermal amplitude of 10°C; the average annual precipitation is 3000 millimeters, with an annual average of 150 rainy days.

== Hydrography ==
The collecting streams that run through the department generally flow from south to north and drain into the Paraná River. The Garupá stream, which constitutes the interdepartmental boundary, receives contributions from the Pindapoy Chico and Negro streams on its left bank in its last stretch. The Zaimán stream, which receives the Estepa stream, in its final stretch crosses the southern urban area of Posadas, with its waters being highly polluted.

The Mártires stream, which constitutes the natural boundary of the extension of the city of Posadas to the west, also presents a high degree of pollution in its lower course. Other streams cross its territory include the Vicario and Divisa streams. Finally, the Itaembé stream constitutes the interprovincial boundary with Corrientes.

== Informal settlements ==
In the first semester of 2013, according to the definition used by the civil society organization TECHO, there were 72 informal settlements in the Capital Department of Misiones. It is estimated that approximately 15,800 families live in them.

There is a disparity in the number of families living in each informal settlement, ranging from 10 families in the Sauuer neighborhood of Garupá to 1600 families in the Chacra 181 neighborhood of Posadas, according to estimates from local leaders. The median is 135 families
