= Sebastián Meza =

Argentine professional footballer

Personal information
- Full name: Sebastián Tomás Meza
- Date of birth: 14 March 2000 (age 26)
- Place of birth: Oberá, Argentina
- Height: 1.85 m (6 ft 1 in)
- Position: Goalkeeper

Team information
- Current team: Huracán
- Number: 32

Youth career
- Ex Alumnos Escuela 185 de Oberá
- 2018–2021: Huracán

Senior career*
Years	Team	Apps	(Gls)
2020–	Huracán	22	(0)
2022–2023	→ Sarmiento (loan)	48	(0)
- * Club domestic league appearances and goals as of 17:43, 6 July 2026 (UTC)

Sebastián Tomás Meza (born 14 March 2000) is an Argentine professional footballer who plays as a goalkeeper for Huracán.

== Career ==
=== Huracán ===
Meza joined Huracán in 2018, having previously played for his hometown team Ex Alumnos Escuela N°185. On 6 March 2020, Meza signed his first professional contract through June 2023. His unofficial debut came in early October in a friendly against Talleres. In the succeeding months, Meza was selected on the bench for four Copa de la Liga Profesional matches. Meza extended his contract with Huracán through the end of 2024 in December 2020. After again going unused for a Copa Argentina tie with Estudiantes on 25 February 2021, Meza made his senior debut on 1 March in a Copa de la Liga abandoned encounter with Atlético Tucumán; he was selected to start by Israel Damonte after first-choice Facundo Cambeses suffered a hand injury.

==== Loan to Sarmiento ====
On 30 May 2022, Meza joined Sarmiento on loan until June 2023 with a purchase option.

=== Return to Huracán ===
In April 2024, Meza extended his contract through the end of the 2026 season. In March 2025, Meza again extended his contract with Huracán, this time through the end of the 2027 season.

== Personal life ==
On 3 February 2021, it was revealed that Meza - along with eleven Huracán teammates - had tested positive for COVID-19 amid the pandemic.

== Career statistics ==
As of 24 March 2021.

Appearances and goals by club, season and competition
Club	Season	League			Cup		League Cup		Continental		Other		Total	
Club	Season	Division	Apps	Goals	Apps	Goals	Apps	Goals	Apps	Goals	Apps	Goals	Apps	Goals
Huracán	2020–21 (Note: Soccerway counts 2020 Copa de la Liga Profesional appearances as league appearances.)	Primera División	0	0	0	0	0	0	0	0	0	0	0	0
Huracán	2021 (Note: Soccerway counts 2021 Copa de la Liga Profesional appearances as league appearances.)	Primera División	4	0	0	0	—		—		0	0	4	0
Career total			4	0	0	0	0	0	0	0	0	0	4	0
