= Maurice Closs =

Argentine politician (born 1971)

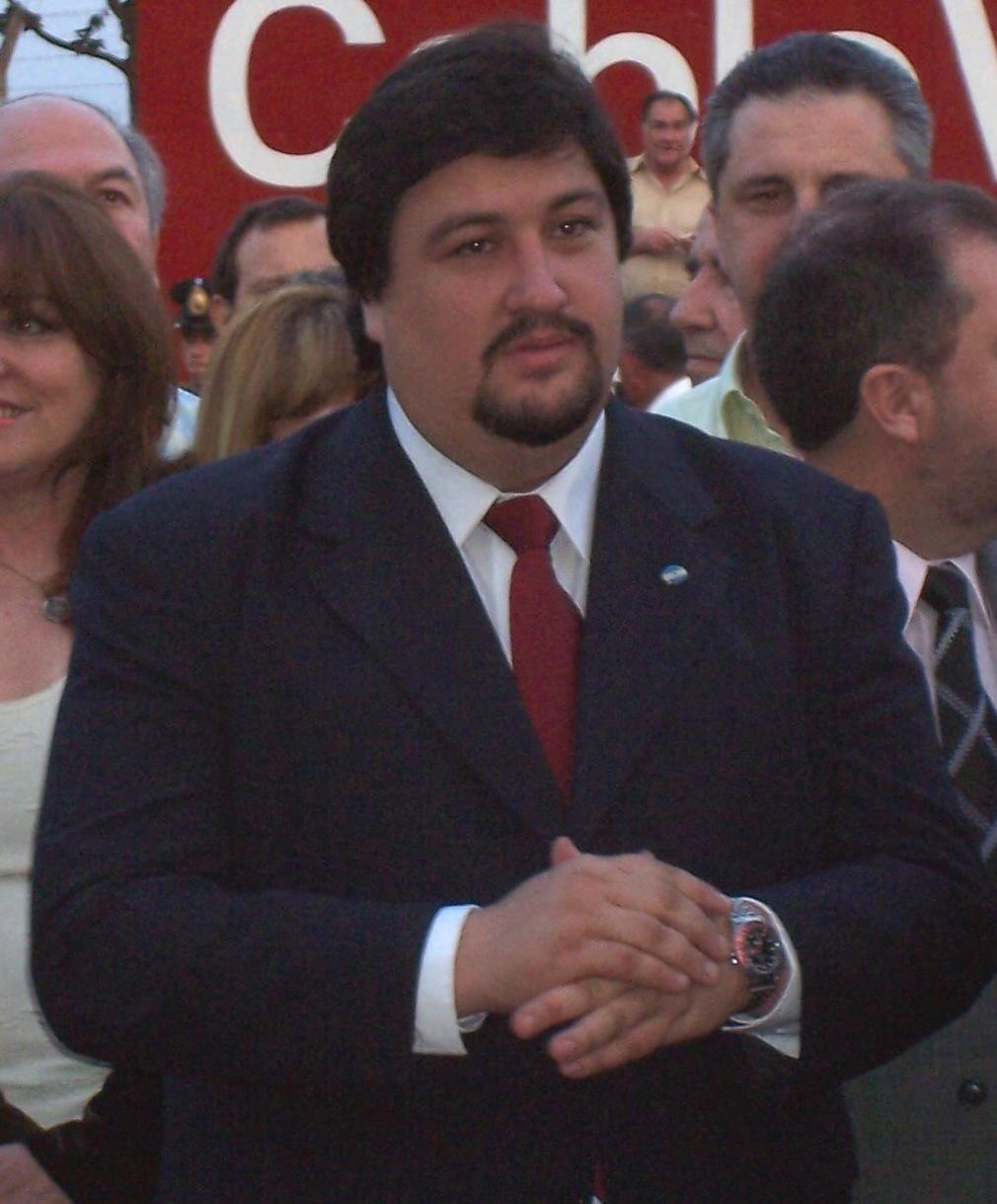

National Senator
- Incumbent
- Assumed office 10 December 2017
- Constituency: Misiones
- In office 10 December 2005 – 9 December 2007
- Succeeded by: Eduardo Torres
- Constituency: Misiones

Governor of Misiones
- In office 10 December 2007 – 10 December 2015
- Vice Governor: Sandra Giménez; Hugo Passalacqua
- Preceded by: Carlos Rovira
- Succeeded by: Hugo Passalacqua

Personal details
- Born: 10 June 1971 (age 54) Aristóbulo del Valle, Misiones, Argentina
- Party: Front for the Renewal of Concord
- Profession: Lawyer

Maurice Fabián 'Mauri' Closs (born 10 June 1971) is an Argentine politician, formerly of the Radical Civic Union (UCR) but now leading the Front for the Renewal of Concord, allied to the Front for Victory in support of President Cristina Fernández de Kirchner. He is a National Senator representing Misiones Province, which he led as governor from 2007 to 2015.

Born in Aristóbulo del Valle, Misiones, Closs graduated as a lawyer from the National University of the Northeast, and studied at postgraduate level at the National University of Misiones. He worked in the family business and studied further at California State University, Los Angeles in Los Angeles and at the United Nations Economic Commission for Latin America and the Caribbean in Chile.

Between 1996 and 2000, Closs headed the Radical Youth movement and in 2002 he was elected president of the Misiones national committee of the UCR. In 2003, Closs and most of his fellow Misiones Radicals joined the Front for the Renewal of Concord in support of the re-election of incumbent Justicialist Party governor Carlos Rovira.

Following the election, Rovira appointed Closs as chief of cabinet, and in 2005 he was elected to the Senate for the Front, becoming the youngest senator in the country at age 35. He sat in support of then President Néstor Kirchner.

Closs was elected governor in 2007.

Preceded by Carlos Rovira	Governor of Misiones; 10 December 2007–10 December 2015	Succeeded by Hugo Passalacqua
