= Tres Capones =

T res Capones
- Municipality and village
- Location within Misiones Province Location within Argentina
- Country: Argentina
- Province: Misiones Province

Government
  - Intendant: Ramón Gerega

Population (2010)
  - Total: 485
- Time zone: UTC−3 (ART)

Tres Capones is a village and municipality in Misiones Province in north-eastern Argentina. The town lies at the intersection of two gravel roads: Provincial Road No. 2, which connects the west and east Concepción de la Sierra, and Route No. 202.
