= Jardín América =

Village and municipality in Misiones Province, Argentina

- Village
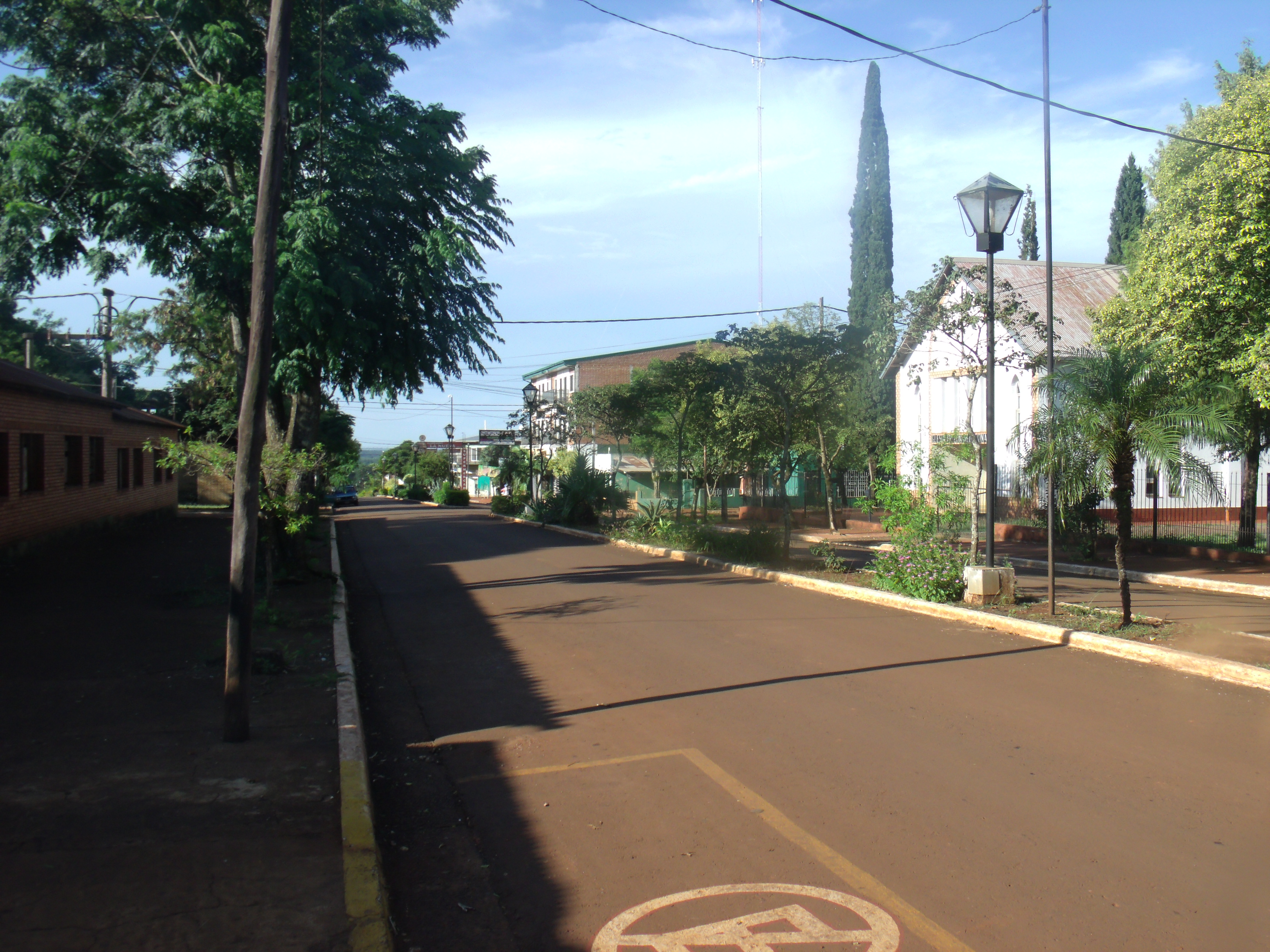
- 9th of July Boulevard

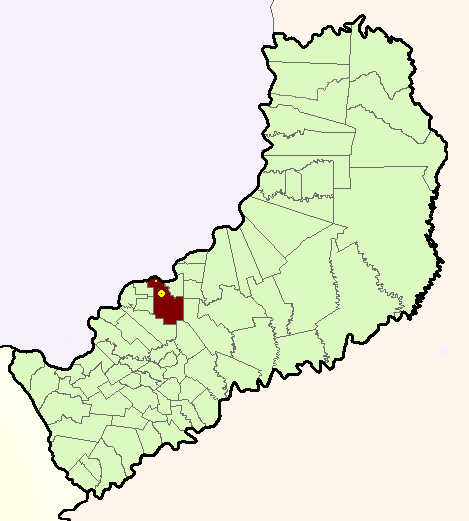
- Misiones province
- Coordinates: 27°02′33.7″S 55°13′37.8″W
- Country: Argentina
- Province: Misiones
- Department: San Ignacio
- Foundation date: May 7, 1946

Government
  - Intendant: Oscar Kornoski
- Elevation (mean): 682 ft (208 m)

Population (2010 Census)
  - Total: 25,705
- Time zone: UTC−3 (ART)
- Postal code: 3328
- Area code: +54 (03743)

Jardín América is a village and municipality of Misiones Province in north-eastern Argentina. It is not the head city of the San Ignacio department, however, it is the largest city in the department. It is located 1,141 km north of Buenos Aires and 104 km from Posadas (the capital city of Misiones Province), on the eastern shore of the Paraná River.

== Culture ==
=== Coat of arms ===
This Coat of arms was formalized in the eighties, created by Antonio Faccendini. The upper border has a ribbon (with Argentinian flag colors) with the foundation date. The central body is divided into three vertical areas: the first symbolizes the economy (yerba, pineapple and a cogwheel representing industry and work). The central part represents nature, with the majestic "Salto Tabay" and the rising sun representing the future, similar to the national and provincial coat of arms. The right area symbolizes the culture: there are hands holding a Bible (according to essence of the pioneers), an Argentinian flag and a Timbó tree around which the community originated.

=== Flag ===
Flag of Jardín América

This symbol was formalized by ordinance in 1999. Its colors symbolize the green jungle of Misiones, the red land of Misiones and the Argentinian flag.

=== Official song ===
The lyrics of the official song was created by Antonio Faccendini and the music was written by Mario Mereles with the rhythm of "Galopa misionera". The original interpretation was performed by Giselle Mereles.

== Tourism ==
Saltos del Tabay (in Spanish) is a municipal camping area where the main attraction is a set of natural waterfalls on the Tabay stream. It is placed near to Jardín América city (approx. 5 km) and has available several services for the tourists: accommodations, tents zone, restaurant, markets, natural swimming pool, sport areas, etc.

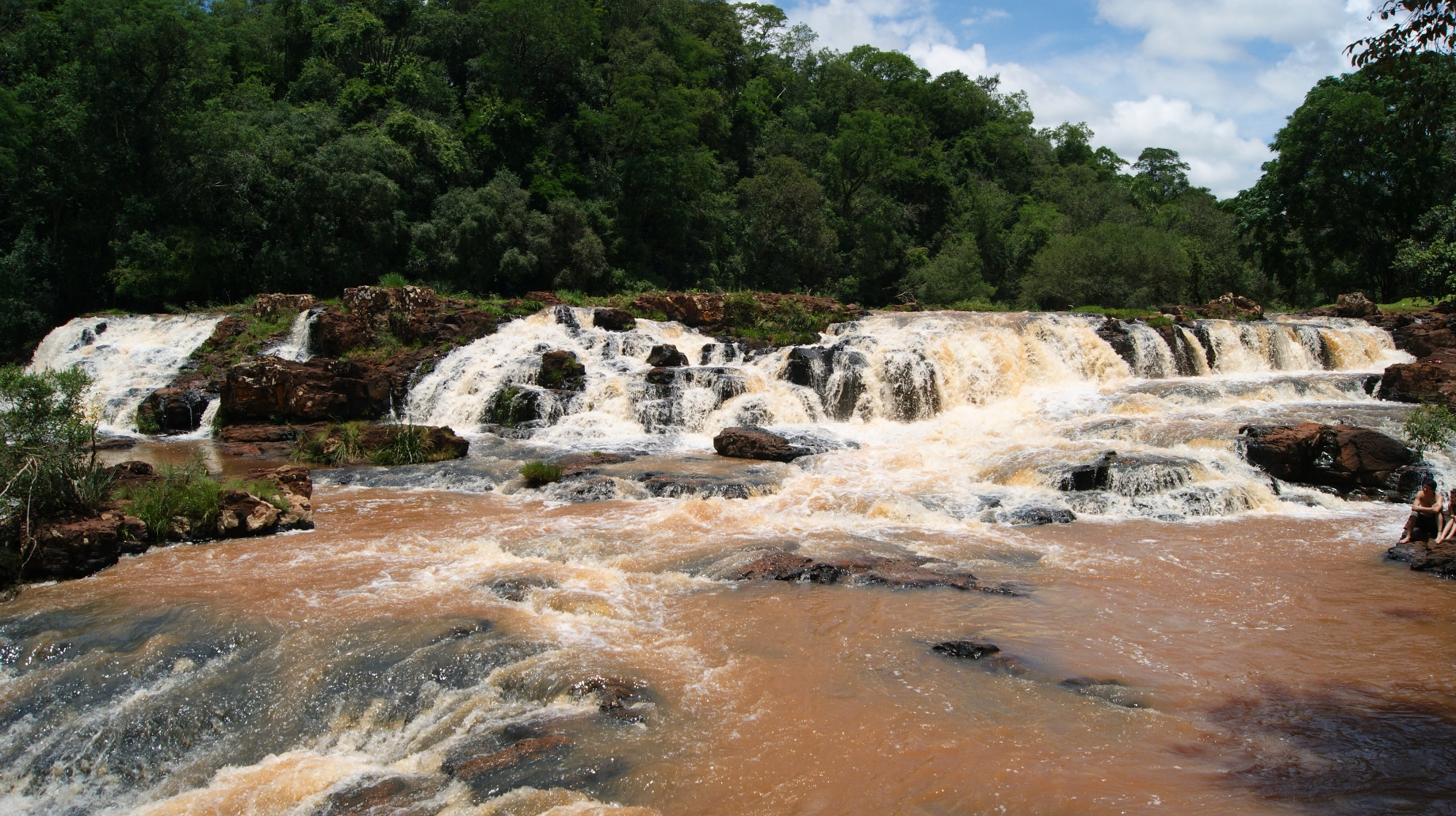
Tabay Waterfalls
