= National University of Misiones =

Argentine university

Coordinates: 27°26′05″S 55°53′17″W

- Universidad Nacional de Misiones
- Type: Public
- Established: 1973
- Rector: Javier Gortari
- Academic staff: 1,557
- Students: 20,472
- Location: Posadas, Misiones, Argentina
- Campus: Ruta Nac. 12, Km. 7½
- Website: unam.edu.ar/

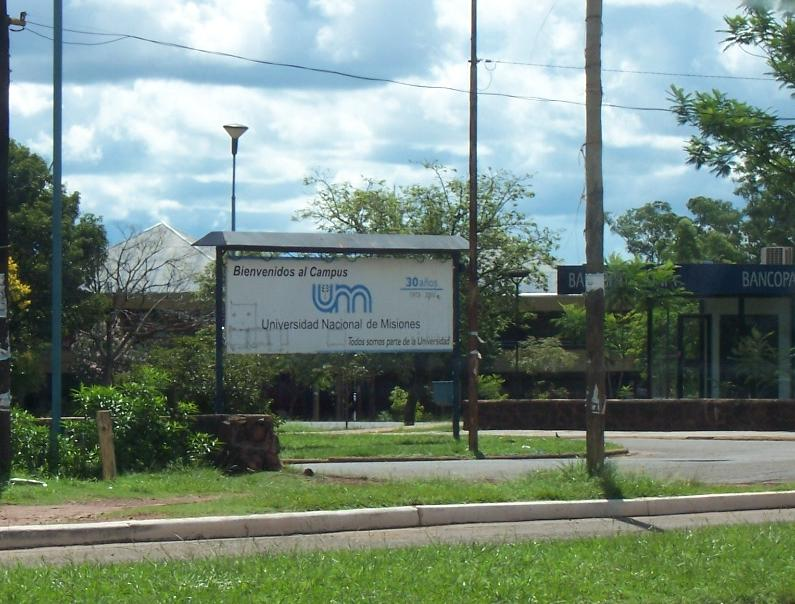
The UNaM's campus in Posadas, Misiones

The National University of Misiones (in Spanish: Universidad Nacional de Misiones, UNaM) is a public university in Argentina. It has a publishing house and a radio station, LRH301 FM Universidad Nacional de Misiones, that streams in Ogg Vorbis format.

== History ==
The university founded by the Argentine law 20.286 on April 16, 1973, as part of the Taquini plan, a program of reorganization of higher education in Argentina. This would involve the foundation of the universities of Jujuy, La Pampa, Lomas de Zamora, Entre Ríos, Luján, Catamarca, Salta, San Juan, San Luis and Santiago del Estero, to form more than 11.000 pupils, on border locations with Paraguay and Brazil.

In 2021, the University awarded a posthumous "honoris causa" prize to the writer Eduardo Galeano.

== Faculties ==
- Arts School – Oberá
- Engineering School – Oberá
- Economic Sciences School – Posadas
- Exact, Chemical and Natural Sciences School – Posadas
- Humanities and Social Sciences School – Posadas
- Forest Sciences School – Eldorado

== Alumni ==
- Maurice Closs, Argentine National Senator
- Alberto Garrido, philosophy student, Argentine–Venezuelan journalist and political analyst
- Asa Cristina Laurell, sociologist and Mexican Under Secretary of Health
- Mercedes Margarita Oviedo, Argentine National Senator and Vice Governor
- Carlos Rovira, chemical engineer and Governor of Misiones.
- María Martínez, Argentine journalist, television presenter, actress and model.

== See also ==
- List of Argentine universities
