= Concepción Department, Misiones =

Concepción Departamento Concepción
- Department
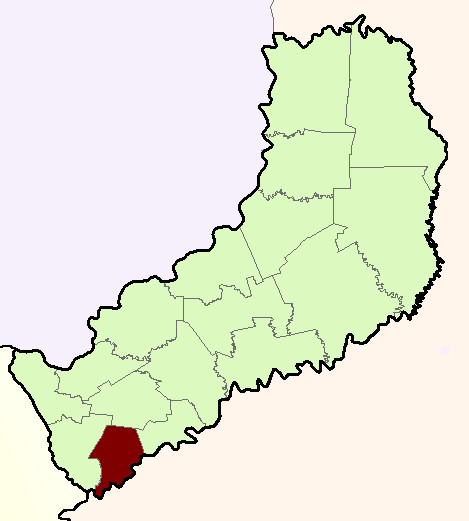
- Interactive map of Concepción
- Country: Argentina
- Seat: Concepción de la Sierra

Area
  - Total: 726 km^{2} (280 sq mi)

Population (2022)
  - Total: 10,348
  - Density: 14.3/km^{2} (36.9/sq mi)

Concepción is a department of the province of Misiones (Argentina).
