= Carlos Rovira (politician) =

Argentine politician (born 1956)

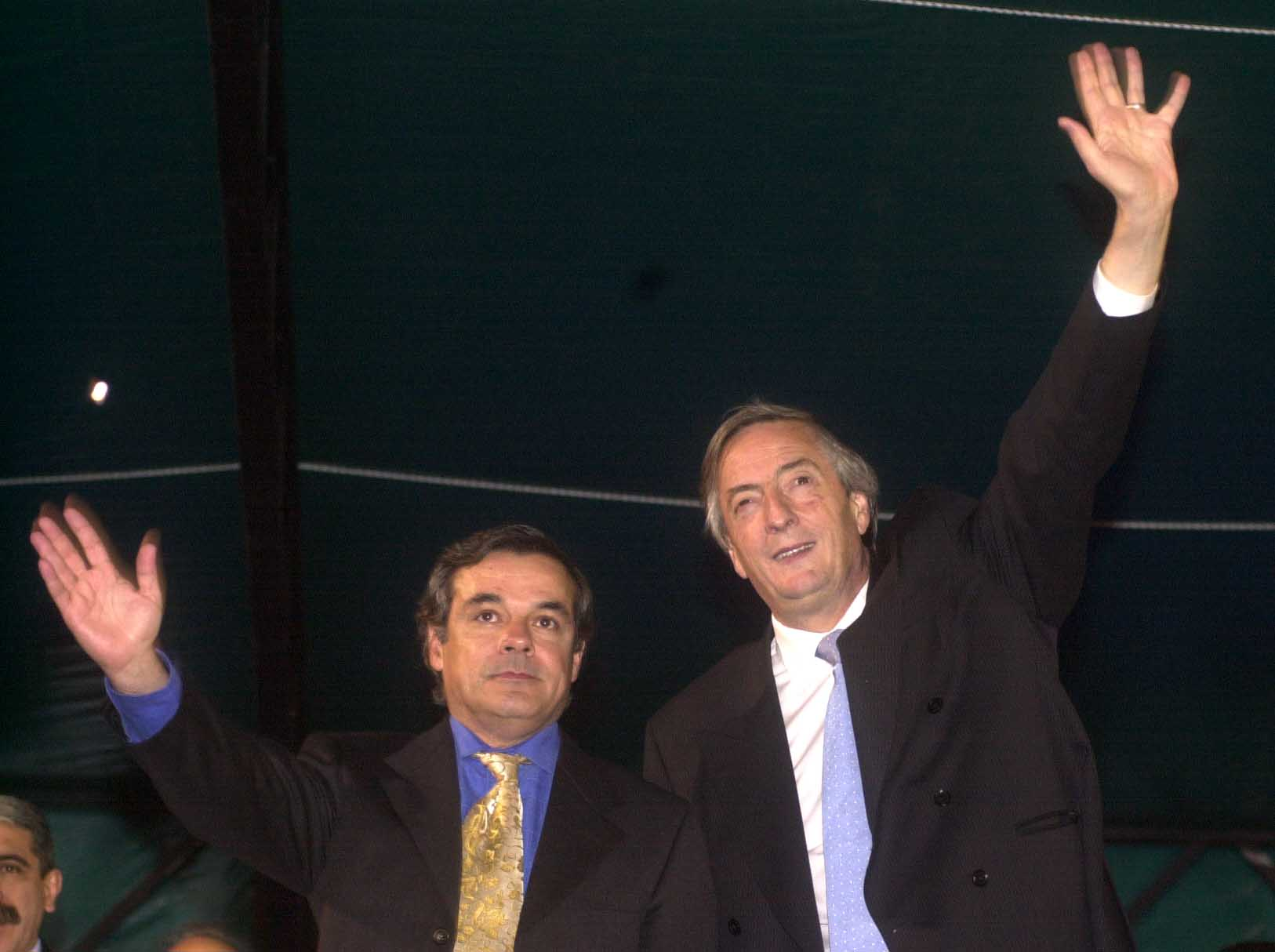
- Rovira with President Néstor Kirchner

Provincial Deputy of Misiones
- Incumbent
- Assumed office 10 December 2007

President of the Chamber of Representatives of Misiones
- In office 10 December 2007 – 10 December 2023
- Succeeded by: Oscar Herrera Ahuad

Governor of Misiones
- In office 10 December 1999 – 10 December 2007
- Preceded by: Ramón Puerta
- Succeeded by: Maurice Closs

Mayor of Posadas
- In office 10 December 1995 – 10 December 1999

Personal details
- Born: February 18, 1956 (age 70) Posadas, Argentina
- Education: National University of Misiones; University of Buenos Aires
- Profession: Chemical engineer
- Website: carloseduardorovira.com.ar

Carlos Eduardo Rovira (born 18 February 1956) is an Argentine politician and chemical engineer who served as governor of Misiones Province from 1999 to 2007 and as mayor of Posadas from 1995 to 1999. He has been a member of the Chamber of Representatives of Misiones since 2007 and served as its president from 2007 to 2023.

Originally a member of the Justicialist Party, Rovira formed the Front for the Renewal of Concord in 2003 and won re-election as governor that year with the support of President Néstor Kirchner.

== Early life and education ==
Rovira was born in Posadas on 18 February 1956. He graduated in chemical engineering from the National University of Misiones and completed postgraduate studies in sanitary engineering at the University of Buenos Aires.

== Political career ==
=== Early offices and governorship ===
From 1992 to 1995, Rovira headed the provincial road agency, the Dirección Provincial de Vialidad, during the governorship of Ramón Puerta. He served as mayor of Posadas from 1995 to 1999 and was elected governor in 1999 as a Justicialist Party candidate.

In 2003, he formed the Front for the Renewal of Concord, bringing together members of the Justicialist Party, the Radical Civic Union and independent political figures. He defeated Puerta in that year's gubernatorial election, securing a second term with Kirchner's support. His second term ended on 10 December 2007.

=== Proposed constitutional reform ===
In 2006, Rovira supported a proposed amendment to the provincial constitution that would have allowed governors and vice-governors to seek unlimited re-election. An election for a constitutional assembly was held on 29 October 2006. The opposition United Front for Dignity, led by retired bishop Joaquín Piña, defeated the Front for the Renewal of Concord, preventing the proposed change.

=== Provincial legislature ===
Rovira became a provincial deputy and president of the Chamber of Representatives of Misiones on 10 December 2007. He was re-elected as a deputy in 2011, 2015, 2019 and 2023.

After sixteen years as president of the chamber, Rovira proposed outgoing governor Oscar Herrera Ahuad as his successor in December 2023. On 10 December, the chamber elected Herrera Ahuad as president and Rovira as first vice-president. Rovira also took the oath of office for a new term as a provincial deputy.

=== Encuentro Misionero ===
In 2026, Rovira led the political organisation Encuentro Misionero. At a party meeting in June, he announced that he did not intend to stand as a candidate and advocated greater participation by younger political leaders.

Political offices
Preceded by Ramón Puerta	Governor of Misiones; 1999–2007	Succeeded by Maurice Closs
