= Apóstoles =

- City
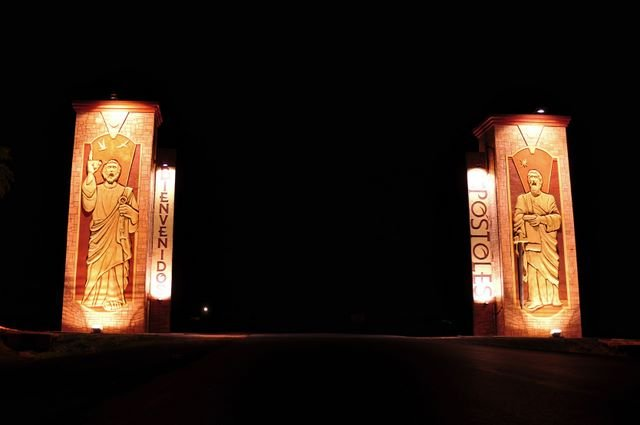

- Flag Coat of arms

- Location of Apóstoles in Misiones Province and Argentina Apóstoles (Argentina)
- Coordinates: 27°55′S 55°46′W
- Country: Argentina
- Province: Misiones
- Department: Apóstoles
- Founded: 1897

Government
  - Intendant: María Eugenia Safrán
- Elevation: 151 m (495 ft)

Population (2001 census)
  - Total: 40,858
- Time zone: UTC−3 (ART)
- CPA base: N3350
- Dialing code: +54 3758
- Website: Official website

Apóstoles is a city in the province of Misiones, Argentina. It has 40,858 inhabitants as per the 2001 census [INDEC], and is the seat of government of Apóstoles Department. It is located on the southwest of the province, 60 km south from the provincial capital Posadas and 27 km from the international Argentina–Brazil border.

Apóstoles is the National Capital of yerba mate, and hosts an annual festival dedicated to this plant, the basis of the popular mate infusion.

The town was established as a Jesuit reduction in 1652. The first wave of immigrants, mainly Polish and Ukrainian, arrived in 1897. The municipality was officially created on 28 November 1913.

== See also ==
- Chango Spasiuk
