= Front for the Renewal of Concord =

Argentine political party

Front for the Renewal of Social Concord Frente Renovador de la Concordia Social
- President: Carlos Rovira
- Governor: Hugo Passalacqua
- Founded: 2003; 23 years ago
- Membership (2022): ▲27 461
- Ideology: Peronism; Misionerismo; Federal Peronism
- Political position: Big tent
- Provincial affiliation: Front for the Renewal of Concord
- National affiliation: Union for the Homeland (2023)
- Argentine Chamber of Deputies (Misiones seats): 4 / 7
- Seats in the Argentine Senate (Misiones seats): 2 / 3
- Seats in the Misiones Legislature: 27 / 40

The Front for the Renewal of Social Concord (Spanish: Frente Renovador de la Concordia Social; FRCS), officially registered as the Party of Social Concord (Spanish: Partido de la Concordia Social) is a Peronist provincial political party in Argentina, based in Misiones Province. It is regarded as the dominant party in the province, controlling both the governorship and the provincial legislature, as well as having a majority in provincial seats in both chambers of the National Congress. It is also the largest party within the eponymous Front for the Renewal of Concord alliance. Its purported ideological basis is the so-called "Misionerismo", which stands for further autonomy for Misiones.

The Front was founded by Carlos Rovira, who was governor of Misiones from 1999 to 2007. Since then, the three past governors of the province (Maurice Closs from 2007 to 2015, Hugo Passalacqua from 2015 to 2019, Oscar Herrera Ahuad from 2019 to 2023, and Passalacqua again since 2023) have belonged to the FRCS.

It is unrelated to the similarly named Renewal Front, with which it had a naming dispute in 2013; the Electoral Justice ruled in favor of the Renewal Front.
