= Chamber of Representatives of Misiones =

Legislative body of Misiones Province, Argentina

Type
- Type: Unicameral

Leadership
- President: Carlos Rovira (FRC) since 10 December 2019
- First Vice President: Hugo Passalacqua (FRC) since 10 December 2019
- Second Vice President: Horacio Guido Loreiro (PRO) since 10 December 2019

Structure
- Seats: 40 deputies
- Political groups: Government (27): Front for the Renewal of Concord (27); Opposition (13): Radical Civic Union (4); Republican Proposal (4); Agrarian and Social Encounter (3); Tierra, Techo y Trabajo (1); Activar (1)
- Length of term: 4 years
- Authority: Constitution of Misiones

Elections
- Voting system: Proportional representation
- Last election: 6 June 2021
- Next election: 2023

Meeting place
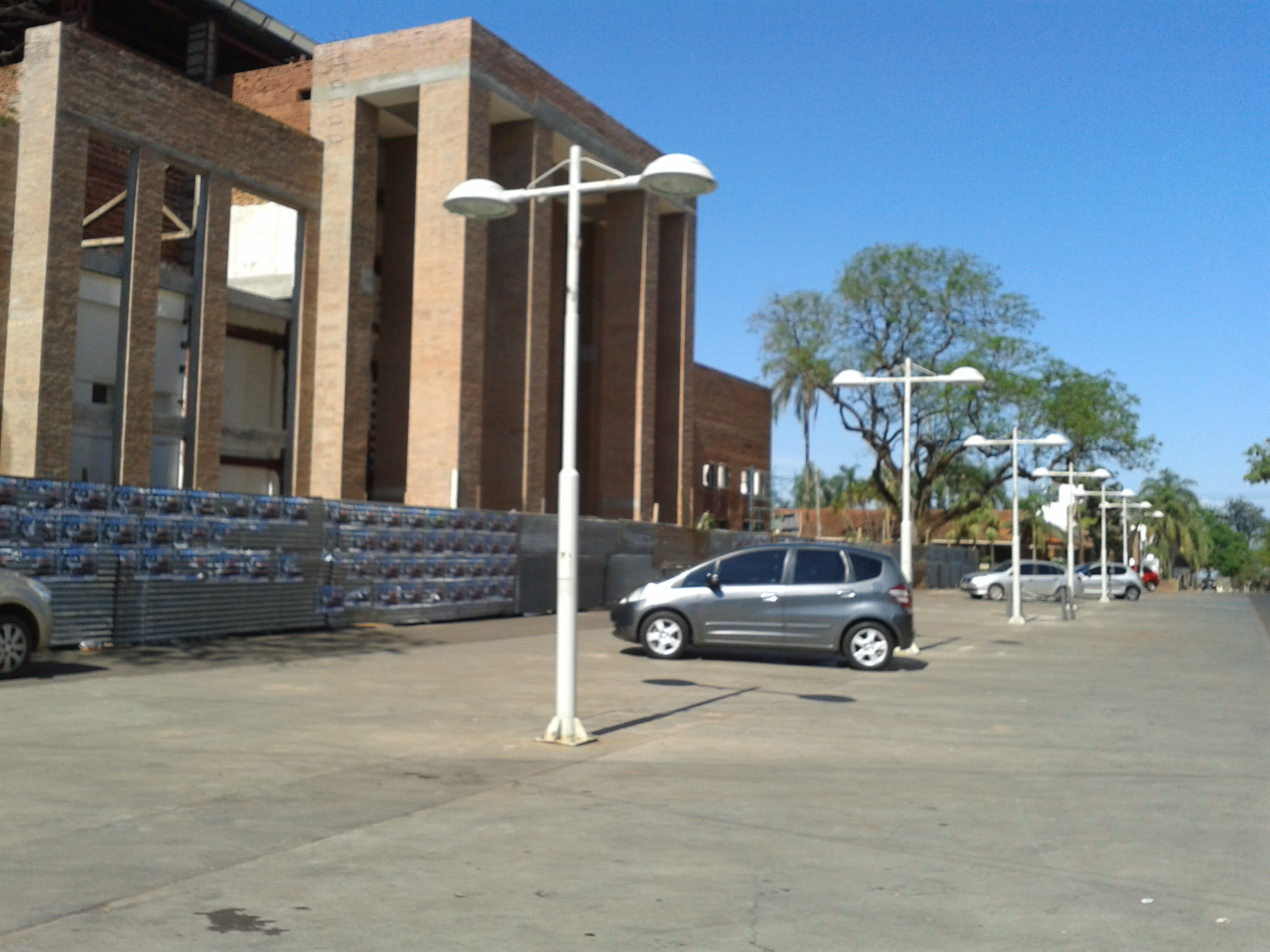
- Edificio de la Cámara de Representantes; Posadas, Misiones

Website
- diputadosmisiones.gov.ar

The Chamber of Representatives of Misiones Province (Spanish: Cámara de Representantes de la Provincia de Misiones) is the unicameral legislative body of Misiones Province, in Argentina. It convenes in the provincial capital, Posadas.

It comprises 40 deputies, elected in a single multi-member district through proportional representation every four years. Elections employ the D'Hondt system. Deputies are elected for four-year terms every two years through staggered elections, and may run for re-election. There is, in addition, a 50% gender quota for party lists in elections.

Its powers and responsibilities are established in the provincial constitution. Unlike most other provincial legislatures in Argentina, the Misiones Chamber of Representatives is not presided by the province's vice governor, but rather has its own presiding officer elected from among its members (presently Carlos Rovira, of the FRC).

The Chamber of Representatives was established in 1953, when the National Territory of Misiones became a province of Argentina.
