= Football rivalries in Argentina =

The derbies of Argentine football are characterized by historical rivalries and the intense passion of the clubs' supporters. A distinction is usually made between historic and modern derbies; the latter emerge when at least one of the teams already had a previous rivalry with another club, eventually becoming their new primary derby. In some cases, these new rivalries gain momentum as the importance of historic derbies diminishes due to a lack of regular matches, especially when clubs compete in different divisions for prolonged periods.

Matches between the so-called "Big Five" (in alphabetical order: Boca Juniors, Independiente, Racing Club, River Plate and San Lorenzo de Almagro) are also considered derbies, although historically not all of them have viewed each other as arch-rivals (with the exception of Boca and River in the Superclásico, and Independiente and Racing in the Avellaneda derby).

Football is the most popular sport in Argentina. This leads to derbies being followed with great interest, in some cases even beyond the country's borders. The most notable historical rivalries are outlined below.

== Superderby ==

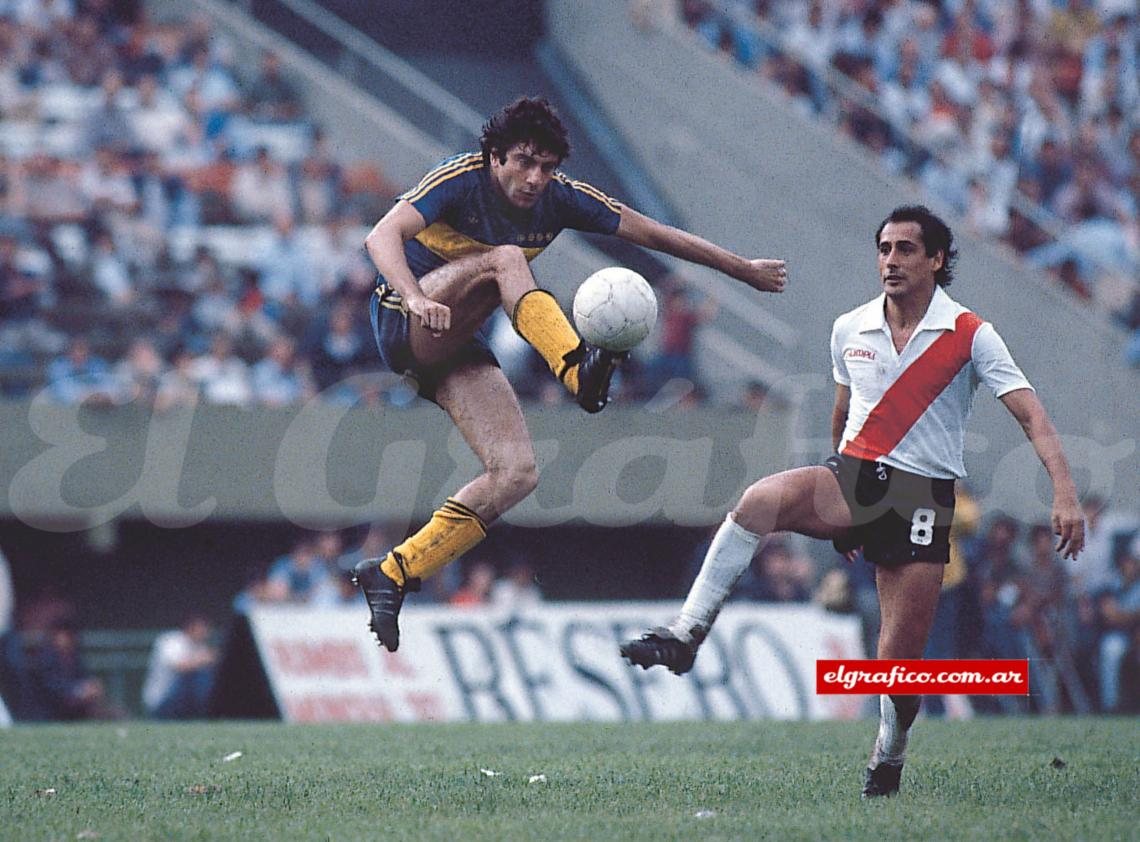
Brindisi (Boca Juniors) and J.J. López (River Plate) during the 1981 Superclásico.

The Superderby (Superclásico) is the most important football match in Argentina, contested between the two most popular and successful clubs in the country: Boca Juniors and River Plate.

Both clubs are based in the city of Buenos Aires, and the match draws the attention of large crowds not only in Argentina, but in many countries around the world. It is recognized by many for the passion displayed by the fans both during the match and in the build-up.

Although it is a nationwide derby—given that the two clubs command approximately 70% of the country's football fans between them—this rivalry began as a neighborhood dispute in the early 20th century, when both clubs shared the La Boca district. It has had numerous chapters that have gone down in the history of Argentine sport, both positive and negative.

=== Head-to-head record ===
This table includes all official matches recognized by the AFA and CONMEBOL. When a match is decided by a penalty shootout, the result after 90 minutes (or 120 if extra time was played) is counted as the final score, regardless of the eventual winner; goals scored in the shootout are not added to the goal count.

- Updated to the last match played on November 9, 2025.

| Competition | Matches | River | Draw | Boca | River Goals | Boca Goals |
|---|---|---|---|---|---|---|
| Primera División | 217 | 73 | 65 | 79 | 277 | 294 |
| National cups | 16 | 5 | 8 | 3 | 18 | 14 |
| Copa Libertadores | 28 | 9 | 8 | 11 | 26 | 32 |
| Other international cups | 4 | 1 | 3 | 0 | 2 | 1 |
| Total | 265 | 88 | 84 | 93 | 323 | 341 |

== Avellaneda derby ==

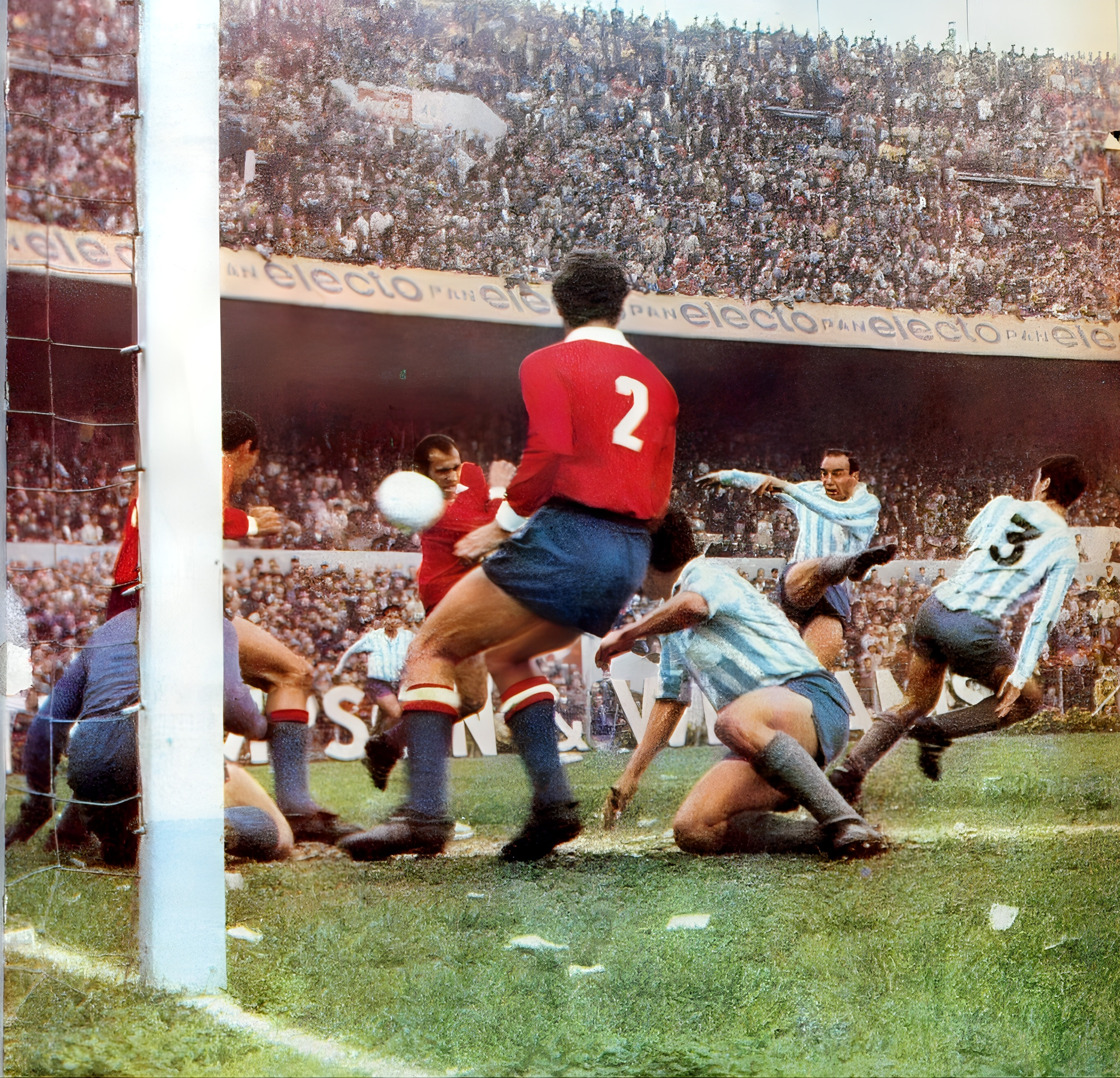
The Avellaneda derby in 1968.

The Avellaneda derby (clásico de Avellaneda) is the football match between Independiente and Racing Club. It is widely considered the second most important rivalry in Argentine football. Both clubs are based in the city of Avellaneda (part of the Greater Buenos Aires metropolitan area) and their stadiums are located less than 300 meters apart, intensifying a historic rivalry that dates back to the early 20th century.

Racing was founded in Avellaneda in 1903 (when the city was still named Barracas al Sud), while Independiente was established in neighboring Buenos Aires in 1904 (officially 1905). After relocating its home ground several times across different neighborhoods, Independiente settled in Avellaneda in 1907. The first official match between the two resulted in a shock 3–2 win for Independiente. This result sparked the rivalry that continues to this day.

Avellaneda is one of the few cities in the world to be home to two World Champion football clubs. This derby holds the distinction of being the first to be contested between two Copa Libertadores winners, as well as the first Argentine derby played between two Intercontinental Cup champions.

=== Head-to-head record ===
This table includes all official matches recognized by the AFA and CONMEBOL.

- Updated to the last match played on March 16, 2025.

| Competition | Matches | Independiente | Draw | Racing | Ind. Goals | Racing Goals |
|---|---|---|---|---|---|---|
| Primera División | 216 | 84 | 70 | 62 | 327 | 276 |
| Second Division | 2 | 1 | 0 | 1 | 1 | 1 |
| National cups | 17 | 4 | 6 | 7 | 17 | 21 |
| Copa Libertadores | 2 | 0 | 1 | 1 | 1 | 2 |
| Total | 237 | 89 | 77 | 71 | 346 | 300 |

== Rosario derby ==
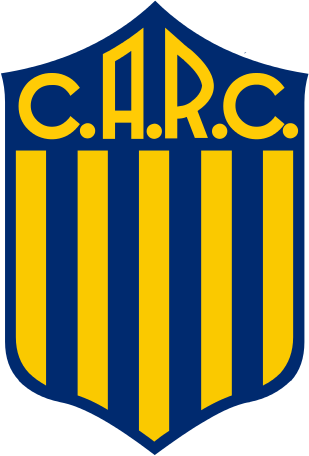

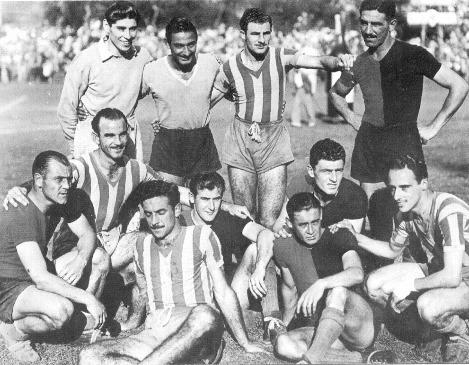
Players from both teams posing together before a derby in the 1940s.

The Rosario derby (clásico rosarino) is the football match between the two most successful clubs in the city of Rosario: Newell's Old Boys and Rosario Central. It is widely considered the most important derby in Argentina between clubs not based in the Buenos Aires metropolitan area.

The rivalry dates back to 1905, when the first official match ended in a 1–0 victory for Newell's. Since then, the clubs have faced each other in various competitions, including the local Rosario Football League, the Argentine Primera División, national cups, and international CONMEBOL tournaments.

The teams' nicknames originate from a well-known incident in the 1920s, when Rosario Central allegedly refused to play a charity match for a leprosy clinic, earning them the moniker Canallas (Scoundrels). Newell's Old Boys stepped in to play the game and were subsequently dubbed Los Leprosos (The Lepers).

Newell's Old Boys and Rosario Central are the only clubs from the interior of Argentina (outside Greater Buenos Aires) to have won official AFA national titles in both the Primera División and national cups. Furthermore, both institutions have been recognized by FIFA as "Classic Clubs" of Argentine football, an honor held by only 11 clubs in the country.

The derby is renowned for its intense passion and historical rivalry. Several sociological studies on football indicate that Rosario is one of the few urban areas in Argentina—along with La Plata, Santa Fe, Córdoba, and San Miguel de Tucumán—where the local clubs surpass the popularity of the nation's two giants, River Plate and Boca Juniors.

=== Head-to-head record ===
This table includes all official matches recognized by the AFA, CONMEBOL, and the Rosario Football League.

- Updated to the last match played on August 23, 2025.

| Competition | Matches | Newell's | Draw | Central | Newell's Goals | Central Goals |
|---|---|---|---|---|---|---|
| Primera División | 178 | 43 | 79 | 56 | 183 | 211 |
| National cups | 21 | 4 | 3 | 14 | 13 | 42 |
| Provincial cups | 2 | 0 | 2 | 0 | 0 | 0 |
| Regional leagues & cups | 75 | 29 | 19 | 27 | 108 | 132 |
| Copa Libertadores | 3 | 0 | 2 | 1 | 2 | 3 |
| Other international cups | 2 | 0 | 1 | 1 | 0 | 1 |
| Total | 281 | 76 | 106 | 99 | 306 | 389 |

== Huracán – San Lorenzo de Almagro ==

The derby between Huracán and San Lorenzo de Almagro is historically known as the "Porteño derby" (Clásico porteño). It originated from the geographic proximity of the two clubs, which are rooted in bordering districts in the south of Buenos Aires. For decades, their stadiums were located just eight blocks (approx. 500 meters) apart.

While it began as a local rivalry, it has grown to become one of the most significant matches in Argentine football, often cited as the third most important derby in the country after the Superclásico and the Avellaneda derby. Both institutions are among the oldest and most successful in Argentina, and both are recognized by FIFA as "Classic Clubs" of the country.

San Lorenzo was founded in April 1908 in the Almagro neighborhood, but soon moved to Boedo, where its iconic stadium, the Viejo Gasómetro, stood until 1979. In 1993, the club inaugurated its current stadium, the Nuevo Gasómetro, in the nearby Flores district. Huracán was founded in November 1908 in Nueva Pompeya and later established its headquarters and stadium in Parque Patricios, a neighborhood that borders Boedo.

The rivalry permeates the literature and daily life of these southern Buenos Aires neighborhoods. Although San Lorenzo has historically dominated the head-to-head record and is considered one of the "Big Five" of Argentine football with a massive nationwide fanbase, Huracán has maintained its status as a fiercely traditional rival, especially during the amateur era when it was a dominant force.

=== Head-to-head record ===
This table includes all official matches recognized by the AFA.

- Updated to the last match played on February 8, 2026.

| Competition | Matches | Huracán | Draw | San Lorenzo | Huracán Goals | San Lorenzo Goals |
|---|---|---|---|---|---|---|
| Primera División | 177 | 46 | 47 | 83 | 217 | 312 |
| National cups | 16 | 3 | 9 | 4 | 16 | 17 |
| Total | 193 | 49 | 56 | 87 | 233 | 329 |

== La Plata derby ==

The La Plata derby (Clásico platense), also known as the "Derby of the diagonals" (Clásico de las diagonales) due to the city's distinctive urban layout, is contested between the two major clubs in La Plata: Estudiantes de La Plata and Gimnasia y Esgrima La Plata.

The first official meeting between the two teams took place on August 27, 1916, during the First Division Championship of the amateur era, following Gimnasia's promotion in 1915. Gimnasia won that inaugural match 1–0 thanks to an own goal by Ludovico Pastor. Since then, the rivalry has become one of the most prominent in Argentine football, with a long tradition of clashes in regular league championships, national cups, and, starting in 2014, in CONMEBOL international tournaments.

Similar to Rosario, Santa Fe, Córdoba, and San Miguel de Tucumán, La Plata is one of the few cities in Argentina where the local clubs enjoy greater popularity than the national giants, Boca Juniors and River Plate.

=== Head-to-head record ===
This table includes all official matches recognized by the AFA and CONMEBOL.

- Updated to the last match played on December 8, 2025.

| Competition | Matches | Estudiantes | Draw | Gimnasia | Est. Goals | Gim. Goals |
|---|---|---|---|---|---|---|
| Primera División | 178 | 67 | 63 | 48 | 265 | 213 |
| National cups | 11 | 1 | 7 | 3 | 9 | 10 |
| International cups | 2 | 1 | 1 | 0 | 1 | 0 |
| Total | 191 | 69 | 71 | 51 | 275 | 223 |

== Córdoba derby ==

The Córdoba derby (clásico cordobés) is the major football rivalry in the city of Córdoba, contested between the two most popular clubs in the province: Belgrano (nicknamed Los Piratas) and Talleres (nicknamed Los Matadores).

It is one of the oldest derbies in Argentina, with the first match dating back to May 17, 1914, which ended in a 1–0 victory for Belgrano with a goal by José Lascano. With over 400 matches played (including friendlies), it is the most frequently contested derby in Argentine football history.

In official matches (AFA and Regional Leagues), Talleres holds an advantage of 20 wins over Belgrano. However, when counting the absolute total history, including friendly matches, the record is remarkably even: as of October 2025, both clubs have won 133 matches each, with 139 draws.

The exact number of historical encounters is sometimes debated due to anomalies in the early tournaments of the Liga Cordobesa de Fútbol. Furthermore, there is a record of a match played in 1975 for which no result is known, as the local press boycotted the coverage of the event.

=== Head-to-head record ===
This table includes all official matches recognized by the AFA and the Córdoba Football League.

- Updated to the last match played on October 5, 2025.

| Competition | Matches | Belgrano | Draw | Talleres | Belgrano Goals | Talleres Goals |
|---|---|---|---|---|---|---|
| Primera División | 26 | 5 | 16 | 5 | 20 | 22 |
| Second Division | 16 | 5 | 6 | 5 | 14 | 16 |
| National cups | 3 | 0 | 2 | 1 | 2 | 3 |
| Regional leagues | 214 | 66 | 63 | 85 | 351 | 394 |
| Friendly matches | 147 | 57 | 52 | 37 | 258 | 226 |
| Grand Total | 406 | 133 | 139 | 133 | 645 | 661 |

== Santa Fe derby ==
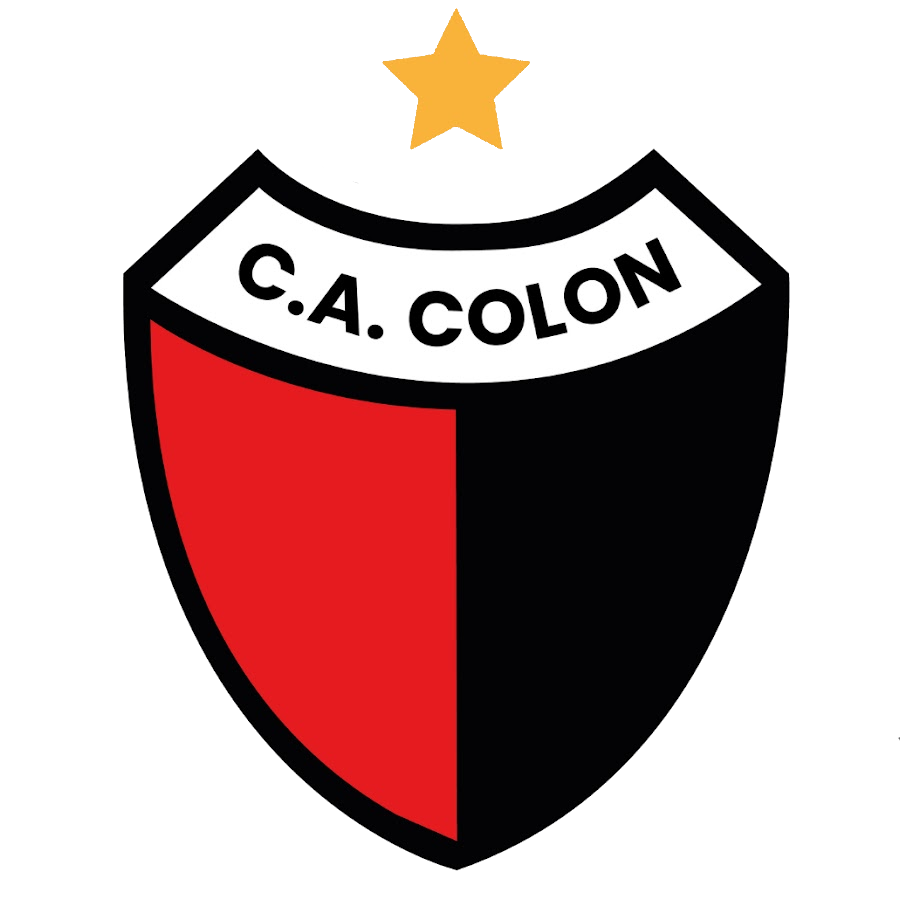

The Santa Fe derby (Clásico santafesino) is contested between the two major football clubs in the city of Santa Fe: Colón (nicknamed Sabaleros) and Unión (nicknamed Tatengues).

The rivalry dates back to the amateur era, with the first recorded match taking place in 1913, a friendly which Colón won 3–2. The teams have faced each other across three distinct eras: the amateur period (1913–1931), the professional Liga Santafesina de Fútbol (1931–1939), and finally within the AFA national system (from 1948 onwards). The first official AFA match occurred on August 1, 1948, during the Second Division championship, resulting in a 1–0 victory for Colón.

Similar to Rosario, La Plata, and San Miguel de Tucumán, Santa Fe is considered one of the few cities in Argentina where the local clubs enjoy greater popularity than the national powerhouses, Boca Juniors and River Plate. As of February 14, 2026, Colón is the only team in the city to have won an Argentine tournament, winning the 2021 Copa de la Liga.

=== Head-to-head record ===
This table includes all official matches recognized by the AFA and the Santa Fe League.

- Updated to the last match played on October 1, 2023.

| Competition | Matches | Colón | Draw | Unión | Colón Goals | Unión Goals |
|---|---|---|---|---|---|---|
| Primera División | 58 | 13 | 28 | 17 | 54 | 61 |
| National cups | 4 | 1 | 3 | 0 | 5 | 2 |
| Second Division | 36 | 14 | 9 | 13 | 48 | 49 |
| Regional leagues | 61 | 20 | 14 | 27 | 81 | 99 |
| Total | 159 | 48 | 54 | 57 | 188 | 211 |

== Tucumán derby ==

The Tucumán derby (Clásico tucumano) is the football match between the two most important clubs in the province of Tucumán: Club Atlético Tucumán (nicknamed El Decano) and San Martín de Tucumán (nicknamed El Santo). Both clubs are based in the provincial capital, San Miguel de Tucumán. It is widely considered the most important derby in Northern Argentina due to the large fanbases of both teams and the historical significance of the rivalry in the region.

In September 2021, historical research updated the official head-to-head record by validating a match played on June 8, 1913, which ended in a 10–0 victory for Atlético Tucumán, the largest margin of victory in the history of the derby. It is, alongside the Córdoba derby, one of the most played games in the history of Argentine football.

Throughout their history, Atlético Tucumán has won 76 official titles (regional and national), while San Martín has won 65.

=== Head-to-head record ===
This table includes all official matches recognized by the AFA, the Consejo Federal, and the Tucumán Football League.

- Updated to the last match played on September 5, 2021.

| Competition | Matches | Atlético | Draw | San Martín | Atlético Goals | San Martín Goals |
|---|---|---|---|---|---|---|
| Primera División | 12 | 5 | 4 | 3 | 17 | 15 |
| Second Division | 30 | 6 | 15 | 9 | 24 | 30 |
| National cups | 1 | 1 | 0 | 0 | 3 | 1 |
| Regional leagues & tournaments | 241 | 89 | 69 | 83 | 430 | 412 |
| Friendly matches | 60 | 23 | 16 | 21 | 93 | 84 |
| Grand Total | 344 | 124 | 104 | 116 | 567 | 542 |

== Western derby ==

The Western derby (Clásico del Oeste) is a football rivalry contested between the two most prominent clubs in the western part of the autonomous city of Buenos Aires: Ferro Carril Oeste and Vélez Sarsfield. The fixture takes its name from the geographical location of both clubs, which are situated west of the city's historical center.

The rivalry dates back to the amateur era, with the first official match played on June 6, 1920, resulting in a 5–0 away victory for Vélez Sarsfield. Although it is one of the oldest derbies in Argentine football, it has not been played officially since June 24, 2000. On that date, during the Clausura 2000 tournament, Vélez defeated Ferro 1–0 away. Following that season, Ferro Carril Oeste was relegated to the Primera B Nacional (second division) and has yet to return to the top flight as of 2026, leaving the derby dormant for over two decades.

Historically, Vélez Sarsfield leads the head-to-head record. Since the inception of the professional era in 1931, Vélez has maintained a consistent advantage over their western neighbors.

=== Head-to-head record ===
This table includes all official matches (Amateur and Professional eras) recognized by the AFA.

- Data updated to the last match played on June 24, 2000.

| Competition | Matches | Ferro | Draw | Vélez | Ferro Goals | Vélez Goals |
|---|---|---|---|---|---|---|
| Total Official Matches | 155 | 48 | 46 | 61 | 196 | 244 |

== Southern derby ==
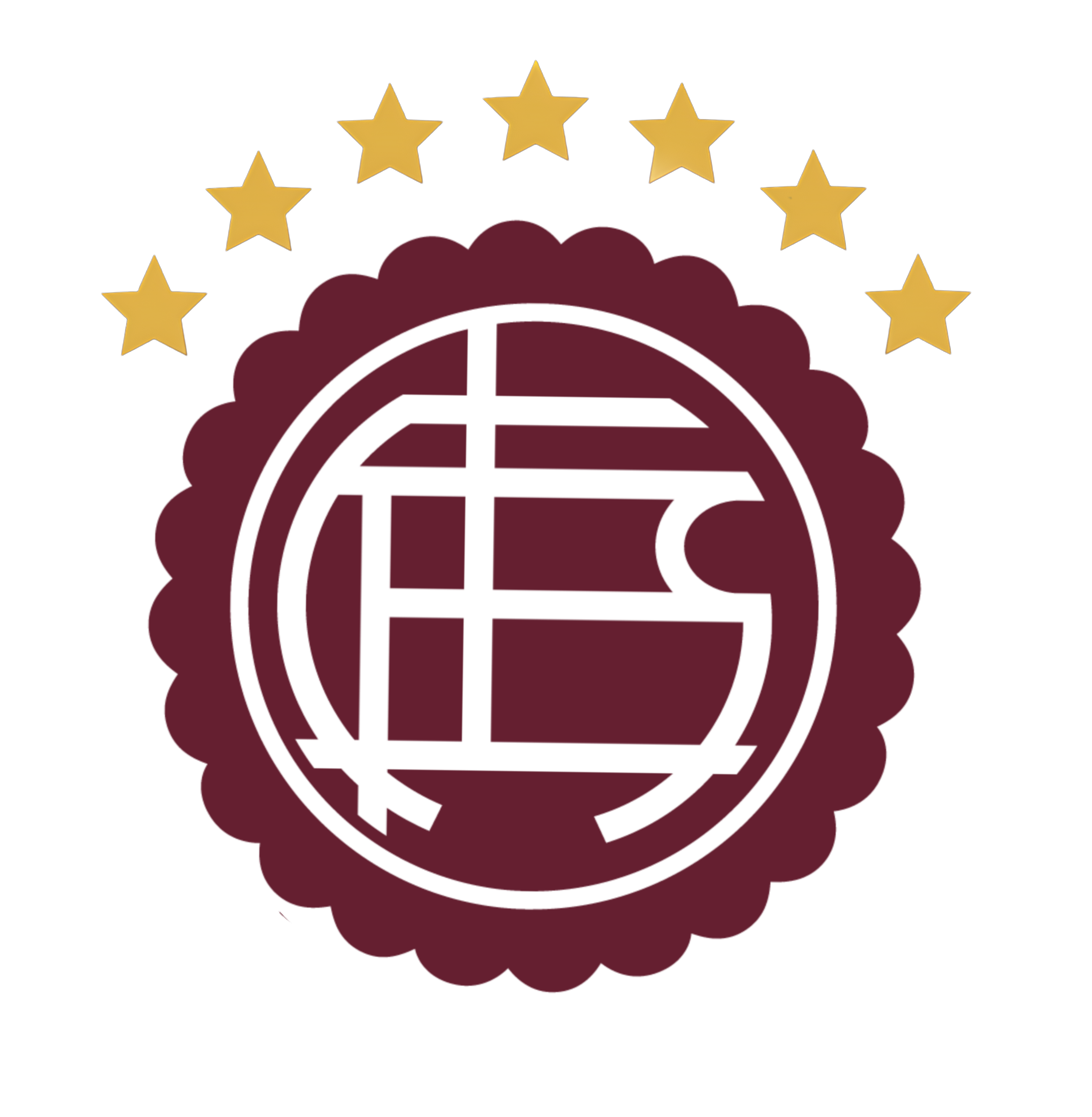

The Southern derby (Clásico del Sur) is the football match contested between Banfield and Lanús. Both clubs are located in the southern zone of the Greater Buenos Aires metropolitan area, with their stadiums separated by approximately 4 kilometers.

Unlike many other Argentine derbies that date back to the early 20th century, this is considered a "modern derby." Historically, Banfield's main rival was Los Andes (from the Lomas de Zamora district), while Lanús's traditional rival was Talleres de Remedios de Escalada. During the 1960s and 1970s, the fanbases of Banfield and Lanús maintained a friendly relationship.

The rivalry intensified during the 1980s and 1990s, as both teams competed simultaneously in the Second Division for promotion and subsequently consolidated their positions in the Argentine Primera División. The institutional growth of both clubs, combined with the decline of their traditional rivals, solidified this fixture as the most important matchup in the southern region of the conurbation.

=== Head-to-head record ===
This table includes all official matches recognized by the AFA.

- Updated to the last match played on November 3, 2025.

| Competition | Matches | Banfield | Draw | Lanús | Banfield Goals | Lanús Goals |
|---|---|---|---|---|---|---|
| Primera División | 105 | 42 | 32 | 31 | 128 | 113 |
| Second Division | 24 | 7 | 7 | 10 | 36 | 38 |
| National cups | 5 | 4 | 1 | 0 | 7 | 2 |
| Total | 134 | 53 | 40 | 41 | 172 | 155 |

== Villa Crespo derby ==
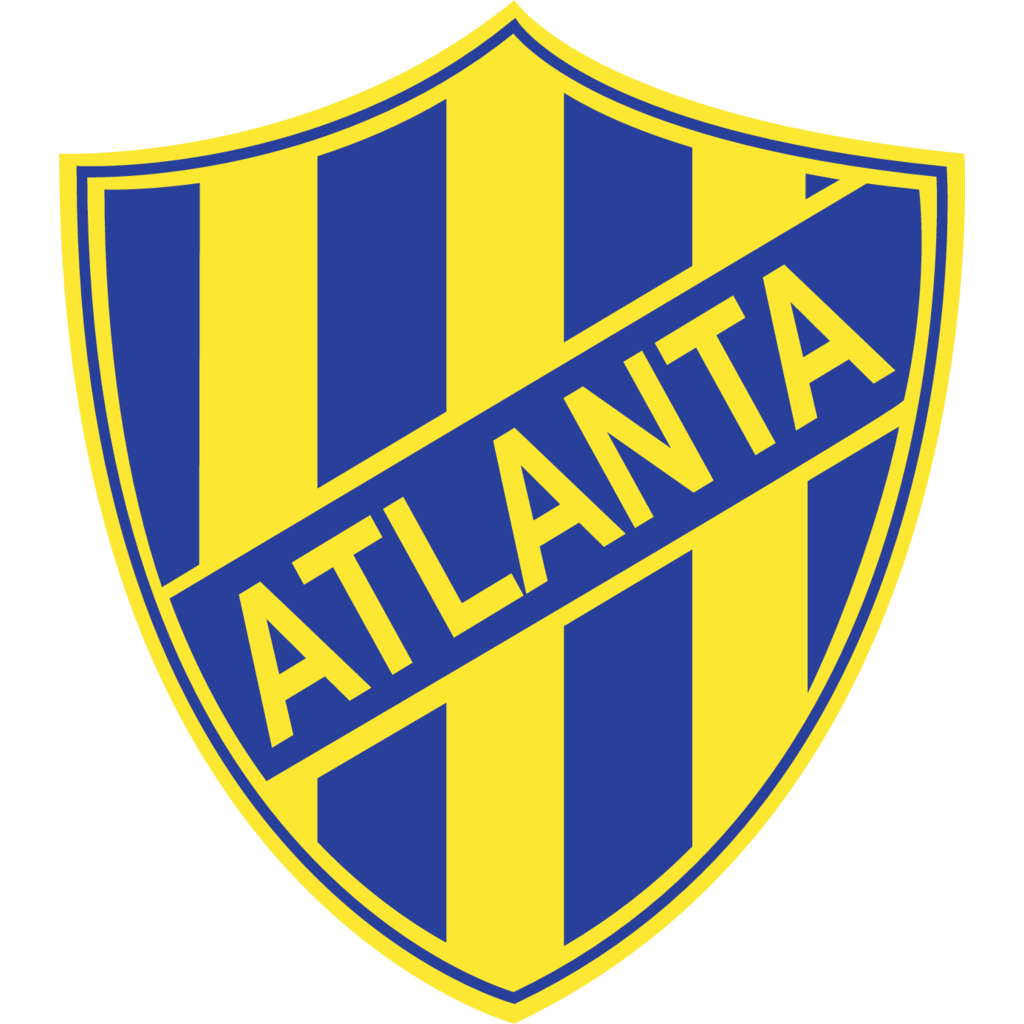

The Villa Crespo derby (Clásico de Villa Crespo) is the football rivalry between Atlanta and Chacarita Juniors. The rivalry originated in the Villa Crespo neighborhood of Buenos Aires, where both clubs had their stadiums located virtually next to each other between 1922 and 1944.

For over two decades, the grounds were separated only by a party wall, with Atlanta's stadium at Humboldt 470 and Chacarita's at Humboldt 345. In 1944, Chacarita Juniors moved its stadium to Villa Maipú in the San Martín Partido (part of the Greater Buenos Aires metropolitan area), but the rivalry remained due to its historical roots.

The first official match took place on November 13, 1927, ending in a 2–0 victory for Chacarita Juniors. Atlanta achieved its first victory in 1930, winning 1–0 away. It is one of the most traditional derbies in Argentine football, having been played 100 times in the Argentine Primera División.

=== Head-to-head record ===
This table includes all matches played in official tournaments recognized by the AFA. It includes matches from the 1934 season (when Atlanta merged with Argentinos Juniors) and a match in 1940 awarded to Atlanta due to Chacarita's disaffiliation.

- Updated to the last match played on August 19, 2023.

| Competition | Matches | Atlanta | Draw | Chacarita | Atlanta Goals | Chacarita Goals |
|---|---|---|---|---|---|---|
| Primera División | 100 | 30 | 25 | 45 | 120 | 159 |
| Second Division | 23 | 5 | 12 | 6 | 23 | 26 |
| Third Division | 14 | 1 | 6 | 7 | 7 | 17 |
| National cups | 2 | 0 | 1 | 1 | 1 | 2 |
| Total | 139 | 36 | 44 | 59 | 151 | 204 |

== North Zone derby ==

The North Zone derby (Clásico de la Zona Norte) is the football match contested between two historic clubs from the northern area of Greater Buenos Aires: Club Atlético Platense and Club Atlético Tigre.

The rivalry originated in the early 20th century. While Platense was historically based in the Núñez neighborhood of Buenos Aires, its stadium was located just across the city limit, close to its current home in Florida (inaugurated in 1979). Tigre is based in Victoria, near the city of Tigre.

The animosity began on April 23, 1916, during a match at Tigre's old stadium in Rincón de Milberg. Violent incidents occurred when Platense supporters were attacked by Tigre fans while attempting to cross the bridge over the Reconquista River. Since then, a mutual enmity has existed.

In modern times, the clubs fought intense battles for promotion. In 2004, Tigre won the Primera B Metropolitana championship at Platense's stadium. In 2007, they met in the final of the "Torneo Reducido" for a spot in the promotion playoffs to the Primera División, which Tigre won. After 42 years without meeting in the top flight, the derby returned to the First Division in 2022.

=== Head-to-head record ===
This table includes all official matches recognized by the AFA.

- Updated to the last match played on November 3, 2024.

| Competition | Matches | Platense | Draw | Tigre |
|---|---|---|---|---|
| Primera División | 64 | 26 | 21 | 17 |
| Second Division | 34 | 12 | 12 | 10 |
| Third Division | 7 | 3 | 2 | 2 |
| National cups | 8 | 3 | 2 | 3 |
| Total | 111 | 44 | 37 | 32 |

== All Boys–Nueva Chicago derby ==
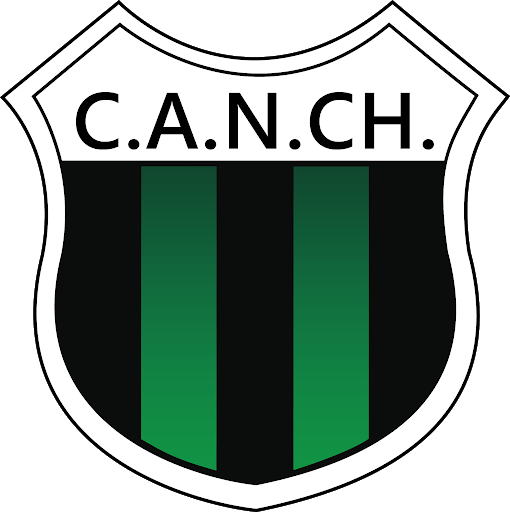

The All Boys–Nueva Chicago derby (Clásico All Boys-Nueva Chicago) is the football match between All Boys and Nueva Chicago, two clubs located in the west of the city of Buenos Aires. It is traditionally referred to by the media and fans as the Superclásico del Ascenso ("Superderby of the Promotion Leagues") because they are the two institutions with the most seasons in the Second Division and have played over 100 matches exclusively in the lower divisions.

The rivalry began on June 15, 1919, making it the oldest sporting rivalry in the Argentine promotion leagues and the third oldest in the city of Buenos Aires, behind Boca Juniors vs. River Plate (1913) and Huracán vs. San Lorenzo (1915).

The animosity is fueled by geographical proximity; the clubs' headquarters are separated by approximately seven kilometers, with the Mataderos (Nueva Chicago) and Floresta (All Boys) neighborhoods divided by Parque Avellaneda. Historically, the areas were connected by the number 40 tram line. Social differences also contributed to the rivalry: Floresta was historically associated with weekend villas and English descendants who practiced football in schools, while Mataderos was a working-class area centered around slaughterhouses where the sport was popularized by British sailors in vacant lots.

The "Superclásico del Ascenso" term was originally a marketing initiative by both clubs printed on match jerseys, but it was later adopted by major national media outlets like Telefe, TyC Sports, Clarín, Página/12, La Voz del Interior, and La Gaceta, to describe the fixture. Recently, the Chilean newspaper El Deportivo ranked it among the top 30 derbies in the Americas.

=== Head-to-head record ===
This table includes all official matches recognized by the AFA.

- Updated to the last match played on June 9, 2023.

| Competition | Matches | All Boys | Draw | Nueva Chicago | All Boys Goals | Nueva Chicago Goals |
|---|---|---|---|---|---|---|
| Primera División | 8 | 1 | 2 | 5 | 11 | 21 |
| Second Division | 100 | 34 | 34 | 32 | 154 | 157 |
| Third Division | 13 | 5 | 4 | 4 | 9 | 15 |
| National cups | 2 | 1 | 1 | 0 | 2 | 0 |
| Total | 123 | 41 | 41 | 41 | 176 | 193 |

== Cuyo derby ==
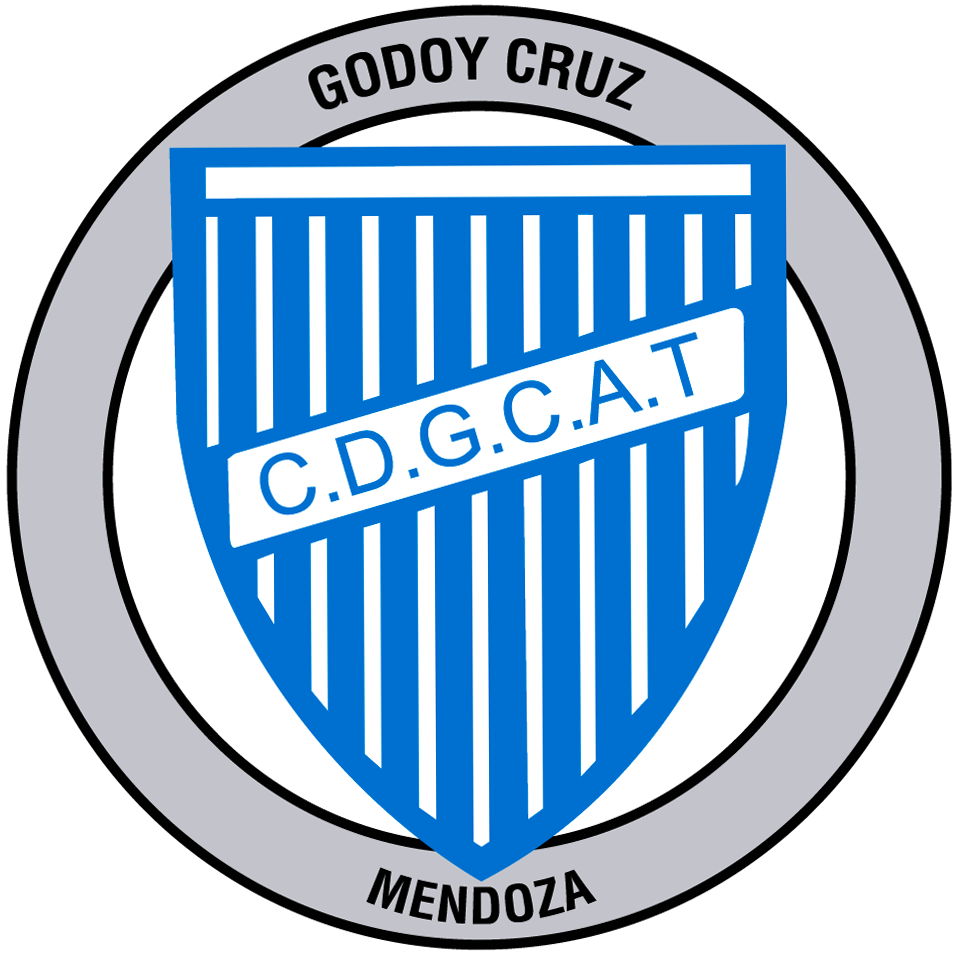

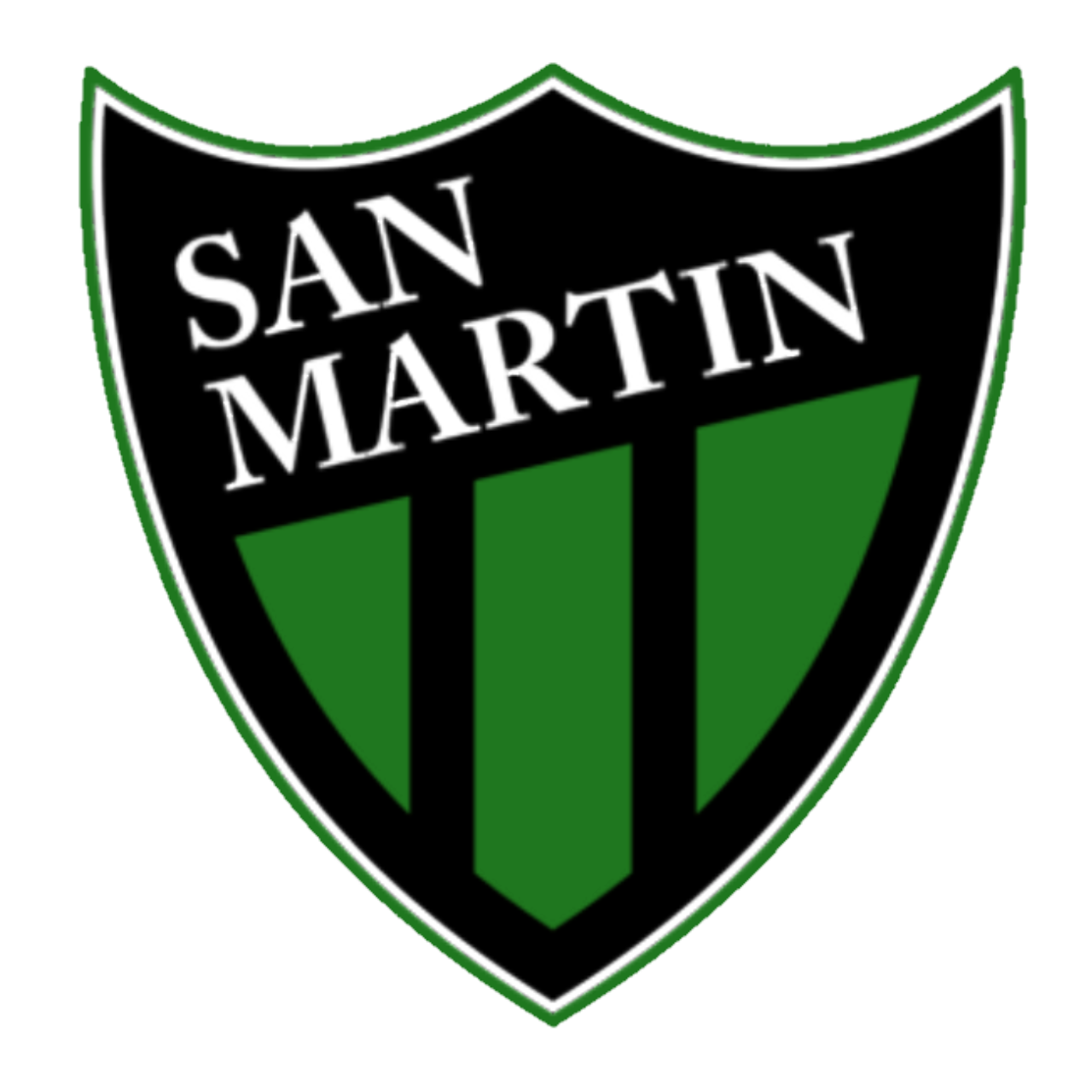

The Cuyo derby (Clásico de Cuyo) is the most important football match in the Cuyo region of western Argentina. It is an interprovincial rivalry contested between Godoy Cruz from the Mendoza Province and San Martín from the San Juan Province.

Unlike most Argentine derbies, which are intra-city rivalries, this matchup represents the sporting dominance of the region. Historically, both clubs had local rivals in their respective cities (Andes Talleres for Godoy Cruz and Juventud Alianza for San Martín), but as both teams ascended to the national divisions, their direct confrontation became the main derby for both institutions.

The first official match took place on January 7, 1990, during the Torneo del Interior, ending in a 2–2 draw. The first meeting in the Argentine Primera División occurred on October 26, 2011, also finishing in a 2–2 draw.

=== Head-to-head record ===
This table includes all matches played in official tournaments and friendly competitions, as recognized by the clubs' historical records.

- Updated to the last match played on November 2, 2025.

| Competition | Matches | Godoy Cruz | Draw | San Martín | Godoy Cruz Goals | San Martín Goals |
|---|---|---|---|---|---|---|
| Primera División | 14 | 6 | 5 | 3 | 14 | 11 |
| Second Division | 25 | 7 | 6 | 12 | 29 | 30 |
| Third Division | 8 | 1 | 4 | 3 | 7 | 11 |
| Copa Argentina | 1 | 1 | 0 | 0 | 0 | 0 |
| Friendly matches | 4 | 3 | 0 | 1 | 9 | 7 |
| Total | 52 | 18 | 15 | 19 | 59 | 59 |

== Complete list ==
=== Interprovincial Rivalries ===
==== Buenos Aires (city)/Buenos Aires Province ====
- Buenos Aires/Avellaneda: San Telmo vs. Dock Sud – Darsenero derby
- Buenos Aires/Ciudad Evita: Español vs. Italiano – Derby of collectivities
- Buenos Aires/Isidro Casanova: Nueva Chicago vs. Almirante Brown – La Matanza derby
- Buenos Aires/Loma Hermosa: General Lamadrid vs. Justo José de Urquiza
- Buenos Aires/Morón: Nueva Chicago vs. Morón
- Buenos Aires/Munro: Excursionistas vs. Colegiales
- Buenos Aires/San Martín: Atlanta vs. Chacarita Juniors – Villa Crespo derby
- Buenos Aires/Tapiales: Yupanqui vs. Lugano – Villa Lugano derby
- Buenos Aires/Vicente López: Argentinos Juniors vs. Platense

==== Cuyo ====
- Godoy Cruz/San Juan: Godoy Cruz vs. San Martín de San Juan – Cuyo derby

==== Littoral ====
- Resistencia/Corrientes: Chaco For Ever vs. Deportivo Mandiyú – General Belgrano Bridge derby
- Resistencia/Corrientes: Chaco For Ever vs. Boca Unidos – Modern littoral derby
- Resistencia/Corrientes: Sarmiento vs. Boca Unidos – Aurirrojo derby
- Corrientes/Posadas: Deportivo Mandiyú vs. Guaraní Antonio Franco – Mesopotamian derby
- Estación Apóstoles/Colonia Liebig's: Sportivo Ferrocarril vs. Sol de Mayo de Colonia Liebig

==== Northwest ====
- San Salvador de Jujuy/Salta: Gimnasia y Esgrima de Jujuy vs. Juventud Antoniana – Northern Derby
- San Salvador de Jujuy/Salta: Gimnasia y Esgrima de Jujuy vs. Gimnasia y Tiro
- San Salvador de Jujuy/Salta: Gimnasia y Esgrima de Jujuy vs. Central Norte
- San Salvador de Jujuy/San Miguel de Tucumán: Gimnasia y Esgrima de Jujuy vs. Atlético Tucumán
- San Salvador de Jujuy/San Miguel de Tucumán: Gimnasia y Esgrima de Jujuy vs. San Martín de Tucumán
- Salta/San Miguel de Tucumán: Central Norte vs. San Martín de Tucumán
- Salta/San Miguel de Tucumán: Juventud Antoniana vs. San Martín de Tucumán
- San Miguel de Tucumán/Santiago del Estero: Atlético Tucumán vs. Central Córdoba
- Perico/Salta: Talleres de Perico vs. Central Norte
- Libertador/Salta: Atlético Ledesma vs. Juventud Antoniana

==== Patagonia ====
- Cipolletti/Neuquén: Cipolletti vs. Independiente de Neuquén
- Cipolletti/Comodoro Rivadavia: Cipolletti vs. Huracán de Comodoro Rivadavia
- Comodoro Rivadavia/Cutral Có: Huracán de Comodoro Rivadavia vs. Alianza de Cutral Có
- Neuquén/General Roca: Independiente de Neuquén vs. Deportivo Roca

=== Buenos Aires (city) ===
- All Boys vs. Nueva Chicago – Superderby of the Ascenso
- All Boys vs. Atlanta
- Barracas vs. Barracas Central
- Barracas Central vs. San Telmo
- Boca Juniors vs. River Plate – Superderby
- Defensores de Belgrano vs. Excursionistas – Bajo derby
- Huracán vs. San Lorenzo de Almagro – Porteño derby
- Ferro Carril Oeste vs. Vélez Sarsfield – Western derby
- General Lamadrid vs. Comunicaciones
- Nueva Chicago vs. Vélez Sarsfield
- Riestra vs. Sacachispas – Malevo derby

=== Buenos Aires Province ===
- Adolfo Gonzales Chaves: Huracán Ciclista vs. Independencia – Chavense derby
- Adrogué/Burzaco: Brown (Adrogué) vs. San Martín (Burzaco)
- Adrogué/Tristán Suárez: Brown (Adrogué) vs. Tristán Suárez – Sureño derby
- América: Independiente (América) vs. Rivadavia (América)
- Arrecifes: Almirante Brown (Arrecifes) vs. Huracán (Arrecifes)
- Avellaneda: Independiente vs. Racing – Avellaneda derby
- Azul: Alumni Azuleño vs. Azul Athletic
- Banfield/Lanús: Banfield vs. Lanús – South Zone derby
- Banfield/Lomas de Zamora: Banfield vs. Los Andes
- Bahía Blanca: Bella Vista (BB) vs. Tiro Federal (BB)
- Bahía Blanca: Villa Mitre vs. Olimpo – Bahía Blanca derby
- Boulogne/Villa Ballester: Acassuso vs. Central Ballester
- Caseros/Ciudadela: Almagro vs. Estudiantes – Tres de Febrero derby
- Chacabuco: Argentino (Chacabuco) vs. Nueve de Julio (Chacabuco) – Chacabuco derby
- Chivilcoy: Colón vs. Varela – Chivilcoy Derby
- Coronel Dorrego: Ferroviario vs. Independiente (Coronel Dorrego) – Dorreguense derby
- Daireaux: Bancario vs. Bull Dog – Deroense derby
- Ensenada/Berisso: Defensores de Cambaceres vs. Villa San Carlos – Riverside derby
- General Juan Madariaga: El León vs. Juventud Unida (Madariaga) – Madariaguense derby
- General Pinto: General Pinto vs. Pintense
- General Villegas : Atlético vs. Eclipse
- Henderson: Fútbol Club Henderson vs. Juventud Unida (Henderson) – Hendersonense derby
- Ingeniero White: Huracán (Ineniero White) vs. Puerto Comercial – Whitense derby
- Isidro Casanova/Morón: Almirante Brown vs. Morón – West Zone derby
- Jáuregui/Luján: Flandria vs. Luján
- Junín: Ambos Mundos vs. Independiente (Junín)
- Junín: Defensa Argentina vs. River Plate (Junín)
- Junín: Mariano Moreno vs. Sarmiento (Junín)
- Junín: Rivadavia (Junín) vs. Villa Belgrano – Barrio Belgrano derby
- Lanús/Remedios de Escalada: Lanús vs. Talleres (Remedios de Escalada)
- Laferrere/San Justo: Deportivo Laferrere vs. Liniers – Matancero derby
- La Plata: Estudiantes de La Plata vs. Gimnasia y Esgrima La Plata – Platense derby
- Libertad/Ituzaingó: Ferrocarril Midland vs. Ituzaingó – Western derby
- Lincoln: El Linqueño vs. Rivadavia (Lincoln) – Lincoln derby
- Mar del Plata: Aldosivi vs. Alvarado – Marplatense derby
- Mar del Plata/Estacion Camet: Alvarado vs. Cadetes de San Martín
- Mar del Plata: Aldosivi vs. Talleres (Mar del Plata) – Port derby
- Mar del Plata: General Mitre vs. Mar del Plata
- Mar del Plata: Independiente (Mar del Plata) vs. Quilmes (Mar del Plata) (Oldest city's derby)
- Mar del Plata: Kimberley vs. San Lorenzo
- Merlo/Parque San Martín: Argentino (Merlo) vs. Merlo
- Mones Cazón: Independiente (Mones Cazón) vs. Mones Cazón – Mones Cazón derby
- Monte Hermoso: Monte Hermoso vs. Suterhy – Montehermoseño derby
- Munro/Los Polvorines: Colegiales vs. San Miguel
- Olavarría: Estudiantes (Olavarría) vs. Racing (Olavarría)
- Pellegrini: Huracán (Pellegrini) vs. Pellegrini – Pellegrinense derby
- Pergamino: Argentino (Pergamino) vs. Gimnasia y Esgrima (Pergamino)
- Pergamino: Douglas Haig vs. Tráfico's Old Boys – Barrio Acevedo derby
- Pergamino: Provincial vs. Sports Pergamino – Barrio La Amalia derby
- Pigüé: Peñarol (Pigüé) vs. Sarmiento (Pigüé) – Clásico pigüense
- Pinamar: Pinamar vs. San Vicente (Pinamar) – Pinamarense derby
- Puan: Puan vs. Tiro Federal (Puan) – Puanense derby
- Punta Alta: Rosario Puerto Belgrano vs. Sporting (Punta Alta) – Puntaltense derby
- Quilmes: Argentino de Quilmes vs. Quilmes – Quilmeño derby
- San Carlos de Bolívar: Empleados de Comercio vs. Independiente (Bolívar) – Bolivarense derby
- San Martín/Victoria: Chacarita Juniors vs. Tigre
- San Miguel: Juventud Unida (San Miguel) vs. Muñiz
- San Miguel del Monte: Independiente (Monte) vs. San Miguel (Monte) – Montense derby
- Santa Teresita: Defensores Unidos (Santa Teresita) vs. Santa Teresita – Santa Teresita derby
- Sarandí/Gerli: Arsenal (Sarandí) vs. El Porvenir
- Tandil: Independiente (Tandil) vs. Ramón Santamarina
- Temperley/Lomas de Zamora: Temperley vs. Los Andes – Lomas derby
- Tornquist: Automoto vs. Unión (Tornquist) – Tornquist derby
- Tres Arroyos: El Nacional (Tres Arroyos) vs. Huracán (Tres Arroyos)
- Vicente López/Victoria: Platense vs. Tigre – North Zone derby
- Villa Gesell: Atlético Villa Gesell vs. San Lorenzo (Villa Gesell) – Geselino derby
- Zárate/Campana: Defensores Unidos vs. Villa Dálmine

=== Catamarca Province ===
- San Fernando del Valle de Catamarca: San Lorenzo de Alem vs. Villa Cubas (Catamarqueño derby)
- San Fernando del Valle de Catamarca: Chacarita vs. Parque Daza (Cuartel V derby)
- San Fernando del Valle de Catamarca: Estudiantes de La Tablada vs. Policial (La Tablada derby)

=== Chaco Province ===
- Resistencia: Chaco For Ever vs. Sarmiento (Chacoan derby)
- Resistencia: Chaco For Ever vs. Villa Alvear
- Resistencia: Sarmiento vs. Villa Alvear
- Resistencia: Estudiantes de Resistencia vs. San Fernando (East derby)
- Resistencia: Central Norte Argentino vs. Regional (Derby of the tracks)
- Resistencia: Centauro vs. Nacional José María Paz (Derby of the colleges)
- Resistencia: Universidad del Nordeste vs. Universidad Tecnológica Nacional (University derby)
- Puerto Vilelas/Barranqueras: Defensores de Vilelas vs. Don Orione (Portuary derby)
- Puerto Tirol: Independiente de Tirol vs. Juventud de Tirol (Puerto Tirol derby)
- Villa Ángela: Alvear vs. Unión Progresista (Villa Ángela derby)
- Presidencia Roque Sáenz Peña: Aprendices Chaqueños vs. Sportivo de Presidencia Roque Sáenz Peña (Saenzpeñense derby)
- Concepción del Bermejo: Banfield de Concepción del Bermejo vs. Central Norte de Concepción del Bermejo (Concepción del Bermejo derby)

=== Chubut Province ===
- Puerto Madryn: Guillermo Brown vs. Madryn (Puerto Madryn derby)
- Trelew: Independiente de Trelew vs. Racing de Trelew (Trelewense derby)
- Comodoro Rivadavia: Huracán de Comodoro Rivadavia vs. Jorge Newbery de Comodoro Rivadavia (Comodorense derby)

=== Córdoba Province ===
- Adelia María: Club Atlético Adelia María vs. Club Deportivo Municipal Adelia Maria
- Adelia María/San Basilio: Club Atlético Adelia María vs. Club Atlético San Basilio
- Alcira Gigena: Club Sportivo y Biblioteca Doctor Lautaro Roncedo vs. Club Atlético Lutgardis Riveros Gigena – Clásico gigenense
- Alejo Ledesma: Club Atlético y Biblioteca Sarmiento vs. Club Atlético Los Andes (Ledesmense derby)
- Alicia: Club Atlético y Filodramático Alicia vs. Fortín Sport Club (Aliceño derby)
- Almafuerte: Club Atlético Almafuerte vs. Club Sportivo Belgrano (Almafuertense derby)
- Arias: Arias Football Club vs. Belgrano Juniors Club Atlético y Biblioteca Popular (Ariense derby)
- Arroyito: Club Deportivo y Cultural Arroyito vs. Club Sportivo 24 de Septiembre
- Arroyo Cabral: Sport Club Colón vs. Club Atlético y Biblioteca Rivadavia (Cabralense derby)
- Bell Ville: Club Atlético Argentino vs. Club Atlético y Biblioteca Bell
- Bell Ville: Club Atletico Central vs. Club Atlético y Biblioteca River Plate
- Brinkmann: Club Centro Social Brinkmann vs. Club Atlético y Cultural San Jorge (Brinkmanense derby)
- Camilo Aldao: Asociación Mutual Defensores Boca Juniors S.C.D. vs. Juventud Unida Mutual Social y Deportiva
- Córdoba: Belgrano vs. Talleres (Cordoban derby)
- Córdoba: Instituto vs. Racing de Córdoba
- Córdoba: Las Flores vs. San Lorenzo de Córdoba
- Córdoba: Avellaneda vs. Escuela Presidente Roca
- Córdoba: Club Atlético Las Palmas vs. Universitario de Córdoba
- Córdoba: Argentino Peñarol vs. Huracán de Córdoba
- Canals: Club Atlético Canalense vs. Club Atlético Libertad
- Corral de Bustos: Club Atlético Social Corralense vs. Corral de Bustos Sporting Club
- General Cabrera: Club Sportivo Belgrano vs. Asociación Independiente Dolores
- General Levalle: Club Atletico Estudiantes vs. Deportivo Club Independencia (Levallense derby)
- Hernando: Club Atlético Estudiantes vs. Club Atlético Independiente (Hernandense derby)
- La Carlota: Club Atlético y Biblioteca Central Argentino vs. Asociación Española Jorge R. Ross
- La Palestina/Ticino: Club Atlético y Biblioteca Popular Ricardo Gutiérrez vs. Club Atlético Ticino
- Las Varillas: Club Almafuerte vs. Club Atlético Huracán (Varillense derby)
- Leones: Club Deportivo Atlético Social y Biblioteca Leones vs. Club Atlético Aeronáutico Mutual y Biblioteca Sarmiento
- Leones/Marcos Juárez: Club Atlético Biblioteca y Mutual Argentino vs. Club Atlético Aeronáutico Mutual y Biblioteca Sarmiento
- Morrison: Club Sportivo Huracán vs. Club Unión
- Morteros: Asociación Deportiva 9 de Julio vs. Club Tiro Federal y Deportivo Morteros (Morterense derby)
- Monte Buey: Club Matienzo Mutual, Social y Deportivo vs. Club Atlético San Martín
- Noetinger: Club Atlético Mutual y Biblioteca Progreso vs. Asociación Mutual San Carlos Deportivo y Biblioteca
- Río Cuarto: Club Sportivo y Biblioteca Atenas vs. Asociación Atlética Estudiantes (Riocuartense derby)
- Sampacho: Club Recreativo Confraternidad vs. Club Atlético Sampacho
- Santa Rosa de Río Primero: Asociación Mutual Club Ateneo Juvenil Acción vs. Mutual Club Atlético Santa Rosa
- Ucacha: Club Jorge Newbery M.S.D. vs Club Atlético Atenas (Ucachense derby)
- Vicuña Mackenna: Club Atlético Belgrano vs. Club Atlético San Martín
- Villa Carlos Paz: Club Atlético Carlos Paz vs. Club Atlético Independiente
- Villa María/Villa Nueva: Club Atletico Alumni vs. Foot Ball Club y Biblioteca Leandro N. Alem

=== Corrientes Province ===
- Corrientes: Corrientes vs. Libertad de Corrientes
- Esquina: Esquina vs. Esquinense (Esquinense derby)
- Curuzú Cuatiá: General Belgrano vs. Huracán de Curuzú Cuatiá
- Curuzú Cuatiá: Barracas de Curuzú Cuatiá vs. Victoria
- Paso de los Libres: Barraca vs. Guaraní de Paso de los Libres

=== Entre Ríos Province ===
- Paraná/Concepción del Uruguay: Patronato vs. Gimnasia y Esgrima de Concepción del Uruguay (Entre Ríos derby)
- Paraná: Patronato vs. Atlético Paraná (Paranaense derby)
- Paraná: Belgrano de Paraná vs. Paraná
- Paraná: Peñarol de Paraná vs. Sportivo Urquiza
- Paraná: Instituto de Paraná vs. Universitario Paraná
- Concepción del Uruguay: Atlético Uruguay vs. Gimnasia y Esgrima de Concepción del Uruguay (Uruguayense derby)
- Concepción del Uruguay: Almagro de Concepción del Uruguay vs. Parque Sur
- Gualeguaychú: Central Entrerriano vs. Juventud Unida (Gualeguaychú derby)
- Gualeguaychú: Pueblo Nuevo vs. Unión del Suburbio
- Gualeguaychú: Defensores del Oeste vs. Sarmiento de Gualeguaychú
- Gualeguaychú: La Vencedora vs. Sporting de Gualeguaychú
- Viale: Arsenal de Viale vs. Viale (Vialense derby)
- Crespo: Cultural de Crespo vs. Sarmiento de Crespo (Crespense derby)
- Seguí: Cañadita Central vs. Seguí (Seguiense derby)
- Villa Hernandarias: Hernandarias vs. Independiente de Villa Hernandarias (Villa Hernandarias derby)
- Hasenkamp: Hasenkamp vs. Juventud Sarmiento (Hasenkampense derby)
- Urdinarrain: Juventud Urdinarrain vs. Urdinarrain (Urdinarrain derby)
- Colón: Defensores de Colón vs. Sauce
- Colón: Campito vs. Ñapindá

=== Formosa Province ===
- Formosa: Chacra Ocho vs. Sol de América de Formosa (Formoseño derby)
- Formosa: Fontana vs. Sportivo Patria

=== Jujuy Province ===
- San Salvador de Jujuy/Palpalá: Gimnasia y Esgrima de Jujuy vs. Altos Hornos Zapla (Jujeño derby)
- San Salvador de Jujuy/Perico: Gimnasia y Esgrima de Jujuy vs. Talleres de Perico
- San Salvador de Jujuy/Libertador: Gimnasia y Esgrima de Jujuy vs. Atlético Ledesma
- San Salvador de Jujuy: Cuyaya vs. General Lavalle
- San Salvador de Jujuy: El Chañi vs. El Cruce
- San Pedro: San Pedro vs. Tiro y Gimnasia (Sanpedreño derby)
- Calilegua: Mitre de Calilegua vs. Unión Calilegua
- Libertador: Ingeniero Herminio Arrieta vs. San Francisco Bancario
- Monterrico: Defensores de Monterrico vs. Monterrico San Vicente (Monterrico derby)
- El Carmen: El Carmen vs. Rivadavia de El Carmen
- La Quiaca: Argentino de La Quiaca vs. Libertad de La Quiaca

=== La Rioja Province ===
- La Rioja: Américo Tesoreri vs. Andino SC (Riojan derby)
- La Rioja: Andino SC vs. Defensores de La Boca
- La Rioja: Américo Tesoreri vs. Rioja Juniors
- La Rioja: Independiente de La Rioja vs. Riojano
- Chilecito: Defensores de La Plata vs. Estrella Roja

=== La Pampa Province ===
- Santa Rosa: All Boys de Santa Rosa vs. Club Atlético Santa Rosa (Santarroceño derby)
- Victorica, La Pampa: Club Social y Deportivo Cochicó vs. Deportivo Telén (Derby of the West)
- Jacinto Aráuz: Independiente de Jacinto Aráuz vs. Villa Mengelle (Jacinto Aráuz derby)
- Guatraché: Huracán de Guatraché vs. Pampero (Guatrachense derby)

=== Mendoza Province ===
- Mendoza: Gimnasia y Esgrima vs. Independiente Rivadavia (Mendozan derby)
- Godoy Cruz: Andes Talleres vs. Godoy Cruz (Godoycruceño derby)
- Palmira/San Martín: Palmira vs. San Martín de Mendoza
- Las Heras: Algarrobal vs. Huracán Las Heras (Lasheriño derby)
- Guaymallén: Argentino de Mendoza vs. Guaymallén
- General Gutiérrez/Maipú: Gutiérrez vs. Maipú
- Fray Luis Beltrán/Rodeo del Medio: Fray Luis Beltrán vs. Rodeo del Medio
- San Rafael: Huracán de San Rafael vs. Pedal
- San Rafael: El Porvenir de San Rafael vs. Quiroga
- San Rafael: Constitución vs. San Luis de San Rafael
- La Consulta: El Fortín de La Consulta vs. La Consulta
- Colonia Las Rosas/Los Sauces: Fernández Álvarez vs. Independiente Las Rosas

=== Misiones Province ===
- Posadas: Bartolomé Mitre de Posadas vs. Guaraní Antonio Franco (Posadeño derby)
- Posadas: Jorge Gibson Brown vs. Posadas
- Oberá: Oberá vs. Olimpia de Oberá (Obereño derby)
- Puerto Iguazú: Tacuarí vs. Villa Nueva
- Puerto Iguazú: Central Iguazú vs. Galaxia
- Jardín América: El Timbó vs. Jardín América (Jardinense derby)
- Santo Pipó: Santo Pipó Sporting vs. Tigre de Santo Pipó (Piposeño derby)
- Garuhapé: Garuhapé vs. Mandiyú de Garuhapé (Garuhapé derby)

=== Neuquén Province ===
- Neuquén: Independiente de Neuquén vs. Pacífico de Neuquén
- Neuquén: Maronese vs. San Lorenzo de Neuquén
- Zapala: Barrio Don Bosco vs. Unión de Don Bosco (Zapalian derby)

=== Río Negro Province ===
- Cipolletti/General Roca: Cipolletti vs. Deportivo Roca (Rionegrino derby)
- Cipolletti: Cipolletti vs. San Martín de Cipolletti
- Cipolletti: Pillmatún vs. San Pablo de Cipolletti
- Villa Regina: Italiano de Villa Regina vs. Regina (Reginense derby)
- San Carlos de Bariloche: Estudiantes Unidos vs. Independiente de Bariloche (Barilochense derby)
- Allen: Alto Valle vs. Unión Alem Progresista (Allense derby)
- General Roca: Argentinos del Norte vs. General Roca (Roquense derby)

=== Salta Province ===
- Salta: Juventud Antoniana vs. Central Norte (Salta derby)
- Salta: Juventud Antoniana vs. Gimnasia y Tiro (Old Salta derby)
- Salta: Mitre de Salta vs. Villa San Antonio

=== San Juan Province ===
- San Juan: San Martín de San Juan vs. Desamparados (San Juan derby)
- Santa Lucía/San Juan: Juventud Alianza vs. San Martín de San Juan
- Rivadavia: Desamparados: vs. Juan Bautista Del Bono
- Rawson/Villa Krause: Trinidad vs. Unión de Villa Krause

=== San Luis Province ===
- San Luis: Estudiantes de San Luis vs. Juventud Unida Universitario (Puntano derby)

=== Santa Cruz Province ===
- Puerto Deseado: Deseado Juniors vs. Ferrocarriles del Estado (Deseadense derby)
- Puerto San Julián: Independiente de Puerto San Julián vs. Racing de Puerto San Julián (Puerto San Julián derby)

=== Santa Fe Province ===
- Rosario: Newell's Old Boys vs. Rosario Central (Rosarian derby)
- Rosario: Argentino de Rosario vs. Central Córdoba
- Santa Fe: Colón vs. Unión (Santa Fe derby)
- Rafaela: Atlético de Rafaela vs. Nueve de Julio (Rafaelian derby)
- Rafaela: Argentino Quilmes vs. Peñarol de Rafaela
- Santo Tomé: Atenas de Santo Tomé vs. Independiente de Santo Tomé (Santotomesino derby)
- Sunchales: Libertad de Sunchales vs. Unión de Sunchales (Sunchalian derby)
- San Justo: Colón de San Justo vs. Sanjustino (Sanjustino derby)
- Empalme Villa Constitución: Empalme vs. Empalme Central (Empalmense derby)
- Fighiera: Figherense vs. Central Argentino de Fighiera
- Arroyo Seco: Arroyo Seco vs. Unión de Arroyo Seco (Arroyense derby)
- Firmat: Argentino de Firmat vs. Firmat (Firmatense derby)
- Casilda: Alumni de Casilda vs. Aprendices Casildenses
- Chabás: Chabás vs. Huracán de Chabás (Chabasense derby)
- Carcarañá: Campaña vs. Carcarañá (Carcarañense derby)
- Las Parejas: Argentino de Las Parejas vs. Sportivo (Parejense derby)
- Reconquista: Adelante vs. Platense Porvenir
- Reconquista: Nueva Chicago de Reconquista vs. Racing de Reconquista
- San Vicente: Brown vs. Bochazo (Sanvicentino derby)
- Totoras: Totoras Juniors vs. Unión Fútbol Club (Totorense derby)
- María Juana: María Juana vs. Talleres de María Juana (Mariajuanense derby)
- Humboldt: Juventud Unida de Humboldt vs. Sarmiento de Humboldt (Humboldt derby)
- San Carlos Centro: Argentino de San Carlos Centro vs. Central San Carlos (Sancarlino derby)
- Felicia: Felicia vs. Juventud Unida de Felicia
- Esperanza: Juventud de Esperanza vs. Sportivo del Norte (North neighborhood derby)

=== Santiago del Estero Province ===
- Santiago del Estero: Central Córdoba vs. Mitre (Santiagueño derby)
- Santiago del Estero: Central Córdoba vs. Güemes (Western derby)
- Santiago del Estero: Comercio Central Unidos vs. Estudiantes de Santiago del Estero
- La Banda: Central Argentino de La Banda vs. Sarmiento de La Banda (Bandeño derby)
- Loreto: Loreto vs. Unión Obrera (Loretano derby)

=== Tucumán Province ===
- San Miguel de Tucumán: San Martín vs. Tucumán (Tucumanian derby)
- San Miguel de Tucumán: Amalia vs. Tucumán Central
- Aguilares: Aguilares vs. Jorge Newbery (Aguilares derby)
- Santa Ana: San Lorenzo de Santa Ana vs. Santa Ana (Santa Ana derby)
- Bella Vista/La Encantada: Bella Vista vs. San Fernando de La Encantada
- Tafí Viejo: Juventud Unida de Tafí Viejo vs. Talleres de Tafí Viejo (Taficeño derby)
