= Puerto Rico, Argentina =

City in Misiones, Argentina

Puerto Rico
- City
- Location of Puerto Rico in Argentina Puerto Rico (Argentina)
- Coordinates: 26°48′S 55°01′W
- Country: Argentina
- Province: Misiones
- Department: Libertador General San Martín

Government
  - Intendant: Carlos Koth

Population (2011)
  - Total: 17,491
- Time zone: UTC−3 (ART)
- CPA base: N3334
- Dialing code: +54 3743
- Website: www.puertorico.gov.ar

Puerto Rico is the capital city of Libertador General San Martín, in the Misiones Province of Argentina.

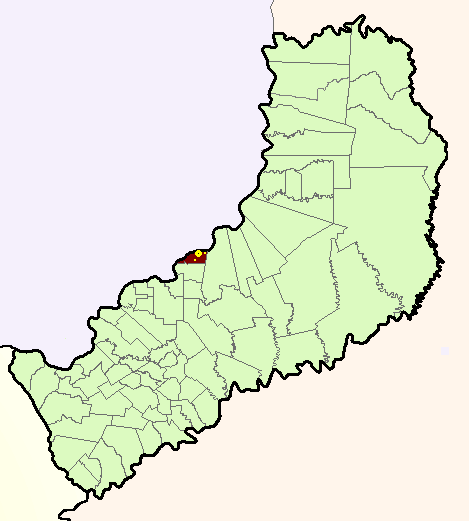
Puerto Rico within Misiones.

It is located along the Paraná River. It limits to the south with the city of Capioví, at east and north with the Garuhapé and to the east west with Paraguay.

Strategically located along Route 12, it is halfway between the Iguazu Falls and the province's capital Posadas.

With almost 12.500 hectares, the city has a population of around 20.000 people, mainly composed of European immigrants.

== Regional languages ==
Riograndenser Hunsrückisch is a German dialect with an almost two centuries history originated in the neighboring state of Rio Grande do Sul, Brazil, and spoken as a minority language in this region of Misiones since its pioneer days.
