= Ticino (disambiguation) =

Ticino, Ticinus, Ticinum can refer to:

== Switzerland ==
- Canton of Ticino
- Ticinese dialect
- Ticino, tributary of the river Po, Italy/Switzerland
- Ticino (wine region)

== Comuni of north Italy ==
- Castelletto sopra Ticino
- Bernate Ticino
- Vizzola Ticino
- Borgo Ticino
- Boffalora sopra Ticino
- Carbonara al Ticino
- Santo Stefano Ticino

== Further geographic uses ==
- Ticinum, ancient city now Pavia, Italy
- Ticino, settlement in General San Martín Department, Córdoba, Argentina

== Miscellaneous ==
- Ticino (train), an international express train that connected Milan with Zurich or Basel
- Ticino franco, former unit of currency in Switzerland
- 47164 Ticino, asteroid
- Regional Bus and Rail Company of Ticino
- Battle of Ticinus, 218 BC battle on the river Ticino, the first between Hannibal and the Romans
- Ticino League, political party in the canton of Ticino
- LaRegione Ticino, newspaper in the canton
- Corriere del Ticino, newspaper in the canton

== See also ==
- Tessin (disambiguation)
