= Tessin =

Tessin may refer to:

== People ==
- Carl Gustaf Tessin, a Swedish Count and politician
- Nicodemus Tessin the Elder, a Swedish architect
- Nicodemus Tessin the Younger, a Swedish Baroque architect, city planner, and administrator

== Places ==
=== Poland and Czech Republic ===
- Cieszyn, a border-town in southern Poland

=== Sweden ===
- Nyköpings Gymnasium Tessin, a high school in Nyköping Municipality

=== Switzerland ===
- Canton of Ticino (German: Tessin; French: Tessin; Romansh: Tessin; Italian: Ticino)
- Ticino (river), running in Switzerland and Italy

=== Germany ===
- Tessin, Germany, a town in the district of Bad Doberan in Mecklenburg-Vorpommern
- Tessin (Amt), a union of communes in the district of Bad Doberan in Mecklenburg-Vorpommern
- Tessin bei Boizenburg in the district of Ludwigslust in Mecklenburg-Vorpommern
  - a part of the commune Wittendörp in the district of Ludwigslust in Mecklenburg-Vorpommern
  - a part of the commune Kuhlen-Wendorf in the district of Parchim in Mecklenburg-Vorpommern
