= Calilegua =

Coordinates: 23°47′S 64°47′W

Calilegua (Jujuy)
- Municipality and town
- Interactive map of Calilegua (Jujuy)
- Country: Argentina
- Province: Jujuy Province
- Time zone: UTC−3 (ART)

Calilegua (Spanish pronunciation: [kaliˈleɣwa]) is a town and municipality in Jujuy Province in Argentina.

== Climate ==
Climate data for Calilegua (1935–1989)
Month	Jan	Feb	Mar	Apr	May	Jun	Jul	Aug	Sep	Oct	Nov	Dec	Year
Daily mean °C (°F)	25.3 (77.5)	24.4 (75.9)	23.0 (73.4)	20.0 (68.0)	17.3 (63.1)	14.1 (57.4)	14.0 (57.2)	15.8 (60.4)	18.5 (65.3)	22.1 (71.8)	23.8 (74.8)	25.0 (77.0)	20.3 (68.5)
Average precipitation mm (inches)	174 (6.9)	165 (6.5)	156 (6.1)	71 (2.8)	17 (0.7)	8 (0.3)	4 (0.2)	3 (0.1)	3 (0.1)	25 (1.0)	61 (2.4)	122 (4.8)	809 (31.9)
Source: Instituto Nacional de Tecnología Agropecuaria
