= Santa Ana, Tucumán =

Coordinates: 27°28′S 65°40′W

Santa Ana (Tucumán)
- Interactive map of Santa Ana (Tucumán)
- Country: Argentina
- Province: Tucumán Province
- Time zone: UTC−3 (ART)

Santa Ana is a settlement in Tucumán Province in northern Argentina.
