= Hasenkamp =

Coordinates: 31°31′S 59°51′W

- Municipality and village
- Interactive map of Hasenkamp
- Country: Argentina
- Province: Entre Ríos
- Department: Paraná
- Time zone: UTC−3 (ART)

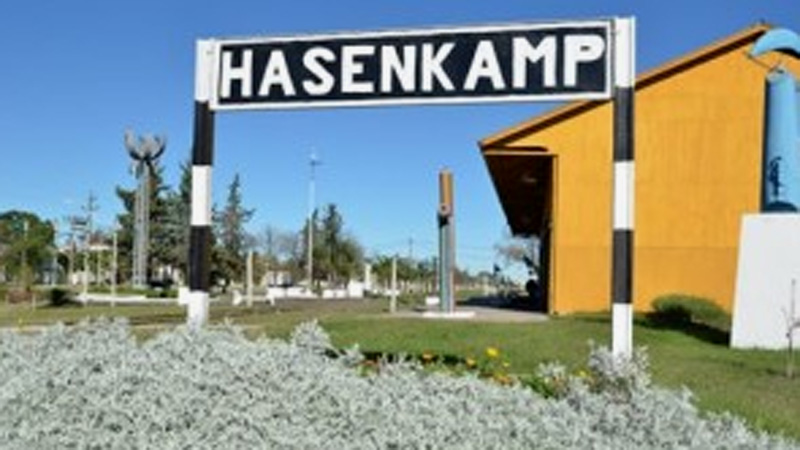
Hasenkamp

Hasenkamp is a village and municipality in Entre Ríos Province in north-eastern Argentina.
