= Garuhapé =

- Municipality and village
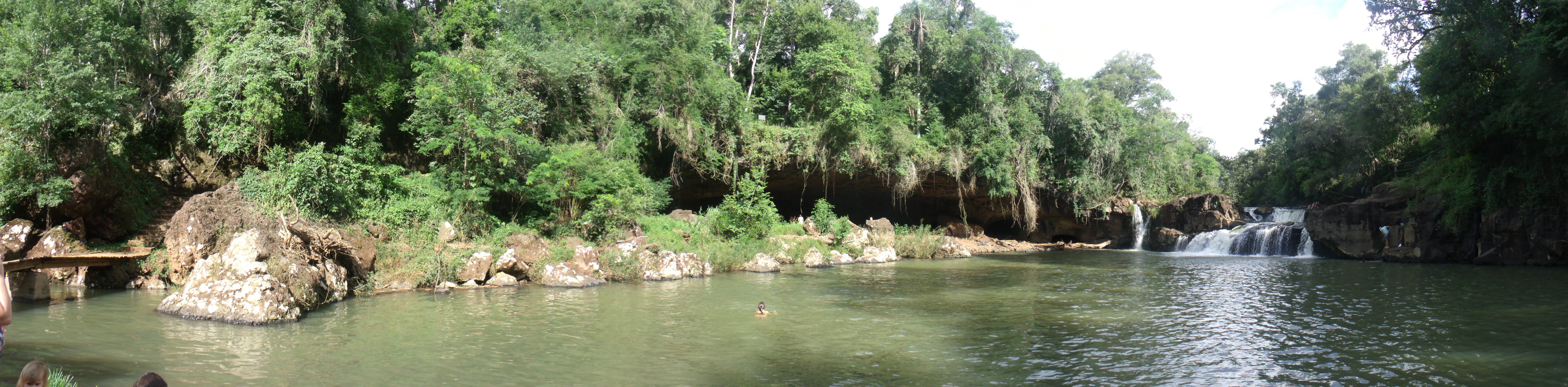

- Location within Misiones Province Location within Argentina
- Country: Argentina
- Province: Misiones Province

Government
  - Intendant: Gerardo Schmit
- Time zone: UTC−3 (ART)

Garuhapé is a village and municipality in Misiones Province in north-eastern Argentina.
